= Miss Brazil 2026 =

72nd Miss Brazil competition, national beauty pageant edition

- Date: 25 July 2026
- Presenters: Michelle Barros; Natália Guimarães; Raissa Santana; Fábio Paula
- Venue: Komplexo Tempo, São Paulo, Brazil
- Broadcaster: Record; Record Plus; R7
- Entrants: 31
- Placements: 20
- Debuts: Berço da República; Cataratas do Iguaçu; Chapada Diamantina; Ilha do Mel; Litoral Paulista; Triângulo Mineiro; Vale do Paraíba; Vale dos Vinhedos
- Withdrawals: Distrito Federal; Paraíba; Rondônia; Sergipe
- Winner: Marcella Kozinski; Ilha do Mel
- Photogenic: Flávia Klemz; Espírito Santo

Miss Brazil 2026 (Portuguese: Miss Brasil 2026), also known as Miss Universe Brazil 2026 (Portuguese: Miss Universo Brasil 2026), was the 72nd edition of the Miss Brazil beauty pageant. Taking place at Komplexo Tempo, São Paulo, Brazil on 25 July 2026, the event was the first edition to be hosted by businessman Rodrigo Ferro, based in the state of Paraná. The current Miss Brazil, Maria Gabriela Lacerda of Piauí, crowned her successor Marcella Kozinski of Ilha do Mel at the end of the ceremony, which was televised live on Record, marking the first time since Miss Brazil 2019 that the show was broadcast live on television. Marcella will represent Brazil at Miss Universe 2026, to be held in Puerto Rico.

== Results ==
=== Placements ===
Placement	Contestant
Miss Universe Brazil 2026	(Paraná (state)) Ilha do Mel – Marcella Kozinski
1st runner-up	Espírito Santo – Flávia Klemz
2nd runner-up	(Bahia) Chapada Diamantina – Jaque Ciocci
Top 6	Ceará – Leila Carvalho; Roraima – Ingrid Rezende §; (Minas Gerais) Triângulo Mineiro – Tatiana Gonçalves
Top 12	Alagoas – Blanca Quirino; Mato Grosso do Sul – Lauriane Pires; Pará – Carol Barboza; Pernambuco – Sabrina Monteiro; (Rio de Janeiro (state)) Rio de Janeiro – Bruna Zanardo; Rio Grande do Sul – Júlia Guerra; (Santa Catarina (state)) Santa Catarina – Camilla Souza
Top 20	(São Paulo (state)) Berço da República – Mariani Piaget; (Paraná (state)) Cataratas do Iguaçu – Lauren Lupato; Goiás – Diovana Camargo; (São Paulo (state)) Litoral Paulista – Carina Manzi; Rio Grande do Norte – Geovanna Miranda; Tocantins – Karina Azevêdo; (Rio Grande do Sul) Vale dos Vinhedos – Giovanna Togni

§ – Voted into the Top 6 by viewers

==== Regional queens ====
Award	Contestant
Miss Brazil Central-West	Mato Grosso do Sul – Lauriane Pires
Miss Brazil Southeast	Espírito Santo – Flávia Klemz
Miss Brazil South	(Santa Catarina (state)) Santa Catarina – Camilla Souza
Miss Brazil Northeast	Alagoas – Blanca Quirino
Miss Brazil North	Pará – Carol Barboza

==== Special awards ====
Award	Contestant
Miss Photogenic	Espírito Santo – Flávia Klemz
Best National Costume	Pará – Carol Barboza
Miss Influencer	(Bahia) Chapada Diamantina – Jaque Ciocci
Best Social Project	Rio Grande do Sul – Júlia Guerra

==== Popular Vote ====
The public vote winner automatically advanced into the Top 6:

Award	State/Region & Contestant
Miss Popular Vote Winner	Roraima – Ingrid Rezende
Top 6	Bahia – Manuela Suzart; (São Paulo (state)) Berço da República – Mariani Piaget; (Bahia) Chapada Diamantina – Jaque Ciocci; Espírito Santo – Flávia Klemz; Mato Grosso do Sul – Lauriane Pires

== Judges ==
=== Final ===
1. Adriane Galisteu – Brazilian TV host, actress, and former model;
2. Augusto Miranda – Executive in International Dental Tourism and member of the Digital Flats Group;
3. Carlos Miura – Entrepreneur;
4. Felipe Borges – Plastic surgeon and CEO of L'Avance Clinic;
5. Giba – Brazilian volleyball player and Olympic champion;
6. Isabella Menin – Miss Grand International 2022 from Brazil;
7. Jakelyne Oliveira – Miss Brazil and Miss Universe 2013 4th runner-up;
8. João Camargo – Tailor and founder of Camargo Tailoring;
9. Leonardo Reis – Linguist and founder of American English Academy;
10. Paulà Àssunção – Miss Grand Brazil 2026;
11. Silma Costa – Entrepreneur, biomedical scientist, trichologist, and founder of Raiz Ativa;
12. Vera Viel – Brazilian TV host, actress, and former model;

== Contestants ==
The confirmed contestants are as follows (31):

State or Region	Contestant	A	H	Representation	R
(Acre (state)) Acre	Andressa Jamylle Oliveira de Medeiros	38	1.69	Rio Branco	
Alagoas	Blanca de Oliveira Quirino	21	1.83	São Brás	
Amapá	Nataly de Oliveira Uchôa	31	1.75	Laranjal do Jari	
(Amazonas (Brazilian state)) Amazonas	Tárcia Ciarlini	32	1.76	Anavilhanas Islands	
Bahia	Manuela Teixeira Suzart	21	1.75	Várzea do Poço	
(São Paulo (state)) Berço da República	Mariani Besen Alberge "Piaget"	27	1.73	Guarulhos	
(Paraná (state)) Cataratas do Iguaçu	Lauren Antônia Lupato de Sousa	22	1.70	Curitiba	
Ceará	Leila Carvalho	23	1.75	Horizonte	
(Bahia) Chapada Diamantina	Jaqueline Santana Zoumbounelos Ciocci	30	1.79	Rio de Contas	
Espírito Santo	Flávia Daniela Klemz de Oliveira	21	1.72	Águia Branca	
Goiás	Diovana Borges Camargo	20	1.70	Uruaçu	
(Paraná (state)) Ilha do Mel	Marcella Kozinski de Barros	26	1.75	Curitiba	
(São Paulo (state)) Litoral Paulista	Carina Villela Manzi	29	1.70	São José dos Campos	
Maranhão	Natália da Silva da Conceição	23	1.70	Santa Luzia	
Mato Grosso	Liara Marmet da Silva	27	1.77	Água Boa	
Mato Grosso do Sul	Lauriane Pires de Souza Silva	32	1.73	Campo Grande	
Minas Gerais	Laíssa Ferreira de Sousa	24	1.68	Varjão de Minas	
Pará	Maria Carolina Barboza do Nascimento	24	1.78	Cametá	
(Paraná (state)) Paraná	Jéssica Rosa Krein	22	1.78	Marechal Cândido Rondon	
Pernambuco	Maria Sabrina de Fátima Monteiro	22	1.68	Greater Recife	
Piauí	Paloma Rodrigues de Almeida	29	1.75	Miguel Alves	
(Rio de Janeiro (state)) Rio de Janeiro	Bruna Custódio Zanardo	33	1.79	Niterói	
Rio Grande do Norte	Geovanna Nicole de Oliveira Miranda	18	1.70	Natal	
Rio Grande do Sul	Júlia Guerra Falabretti	35	1.75	Soledade	
Roraima	Ingrid Rezende Chagas	22	1.76	Boa Vista	
(Santa Catarina (state)) Santa Catarina	Camilla Fernanda de Souza	27	1.78	Joinville	
(São Paulo (state)) São Paulo	Larissa Helena Fernandes Rosa	24	1.76	Artur Nogueira	
Tocantins	Karina Silva de Azevêdo	37	1.78	Palmas	
(Minas Gerais) Triângulo Mineiro	Tatiana Gonçalves Ferreira Freitas	28	1.72	Belo Horizonte	
(São Paulo (state)) Vale do Paraíba	Patrícia Cristina Marchi	37	1.68	Campos do Jordão	
(Rio Grande do Sul) Vale dos Vinhedos	Giovanna da Silva Togni	24	1.72	Central Region of RS	

== State pageants overview ==
Color key

- The contestant was selected by casting, not by state/region pageant.
- The contestant was selected by casting, but withdraw her participation.

State Pageant	Date	Venue	Local Producer	N
(São Paulo (state)) Miss São Paulo	April 10	Komplexo Tempo, São Paulo	Renata Vilani and Samuel Teixeira	32
(Paraná (state)) Miss Paraná	May 10	Morro dos Anjos Águas Quentes Hotel Resort, Bandeirantes	Edielder Lima	26
Miss Rio Grande do Sul	May 25	Centro de Eventos da Associação Médica do RS, Porto Alegre	Paulo Linhares	15
Miss Minas Gerais	June 15	Auditório da Escola "Doutor Lund", Lagoa Santa	Sebastião Costa	22
Miss Goiás	June 16	Anfiteatro Municipal "Cantor Leandro", Aparecida de Goiânia	Périclis Nunes	19
Miss Pará	July 18	Teatro Margarida Schivasappa, Belém	Lucas Camisão and Bruno Magno	18
Miss Rio Grande do Norte	August 14	Gérbera Recepções, Parnamirim	Kenya Siqueira	13
(Acre (state)) Miss Acre	October 29	Usina de Arte "João Donato", Rio Branco	Allex Thomás	8
Miss Mato Grosso	November 15	Anfiteatro do SEST SENAT, Rondonópolis	Ronaldo Dias	12
(Santa Catarina (state)) Miss Santa Catarina	November 15	Hotel Villa Real, São Francisco do Sul	Franciele Hoeckele and Paulo Filho	15
Miss Pernambuco	November 19	Teatro Luiz Mendonça, Recife	Glauco Ferreira and Camila Albuquerque	15
Miss Espírito Santo	November 23	Espaço Patrick Ribeiro (Aeroporto de Vitória), Vitória	Charles Souza	32
(Amazonas (Brazilian state)) Miss Amazonas	November 24	Salão “Rio Solimões” do Palácio Rio Negro, Manaus	Joana Nobre	14
(Rio Grande do Sul) Miss Vale dos Vinhedos	December 10	Restaurante Di Paolo, Bento Gonçalves	Eleonara Oliveira	9
(Paraná (state)) Miss Cataratas do Iguaçu	December 12	Appointed by Instagram official account.	Alê Abdalla and Ivana Carla	1
Miss Piauí	December 15	Concessionária BYD Carmais, Teresina	Mateus Alves	1
(São Paulo (state)) Miss Berço da República	December 16	Espaço de Eventos "Santa Rita", Itu	Deise Oliveira and Stefano Kanace	9
(Rio de Janeiro (state)) Miss Rio de Janeiro	December 18	Teatro Alcione Araújo, Rio de Janeiro	Andrei Lara	8
Miss Mato Grosso do Sul	December 20	Hotel Deville Prime, Campo Grande	Lulu Oliveira and Jayson Silva	5
Miss Roraima	December 20	Restaurante Gran Maison Bistrô, Boa Vista	Paulo Silas Valente	1
(São Paulo (state)) Miss Litoral Paulista	December 21	Appointed by Instagram official account.	Carlos Câmara	1
(Minas Gerais) Miss Triângulo Mineiro	December 21	Appointed by Instagram official account.	Regiane Meire	1
Miss Amapá	December 21	Teatro Municipal Fernando Canto, Macapá	Alexandro Lima	9
(São Paulo (state)) Miss Vale do Paraíba	December 21	Deck 180 Bar e Petiscaria, Aparecida	Rafaela Sophia Lima	9
Miss Alagoas	December 22	Appointed by Instagram official account.	Márcio Mattos	1
(Santa Catarina (state)) Miss Serra Catarinense	December 22	Appointed by Instagram official account.	Lilian Chamma	1
Miss Bahia	December 22	Hotel Deville Prime, Salvador	Renata Vilani (Organização MUB)	4
(Bahia) Miss Chapada Diamantina	December 22	Hotel Deville Prime, Salvador	Renata Vilani (Organização MUB)	2
Miss Ceará	January 8	Teatro Municipal São José, Fortaleza	Ismênia Ribeiro	12
Miss Maranhão	January 8	Restaurante Feijão de Corda, São Luís	Márcio Prado	1
(Paraná (state)) Miss Ilha do Mel	January 14	Appointed by Instagram official account.	Rafa & Du Bittencourt	1
Miss Tocantins	January 16	Appointed by Instagram official account.	Raffael Rodrigues	1
(Federal District (Brazil)) Miss Distrito Federal	January 17	Appointed by Instagram official account.	Raffael Rodrigues	1
Miss Sergipe	January 23	Appointed by Instagram official account.	Neusa Gonçalves and Luciana Sola	1
Total of Contestants				320

== Other informations ==
=== Withdraw ===
- (Federal District (Brazil)) Distrito Federal
- Paraíba
- Rondônia
- Sergipe

=== Replacement ===
- (São Paulo (state)) São Paulo - Giovanna Figlie ➡️ Larissa Fernandes

=== Resignation ===
- (Federal District (Brazil)) Distrito Federal - Ana de Sá Carvalho
- (Santa Catarina (state)) Serra Catarinense - Veridiana Caroline Quadros de Freitas
- Sergipe - Bruna Ferraz Guimarães

=== Trivia ===
- It will be the first ever competition produced by the new license holder Rodrigo Ferro.
  - Businessman, he also told the Brazilian press that he hopes to inject 50 million into the contest.
  - For the first time, not only states, but other regions of the country will be able to compete with candidates.
  - The pageant will also have the help of Natália Guimarães (Vice-Miss Universe 2007) and Julia Gama (Vice-Miss Universe 2020) as directors.
    - Gama left the competition in May saying that she wants to prioritize environments and projects aligned with your personal and professional values.
- For the first time since 2019 the national beauty pageant will be televised by a free-to-air TV channel.
- Only the states of Paraíba, Rondônia and Sergipe will not join the national pageant this year.
  - This will be the first time since 1991 that both states will not compete in the national pageant.
  - This is the second consecutive year that the event has failed to finalize the list with all state representatives.
- Olivia Quido, Vice President for Global Partnerships of the Miss Universe Organization visited the brazilian headquarters during the preliminary, in March.
- Andressa Jamylle (Acre) is the oldest contestant for this year's pageant with 38 years old. She also has two kids.
- Tarcia Ciarlini (Amazonas) gained some media attention in 2019 when she became involved with Brazilian actor Henri Castelli.
  - Same for Jaqueline Ciocci (Chapada Diamantina) as a former ballet dancer of Domingão do Faustão and ex-girlfriend of chef Edu Guedes.
  - Veridiana Freitas (Serra Catarinense) was a former contestant in A Fazenda 8 and she is the ex-girlfriend of brazilian singer Gusttavo Lima.
  - Júlia Guerra (Rio Grande do Sul) was also in tabloids for being the ex-girlfriend of Anitta's brother, Renan Machado.
- Ingrid Rezende (Roraima) is the daughter of Miss Roraima 1996 and 1st runner-up at Miss Brazil 1996, Aline Rezende.
- Some of the contestants were not born in the state/region they represent this year, such as:
  - Mariani Besen Alberge "Piaget" (Berço da República) was born in Campos Novos, state of Santa Catarina.
  - Lauren Lupato (Cataratas do Iguaçu) was actually born in Erechim, state of Rio Grande do Sul, but lives in Curitiba.
  - Jaqueline Ciocci (Chapada Diamantina) was born in São Paulo City, state of São Paulo.
  - Ana de Sá (Distrito Federal) is originally from Ceres, Goiás.
  - Lauriane Pires (Mato Grosso do Sul) was born in Rondonópolis, Mato Grosso.
  - Laíssa Ferreira (Minas Gerais) was actually born in Brasília. She lives in Minas Gerais state since 2006.
  - Bruna Zanardo (Rio de Janeiro) is originally from Laranjal Paulista, São Paulo.
  - Camila Souza (Santa Catarina) was born in Montes Claros, Minas Gerais. She move to Joinville in 2023.
  - Bruna Guimarães (Sergipe) was born in São Caetano do Sul, São Paulo.
  - Veridiana Freitas (Serra Catarinense) was born in Curitiba, Paraná.
  - Karina Azevêdo (Tocantins) was born in São Paulo, São Paulo.

== Crossovers ==
=== Local ===
Miss Goiás

- 2026: (Federal District (Brazil)) Distrito Federal - Ana de Sá (Top 07)
  - (Representing Ceres in Aparecida de Goiânia, Goiás)

Miss Mato Grosso

- 2013: Mato Grosso do Sul - Lauriane Pires (2nd runner-up)
  - (Representing Cuiabá in Jaciara, Mato Grosso)
- 2016: Mato Grosso - Liara Marmet (Top 05)
  - (Representing Várzea Grande in Cuiabá, Mato Grosso)

Miss Piauí

- 2015: Piauí - Paloma Rodrigues (3rd runner-up and Miss Elegance)
  - (Representing Miguel Alves in Teresina, Piauí)

Miss São Paulo

- 2012: Sergipe - Bruna Guimarães
  - (Representing Santo André in São Paulo, São Paulo)
- 2015: Rio de Janeiro - Bruna Zanardo (Top 10)
  - (Representing Piracicaba in São Paulo, São Paulo)
- 2015: (Bahia) Chapada Diamantina - Jaqueline Ciocci (Top 15)
  - (Representing São Paulo in São Paulo, São Paulo)
- 2017: Rio de Janeiro - Bruna Zanardo (1st runner-up)
  - (Representing Laranjal Paulista in São Paulo, São Paulo)
- 2024: (São Paulo (state)) Vale do Paraíba - Patrícia Marchi (Top 10)
  - (Representing Hortolândia in São Paulo, São Paulo)
- 2026: (Bahia) Chapada Diamantina - Jaqueline Ciocci (1st runner-up)
  - (Representing Bragança Paulista in São Paulo, São Paulo)
- 2026: (Tocantins) Tocantins - Karina Azevêdo (4th runner-up)
  - (Representing Caieiras in São Paulo, São Paulo)

=== National ===
Miss Universe Brazil

- 2013: Amapá - Nataly Uchôa
  - (Representing Amapá in Belo Horizonte, Minas Gerais)
- 2021: (Paraná (state)) Ilha do Mel - Marcella Kozinski
  - (Representing Paraná in the Atlantic Ocean, during a Cruise ship)
- 2024: (Minas Gerais) Triângulo Mineiro - Tatiana Gonçalves (Top 07)
  - (Representing Minas Gerais in São Paulo, São Paulo)

Miss World Brazil

- 2011: Amapá - Nataly Uchôa
  - (Representing Maranhão in Angra dos Reis, Rio de Janeiro)

Miss Intercontinental Brazil

- 2015: Tocantins - Karina Azevêdo (Top 09)
  - (Representing São Paulo in São Paulo, São Paulo)
- 2016: Rio de Janeiro - Bruna Zanardo (Top 10)
  - (Representing Amapá in Itu, São Paulo)

Miss Supranational Brazil

- 2021: Rio de Janeiro - Bruna Zanardo (1st runner-up)
  - (Representing Sergipe in Brasília, Distrito Federal)

Miss Face of the World Brazil

- 2013: Mato Grosso do Sul - Lauriane Pires (Winner)
  - (Representing Mato Grosso in Naviraí, Mato Grosso do Sul)

=== International ===
Miss Earth

- 2016: Rio de Janeiro - Bruna Zanardo (3rd runner-up)
  - (Representing Brazil in Pasay, Philippines)

Miss International

- 2017: Rio de Janeiro - Bruna Zanardo
  - (Representing Brazil in Tokyo, Japan)

Reina Hispanoamericana

- 2021: Rio de Janeiro - Bruna Zanardo (5th runner-up)
  - (Representing Brazil in Santa Cruz, Bolivia)

Universal Woman

- 2024: (São Paulo (state)) Litoral Paulista - Carina Manzi (Top 10)
  - (Representing Brazil in Phnom Penh, Cambodia)

Miss Aura International

- 2023: (Minas Gerais) Triângulo Mineiro - Tatiana Gonçalves (4th runner-up)
  - (Representing Brazil in Antalya, Turkey)

Miss América Latina

- 2013: Rio Grande do Sul - Júlia Guerra (Winner)
  - (Representing Brazil in Quintana Roo, Mexico)

Reinado Internacional de la Ganadería

- 2012: Amapá - Nataly Uchôa
  - (Representing Brazil in Montería, Colombia)

Miss Planet International

- 2024: Sergipe - Bruna Guimarães
  - (Representing Australia in Phnom Penh, Cambodia)
