= Miss Rio Grande do Norte =

Miss Rio Grande do Norte Miss Universe Rio Grande do Norte
- Formation: 1955
- Type: Beauty pageant
- Headquarters: Rio Grande do Norte, Brazil
- Members: Miss Brazil
- Official language: Portuguese
- State Director: Kenya Siqueira

Miss Rio Grande do Norte is a Brazilian Beauty pageant which selects the representative for the State of Rio Grande do Norte at the Miss Brazil contest. The pageant was created in 1955 and has been held every year since with the exception of 1990–1991, 1993, and 2020. The pageant is held annually with representation of several municipalities. Since 2025, the State director for Miss Rio Grande do Norte is Kenya Siqueira. Rio Grande do Norte has won two crowns in the national contest.

The following women from who competed as Miss Rio Grande do Norte have won Miss Brazil:

- Flávia Cavalcanti, in 1979
- Larissa Costa Silva de Oliveira, from São Gonçalo do Amarante, in 2009

== Gallery of Titleholders ==
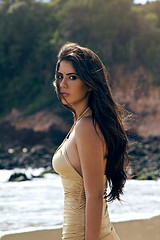
Miss Rio Grande do Norte 2014
Deise de Moura Benício

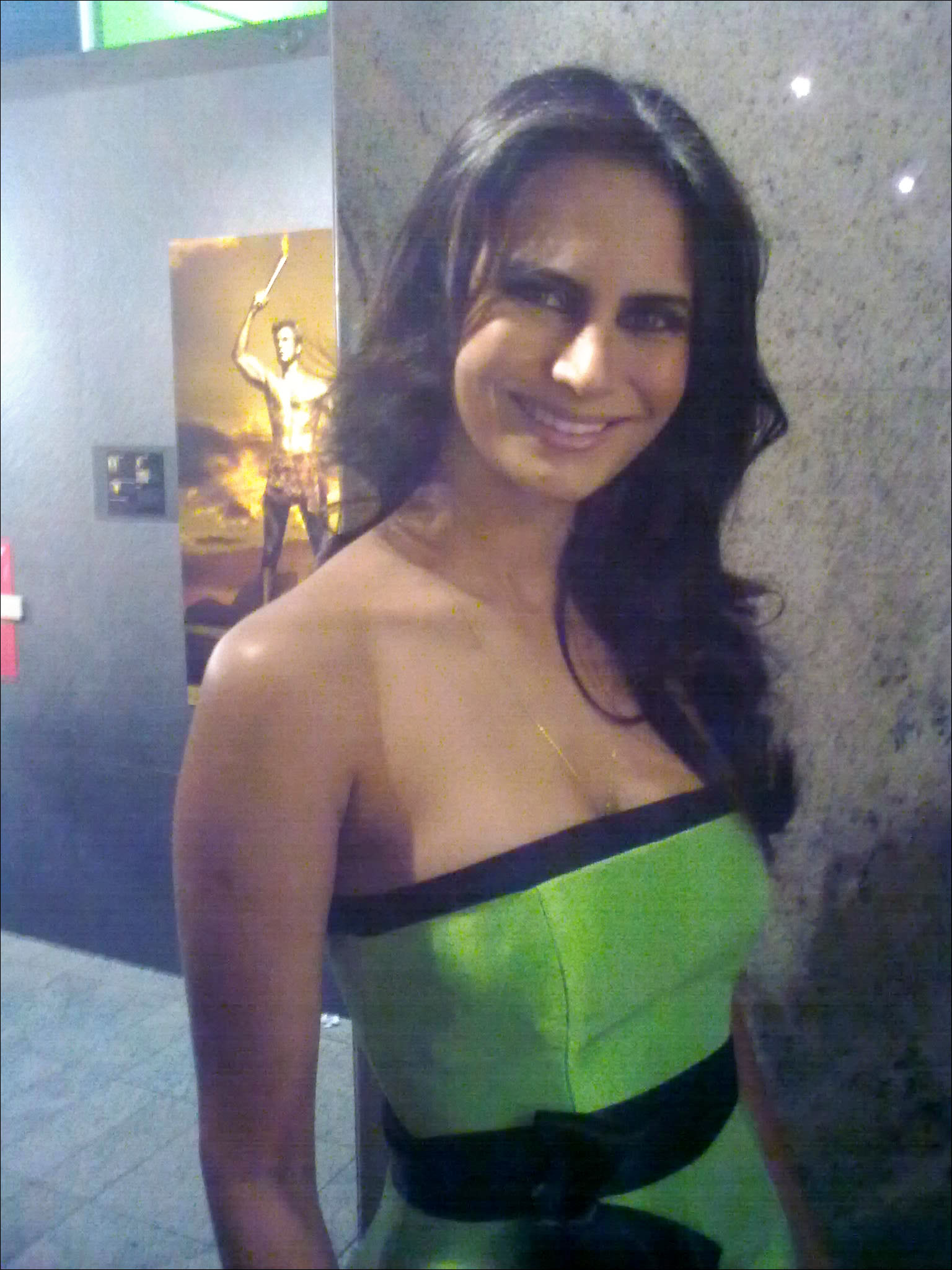
Miss Rio Grande do Norte 2009 and Miss Brazil 2009
Larissa Costa Silva de Oliveira

== Results summary ==
=== Placements ===
- Miss Brazil: Marta Jussara da Costa (1979); Larissa Costa Silva de Oliveira (2009)
- 1st Runner-Up: Valéria Cristina Böhn (1997); Kelly Alinne Fonsêca Rodrigues (2012); Danielle Marion (2016)
- 2nd Runner-Up: Deise de Moura Benício (2014)
- 3rd Runner-Up: Paula Carvalho Arruda (1998); Maria Cecília Valarini (2003)
- 4th Runner-Up: Neli Cavalcanti Padilha (1964); Olga de Barros Portela (1995)
- Top 5/Top 7/Top 8/Top 9: Carmen Aurélia Rodrigues (1961); Geórgia de Lucca Quental (1962); Manoela Alves dos Santos (2015); Érika Fontes (2019)
- Top 10/Top 11/Top 12/Top 13: Jimena Edelweiss Teixeira (1987); Rose Nascimento Paiva (1992); Jussara Medeiros (2000); Kalline Freire de Melo (2007); Andressa Simone Melo (2008); Daliane Menezes (2011); Cristina Alves da Silva Braga (2013); Milena Balza (2017); Monique Rêgo (2018); Rita Leão (2024)
- Top 15/Top 16: Giovanna Maria França (2023)

=== Special awards ===
- Miss Congeniality:
- Best State Costume:
- Miss Popular Vote:
- Miss Be Emotion:

== Titleholders ==
| Year | Name | Age (Note: Ages at the time of the pageant) | Height | Represented | Miss Brazil placement | Notes |
Miss Universe Rio Grande do Norte
| 2026 | Geovanna Nicole de Oliveira Miranda | 18 | 1.70 m (5 ft 7 in) | Natal | TBD | |
| 2025 | Regiane Meire Araújo do Nascimento | 29 | | Nova Cruz | | |
| 2024 | Rita Leão | 30 | 1.68 m (5 ft 6 in) | Tibau do Sul | Top 13 | |
| 2023 | Giovanna Maria França | 22 | 1.77 m (5 ft 9 1/2 in) | Natal | Top 16 | |
| 2022 | Maria Eduarda Morais | 24 | 1.78 m (5 ft 10 in) | Natal | | |
| 2021 | Brenda Pontes | 26 | 1.80 m (5 ft 11 in) | Tibau | | |
U Miss Rio Grande do Norte 2020 and Miss Rio Grande do Norte Be Emotion 2020
| 2020 | No national Miss Brazil contest due to the COVID-19 pandemic and change in the national franchise holder which caused the national titleholder to be appointed. | | | | | |
Miss Rio Grande do Norte Be Emotion
| 2019 | Érika Fontes | 24 | 1.78 m (5 ft 10 in) | Monte Alegre | Top 5 | Last Miss Miss Rio Grande do Norte Be Emotion |
| 2018 | Monique Rêgo | 24 | 1.78 m (5 ft 10 in) | Riacho da Cruz | Top 10 | |
| 2017 | Milena Balza | 19 | 1.81 m (5 ft 11 1/2 in) | São Gonçalo do Amarante | Top 10 | |
| 2016 | Danielle Marion | 25 | 1.78 m (5 ft 10 in) | Mossoró | 1st Runner-Up | |
| 2015 | Manoela Alves dos Santos | 20 | 1.75 m (5 ft 9 in) | Natal | Top 5 | |
Miss Rio Grande do Norte Universe
| 2014 | Deise de Moura Benício | 23 | 1.77 m (5 ft 9 1/2 in) | São Gonçalo do Amarante | 2nd Runner-Up | |
| 2013 | Cristina Alves da Silva Braga | 24 | 1.70 m (5 ft 7 in) | Parnamirim | Top 10 | |
| 2012 | Kelly Alinne Fonsêca Rodrigues | 23 | 1.80 m (5 ft 11 in) | Guamaré | 1st Runner-Up | |
Miss Rio Grande do Norte
| 2011 | Daliane Menezes | | | Parnamirim | Top 10 | |
| 2010 | Joyce Cristiny Silva | | | Serrinha dos Pintos | | |
| 2009 | Larissa Costa Silva de Oliveira | 25 | 1.75 m (5 ft 9 in) | São Gonçalo do Amarante | Miss Brazil 2009 | Competed at Miss Universe 2009. |
| 2008 | Andressa Simone Melo | | | Tibau | Top 10 | |
| 2007 | Kalline Freire de Melo | | | Mossoró | Top 10 | |
| 2006 | Jeísa Karina de Araújo | | | Timbaúba dos Batistas | | |
| 2005 | Kelyanne Freire de Medeiros | | | Angicos | | |
| 2004 | Suzana Schott da Silveira | | | Natal | | |
| 2003 | Maria Cecília de Souza Valarini | | | Appointed | 3rd Runner-Up | Maria Cecília Valarini was designated to represent the State that year, she was born in Minas Gerais and had competed twice for Miss Minas Gerais but did not win in either attempt. |
| 2002 | Muriel de Lima Mendes | | | | | |
| 2001 | Andréa de Moraes | | | | | |
| 2000 | Jussara Medeiros | | | | Top 11 | |
| 1999 | Tatiana Santos | | | Appointed | | Tatiana Santos was born in Rio de Janeiro and was invited to represent the state in 1999. She participated in the second season of the reality show Brazil's Next Top Model in 2008 at the age of 27. |
| 1998 | Paula Carvalho Arruda | | | | 3rd Runner-Up | |
| 1997 | Valéria Cristina Böhn | 17 | | Natal | 1st Runner-Up | Valéria Böhn was born in Rio de Janeiro and was invited by Marcos Ramalho to represent the State in 1997. She lived in Natal, as her mother was born in the city and still had family in the region. |
| 1996 | Elizabeth Milana Gomes | | | | | |
| 1995 | Olga de Barros Portela | | | | 4th Runner-Up | |
| 1994 | Vanessa de Souza Gurgel | | | Natal | | |
| 1993 | No delegate sent in 1993 due to Miss Brazil 1993 being appointed rather than having a contest. | | | | | |
| 1992 | Rose Nascimento Paiva | | | | Top 12 | |
| 1991 | No delegate sent in 1991. | | | | | |
| 1990 | No contest in 1990. | | | | | |
| 1989 | Acácia Rósea Souza Azevêdo | | | Clube dos Oficias da Polícia Militar | | |
| 1988 | Maria Josineide Bernardes | | | Governador Dix-Sept Rosado | | |
| 1987 | Jimena Edelweiss Teixeira | | | Assu | Top 12 | |
| 1986 | Maria Aparecida Santos | | | Carnaubais | | |
| 1985 | Antônia Albano Lopes | | | Assu | | |
| 1984 | Zenaide Salústio da Costa | | | Parelhas | | |
| 1983 | Vanda Regina Pereira | | | EMPROTUR | | |
| 1983 | Ilka Oliveira de Carvalho | | | ASSEN | Did not compete | Dethroned due to being underage. |
| 1982 | Ambrosina Dantas de Alencar | | | Caicó | | |
| 1981 | Elizabeth da Costa Peixoto | | | Ivipanim Clube | | |
| 1980 | Neiva Maria Antunes Lopes | | | Jiqui Country Club | | |
| 1979 | Marta Jussara da Costa | 20 | 1.80 m (5 ft 11 in) | Associação Cultural Potiguar | Miss Brazil 1979 | 3rd Runner-Up at Miss Universe 1979. Martha Jussara da Costa was not elected through a contest, she was crowned in the ACDP hall (Associação Cultural e Desportiva Potiguar de Mossoró) by the pageant director at the time, Luis Maria Alves, due to the cancellation of promotions and events ordered by the State governor at the time, Lavoisier Maia Sobrinho. |
| 1978 | Maria Lúcia Alves da Silva | | | Clube Social do Banco do RN | | |
| 1977 | Cenira Siqueira Marques | | | América Futebol Clube | | |
| 1976 | Eliane Maria Rocha de Azevêdo | | | Jardim do Seridó | | |
| 1975 | Newman de Lourdes Damasceno | | | Santa Cruz | | |
| 1974 | Lucimar Maria de Oliveira | | | AFURN | | |
| 1973 | Maria Goreth Gurgel Dantas | | | Tibau | | |
| 1972 | Tázia de Sá Bezerra | | | ASSEN | | |
| 1971 | Geysa Barbosa da Costa | | | ASSEN | | |
| 1970 | Maria Elna Belém da Silva | | | Areia Branca | | Born in the Macau municipality but represented Areia Branca. In 1970 the place where the contest was held, the "Palácio dos Esportes Djalma Maranhão" was reserved for the Associação Cristã Feminina and América Futebol Clube in the month where the event was normally held, the organizer of the contest, Luís Maria Alves, decided to appoint the candidate from Areia Branca, Maria Elna Belém da Silva, to represent the State. |
| 1969 | Yara Lúcia Bezerra da Cunha | | | Santa Cruz | | |
| 1968 | Maria Suely Pereira da Silva | | | Parelhas | | |
| 1967 | Maria Isabel da Nóbrega Freire | | | Aero Clube de Natal | | |
| 1966 | Maria Edite de Azevêdo | | | Jardim do Seridó | | |
| 1965 | Laurinete Bezerra de Araújo | 18 | 1.70 m (5 ft 7 in) | Mossoró | | |
| 1964 | Neli Cavalcanti Padilha | | | Caicó | 4th Runner-Up | |
| 1963 | Ísis Figueira de Melo | | | Goianinha | | |
| 1962 | Geórgia de Lucca Quental | | | Appointed | Top 8 | Due to the lack of candidates registered in the state pageant for that year, the state's organizers invited the Gaucho model, Geórgia de Lucca Quental, to represent them in that year's Miss Brazil pageant. In 1960, Georgia tried to compete in the Miss Guanabara contest, representing the Flamengo neighborhood, but was disqualified for being a professional model for "Casa Canada". |
| 1961 | Carmen Aurélia Rodrigues de Lima | | | Appointed | Top 8 | Took over after the original winner withdrew. The organizers at the time, Diários Associados, contacted the organizers of the neighboring state of Pernambuco and invited the 2nd Runner-Up of Miss Pernambuco 1961, Carmen Aurélia Rodrigues de Lima (who represented the Clube Náutico Capibaribe) to represent Rio Grande do Norte in that year's Miss Brazil, which she kindly accepted. |
| 1961 | Rony Pachêco | | | Aero Clube de Natal | Did not compete | Pachêco, was announced as the only candidate registered in the state contest for that year and was therefore elected as Miss Rio Grande do Norte 1961. However, she withdrew at the last minute prior to Miss Brazil. |
| 1960 | Zélia Maria Pinheiro | | | Aero Clube de Natal | | |
| 1959 | Terezinha Maria Bastos | | | ABC Futebol Clube | | |
| 1958 | Maria Silveirinha Soares | | | Mossoró | | |
| 1957 | Maria Socorro dos Santos Gurgel | | | Centro Esportivo Potiguar | | |
| 1956 | Amariles Gomes de Araújo | | | Associação Potiguar de Estudantes | | |
| 1955 | Maria José Varela Pachêco | | | Crônica Social da Rádio Cabugi | | |
| 1954 | No delegate sent in 1954 as the contest didn't exist until 1955. | | | | | |
