= Miss Mato Grosso =

Brazilian beauty pageant

Miss Mato Grosso Miss Universe Mato Grosso
- Formation: 1955
- Type: Beauty pageant
- Headquarters: Mato Grosso, Brazil
- Members: Miss Brazil
- Official language: Portuguese
- State Directors: Muryllo Lorensoni & Nadeska Calmon

Miss Mato Grosso is a Brazilian Beauty pageant which selects the representative for the State of Mato Grosso at the Miss Brazil contest. The pageant was created in 1955 and has been held every year since with the exception of 1990-1991, and 1993. The pageant is held annually with representation of several municipalities. Since 2023, the State directors of Miss Mato Grosso are, Muryllo Lorensoni and Nadeska Calmon.

The following women from who competed as Miss Mato Grosso have won Miss Brazil:

- Márcia Gabrielle, from Barão de Melgaço, in 1985
- Josiane Oderdengen Kruliskoski, from Sinop, in 2000
- Jakelyne de Oliveira Silva, from Rondonópolis, in 2013

== Gallery of Titleholders ==
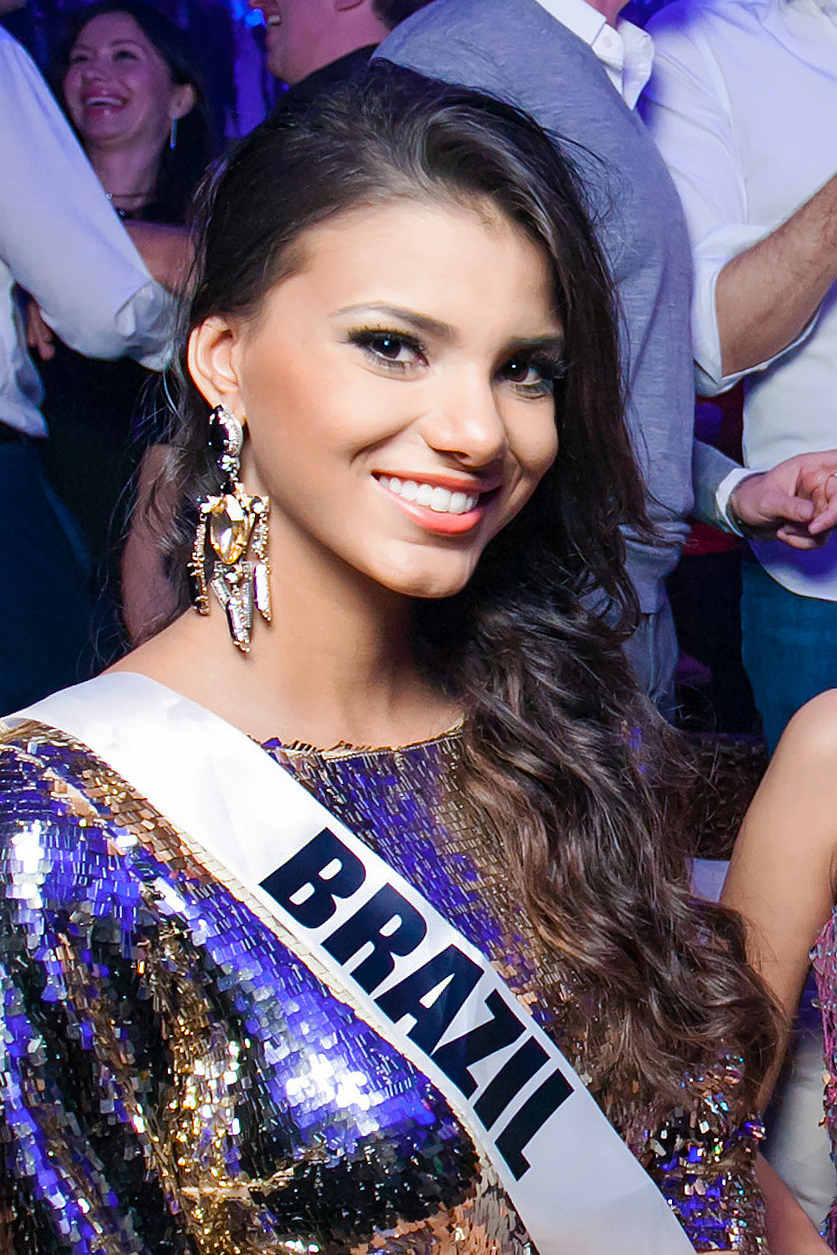
Miss Mato Grosso 2013, and Miss Brazil 2013
Jakelyne de Oliveira Silva

== Results summary ==
=== Placements ===
- Miss Brazil: Márcia Gabrielle (1985); Josiane Oderdengen Kruliskoski (2000); Jakelyne de Oliveira Silva (2013)
- 1st Runner-Up: Marlucci Manvailler Rocha (1966); Débora Moretto (1995); Camilla Della Valle (2020)
- 2nd Runner-Up: Alessandra Nardez (1992)
- 3rd Runner-Up: Marilena Lima (1965); Rosa Aparecida Azevêdo (1974); Sueli Capriata Vaccaro (1976); Karine Bonatto (1999)
- 4th Runner-Up: Shirley Damian (1980)
- Top 5/Top 7/Top 8: Vilma Borges (1970); Camilla Della Valle (2015)
- Top 10/Top 11/Top 12: Fernanda Frandsen (1981); Clarice Favretto (1984); Juliana Gross (1987); Miriam Gouvea (1988); Viviane Carrelo (1989); Raquel Ferreira (1996); Daiana Lenz (1998); Luciane Patrícia Locatelli (2001); Vanessa Regina de Jesus (2006); Juliana Florêncio Simon (2007); Juliete de Pieri (2010); Jéssica Duarte (2011); Eduarda da Rosa Zanella (2022)
- Top 15/Top 16: Taiany Zimpel (2016); Aline Fontes (2017)

=== Special Awards ===
- Miss Photogenic:
- Miss Congeniality:
- Miss Be Emotion:
- Miss Ellus Challenge:

== Titleholders ==
=== Miss Mato Grosso: 1979–present ===
The titleholders for Miss Mato Grosso since 1979.

Year	Name	Age (Note: Ages at the time of the pageant)	Height	Represented	Miss Brazil placement	Notes
Miss Universe Mato Grosso
2026	Liara Marmet da Silva	27	1.77 m (5 ft 9 1/2 in)	Água Boa	TBD	Top 5 at Miss Mato Grosso Be Emotion 2016.
2025	Naila Gabrielli Bózzio Veiga	30		Querência	Top 14	
2024	Calita Souza	23	1.74 m (5 ft 8 1/2 in)	Campinápolis		
2023	Bárbara Reis	26	1.80 m (5 ft 11 in)	Norte Mato-Grossense	1st Runner-Up	Previously Miss Mato Grosso CNB 2017 and 1st Runner-Up at Miss Brazil CNB 2017. Also Miss Supranational Brazil 2018 and Top 10 Miss Supranational 2018.
2022	Eduarda da Rosa Zanella	21	1.75 m (5 ft 9 in)	Tangará da Serra	Top 10	
2021	Gabriela Guimarães	22	1.74 m (5 ft 8 1/2 in)	Cuiabá		
U Miss Mato Grosso 2020 and Miss Mato Grosso Be Emotion 2020
2020	Camilla Della Valle	27	1.70 m (5 ft 7 in)	Cuiabá	1st Alternative/Runner-Up	No national Miss Brazil contest due to the COVID-19 pandemic and change in the national franchise holder which caused the national titleholder to be appointed. Valle was announced as the 1st Alternative/Runner-Up for Miss Brazil that year in case the winner was unable to complete her reign as Miss Brazil and compete in Miss Universe that year. Previously crowned Miss Mato Grosso Be Emotion 2015 and Top 5 at Miss Brazil 2015.
Miss Mato Grosso Be Emotion
2019	Ingrid Santin	25	1.78 m (5 ft 10 in)	Rondonópolis		Last Miss Miss Mato Grosso Be Emotion
2018	Caroline Back	18	1.84 m (6 ft 1/2 in)	Alta Floresta		
2017	Aline Fontes	20	1.75 m (5 ft 9 in)	Cáceres	Top 16	
2016	Taiany Zimpel	18	1.80 m (5 ft 11 in)	Sorriso	Top 15	
2015	Camilla Della Valle	22	1.70 m (5 ft 7 in)	Cuiabá	Top 5	Later became U Miss Mato Grosso 2020 and 1st Alternative/Runner-Up at Miss Brazil 2020.
Miss Mato Grosso Universe
2014	Jéssica Rodrigues	20	1.79 m (5 ft 10 1/2 in)	Juara		
2013	Jakelyne de Oliveira Silva	20	1.77 m (5 ft 9 1/2 in)	Distrito de Vila Operária	Miss Brazil 2013	4th Runner-Up at Miss Universe 2013.
2012	Letícia Vitorina Häuch	19	1.76 m (5 ft 9 1/2 in)	Cuiabá		
Miss Mato Grosso
2011	Jéssica Duarte			Rondonópolis	Top 10	
2010	Juliete de Pieri			Primavera do Leste	Top 10	
2009	Mônica Huppes			Nova Mutum		
2008	Flávia Piana Pereira			Primavera do Leste		
2007	Juliana Florêncio Simon			Sinop	Top 10	
2006	Vanessa Regina de Jesus			Cuiabá	Top 10	
2005	Fernanda Mara Frasson			Sorriso		
2004	Betânia Cristina Zambiazzi			Sorriso		
2003	Allynne Suber Langer			Sinop		
2002	Cláudia Renata Röhde			Feliz Natal		
2001	Luciane Patrícia Locatelli			Aripuanã	Top 10	
2000	Josiane Oderdengen Kruliskoski	19	1.78 m (5 ft 10 in)	Sinop	Miss Brazil 2000	Competed at Miss Universe 2000.
1999	Karine Bonatto			Sinop	3rd Runner-Up	
1998	Daiana Lenz			Tangará da Serra	Top 12	
1997	Cristina Berté			Cuiabá		
1996	Raquel Ferreira			Jaciara	Top 12	
1995	Débora Reis Moretto			Tangará da Serra	1st Runner-Up; Miss Brazil International 1995	Top 15 at Miss International 1995.
1994	Cláudia Almeida			Santo Antônio de Leverger		
1993	No delegate sent in 1993 due to Miss Brazil 1993 being appointed rather than having a contest.					
1992	Alessandra Nardez			Cuiabá	2nd Runner-Up	
1991	No delegate sent in 1991.					
1990	No contest in 1990.					
1989	Viviane Carrelo			Cáceres	Top 12	
1988	Miriam Gouvea				Top 12	
1987	Juliana Regina Gross			Primavera do Leste	Top 12	
1986	Aparecida Corrêa			Cuiabá		
1985	Márcia Gabrielle	21	1.78 m (5 ft 10 in)	Barão de Melgaço	Miss Brazil 1985	Top 10 at Miss Universe 1985.
1984	Clarice Favretto			Rondonópolis	Top 12	
1983	Cláudia Rodrigues			Barra do Garças		
1982	Carmen Antunes			Alta Floresta		
1981	Fernanda Frandsen			Cuiabá	Top 12	
1980	Shirley Tereza Damian			Várzea Grande	4th Runner-Up	
1979	No delegate sent in 1979.					

=== Miss Mato Grosso: 1954-1978 ===
Before 1979, Mato Grosso and the now State of Mato Grosso do Sul were one state, because of this women from the now State of Mato Grosso do Sul were able to compete in Miss Mato Grosso due to the two being in one.

Year	Name	Age (Note: Ages at the time of the pageant)	Height	Represented	Miss Brazil placement	Notes
Miss Mato Grosso (when Mato Grosso and Mato Grosso do Sul were one state)
1978	Lígia Maria Tranches			Corumbá, MS		
1977	Rosângela Venturim			Cuiabá		
1976	Sueli Capriata Vaccaro			Campo Grande, MS	3rd Runner-Up	
1975	Nádima Ferreira de Almeida			Maracaju, MS		
1974	Rosa Aparecida de Azevêdo			Campo Grande, MS	3rd Runner-Up	
1973	Maria da Graça Congro			Três Lagoas, MS		
1972	Yvone Maria Weber			Campo Grande, MS		
1971	Gleice Rocha			Aquidauana, MS		
1970	Vilma Borges			Campo Grande, MS	Top 8	
1969	Sandra Abutakka			Cuiabá		
1968	Maria Auxiliadora Campos			Corumbá, MS		
1967	Regina Helena Corrêa			Campo Grande, MS		
1966	Marlucci Manvailler Rocha			Campo Grande, MS	1st Runner-Up; Miss Brazil World 1966	3rd Runner-Up at Miss World 1966.
1965	Marilena de Oliveira Lima	18	1.72 m (5 ft 7 1/2 in)	Campo Grande, MS	3rd Runner-Up	
1964	Kátia Escudero			Cuiabá		
1963	Terezinha Elizabeth Wadouski			Campo Grande, MS		
1962	Delcy de Oliveira			Aquidauana, MS		
1961	Eliney de Figueiredo			Cuiabá		
1960	Alba Terezinha de Lima			Dourados, MS		
1959	Marly Cardoso Rosa			Cuiabá		
1958	Moacyr Metello			Cuiabá		
1957	No delegate sent in 1957.					
1956	Marlene Candido de Gásperi	18	1.63 m (5 ft 4 in)	Rondonópolis		
1955	Zuleida Assaf de Melo			Corumbá, MS		
1954	No delegate sent in 1954 as the contest didn't exist until 1955.					
