= Miss Pará =

Beauty contest

Miss Pará Miss Universe Pará
- Formation: 1955
- Type: Beauty pageant
- Headquarters: Pará, Brazil
- Members: Miss Brazil
- Official language: Portuguese
- State Director: Lucas Camisão
- Assistant State Director: Bruno Magno

Miss Pará is a Brazilian Beauty pageant which selects the representative for the State of Pará at the Miss Brazil contest. The pageant was created in 1955 and has been held every year since with the exception of 1990–1991, 1993, and 2020. The pageant is held annually with representation of several municipalities. Since 2024, the State director of Miss Pará is, Lucas Camisão, while being assisted by Bruno Magno. Pará has won only one crown in the national contest:

- Celice Pinto Marques da Silva, from Belém, in 1982.

== Results summary ==
=== Placements ===
- Miss Brazil: Celice Pinto Marques da Silva (1982)
- 1st Runner-Up:
- 2nd Runner-Up: Maria Gilda Rodrigues (1955); Sônia Maria Ohana (1967); Carlessa Macêdo da Rocha (2003)
- 3rd Runner-Up: Rayana de Carvalho Brêda (2009)
- 4th Runner-Up: Luzia Aliete Borges (1956)
- Top 5/Top 7/Top 8/Top 9: Filomena Maria Chaves (1961); Nilda Rodrigues de Medeiros (1963); Margarida Monchery (1973); Milena Gomes de Jesus (2023)
- Top 10/Top 11/Top 12/Top 13: Márcia Mirella Alarcão (1979); Sheila Maria Chady (1980); Tatiana Raquel Selbmann (1994); Renata Karolyne França (1999); Waleska Tavares e Silva (2000); Bruna dos Santos Pontes (2008); Kissia Kévia Freitas de Oliveira (2024)
- Top 14/Top 15/Top 16: Naiane Figueiredo Alves (2007); Salcy da Encarnação Lima (2010); Ana Paula Henriques Padilha (2011); Anne Carolline Vieira Rodrigues (2013); Larissa Caroline de Oliveira (2014); Beatriz Guerche Ornela Arrifano (2022); Raquel Moraes Albuquerque (2025)

=== Special awards ===
- Miss Congeniality: Sandra Waleska Normando Tavares (1970); Iranilde Costa Ribeiro (1978)
- Best State Costume:

== Titleholders ==
Year	Name	Age (Note: Ages at the time of the pageant)	Height	Represented	Miss Brazil placement	Notes
Miss Universe Pará
2026	Maria Carolina Barboza do Nascimento	24	1.78 m (5 ft 10 in)	Cametá	TBD	
2025	Raquel Moraes Albuquerque	28	1.70 m (5 ft 7 in)	Marituba	Top 14	
2024	Kissia Kévia Freitas de Oliveira	35	1.82 m (5 ft 11 1/2 in)	Belém	Top 13	
2023	Milena Gomes de Jesus	25	1.70 m (5 ft 7 in)	Salvaterra	Top 7	
2022	Beatriz Guerche Ornela Arrifano	21	1.80 m (5 ft 11 in)	Belém	Top 16	
2021	Larissa de Souza Azevêdo	21	1.72 m (5 ft 7 1/2 in)	Marabá		
U Miss Pará 2020 and Miss Pará Be Emotion 2020
2020	No national Miss Brazil contest due to the COVID-19 pandemic and change in the national franchise holder which caused the national titleholder to be appointed.					
Miss Pará Be Emotion
2019	Wilma Paulino da Silva	19	1.78 m (5 ft 10 in)	Itaituba		Last Miss Pará Be Emotion
2018	Ponnyk Melo Torres	26	1.76 m (5 ft 9 1/2 in)	Marabá		
2017	Stefany Priscila Reis Figueiredo	26	1.80 m (5 ft 11 in)	Moju		
2016	Fablina Rafaela Oliveira Paixão	18	1.78 m (5 ft 10 in)	Marabá		
2015	Carolinne Ribas de Freitas	24	1.80 m (5 ft 11 in)	Belém		
Miss Pará Universe
2014	Larissa Caroline de Oliveira	20	1.83 m (6 ft 0 in)	Colares	Top 15	
2013	Anne Carolline Vieira Rodrigues	23	1.77 m (5 ft 9 1/2 in)	Castanhal	Top 15	
2012	Layse Borges da Silva Souto	19	1.74 m (5 ft 8 1/2 in)	Salinópolis		
Miss Pará
2011	Ana Paula Henriques Padilha			Castanhal	Top 15	
2010	Salcy da Encarnação Lima	22		São Caetano de Odivelas	Top 15	
2009	Rayana de Carvalho Brêda			Barcarena	3rd Runner-Up	
2008	Bruna dos Santos Pontes			Salinópolis	Top 10	
2007	Naiane Figueiredo Alves			Marituba	Top 15	
2006	Nahdia Lopes Rocha			Belém		
2005	Fernanda Barreto e Silva			Ananindeua		
2004	Karla Braga Albuquerque			Ananindeua		
2003	Carlessa Rubicínthia Macêdo da Rocha			Cametá	2nd Runner-Up; Miss Brazil International 2003	Competed at Miss International 2003.
2002	Mary Helen Corrêa Braga			Ananindeua		
2001	Geruzah da Costa Souza			Belém		
2000	Waleska Tavares e Silva			Belém	Top 11	
1999	Renata Karolyne França				Top 10	
1998	Gleyse Daniele Menezes			Capanema		
1997	Roberta Soares Pachêco					
1996	Lúcia Maria da S. Oliveira					
1995	Graziela Aparecida Costa					
1994	Tatiana Raquel Selbmann			Belém	Top 12	
1993	No delegate sent in 1993 due to Miss Brazil 1993 being appointed rather than having a contest.					
1992	Maria Cecília Monteiro					
1991	No delegate sent in 1991.					
1990	No contest in 1990.					
1989	Giowana Almeida			Curuçá		
1988	Kátia Oliveira Velentim			Soure		
1987	Teresa Damasceno			Paysandu Sport Club		
1986	Maristela de Farias			Altamira		
1985	Rita Maria de Amorim			Clube ASBEP		
1984	Helen do Socorro Amoedo			Clube dos Lojistas		
1983	Rosana Matos de Souza			Tuna Luso Brasileira		
1982	Celice Pinto Marques da Silva	18	1.80 m (5 ft 11 in)	Clube Bancrévea	Miss Brazil 1982	Top 12 at Miss Universe 1982.
1981	Mara Aparecida Ferrabraz					
1980	Sheila Maria Chady				Top 10	
1979	Márcia Mirella Alarcão				Top 12	
1978	Iranilde Costa Ribeiro			Santarém		
1977	Joana Emília Loureiro			AC "A Grande Família"		
1976	Áurea Celeste Teixeira			Altamira		
1975	Gilcélia Alves de Lima			Capanema		
1974	Delmira Borges Teixeira			Capanema		
1973	Margarida Monchery			ACRCIS "Quem São Eles"	Top 8	
1972	Erinete Menezes Costa			Capanema		
1971	Orlandina Ferreira Mendes			Neópolis Campestre Club		
1970	Sandra Waleska Normando Tavares					
1969	Leida Ferreira Hesketh			Paysandu Sport Club		
1968	Clara Marcos Pinto			Paysandu Sport Club		
1967	Sônia Maria Ohana			Paysandu Sport Club	2nd Runner-Up	
1966	Maria Tereza Vasconcelos					
1965	Vânia Glauciene de Souza			Altamira		
1964	Maria Esther Bentes Nunes			Belém		
1963	Nilda Rodrigues de Medeiros			Automóvel Esporte Clube	Top 8	
1962	Syme Benaion Bohadana			Clube do Remo		
1961	Filomena Maria Chaves			Automóvel Esporte Clube	Top 8	
1960	Edna Azevêdo			Clube do Remo		
1959	Mary Sílvia Azevêdo			Clube da Mocidade		
1958	Margaret Cleide Huhn			Automóvel Esporte Clube		
1957	Tereza Catarina Morais			Automóvel Esporte Clube		
1956	Luzia Aliete Borges			Ass. Recreativa Bancrévea	4th Runner-Up	
1955	Maria Gilda Rodrigues			Tuna Luso Brasileira	2nd Runner-Up	
1954	No delegate sent in 1954 as the contest didn't exist until 1955.					
