= Marthina Brandt =

Brazilian actress, model and TV host

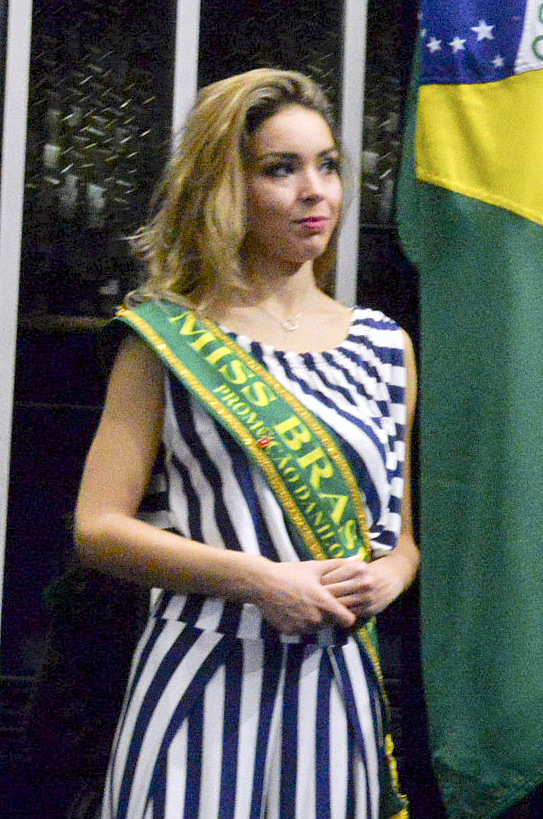
- Born: Marthina Brandt; January 31, 1992 (age 34); Vale Real, Rio Grande do Sul, Brazil
- Occupations: Actress; model; television personality; dancer
- Height: 5 ft 9 in (1.75 m)
- Beauty pageant titleholder
- Title: Miss Rio Grande do Sul 2015; Miss Brazil 2015
- Hair color: Blonde
- Eye color: Blue
- Major competitions: Miss Brazil 2015 (Winner); Miss Universe 2015 (Top 15)

Marthina Brandt (born January 31, 1992) is a Brazilian actress, tv host, dancer, model and beauty pageant titleholder who was crowned Miss Brazil 2015 representing the state of Rio Grande do Sul. With the feat, she competed in the 64th edition of Miss Universe, held on December 20, 2015 in Las Vegas, United States she was among the 15 semifinalists. The gaúcha participated in Miss Rio Grande do Sul 2012 where she lost to Miss Brazil 2012 Gabriela Markus.

She is the 13th in her state to win the title and the 5th winner in less than ten years. She is also the first blonde in ten years to be named Miss Brazil, the last being Carina Beduschi in 2005. She has worked as a model since the age of 13.

== Pageantry ==
=== Miss Brazil 2015 ===
Brandt represented her home state of Rio Grande do Sul, in the 61st edition of Miss Brazil, held on November 18, 2015, resulting as the winner, defeating 26 participants from all over Brazil.

=== Miss Universe 2015 ===
Among the responsibilities as Miss Brazil, was the representation of Brazil in Miss Universe 2015, held on December 20, 2015, at Planet Hollywood Resort and Casino in the city of Las Vegas, where she placed in the top 15 of the final night.
