= Miss Santa Catarina =

Brazilian beauty pageant

Miss Santa Catarina Miss Universe Santa Catarina
- Formation: 1955
- Type: Beauty pageant
- Headquarters: Santa Catarina, Brazil
- Members: Miss Brazil
- Official language: Portuguese
- State Director: Marcelo Sóes

Miss Santa Catarina is a Brazilian Beauty pageant which selects the representative for the State of Santa Catarina at the Miss Brazil contest. The pageant was created in 1955 and has been held every year since with the exception of 1990–1991, and 1993. The pageant is held annually with representation of several municipalities. Since 2021, the State director of Miss Santa Catarina is, Marcelo Sóes.

The following women from who competed as Miss Santa Catarina have won Miss Brazil:

- Vera Fischer, from Blumenau, in 1969
- Ingrid Budag, from Blumenau, in 1975
- Isabel Cristina Beduschi, from Gaspar, in 1988
- Taíza Thomsen Severina, from Joinville, in 2002, following the resignation of the original winner
- Carina Schlichting Beduschi, from Florianópolis, in 2005

== Gallery of Titleholders ==
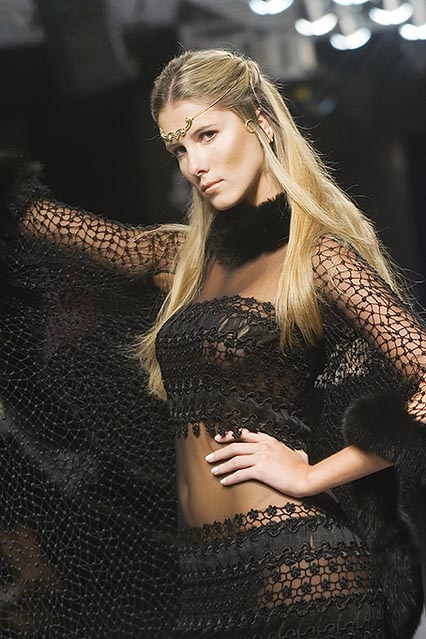
Carina Schlichting Beduschi
Miss Santa Catarina 2005, and Miss Brazil 2005

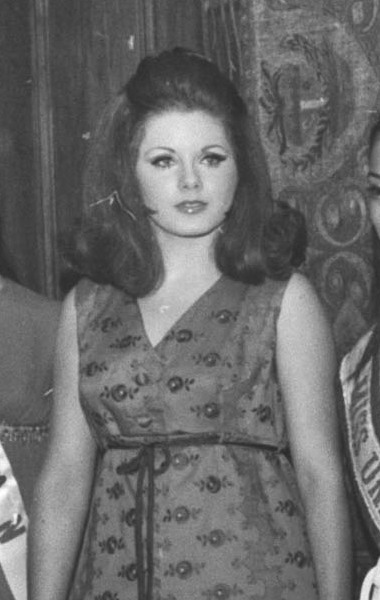
Vera Fischer
Miss Santa Catarina 1969, and Miss Brazil 1969

== Titleholders ==
Year	Name	Age (Note: Ages at the time of the pageant)	Height	Represented	Miss Brazil placement	Notes
Miss Universe Santa Catarina
2025	Emanuele Regina Pamplona	32	1.72 m (5 ft 7 1/2 in)	Gaspar		1st runner-up at Miss Santa Catarina 2017. Top 10 at Miss Santa Catarina 2015. Competed at Miss Santa Catarina 2011.
2024	Carolina Schuler	32	1.73 m (5 ft 8 in)	Itapema		Eldest contestant elected Miss Santa Catarina. 3rd runner-up at Miss Asia Pacific International 2019. Brazil at World Miss University 2017. Top 20 and Miss Congeniality at Miss Brazil World 2017.
2023	Sasha Benner Bauer	24	1.76 m (5 ft 9 1/2 in)	Blumenau	Top 16	Brazil's Queen of Oktoberfest 2020.
2022	Fernanda Maria do Carmo Souza	27	1.70 m (5 ft 7 in)	Joinville		Originally from São Paulo state. 1st runner-up at Miss World Brazil 2019. Competed in Miss Supranational 2019.
2021	Bruna Valim	27	1.68 m (5 ft 6 in)	Otacílio Costa	Top 10	Originally from Pará state. First ever black woman to represent the state.
U Miss Santa Catarina 2020 and Miss Santa Catarina Be Emotion 2020
2020
2020	Milena Sens	18	1.76 m (5 ft 9 1/2 in)	Blumenau	Did not compete	Cancelled due to the change in the national franchise holder and the COVID-19 pandemic.
Miss Santa Catarina Be Emotion
2019	Patrícia Marafon	25	1.70 m (5 ft 7 in)	Florianópolis	Top 10	
2018	Débora Silva	23	1.73 m (5 ft 8 in)	Rio Negrinho	Top 5	Married singer Mano Walter.
2017	Tamíris Gallois Ficht	24	1.69 m (5 ft 6 1/2 in)	Blumenau		Brazil's Queen of Oktoberfest 2015.
2016	Mariana Guerra	24	1.76 m (5 ft 9 1/2 in)	Araranguá		Originally from Paraná state.
2015	Sabrina Meyer	21	1.78 m (5 ft 10 in)	Palhoça	1st runner-up	
Miss Santa Catarina Universe
2014	Laura Lopes	22	1.80 m (5 ft 11 in)	Balneário Camboriú	Top 10	Originally from Rio Grande do Sul state.
2013	Francielle Kloster	18	1.80 m (5 ft 11 in)	Pomerode	Top 15	
2012	Manoella Deschamps	25	1.74 m (5 ft 8 1/2 in)	Florianópolis	Top 7	
Miss Santa Catarina
2011	Michelly Bohnen	21	1.74 m (5 ft 8 1/2 in)	Blumenau	Top 15	Also won Miss Popular Vote.
2010	Aline Zermiani			Itajaí		Married MMA fighter Minotouro.
2009	Francine Arruda	18	1.79 m (5 ft 10 1/2 in)	Ituporanga	Top 10	
2008	Gabriela Pinho			Ituporanga	Top 15	
2007	Manoella Heiderscheidt			Palhoça	Top 10	
2006	Beatriz Back			Florianópolis	2nd runner-up	
2005	Carina Schlichting Beduschi	20	1.80 m (5 ft 11 in)	Florianópolis	Miss Brazil 2005	Competed at Miss Universe 2005. Cousin of Miss Brazil 1988, Isabel Beduschi.
2004	Célia Renata da Silva			Blumenau	Top 10	
2003	Virginia Rosso			Criciúma	Top 10	
2002	Taíza Thomsen Severina	20	1.78 m (5 ft 10 in)	Joinville	1st runner-up (later Miss Brazil 2002)	Thomsen was originally the 1st runner-up, but became Miss Brazil 2002 after it was revealed that the original winner, Joseane Oliveira, was married since 1998, which was against the rules. Competed at Miss World 2002.
2001	Simone Régis			Florianópolis	Top 10	Miss Earth 2001 1st runner-up.
2000	Francine Eickemberg Cruz			Balneário Camboriú	1st runner-up	Competed at Miss World 2000. Winner of Reinado Internacional del Café 2001. Winner of Reina Sudamericana 2006.
1999	Aline Crescêncio			Palhoça	4th runner-up	
1998	Soraya Orthmann			Balneário Camboriú		
1997	Vanessa Martins			Itajaí	Top 12	Miss Teen International 1998. Competed again representing São Paulo state at Miss Brasil 2000.
1996	Débora Moser			Blumenau		
1995	Giane Tillmann			Blumenau	3rd runner-up	
1994	Fabiana Fontanella			Balneário Camboriú	1st runner-up	
1993	Fabiane Bauman			Balneário Camboriú	Did not compete.	Miss Brazil this year was a casting.
1992	Sandra Regina Merlo			Timbó	Top 05	1st runner-up last year.
1992	Evelise Lima			Blumenau	Did not compete.	Brazil's Queen of Oktoberfest 1991.
1991	Fabiana Martinelli			Joinville	Did not compete.	Supposed to compete next year, but relinquished the title.
1990	Adriane Gomes Pereira			Joinville	Did not compete.	Cancelled due to the change in the national franchise holder.
1989	Elenice Juliani			Criciúma		
1988	Isabel Cristina Beduschi	18	1.79 m (5 ft 10 1/2 in)	Gaspar	Miss Brazil 1988	Competed in Miss Universe 1988.
1987	Viviane Breisemeister			Barra Velha	Top 12	
1986	Ivana Raquel Heil			Balneário Camboriú	3rd runner-up	
1985	Andréia Ribeiro Reis			Lages	Top 12	2nd runner-up at Miss América Latina 1989. Former Banana Split group member.
1984	Cristine Bergfeld			Itajaí	Top 12	
1983	Geni Clair Bock			São Miguel do Oeste	3rd runner-up	
1982	Valquíria Macêdo			São José	Top 12	Took over after the original winner resigned.
1982	Lígia Paludo			Chapecó	Did not compete.	Relinquished the title.
1981	Elizabeth Martini			Joaçaba		
1980	Tânia Regina Gall Ternes			Balneário Camboriú		
1979	Solange Scortegagna			Lages	Top 12	
1978	Rosana Ritter			Chapecó	Top 10	
1977	Irmgard Siedschlag			Joinville	Top 8	
1976	Édina Siemsen	19	1.72 m (5 ft 7 1/2 in)	Brusque	Top 8	
1975	Ingrid Budag	18	1.73 m (5 ft 8 in)	Blumenau	Miss Brazil 1975	Top 12 at Miss Universe 1975. Lives in Austin, Texas.
1974	Arlene Kretzer			São José		
1973	Hermínia Aléssio			Criciúma	Top 8	
1972	Marlene Machado			Itajaí	Top 8	
1971	Marilena Vieira			Criciúma		
1970	Maria Suely Schlupp			Itajaí		Took over after the original winner resigned.
1970	Marileusa Mattos			Rio do Sul	Did not compete	Relinquished the title.
1969	Vera Fischer	17	1.70 m (5 ft 7 in)	Blumenau	Miss Brazil 1969	Miss Photogenic. Top 15 at Miss Universe 1969. Became a famous actress.
1968	Ivelise Brietzig			Joinville	Top 8	
1967	Uyara Gudrum Jatahy			Blumenau	Top 8	
1966	Gláucia Zimmermann			Itajaí	Top 8	
1965	Sônia Maria de Souza Pinho			Rio do Sul		
1964	Salete Chiaradia			Lages		
1963	Olga Mussi			Itajaí		
1962	Márcia Reis			Itajaí		
1961	Neusa Formighieri			Itajaí		
1960	Eliseana Haverroth			Florianópolis		
1959	Ivone Baumgarten			Blumenau		
1958	Carmen Ehrhardt			Itajaí	3rd runner-up	
1957	Terezinha Dutra Francalacci			Florianópolis		
1956	Edith Donin			Joaçaba		
1955	Ana Maria Heusi Siqueira			Itajaí		
