= Miss Brazil 2015 =

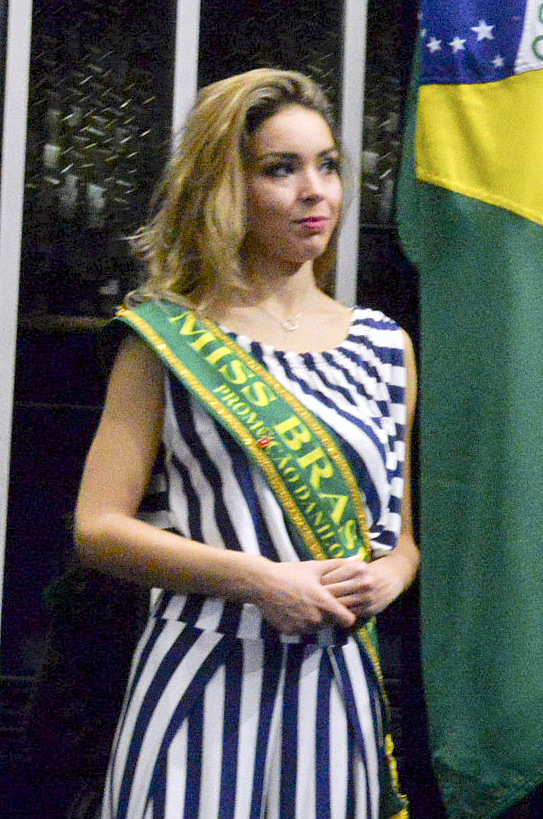
- Miss Brazil 2015, Marthina Brandt
- Date: 18 November 2015
- Presenters: Cássio Reis; Mariana Weickert
- Entertainment: Bateria da Pérola Negra; Cluster Sisters; Cross Over
- Venue: Citibank Hall, São Paulo, São Paulo, Brazil
- Broadcaster: Band; Band.com.br
- Entrants: 27
- Placements: 15
- Winner: Marthina Brandt; Rio Grande do Sul

Miss Brazil 2015 (Portuguese: Miss Brasil 2015), officially Miss Brazil Be Emotion 2015 (Portuguese: Miss Brasil Be Emotion 2015), was the 61st edition of the Miss Brazil pageant. It was held on 18 November 2015 at Citibank Hall in São Paulo, and was hosted by Cássio Reis and Mariana Weickert. Melissa Gurgel of Ceará crowned her successor Marthina Brandt of Rio Grande do Sul at the end of the event. Brandt represented Brazil at the Miss Universe 2015 pageant and placed in the Top 15.

== Results ==
Placement	Contestant
Miss Brazil 2015	Rio Grande do Sul – Marthina Brandt
1st Runner-Up	Santa Catarina – Sabrina Meyer
2nd Runner-Up	São Paulo – Jéssica Vilela
Top 5	Mato Grosso – Camila Della Valle; Rio Grande do Norte – Manoella Alves
Top 10	Bahia – Patrícia Guerra; Goiás – Thaynara Fernandes; Maranhão – Isadora Amorim; Minas Gerais – Stéfhanie Zanelli; Paraíba – Ariádine Maroja
Top 15	Distrito Federal – Amanda Balbino; Paraná – Gabriela Gallas; Pernambuco – Sayonara Veras; Piauí – Ana Letícia Alencar; Rio de Janeiro – Nathália Pinheiro

=== Special awards ===
Award	Winner
Miss Be Emotion	Distrito Federal – Amanda Balbino
Miss Popular Vote	Minas Gerais – Stéfhanie Zanelli

== Contestants ==
State	Contestant	Age	Height	Hometown	Placement	Notes
(Acre (state)) Acre	Maxine Silva	20	1.80 m (5 ft 11 in)	Rio Branco		
Alagoas	Camila Leão	21	1.74 m (5 ft 8 1/2 in)	Maceió		Previously Miss Alagoas Mundo/CNB 2014 and Top 21 at Miss Brazil World 2014.
Amapá	Daiane Uchôa	24	1.75 m (5 ft 9 in)	Calçoene		Previously Miss Amapá Mundo/CNB 2014 and unplaced at Miss Brazil World 2014.
(Amazonas (Brazilian state)) Amazonas	Carolina Toledo	21	1.75 m (5 ft 9 in)	Manaus		When Toledo was crowned as Miss Amazonas, the 1st Runner-Up of that year's state pageant, Sheislaine Hayalla, took her crown off of her and threw it onto the stage claiming that she had bought her way to winning the pageant. The incident made national as well as international news.
Bahia	Patrícia Guerra	21	1.72 m (5 ft 7 1/2 in)	Luís Eduardo Magalhães	Top 10	
Ceará	Arianne Miranda	24	1.78 m (5 ft 10 in)	Horizonte		
(Federal District (Brazil)) Distrito Federal	Amanda Balbino	21	1.85 m (6 ft 1 in)	Núcleo Bandeirante	Top 15	
Espírito Santo	Juliana Morgado	22	1.77 m (5 ft 9 1/2 in)	Vila Velha		
Goiás	Thaynara Fernandes	22	1.82 m (5 ft 11 1/2 in)	Anápolis	Top 10	
Maranhão	Isadora Amorim	24	1.74 m (5 ft 8 1/2 in)	Imperatriz	Top 10	
Mato Grosso	Camilla Della Valle	22	1.70 m (5 ft 7 in)	Cuiabá	Top 5	
Mato Grosso do Sul	Camila Greggo	22	1.77 m (5 ft 9 1/2 in)	Glória de Dourados		
Minas Gerais	Stéfhanie Zanelli	25	1.73 m (5 ft 8 in)	Ubá	Top 10	
Pará	Carolinne Ribas	24	1.80 m (5 ft 11 in)	Belém		
Paraíba	Ariádine Maroja	20	1.78 m (5 ft 10 in)	Mamanguape	Top 10	
(Paraná (state)) Paraná	Gabriela Gallas	19	1.76 m (5 ft 9 1/2 in)	Medianeira	Top 15	
Pernambuco	Sayonara Veras	22	1.73 m (5 ft 8 in)	Olinda	Top 15	
Piauí	Letícia Alencar	21	1.83 m (6 ft 0 in)	Picos	Top 15	
(Rio de Janeiro (state)) Rio de Janeiro	Nathália Pinheiro	25	1.78 m (5 ft 10 in)	Armação dos Búzios	Top 15	Previously Miss Espírito Santo Mundo/CNB 2015 and Top 10 at Miss Brazil World 2015.
Rio Grande do Norte	Manoella Alves	20	1.75 m (5 ft 9 in)	Natal	Top 5	
Rio Grande do Sul	Marthina Brandt	23	1.77 m (5 ft 9 1/2 in)	Bom Princípio	Miss Brazil 2015	
Rondônia	Gabriela Rossi	21	1.70 m (5 ft 7 in)	Porto Velho		
Roraima	Melina Gomes	23	1.68 m (5 ft 6 in)	Boa Vista		
(Santa Catarina (state)) Santa Catarina	Sabrina Meyer	21	1.78 m (5 ft 10 in)	Palhoça	1st Runner-Up	
(São Paulo (state)) São Paulo	Jéssica Vilela	22	1.81 m (5 ft 11 1/2 in)	Ribeirão Preto	2nd Runner-Up	
Sergipe	Pryscilla Felisberto	23	1.75 m (5 ft 9 in)	Umbaúba		
Tocantins	Karla Sucupira	26	1.73 m (5 ft 8 in)	Gurupi		
