= Miss Espírito Santo =

Miss Espírito Santo Miss Universe Espírito Santo
- Formation: 1955
- Type: Beauty pageant
- Headquarters: Espírito Santo, Brazil
- Members: Miss Brazil
- Official language: Portuguese
- State Director: Charles Souza

Miss Espírito Santo is a Brazilian Beauty pageant which selects the representative for the State of Espírito Santo at the Miss Brazil contest. The pageant was created in 1955 and has been held every year since with the exception of 1990, 1993, and 2020. The pageant is held annually with representation of several municipalities. Since 2022, the State director for Miss Espírito Santo is Charles Souza. Espírito Santo has won only one crown in the national contest.

The following women have represented Espírito Santo in the national contest and won:

- Maria Eugênia "Mia" Mamede, from Vitória, in 2022

== Gallery of Titleholders ==
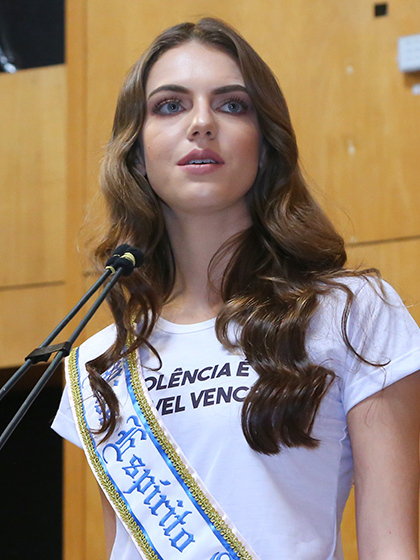
Miss Espírito Santo 2018
Sabrina Stock

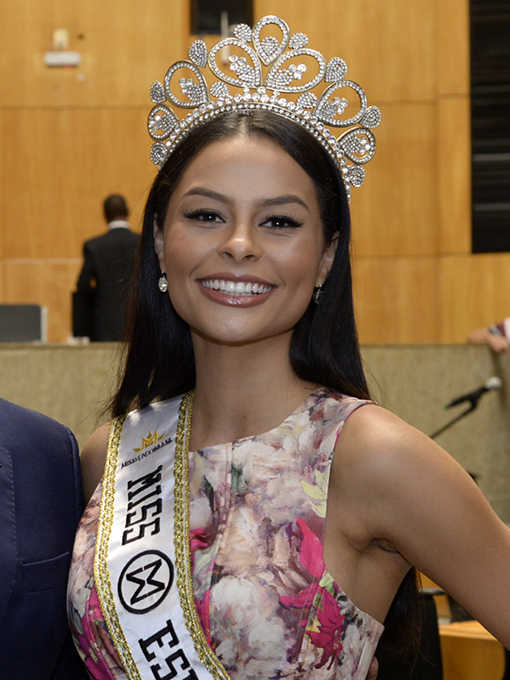
Miss Espírito Santo 2017
Stephany Pim Loren

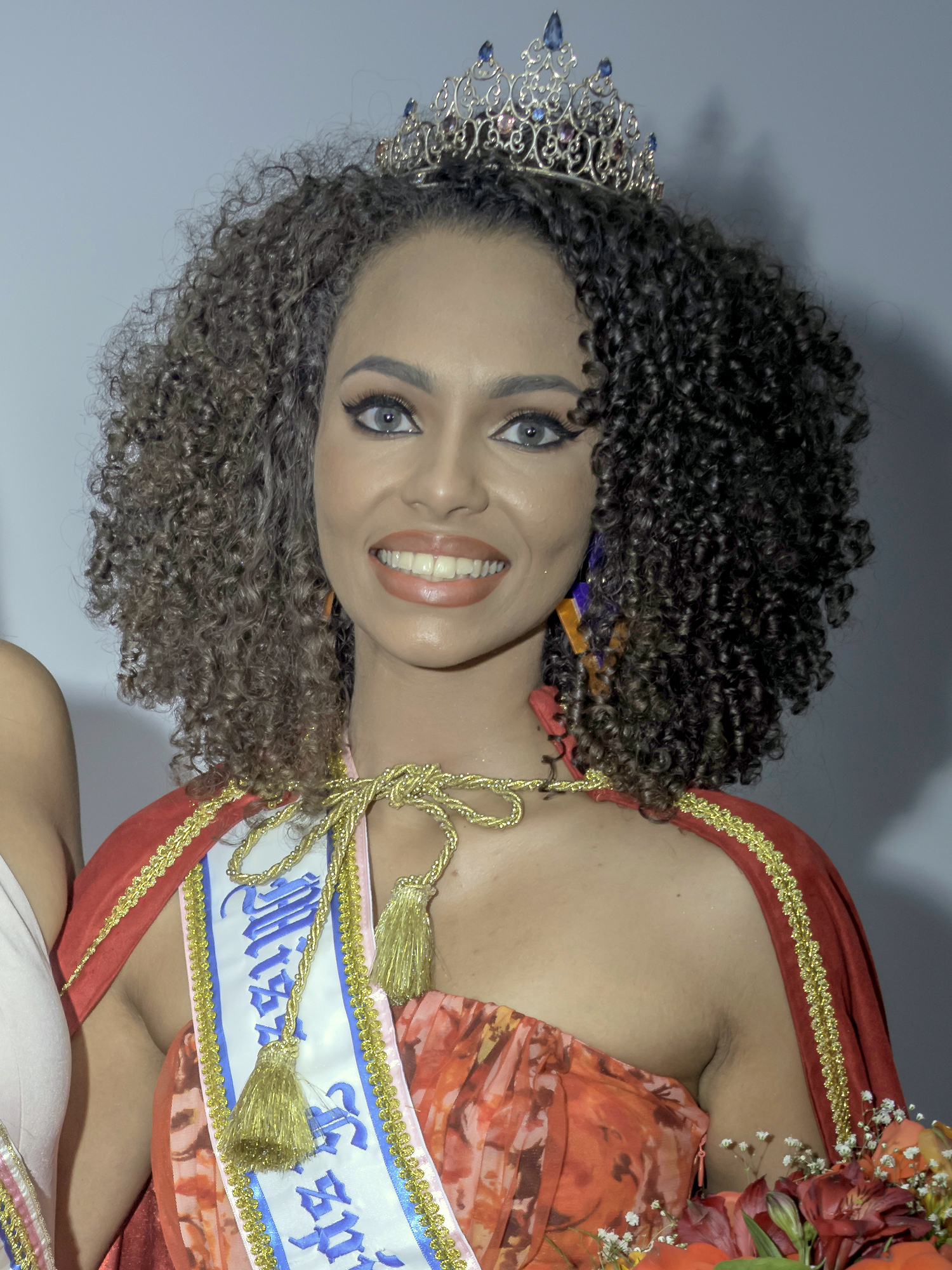
Miss Espírito Santo 2016
Beatriz Leite Nalli

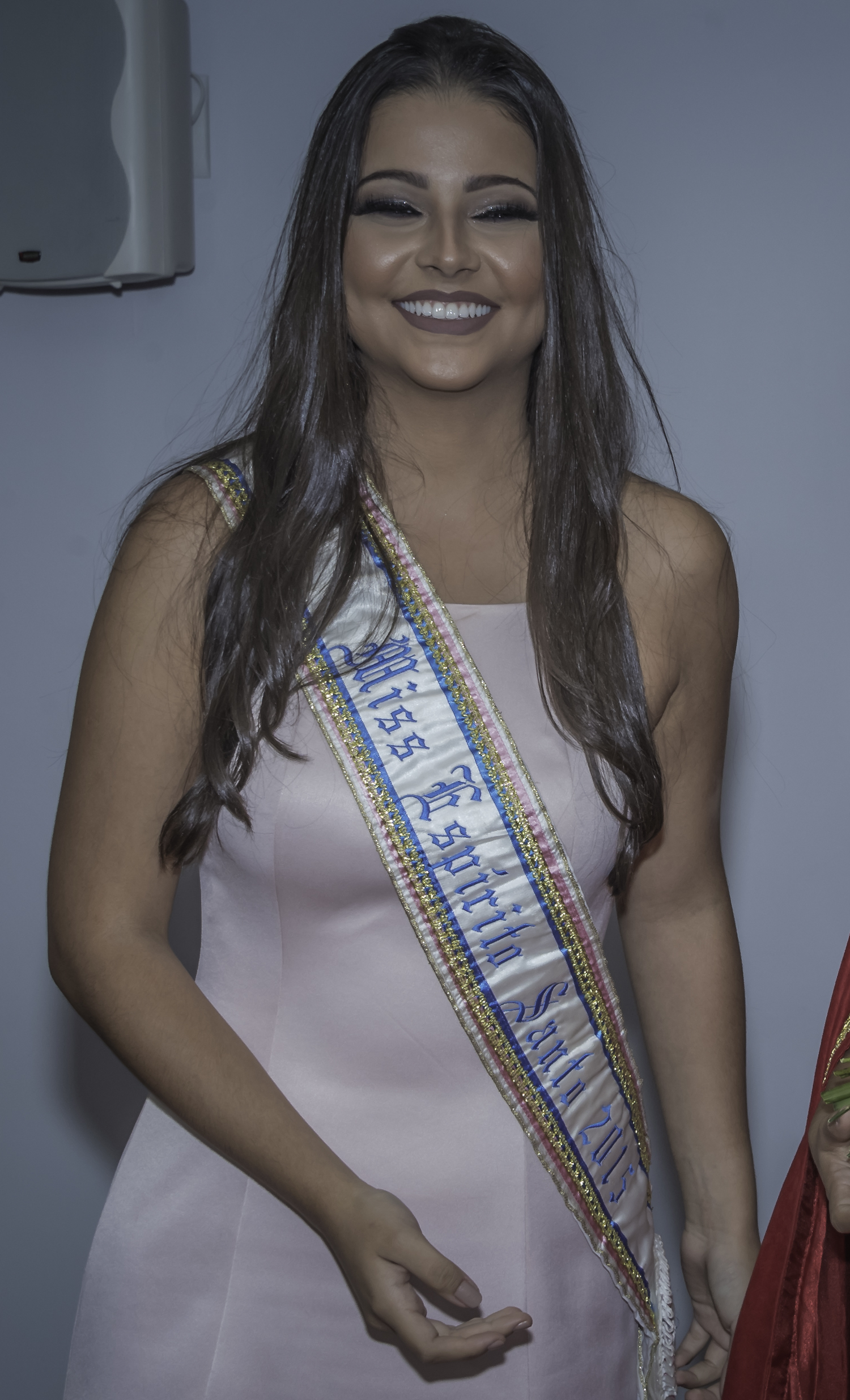
Miss Espírito Santo 2015
Juliana Morgado

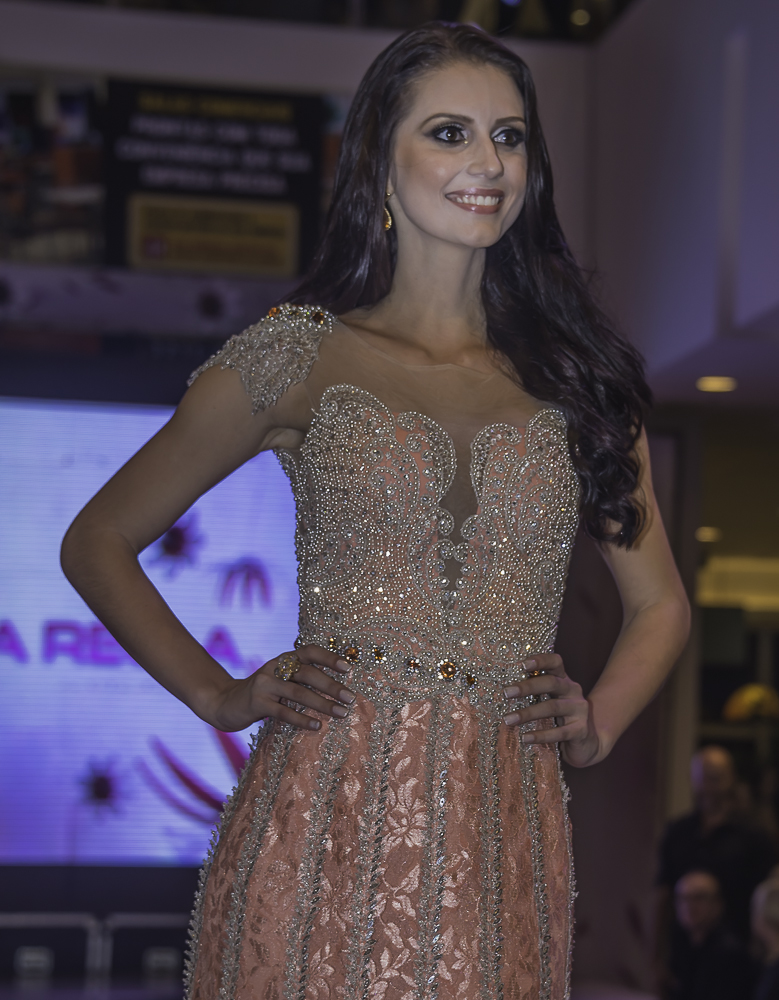
Miss Espírito Santo 2014
Amanda Palauro Recla

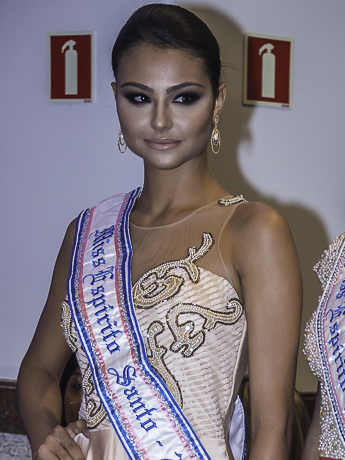
Miss Espírito Santo 2013
Anne Volponi

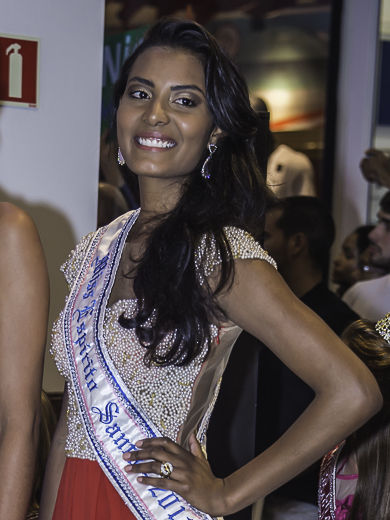
Miss Espírito Santo 2012
Fernanda Pessan

== Results summary ==
=== Placements ===
- Miss Brazil: Maria Eugênia "Mia" Mamede (2022)
- 1st Runner-Up:
- 2nd Runner-Up: Ariane Colombo (2005); Stephany Pim Loren (2017); Ana Carolina Ceolin Comério (2025)
- 3rd Runner-Up:
- 4th Runner-Up: Elizabeth Ramos Daniel (1962); Maria Gariglio Saraiva (1972)
- Top 5/Top 7/Top 8/Top 9: Solange Leão (1965); Cacilda Neitzel (1971); Letícia Lyra Galvão (2024)
- Top 10/Top 11/Top 12: Josiane Duarte Godoy (1988); Fábia Andreza Majevski (1995); Adriana Dias Duarte (1996); Francis Riguete (2008); Marcela Lopes Granato (2011); Fernanda Pessan (2012); Thainá Castro (2019); Eduarda da Silva Braum (2021)
- Top 15/Top 16: Jakeline Lemke (2007); Bianca Lopes Gava (2009); Francienne Pereira Pavesi (2010); Anne Volponi (2013); Amanda Palauro Recla (2014); Beatriz Leite Nalli (2016); Sabrina Stock (2018)

=== Special awards ===
- Miss Congeniality: Anne Volponi (2013)
- Miss Popular Vote: Jakeline Lemke (2007); Francienne Pereira Pavesi (2010); Amanda Palauro Recla (2014)
- Best State Costume: Amanda Palauro Recla (2014)

== Titleholders ==
Year	Name	Age (Note: Ages at the time of the pageant)	Height	Represented	Miss Brazil placement	Notes
Miss Universe Espírito Santo
2026	Flávia Daniela Klemz de Oliveira	21	1.72 m (5 ft 7 1/2 in)	Águia Branca	TBD	
2025	Ana Carolina Ceolin Comério	30		Linhares	2nd Runner-Up	
2024	Letícia Lyra Galvão	25	1.76 m (5 ft 9 1/2 in)	Guarapari	Top 7	
2023	Anna Beatriz Pereira de Souza	19	1.75 m (5 ft 9 in)	Vitória		
2022	Maria Eugênia "Mia" Mamede	26	1.70 m (5 ft 7 in)	Vitória	Miss Brazil 2022	Unplaced at Miss Universe 2022.
2021	Eduarda da Silva Braum	23	1.86 m (6 ft 1 in)	Afonso Cláudio	Top 10	
U Miss Espírito Santo 2020 and Miss Espírito Santo Be Emotion 2020
2020	No national Miss Brazil contest due to the COVID-19 pandemic and change in the national franchise holder which caused the national titleholder to be appointed.					
Miss Espírito Santo Be Emotion
2019	Thainá Castro	24	1.73 m (5 ft 8 in)	Vitória	Top 10	Last Miss Miss Espírito Santo Be Emotion
2018	Sabrina Stock	20	1.78 m (5 ft 10 in)	Marechal Floriano	Top 15	
2017	Stephany Pim Loren	23	1.71 m (5 ft 7 1/2 in)	Vitória	2nd Runner-Up	Previously Miss Espírito Santo CNB 2016 and 2nd Runner-Up at Miss Brazil World 2016. Real name is Stephany Souza Silva.
2016	Beatriz Leite Nalli	18	1.74 m (5 ft 8 1/2 in)	Castelo	Top 15	
2015	Juliana Morgado	22	1.77 m (5 ft 9 1/2 in)	Vila Velha		1st Runner-Up at Miss Espírito Santo 2012; Real name is Juliana Ribeiro Ferreira.
Miss Espírito Santo Universe
2014	Amanda Palauro Recla	20	1.78 m (5 ft 10 in)	Aracruz	Top 15	Also won Miss Popular Vote and Best State Costume.
2013	Anne Volponi	23	1.78 m (5 ft 10 in)	Viana	Top 15	Also won Miss Congeniality. Real name is Deisiane Volponi.
2012	Fernanda Pessan	22	1.79 m (5 ft 10 1/2 in)	Serra	Top 10	Pessan is an anagram of the surname Pereira do Espírito Santo.
Miss Espírito Santo
2011	Marcela Lopes Granato			Vitória	Top 10	Originally from Ponte Nova, Minas Gerais.
2010	Francienne Pereira Pavesi	19		Vitória	Top 15	Also won Miss Popular Vote
2009	Bianca Lopes Gava	19		Rio Bananal	Top 15	
2008	Francis Riguete	21		Mimoso do Sul	Top 10	Real name is Francielem Ramos Riguete.
2007	Jakeline Lemke			Marechal Floriano	Top 15	Also won Miss Popular Vote. Real name is Jacqueline Joyce Soares.
2006	Lívia Barraque			Conceição da Barra		
2005	Ariane Colombo			Domingos Martins	2nd Runner-Up	
2004	Angélica Corona			Linhares		
2003	Franscieli Dulianel			Linhares		
2002	Eliane Gil Gatto			Vitória		Originally from São Carlos, São Paulo State.
2001	Vanusa de Paula			Vitória		Originally from Brasília, Federal District.
2000	Sabrina Trivilim Klein			Vitória		
1999	Kátia Peterli Camargos			Venda Nova do Imigrante		
1998	Gerliana Ervati Garcia			Iconha		
1997	Wanusa Cornachini			Cariacica		
1996	Adriana Dias Duarte			Vitória	Top 10	Duarte was invited to represent the state. She was the 1st Runner-Up at Miss Minas Gerais 1996, representing Contagem. Originally from Contagem, Minas Gerais.
1995	Fábia Andreza Majevski			Cariacica	Top 10	
1994	Carla Amorim Bunjes			Vitória		
1993	No delegate sent in 1993 due to Miss Brazil 1993 being appointed rather than having a contest.					
1992	Simone Herculano					
1991	Flávia Maria Seibel			Domingos Martins		
1990	No contest in 1990.					
1989	Vanusa Pauletti					
1988	Josiane Duarte Godoy				Top 12	
1987	Anna Cristina Pereira Hülle			Domingos Martins		
1986	Eliete Ferreira Semprini			Cachoeiro de Itapemirim		
1985	Márcia Machado Gomes			Mimoso do Sul		
1984	Mariângela Serrano					
1983	Eliene Correa Barbosa			Centro Acadêmico da UFES	Did not compete	Originally the 2nd Runner-Up at Miss Espírito Santo 1983. Assumed after the original winner resigned to get married and after the 1st Runner-Up, Miss Santa Teresa, refused the crown. Represented the Centro Acadêmico de Ciências Biológicas da UFES.
1983	Carla Vieira Bigossi			Desportiva Ferroviária		Resigned the title to get married after competing in Miss Brazil.
1982	Jacqueline Ignatowska					
1981	Maria da Penha Sanches					
1980	Shirley Aparecida Sickert					
1979	Ivana Guimarães Salomão					
1978	Denise Peçanha Sarmento					
1977	Márcia Mendes Delerue					
1976	Elisa Pereira Moreira					
1975	Ângela Maria de Lima					
1974	Maria Aparecida Rizzo			João Neiva		
1973	Ivone Fátima Fontana			Santa Teresa		
1972	Maria Gariglio Saraiva			Guarapari	4th Runner-Up	Originally from Raul Soares, Minas Gerais.
1971	Cacilda Neitzel			Baixo Guandu	Top 8	
1970	Arley Sipolatti			Santa Teresa		
1969	Maria Bromenschenkel			Fluminensinho		
1968	Dalva Riva			Colatina		
1967	Gislene Tapias			Vitória		
1966	Laura Martinelli			Vitória Futebol Clube		
1965	Solange Leão			Rio Branco Atlético Clube	Top 8	Cousin of singer Nara Leão and writer Danuza Leão.
1964	Justina Primo			Colatina		
1963	Sônia Marta Anders			Monte Castelo Clube		
1962	Elizabeth Ramos Daniel			Esporte Clube Vitória	4th Runner-Up	Represented Brazil at Miss United Nations 1963.
1961	Alcione Vieira de Abreu			Alegre		
1960	Jocy Santana de Morais			Clube Saldanha da Gama		
1959	Linéa de Souza Campos			Clube Saldanha da Gama		
1958	Marly Gomes Cunha			Clube Álvares Cabral		
1957	Lygia Maria Bonfim			Clube Saldanha da Gama		
1956	Malvina Pimentel			Praia Tênis Clube		
1955	Joselina Cypriano			Cachoeiro de Itapemirim		
1954	No delegate sent in 1954 as the contest didn't exist until 1955.					
