= Miss Acre =

Brazilian beauty pageant

Miss Acre Miss Universe Acre
- Formation: 1956
- Type: Beauty pageant
- Headquarters: Acre, Brazil
- Members: Miss Brazil
- Official language: Portuguese
- State Director: Allex Tomás

Miss Acre is a Brazilian beauty pageant which selects the representative for the State of Acre at the Miss Brazil contest. The pageant was created in 1956 and has been held every year since with the exception of 1957, 1960–1962, 1990, 1993, and 2020. The pageant is held annually with representation of several municipalities. The director of the state contest has been journalist Allex Tomás since 2024. Prior to that the contest was directed by Ana Meire Lima, also known as Meyre Manaus, from 2005 to 2024. Acre still has yet to win any crowns in the national contest.

== Results summary ==
=== Placements ===
- Miss Brazil:
- 1st Runner-Up: Maria Cláudia Barreto (2006)
- 2nd Runner-Up: Danielle Knidel (2011)
- 3rd Runner-Up:
- 4th Runner-Up: Alessandra Costa Couto (1998)
- Top 5/Top 8/Top 9:
- Top 10/Top 11/Top 12/Top 13: Rosângela Terezinha Michels (1982); Leila dos Santos Gomes (1997); Kailane Amorim (2017); Laryssa Costa (2024)
- Top 15/Top 16: Iasmyne Sampaio (2014)

=== Special awards ===
- Miss Congeniality:
- Best State Costume:

== Titleholders ==
Year	Name	Age (Note: Ages at the time of the pageant)	Height	Represented	Miss Brazil placement	Notes
Miss Universe Acre
2026	Andressa Jamylle Oliveira de Medeiros	38	1.69 m (5 ft 6 1/2 in)	Rio Branco		Oldest contestant to be elected.
2025	Layane Castro Veríssimo	22	1.68 m (5 ft 6 in)	Rio Branco		
2024	Laryssa Costa Souza de Paula Afonso	30	1.68 m (5 ft 6 in)	Feijó	Top 13	First ever mom to be elected. Mother of 2.
2023	Ludimila Souza Pereira	21	1.68 m (5 ft 6 in)	Xapuri		
2022	Juliana Teixeira Rodrigues Melo	27	1.76 m (5 ft 9 1/2 in)	Cruzeiro do Sul		First ever Miss Acre to be crowned twice and two years in a row.
2021	Juliana Teixeira Rodrigues Melo	26	1.76 m (5 ft 9 1/2 in)	Cruzeiro do Sul		Crowned again the following year
U Miss Acre 2020 and Miss Acre Be Emotion 2020
2020	No national Miss Brazil contest due to the COVID-19 pandemic and change in the national franchise holder which caused the national titleholder to be appointed.					
Miss Acre Be Emotion
2019	Sayonara Moura	25	1.73 m (5 ft 8 in)	Rio Branco		
2018	Thaís Braga	22	1.78 m (5 ft 10 in)	Feijó		
2017	Kailane Amorim	23	1.72 m (5 ft 7 1/2 in)	Brasiléia	Top 10	
2016	Jucianne Menezes	20	1.74 m (5 ft 8 1/2 in)	Rio Branco		
2015	Maxine Silva	20	1.80 m (5 ft 11 in)	Rio Branco		
Miss Acre Universe
2014	Iasmyne Sampaio	19	1.74 m (5 ft 8 1/2 in)	Rio Branco	Top 15	
2013	Raissa Campêlo	25	1.78 m (5 ft 10 in)	Rio Branco		
2012	Jéssica Maia de Lima	19	1.74 m (5 ft 8 1/2 in)	Rio Branco		
Miss Acre
2011	Danielle Knidel Soares			Porto Acre	2nd Runner-Up	
2010	Andréia D'Ávilla Carvalho			Rio Branco		
2009	Elkar Portela de Almeida			Rio Branco		
2008	Achemar Souza de Castro			Rio Branco		
2007	Angélyca Sampaio			Acrelândia		
2006	Maria Cláudia Barreto de Oliveira			Rio Branco	1st Runner-Up; Miss Brazil International 2006	Competed at Miss International 2006 and won Miss Vibrant.
2005	Suzana Oltramari			Appointed		Suzana is originally from Paraná and has lived in Rio Branco since 2004.
2004	Fabíola Gomes			Appointed		Fabíola is from São Paulo State.
2003	Gislene Charaba			Appointed		Charaba is American-Brazilian from São Paulo State.
2002	Aline Oliveira Casas					
2001	Lucimara Fernandes					
2000	Érika Marcondes Marques					
1999	Gleiciane Gattas Dias					
1998	Alessandra Costa Couto				4th Runner-Up	
1997	Leila dos Santos Gomes				Top 12	
1996	Elisângela Cavalcante da Silva					
1995	Viena Oliveira Pinto Relvas			Appointed		Viena was Miss Macaé 1993 and competed in Miss Rio de Janeiro 1993.
1994	Ana Sílvia Soares Schychof					
1993	No delegate sent in 1993 due to Miss Brazil 1993 being appointed rather than having a contest.					
1992	Mariádna Gonçalves de Souza					
1991	No delegate sent in 1991.					
1990	No contest in 1990.					
1989	Selma Ramos da Cunha					
1988	Norma Cristina Costa Lameira					
1987	Carmen Lúcia Vidal Brandão					
1986	Núcia Maria da Costa Melo					
1985	Ivone Ferreira dos Santos					
1984	Maria Tereza Nunes de Melo					
1983	Mônica de Oliveira Andrade			Appointed		Mônica Andrade was selected by the then state director, Almir Silva, to represent the State in Miss Brazil.
1982	Rosângela Terezinha Michels			Appointed	Top 12	From São Borja, Rio Grande do Sul, Rosângela was invited to represent Acre. She was a candidate for Miss Brasília in 1980 (representing Minas Brasília Tênis Clube) and the Queen of Carnival in 1980 (representing Clube da Imprensa).
1981	Maria Alcineide Melo de Lima			Rio Branco Football Club		
1980	Wanize Magri da Silveira			Appointed		In 1980, the Government of Acre boycotted the state contest, claiming that it was a private promotion of the Diários Associados, with no reason to spend public money. In that edition, the State was represented by Nova Iguaçu native and candidate for Miss State of Rio de Janeiro 1980, Wanize Magri.
1979	Educyra Magalhães Assef			Rio Branco Football Club		
1978	Ângela Maria Ferreira de Lima			Associação dos Servidores do Incra		
1977	Denise Ferreira da Silva			Tarauacá		
1976	Maria Raimunda da Cunha					
1975	Lucimar de Souza Lima			Associação Acreana de Imprensa		
1974	Mariuza Carneiro Nazaro					
1973	Maria de Fátima Silvestre Maia			Rio Branco		
1972	Lucineide Oliveira Cardoso			Sena Madureira		
1971	Joana Peres de Albuquerque			Tarauacá		
1970	Maria Alice Gomes Gonçalves			Rotary Club Rio Branco		
1969	Maria Augusta Araújo Farias					
1968	Carmen Ferreira Nunes			Brasiléia		
1967	Raimunda Nogueira da Silva			Rio Branco Football Club		
1966	Maria Anunciada Cunha			Appointed		Maria Anunciada "Ada" Fernandes da Cunha, from Fortaleza, Ceará, was invited to represent the territory after achieving prominence with the titles of "Queen of the Associated Diaries" and "Queen of Students of the Liceu do Ceará".
1965	Adail Franco			Appointed		Franco is from the Méier neighborhood in Rio de Janeiro. She was invited to represent the State by the then Governor of Acre Edgar Cerqueira Filho.
1964	Laura Ribeiro Aranha			Appointed		Laura Ribeiro Aranha was nominated to represent Acre by Bahian costume designer Evandro de Castro Lima. She is from Rio.
1963	Maria Cristina Laport			Appointed		
1962	No delegate sent between 1960 and 1962.					
1961	No delegate sent between 1960 and 1962.					
1960	No delegate sent between 1960 and 1962.					
1959	Eneida Dulce de Castro Lopes			Rio Branco Football Club		
1958	Nascília Nogueira			Rio Branco		Nascília was the first representative elected by contest and also the first from the capital, since she was elected "Miss Rio Branco" on August 31, 1957, and later the most beautiful in the state in the halls of Rio Branco Futebol Clube on September 5, 1957 . She competed in the state pageant with only one other candidate from Cruzeiro do Sul.
1957	No delegate sent in 1957.					
1956	Wilma Campos de Araújo			Território do Acre		Wilma was invited to represent the then territory by the then Governor of Acre Valério Caldas de Magalhães. At the time, she was studying Philosophy in Rio de Janeiro. Her father was a doctor from Rio de Janeiro and her mother came from a traditional Acre family. Wilma was sashed as "Miss Territorio do Acre" at the "Casa do Acreano" in Rio de Janeiro.
1955	No delegate sent in 1954 & 1955 as the contest didn't exist until 1956.					
1954	No delegate sent in 1954 & 1955 as the contest didn't exist until 1956.					
