= Miss Brazil 2014 =

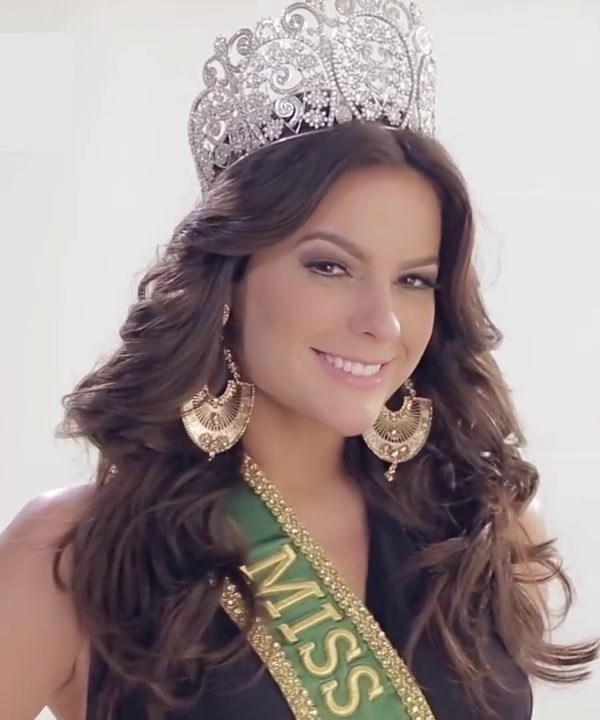
- Miss Brazil 2014, Melissa Gurgel
- Date: September 27, 2014
- Presenters: André Vasco, Renata Fan, and Patrícia Maldonado
- Entertainment: Emin Agalarov
- Venue: Centro de Eventos do Ceará, Fortaleza, CE
- Broadcaster: Rede Bandeirantes
- Entrants: 27
- Placements: 15
- Winner: Melissa Gurgel; Ceará
- Congeniality: Sinaira Machado Souza; Rondônia

The Miss Brazil 2014 was the 60th edition of the Miss Brazil pageant, held in Centro de Eventos do Ceará, Fortaleza, Ceará, Jakelyne Oliveira of Mato Grosso, crowned her successor Melissa Gurgel of Ceará. Delegates from each state and the Federal District for competed for the national crown. The winner represented Brazil in Miss Universe 2014 and placed Top 15.

== Results ==
=== Placements ===
Placement	State and Contestant
Miss Brazil 2014	Ceará - Melissa Gurgel
1st Runner-Up	São Paulo - Fernanda Leme
2nd Runner-Up	Rio Grande do Norte - Deise Benício
Finalists	Amapá - Priscila Winny; Goiás - Beatrice Fontoura
(TOP 10); Semifinalists	Amazonas - Ytala Narjjara; Distrito Federal - Luísa Lopes; Maranhão - Larissa Pires; Rio Grande do Sul - Marina Helms; Santa Catarina - Laura Lopes
(TOP 15); Semifinalists	Acre - Iasmyne Sampaio; Espírito Santo - Amanda Recla; Pará - Larissa Oliveira; Paraná - Nathaly Gookalte; Rio de Janeiro - Hosana Elliot

=== Special awards ===
- The winner of the prize Miss Internet would go to semis.

Award	State and Contestant
Miss Congeniality	Rondônia - Sinaira Machado Souza
Best National Costume	Espírito Santo - Amanda Recla
Miss Internet	Espírito Santo - Amanda Recla

=== Order of Announcements ===
==== Top 15 ====
1. Pará
2. Paraná
3. Amazonas
4. Rio Grande do Norte
5. Distrito Federal
6. Santa Catarina
7. Goiás
8. Maranhão
9. São Paulo
10. Acre
11. Amapá
12. Rio de Janeiro
13. Rio Grande do Sul
14. Ceará
15. Espírito Santo

==== Top 10 ====
1. Ceará
2. Distrito Federal
3. Rio Grande do Norte
4. Rio Grande do Sul
5. Santa Catarina
6. São Paulo
7. Amapá
8. Amazonas
9. Goiás
10. Maranhão

==== Top 5 ====
1. Ceará
2. São Paulo
3. Rio Grande do Norte
4. Amapá
5. Goiás

==== Top 3 ====
1. São Paulo
2. Rio Grande do Norte
3. Ceará

== Contestants ==
State	Contestant	Age	Height	Hometown	Ref
(Acre (state)) Acre	Iasmyne Sampaio	19	1.70	Rio Branco	
Alagoas	Aline Karla Macêdo	20	1.76	Arapiraca	
Amapá	Priscila Winny	22	1.82	Cutias do Araguari	
(Amazonas (Brazilian state)) Amazonas	Ytala Narjjara	20	1.80	Manaus	
Bahia	Anne Lima	20	1.81	Caetité	
Ceará	Melissa Gurgel	20	1.68	Fortaleza	
(Federal District (Brazil)) Distrito Federal	Luísa Lopes	24	1.78	Brasília	
Espírito Santo	Amanda Recla	20	1.78	Aracruz	
Goiás	Beatrice Fontoura	24	1.79	Goiânia	
Maranhão	Larissa Pires	21	1.80	Balsas	
Mato Grosso	Jéssica Rodrigues	20	1.80	Juara	
Mato Grosso do Sul	Érika Moura	19	1.80	Três Lagoas	
Minas Gerais	Karen Porfiro	23	1.74	Timóteo	
Pará	Larissa Oliveira	19	1.84	Colares	
Paraíba	Larissa Muniz	19	1.75	Esperança	
(Paraná (state)) Paraná	Nathaly Goolkate	24	1.81	Carambeí	
Pernambuco	Rhayanne Nery	19	1.78	Recife	
Piauí	Verbiany Leal	23	1.79	Batalha	
(Rio de Janeiro (state)) Rio de Janeiro	Hosana Elliot	21	1.82	Rio de Janeiro	
Rio Grande do Norte	Deise Benício	23	1.78	São Gonçalo do Amarante	
Rio Grande do Sul	Marina Helms	23	1.78	São Lourenço do Sul	
Rondônia	Sinaira Machado Souza	24	1.74	Porto Velho	
Roraima	Marina Pasqualotto	23	1.80	Boa Vista	
(Santa Catarina (state)) Santa Catarina	Laura Lopes	22	1.79	Balneário Camboriú	
(São Paulo (state)) São Paulo	Fernanda Leme	22	1.82	Ribeirão Preto	
Sergipe	Priscilla Pinheiro	21	1.80	Campo do brito	
Tocantins	Wizelany Marques	20	1.73	Palmas	
