= Ituporanga =

Coordinates: 27°25′S 49°36′W

- Municipality
- Flag Coat of arms
- Interactive map of Ituporanga
- Country: Brazil
- Region: South
- State: Santa Catarina
- Mesoregion: Vale do Itajai

Population (2020)
  - Total: 25,355
- Time zone: UTC -3
- Website: www.ituporanga.sc.gov.br

Ituporanga is a municipality in the state of Santa Catarina in the South region of Brazil.

== Climate ==
Climate data for Ituporanga, elevation 475 m (1,558 ft), (1976–2005)
Month	Jan	Feb	Mar	Apr	May	Jun	Jul	Aug	Sep	Oct	Nov	Dec	Year
Record high °C (°F)	35.9 (96.6)	35.0 (95.0)	34.4 (93.9)	33.4 (92.1)	30.5 (86.9)	29.0 (84.2)	29.2 (84.6)	31.7 (89.1)	34.5 (94.1)	36.8 (98.2)	36.8 (98.2)	36.5 (97.7)	36.8 (98.2)
Mean daily maximum °C (°F)	29.4 (84.9)	29.0 (84.2)	28.1 (82.6)	25.4 (77.7)	21.5 (70.7)	19.1 (66.4)	19.1 (66.4)	21.2 (70.2)	21.8 (71.2)	23.9 (75.0)	26.7 (80.1)	28.9 (84.0)	24.5 (76.1)
Daily mean °C (°F)	22.7 (72.9)	22.5 (72.5)	21.5 (70.7)	18.9 (66.0)	15.0 (59.0)	12.7 (54.9)	12.3 (54.1)	14.0 (57.2)	15.7 (60.3)	18.2 (64.8)	20.2 (68.4)	22.2 (72.0)	18.0 (64.4)
Mean daily minimum °C (°F)	18.8 (65.8)	18.7 (65.7)	17.5 (63.5)	15.1 (59.2)	11.2 (52.2)	9.0 (48.2)	8.4 (47.1)	9.9 (49.8)	12.0 (53.6)	14.3 (57.7)	15.9 (60.6)	17.8 (64.0)	14.1 (57.3)
Record low °C (°F)	8.8 (47.8)	7.5 (45.5)	6.6 (43.9)	1.2 (34.2)	−1.2 (29.8)	−3.4 (25.9)	−4.4 (24.1)	−4.6 (23.7)	2.0 (35.6)	2.2 (36.0)	6.3 (43.3)	10.0 (50.0)	−4.6 (23.7)
Average precipitation mm (inches)	177.0 (6.97)	149.0 (5.87)	104.0 (4.09)	84.0 (3.31)	107.0 (4.21)	112.0 (4.41)	100.0 (3.94)	92.0 (3.62)	149.0 (5.87)	151.0 (5.94)	122.0 (4.80)	138.0 (5.43)	1,485 (58.46)
Average relative humidity (%)	81	81	82	83	85	87	86	84	83	81	77	77	82
Mean monthly sunshine hours	154	138	152	134	129	110	119	127	97	126	158	169	1,613
Source 1: Empresa Brasileira de Pesquisa Agropecuária (EMBRAPA)
Source 2: Climatempo (precipitation)

== See also ==
- List of municipalities in Santa Catarina
