= Miguel Alves =

Coordinates: 4°10′S 42°54′W

- Municipality
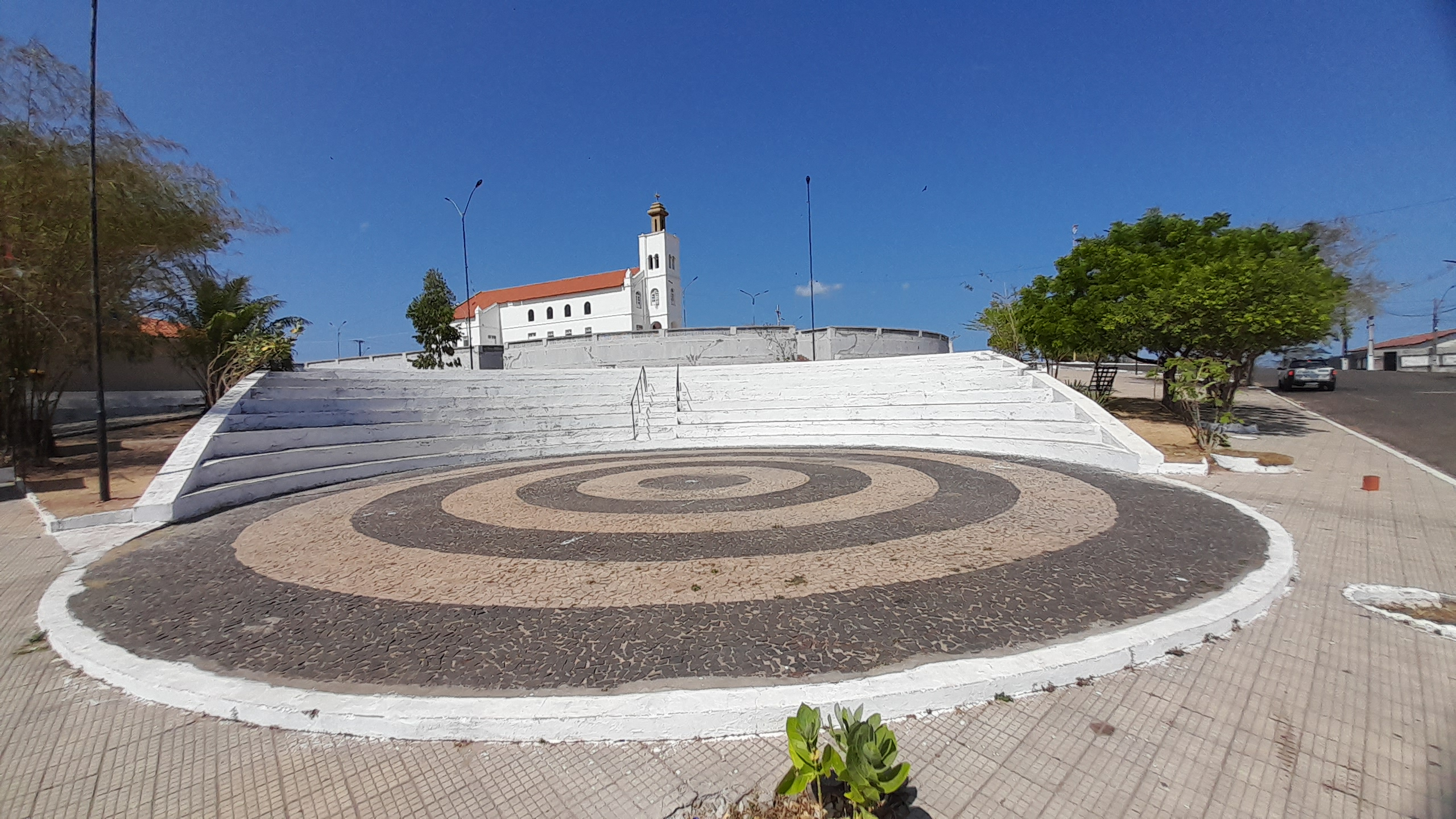

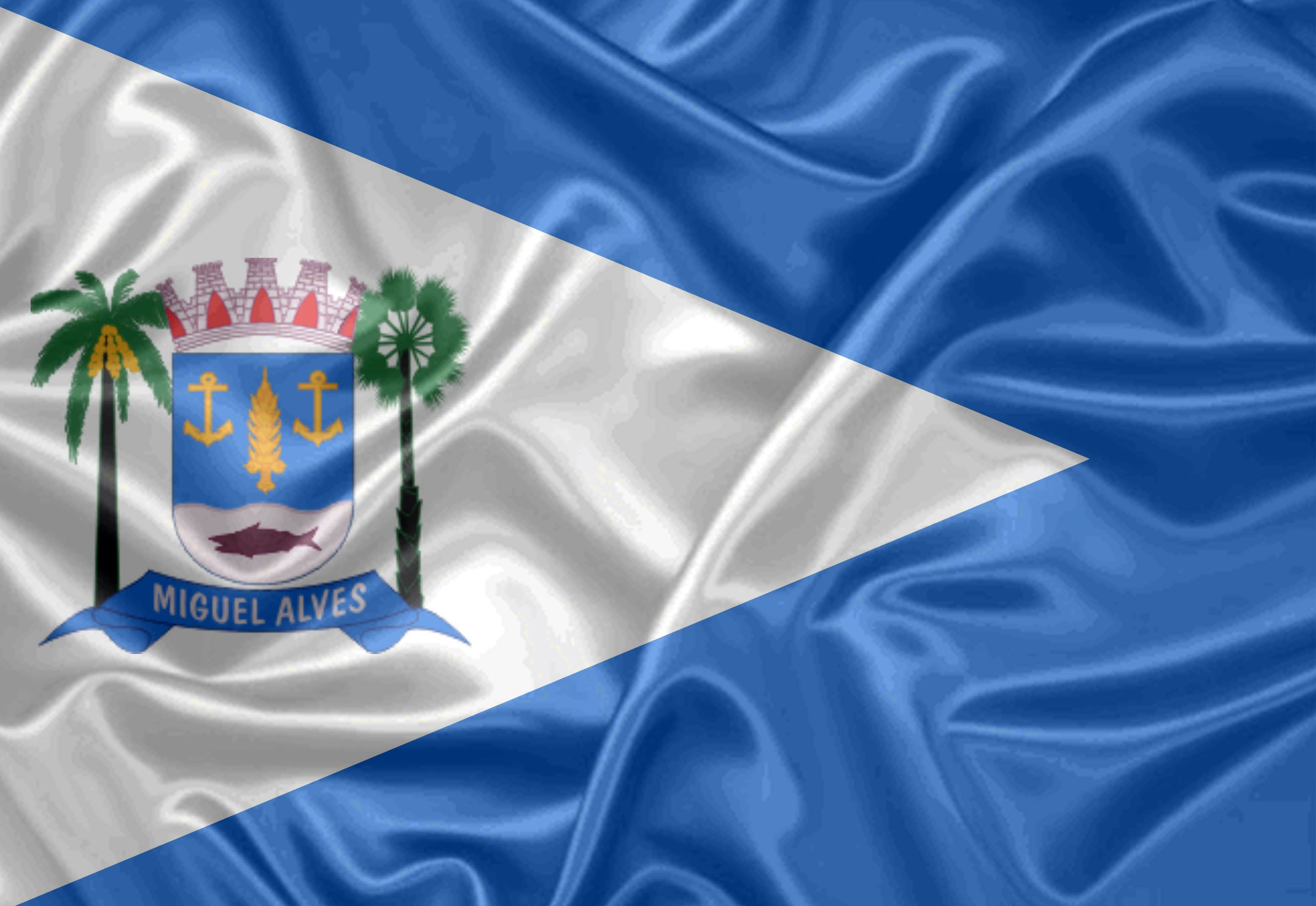
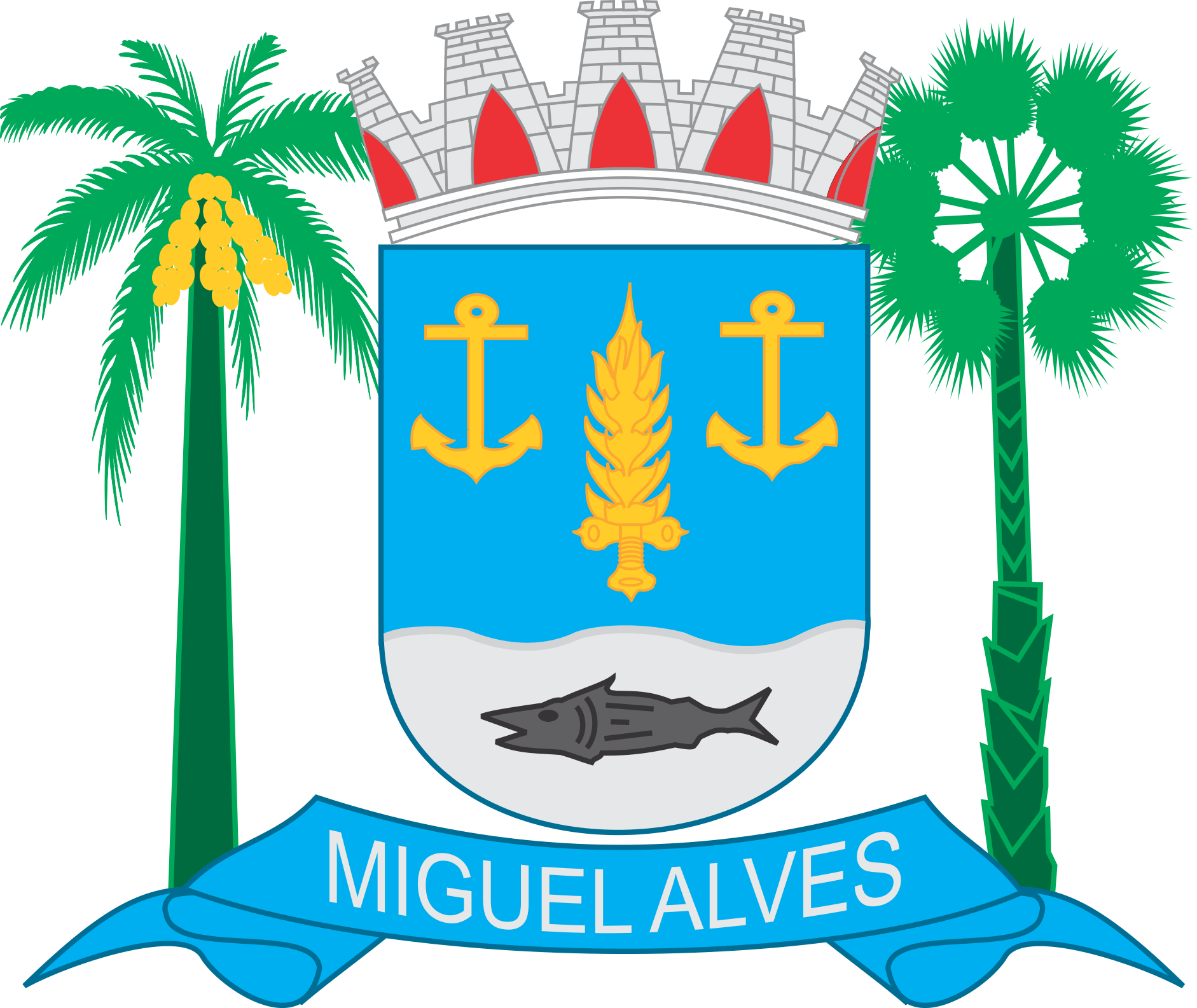
- Flag Coat of arms

- Country: Brazil
- Region: Nordeste
- State: Piauí
- Mesoregion: Norte Piauiense

Population (2020)
  - Total: 33,833
- Time zone: UTC−3 (BRT)

Miguel Alves is a municipality in the state of Piauí in the Northeast region of Brazil.

== See also ==
- List of municipalities in Piauí
