= Miss Brazil 2025 =

71st Miss Brazil competition, national beauty pageant edition

- Date: February 13, 2025
- Presenters: Cris Barth and Gustavo Pardal
- Venue: Coliseu Convenções, Barueri, Brazil
- Broadcaster: Livestream (YouTube)
- Entrants: 24
- Placements: 14
- Withdrawals: Distrito Federal; Rio de Janeiro; Roraima
- Winner: Gabriela Lacerda; Piauí
- Congeniality: Gabriela Lacerda; Piauí

Miss Brazil 2025 (Portuguese: Miss Brasil 2025), officially Miss Universe Brazil 2025 (Portuguese: Miss Universo Brasil 2025) was the 71st edition of the Miss Brazil pageant, held at the Coliseu Convenções, São Paulo on February 13, 2025. This was the last pageant held under Gerson Antonelli, as months after the pageant was held, Antonelli would go on to loose the Miss Universe Brazil franchise license. The franchise license for Brazil at Miss Universe then went to Rodrigo Ferro, who kept the titleholder crowned and final results intact for this edition and will organize next year's pageant.

Iêda Maria Vargas, Miss Universe 1963, crowned Gabriela Lacerda of Piauí as the winner. Lacerda represented Brazil at the Miss Universe 2025 pageant on November 21, 2025, held in Thailand, where she placed in the top 30. Luana Cavalcante of Pernambuco, the outgoing Miss Universe Brazil, was not present.

== Results ==
=== Placements ===
Placement	Contestant
Miss Universe Brazil 2025	Piauí — Gabriela Lacerda
1st Runner-Up	Rio Grande do Sul – Aline Fritsch
2nd Runner-Up	Espírito Santo — Ana Carolina Ceolin
Top 6	Mato Grosso do Sul — Érica Cássia Gonçalves; Paraná – Paula Assunção; Sergipe – Saiury Carvalho
Top 14	Amazonas – Roci Pankov; Ceará – Bruna Ramos del Nero; Mato Grosso – Naila Bózzio; Minas Gerais – Victória Weitzel; Pará – Raquel Albuquerque; Pernambuco – Jade Di Lêu; Santa Catarina – Emanuele Pamplona; São Paulo – Karoline de Morais

== Contestants ==
The confirmed contestants are as follows:

State	Contestant	Age (Note: Ages at the time of the pageant)	Hometown
(Acre (state)) Acre	Layane Castro Veríssimo	22	Rio Branco
Alagoas	Hellyen Fusco	37	Maceió
Amapá	Caroline Calderón Soares	37	Macapá
(Amazonas (Brazilian state)) Amazonas	Rocicleide da Silva Souza Pankov	36	Manaus
Bahia	Leidiane Montes Conceição	32	Madre de Deus
Ceará	Bruna Ramos del Nero	39	Fortaleza
Espírito Santo	Ana Carolina Ceolin Comério	30	Linhares
Goiás	Thaynara Fernandes Silva	31	Anápolis
Maranhão	Nagiely Almeida dos Santos	26	Buriticupu
Mato Grosso	Naila Gabrielli Bózzio Veiga	30	Querência
Mato Grosso do Sul	Érica Cássia Gonçalves da Silva	37	Campo Grande
Minas Gerais	Victória Ananda Weitzel Martínez	31	Uberaba
Pará	Raquel Moraes Albuquerque	28	Marituba
Paraíba	Laíla Marian Ribeiro Alves Coelho	28	João Pessoa
(Paraná (state)) Paraná	Paula Fernanda Assunção	31	Foz do Iguaçu
Pernambuco	Jade de Paula Araújo Di Lêu	27	Recife
Piauí	Maria Gabriela Silva Lacerda	22	Teresina
Rio Grande do Norte	Regiane Meire Araújo do Nascimento	29	Nova Cruz
Rio Grande do Sul	Aline Anthéia Camargo Fritsch	26	Lagoão
Rondônia	Cristina de Souza Leite	51	Porto Velho
(Santa Catarina (state)) Santa Catarina	Emanuele Regina Pamplona	32	Gaspar
(São Paulo (state)) São Paulo	Karoline Aline de Morais Daniel	34	Guarulhos
Sergipe	Saiury Carvalho dos Santos	36	Aracaju
Tocantins	Esline Ferreira da Silva	30	Palmas

== Trivia ==
- Due to the national competition being held forward to February, all state candidates were appointed without a competition being held.
- Six contestants weren't born in the state they represent: Alagoas, Amapá, Ceará, Mato Grosso do Sul, Paraíba and Rondônia.
  - Caroline Fernandes (Amapá) was born in Brasília;
  - Hellyen Fusco (Alagoas) is from São Paulo city;
  - Bruna Del Nero (Ceará) is from Mogi das Cruzes, state of São Paulo;
  - Érica Cássia (Mato Grosso do Sul) was born in Nova Odessa, state of São Paulo;
  - Laila Marian (Paraíba) was born in Natal, state of Rio Grande do Norte;
  - Cristina Leite (Rondônia) is from São Paulo city.
- Roci Pankov (Amazonas) tried the regional crown before, at Miss Universe Amazonas 2015, but she finished as 4th runner-up.
- Ana Carolina Ceolin (Espírito Santo) placed 1st runner-up at Miss Universe Espírito Santo 2024.
- Thaynara Fernandes (Goiás) competed at Miss Universe Brazil 2015 and finished as one of the Top 10 semifinalist.
- Nagiely Almeida (Maranhão) was a contestant at Miss Universe Maranhão in 2019.
- Victória Weitzel (Minas Gerais) placed 1st runner-up at Miss Universe Minas Gerais 2017.
- Raquel Albuquerque (Pará) competed at Miss Brazil for the Miss Brazil World title, in 2024. She placed as one of the 18 semifinalists.
- Paula Assunção (Paraná) placed Top 11 at Miss Eco International 2023. She was also Top 18 at Miss Planet International 2024.
- Jade Di Lêu (Pernambuco) competed at Miss Universe Pernambuco 2023 representing Ilha de Itamaracá.
- Gabriela Lacerda (Piauí) placed 1st runner-up at Miss Universe Brazil 2021.
- Regiane Meire (Rio Grande do Norte) represented Brazil at Miss Aura International 2020 and won the Best National Costume award.
- Emanuele Pamplona (Santa Catarina) competed at Miss Universe Santa Catarina 3 times: 2011 (unplaced), 2015 (Top 10) and 2017 (1st runner-up).
- This will be the 2nd attempt of Saiury Carvalho (Sergipe) in Miss Brazil, she was Top 05 at the 2017 edition.

== Crossovers ==
=== International pageants ===
Miss Aura International

- 2020: Rio Grande do Norte - Regiane Meire (Best National Costume)
  - Representing Brazil in Turkey.

Miss Eco International

- 2023: Paraná - Paula Assunção (Top 11)
  - Representing Brazil in Egypt.

Miss Planet International

- 2024: Paraná - Paula Assunção (Top 18)
  - Representing Brazil in Cambodia.
