= Várzea do Poço =

- Municipality
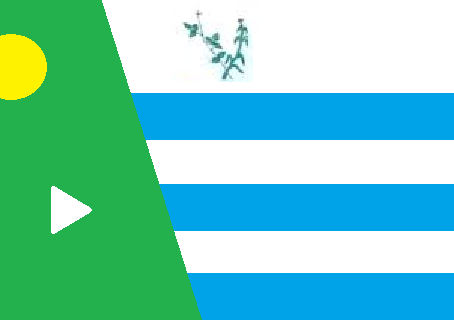
- Flag

- Location in Bahia state

- Location in Brazil
- Coordinates: 11.529°S 40.32°W
- Country: Brazil
- Region: Northeast
- State: Bahia
- Mesoregion: Centro-Norte Baiano
- Microregion: Jacobina

Area
  - Total: 206.5 km^{2} (79.7 sq mi)

Population (2020)
  - Total: 9,210
  - Density: 44.6/km^{2} (116/sq mi)
- Time zone: UTC−3 (BRT)

Várzea do Poço is a municipality in the state of Bahia in the North-East region of Brazil. Its population was 9,210 (2020) and its area is 206.5 km^{2}.

== See also ==
- List of municipalities in Bahia
