= Campinápolis =

- Municipality
- Coordinates: 14°32′35″S 52°47′39″W
- Country: Brazil
- Region: Center-West
- State: Mato Grosso
- Mesoregion: Nordeste Mato-Grossense

Population (2020)
  - Total: 16,919
- Time zone: UTC−3 (BRT)

Campinápolis is a municipality in the state of Mato Grosso in the Central-West Region of Brazil.

== See also ==
- List of municipalities in Mato Grosso
