= Tibau =

Municipality in Rio Grande do Norte, Brazil

- Municipality
- The Municipality of Tibau
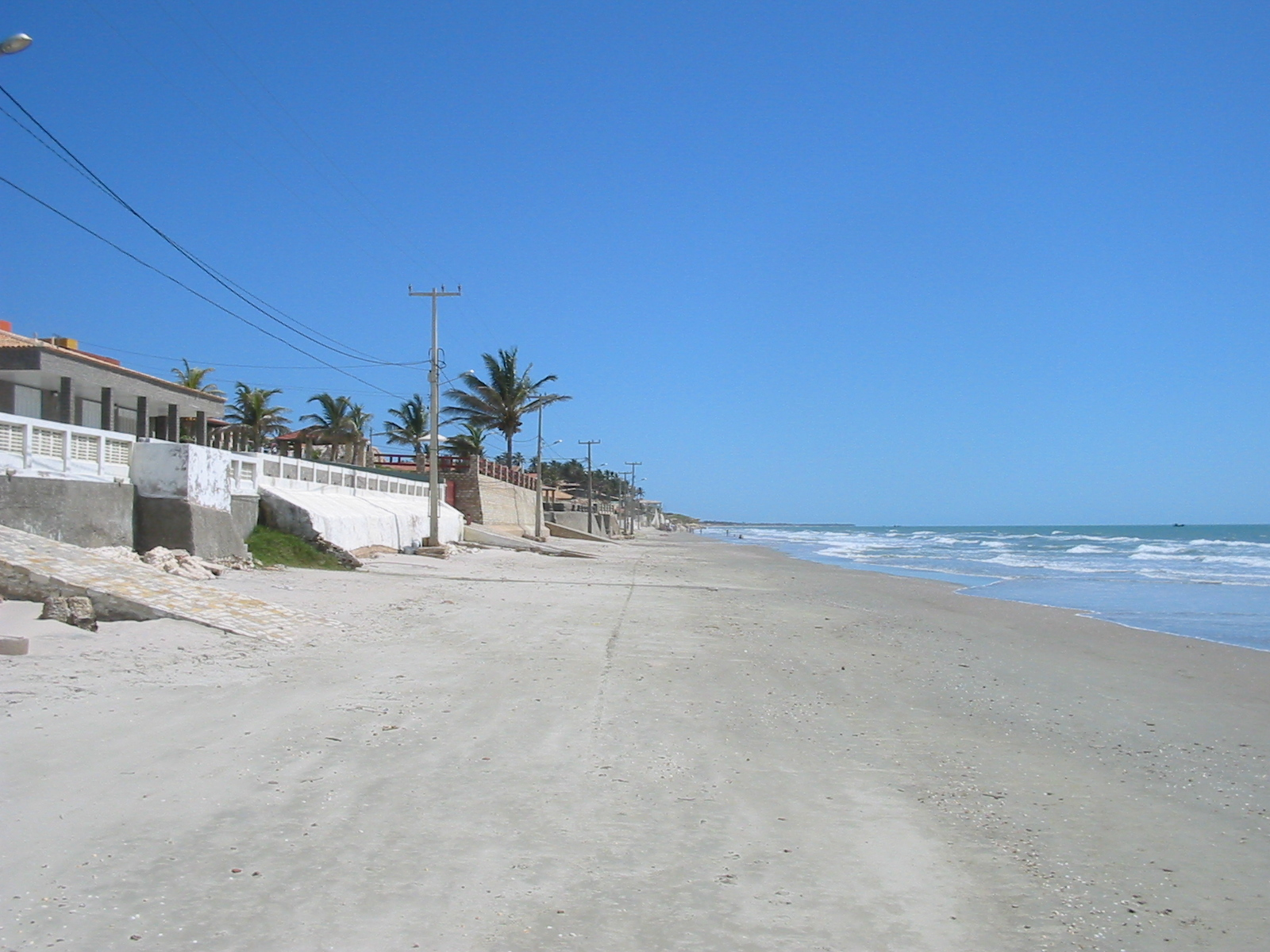
- Tibau beach

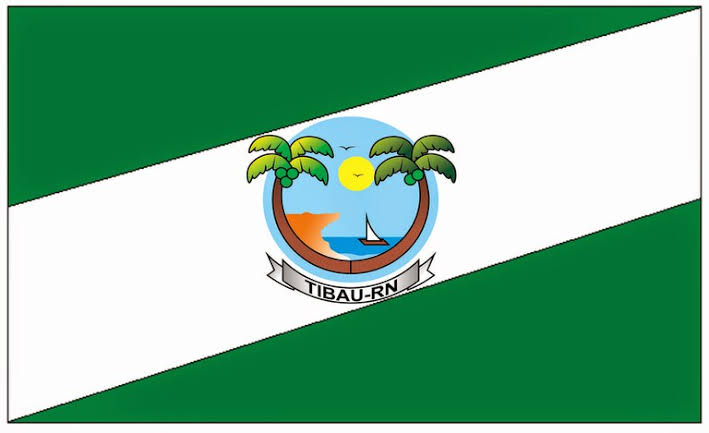
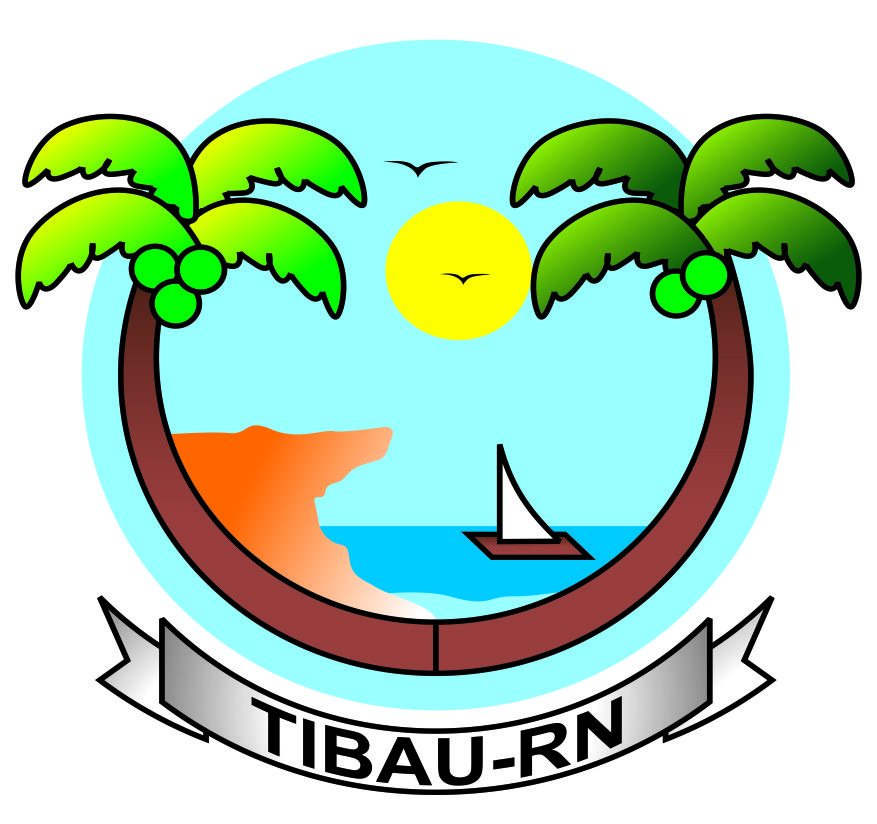
- Flag Coat of arms
- Nicknames: "A praia de Mossoró" ("The Beach of Mossoró") and "Tibau do Norte" ("North Tibau")
- Location of Tibau
- Coordinates: 04°50′13″S 37°15′10″W
- Country: Brazil
- Region: Northeast
- State: Rio Grande do Norte
- Founded: 1997

Government
  - Mayor: Francisco Nilo Nolasco

Area
  - Total: 162.402 km^{2} (62.704 sq mi)

Population (2020)
  - Total: 4,140
  - Density: 25/km^{2} (65/sq mi)
- Time zone: UTC−3 (BRT)
- HDI (2000): 0.788 – medium

Tibau is the northernmost city in the Brazilian state of Rio Grande do Norte. It is also the last coastal city (going east–west) of that state before Ceará. One of the main sources of income for the city is within the fishing and farming industry.
