= Jaciara =

Coordinates: 15°59′S 54°57′W

- Municipality
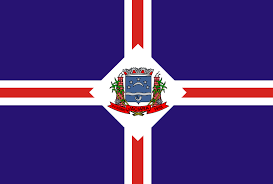
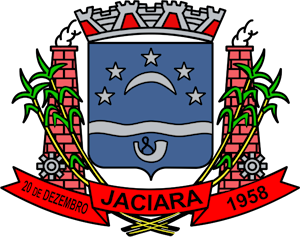
- Flag Coat of arms

- Country: Brazil
- Region: Center-West
- State: Mato Grosso
- Mesoregion: Sudeste Mato-Grossense
- Elevation: 1,194 ft (364 m)

Population (2020)
  - Total: 27,807
- Time zone: UTC−3 (BRT)

Jaciara is a municipality in the state of Mato Grosso in the Central-West Region of Brazil.

== See also ==
- List of municipalities in Mato Grosso
