= Miss Piauí =

Miss Piauí Miss Universe Piauí
- Formation: 1956
- Type: Beauty pageant
- Headquarters: Piauí, Brazil
- Members: Miss Brazil
- Official language: Portuguese
- State director: Mateus Alves

Miss Piauí is a Brazilian Beauty pageant which selects the representative for the State of Piauí at the Miss Brazil contest. The pageant was created in 1956 and has been held every year since with the exception of 1990–1991, 1993, and 2020. The pageant is held annually with representation of several municipalities. Since 2025, the State director for Miss Piauí has been Mateus Alves. Piauí has won only two crowns in the national contest: with Monalysa Maria Alcântara Nascimento, from Teresina, in 2017; and 2025 with Maria Gabriela Silva Lacerda, also from Teresina.

== Gallery of Titleholders ==
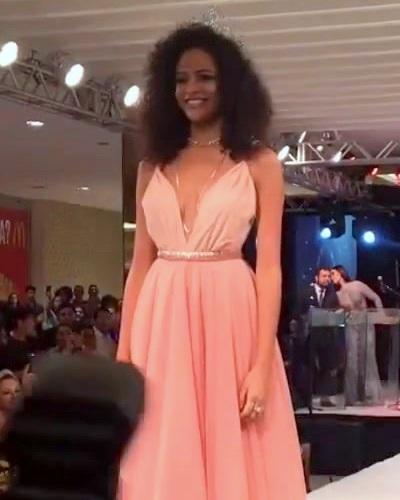
Miss Piauí 2017, and Miss Brazil 2017
Monalysa Maria Alcântara Nascimento

== Titleholders ==
Year	Name	Age (Note: Ages at the time of the pageant)	Height	Represented	Miss Brazil placement	Notes
2025	Maria Gabriela Silva Lacerda	24	1.77 m (5 ft 9 1/2 in)	Teresina	Miss Brazil 2025	Miss Congeniality and Top 30 at Miss Universe 2025.
2024	Gabriela Rodrigues dos Santos	19	1.70 m (5 ft 7 in)	Água Branca		Also known as "Gabriela Pessoa"
2023	Gabriela Reis Menezes	26	1.64 m (5 ft 4 1/2 in)	Parnaíba		
2022	Jéssyca Machado Silva Castro	24	1.68 m (5 ft 6 in)	Teresina	Top 16	2nd runner-up at Miss Piauí 2018
2021	Maria Gabriela Silva Lacerda	19	1.77 m (5 ft 9 1/2 in)	Teresina	1st runner-up	Miss Congeniality and Top 12 at Miss Teen Mundial 2017.
2020	No national Miss Brazil contest due to the COVID-19 pandemic.					
2019	Dagmara da Silva Landim	22	1.77 m (5 ft 9 1/2 in)	São Raimundo Nonato	Top 10	
2018	Naiely Raquel Lima Moura	18	1.82 m (5 ft 11 1/2 in)	Piripiri	Top 10	
2017	Monalysa Maria Alcântara	18	1.77 m (5 ft 9 1/2 in)	Teresina	Miss Brazil 2017	Top 10 at Miss Universe 2017.
2016	Lara Bucar Lobo Pinho	20	1.70 m (5 ft 7 in)	Floriano		
2015	Ana Letícia Alencar	21	1.83 m (6 ft 0 in)	Picos	Top 15	Niece of Miss Piauí 1985.
2014	Verbiany Leal Silva	23	1.80 m (5 ft 11 in)	Batalha		Competed at Miss Brazil World 2009.
2013	Nathálya Rakel de Araújo	23	1.77 m (5 ft 9 1/2 in)	Castelo do Piauí		
2012	Jéssica Camargo Eberhart	21	1.79 m (5 ft 10 1/2 in)	Teresina		
2011	Renata Bruna Lustosa Mororó	22	1.79 m (5 ft 10 1/2 in)	Campo Maior		Miss Congeniality
2010	Lanna Camilla Alves Lopes	18	1.85 m (6 ft 1 in)	Ipiranga do Piauí		Top 07 at Miss Maranhão 2013.
2009	Francisca Vanessa Barros Costa	22	1.70 m (5 ft 7 in)	Teresina		
2008	Marinna de Paiva Lima	19	1.72 m (5 ft 7 1/2 in)	Altos	Top 15	
2007	Amanda Costa Santos	23	1.68 m (5 ft 6 in)	Bom Jesus		
2006	Priscila Karine da Silva Rocha	18	1.70 m (5 ft 7 in)	Floriano		Competed at Miss Brazil Globe 2007.
2005	Verônica Scheren de Oliveira	19	1.75 m (5 ft 9 in)	Eliseu Martins		
2004	Shenia Layanne Magalhães	20	1.72 m (5 ft 7 1/2 in)	Piracuruca		
2003	Elaine Fernandes Silva	18	1.75 m (5 ft 9 in)	Campo Largo do Piauí		
2002	Rosiane Lima de Oliveira			Curimatá		
2001	Emanuelle dos Santos Aguiar			Barras		
2000	Darlyanne de Moura Santos			Dom Expedito Lopes		Miss Congeniality
1999	Lílian de Melo Barros			José de Freitas		
1998	Karina de Castro Demes			Floriano		
1997	Lainny de Fátima Holanda			Parnaíba	Top 12	
1996	Maria José Meneses de Santana			União		Best National Costume
1995	Jamilly Rebecca Bezerra Fiúzza			Teresina		
1994	Anacy Pereira da Silva			Oeiras		
1993	No delegate sent in 1993.					
1992	Patrícia Gonçalves da Silva			Teresina		
1991	No delegate sent in 1991.					
1990	No pageant held in 1990.					
1989	Josélia da Silva Ribeiro			Bonfim do Piauí		
1988	Lucenir Dantas de França					
1987	Polikseny Jean Castelo Branco			Parnaíba		
1986	Célia Regina Farias de Araújo			Parnaíba		Best in Evening Gown
1985	Conceição Bezerra Alencar			Clube de Engenharia		
1984	Milena de Souza Teixeira			Clube de Engenharia		Miss Congeniality and Best in Evening Gown
1983	Mirza dos Santos Melo			Parnaíba	Top 12	First ever state classification in the national.
1982	Valéria Umbelino Guedes			Floriano		
1981	Rosa Cláudia Moura Carvalho			Fronteiras		
1980	Tatiana Vasconcelos Cavalcante					
1979	Regina Lúcia de França			Agremiação "Show Samba"		
1978	Márcia Milânia Neto Bezerra					Born in Pernambuco.
1977	Eliane Freire de Carvalho			Teresina		
1976	Glayds Alcântara da Trindade			Teresina		Later resigned after competing for Miss Brazil.
1976	Claudeth Liberato Santana			Parnaíba	Did not compete	Assumed after the original winner resigned.
1975	Maria Yarema Rodrigues Melo			Agremiação "Skindô"		
1974	Claudeth Barros de Moraes Trindade			Agremiação "Sambão"		Miss Congeniality
1973	Maria Débora Rodrigues Melo			Clube dos Estudantes do Piauí		
1972	Carlota Maria de Carvalho			Sociedade Esportiva Tiradentes		
1971	Maria de Fátima Ferreira Macêdo			Clube dos Médicos		
1970	Maria da Graça de Brito Holanda			Parnaíba		
1969	Rosângela Barreto Cordeiro			Teresina		
1968	Ana Aurora Aragão			Campo Maior		
1967	Anamaria Miranda Gonçalves			União		
1966	Darcy do Carmo Lima Assunção			Altos		
1965	Maria da Graça Melo da Mota			Teresina		
1964	Maricildes Ferreira da Costa			Floriano		
1963	Maria da Consolação Teixeira			Jockey Club do Piauí		
1962	Lívia Melo Carneiro da Cunha			Aeroclube do Piauí		
1961	Daisy Maria Couto Boavista			Clube dos Diários		
1960	Idjanira Portela de Araújo			Teresina		
1959	Vera Zorina Neiva Nunes			Clube dos Diários		
1958	Maria Creuza Portela Madeira			Teresina		
1957	Chloris Maria Guimarães Fontenelle			Parnaíba		
1956	Teresinha de Jesus Estêves Alcântara			Clube dos Diários		
1955	No delegate sent in 1954 & 1955.					
1954	No delegate sent in 1954 & 1955.					
