= Miss Tocantins =

Miss Tocantins Miss Universe Tocantins
- Formation: 1989
- Type: Beauty pageant
- Headquarters: Tocantins, Brazil
- Members: Miss Brazil
- Official language: Portuguese
- State Director: Raffael Rodrigues

Miss Tocantins is a Brazilian Beauty pageant which selects the representative for the State of Tocantins at the Miss Brazil contest. The pageant was created in 1989 and has been held every year since with the exception of 1990–1991, 1993, and 2020. The pageant is held annually with representation of several municipalities. Since 2021, the State director of Miss Tocantins is, Raffael Rodrigues. Tocantins has won only one crown in the national contest:

- Gislaine Rodrigues Ferreira, from Patos de Minas, MG/Palmas, in 2003.

== Results summary ==
=== Placements ===
- Miss Brazil: Gislaine Ferreira (2003).
- 1st Runner-Up:
- 2nd Runner-Up:
- 3rd Runner-Up: Francielly de Oliveira Araújo (2005).
- 4th Runner-Up:
- Top 10: Camilla Ribeiro (2006); Suymara Barreto (2010); Alessandra Almeida (2019); Luciana Gomes (2021).
- Top 12: Marina Quites (1994).
- Top 16: Islane Rocha (2017).

== Titleholders ==
No delegates were sent between 1954 and 1988 as the contest didn't exist until 1989.

Year	Name	Age (Note: Ages at the time of the pageant)	Height	Represented	Miss Brazil placement	Notes
Miss Universe Tocantins
2026	Karina Silva de Azevêdo	37	1.78 m (5 ft 10 in)	Palmas	Top 20	Originally from São Paulo. The oldest contestant to be appointed as Miss Tocantins. 4th runner-up at Miss São Paulo 2026. Top 9 at Miss Brazil for Miss Intercontinental 2025 pageant.
2025	Esline Ferreira da Silva	30	1.70 m (5 ft 7 in)	Palmas		Also known as "Esline Vesper". Won Miss Latinoamérica 2019 representing Brazil in Arequipa, Peru. Miss Tocantins Globe for Miss Brazil Globe 2018.
2024	Jackeline Balestra de Oliveira	29	1.70 m (5 ft 7 in)	Gurupi		First mother to be appointed as Miss Tocantins.
2023	Victória Guarda Schneider	23	1.75 m (5 ft 9 in)	Palmas	Top 16	Former Tennis athlete from Evert Tennis Academy, Florida. Graduated in International Relations by Rollins College.
2022	Phatricia Costa Araújo	21	1.77 m (5 ft 9 1/2 in)	Palmas		First contestant to assume homosexuality in the Miss Brazil pageant.
2021	Luciana Cirqueira Gomes	26	1.67 m (5 ft 5 1/2 in)	Palmas	Top 10	Born in Porto Nacional. Later "Miss Grand Tocantins" and 2nd-runner-up at Miss Grand Brazil 2023. Top 10 at Reinado Internacional del Café 2024.
U Miss Tocantins 2020 and Miss Tocantins Be Emotion 2020
2020	No national Miss Brazil contest due to the COVID-19 pandemic and change in the national franchise holder which caused the national titleholder to be appointed.					
Miss Tocantins Be Emotion
2019	Alessandra Kely Farias de Almeida	19	1.77 m (5 ft 9 1/2 in)	Tocantinópolis	Top 10	
2018	Tatiele Rodrigues da Silva	19	1.68 m (5 ft 6 in)	Porto Nacional		
2017	Islane Machado Rocha	21	1.82 m (5 ft 11 1/2 in)	Dueré	Top 16	Highest contestant elected Miss Tocantins.
2016	Jaqueline Ribeiro Verrel	24	1.75 m (5 ft 9 in)	Dueré		2nd attempt (2011). Miss Earth Tocantins for Miss Earth Brazil 2013. Miss World Tocantins for Miss World Brazil 2015.
2015	Karla Sucupira Mota	26	1.73 m (5 ft 8 in)	Gurupi		Assumed the title after Bruna Gomides resigned. Arrested in 2022 for causing damage to the public treasury.
Miss Tocantins Universe
2014	Wizelany Marques Costa	20	1.73 m (5 ft 8 in)	Palmas		Born in Brasília. First ever black woman to represent the state. 2nd runner-up at Miss Universe Distrito Federal 2014.
2013	Wiolana Barbosa Brito	20	1.76 m (5 ft 9 1/2 in)	Tocantinópolis		
2012	Viviane de Moura Fragoso	22	1.78 m (5 ft 10 in)	Almas		Born in Rio Grande do Sul state.
Miss Tocantins
2011	Jaqueline Ribeiro Verrel	18	1.75 m (5 ft 9 in)	Porto Nacional		Disqualified during ENEM 2010.
2010	Suymara Barreto Parreira	25	1.79 m (5 ft 10 1/2 in)	Palmeirópolis	Top 10	Born in Pará state. Assumed the title after "Jaqueline Verrel" resigned (she was only 17). 1st runner-up at Miss Goiás 2010. 2nd runner-up at "Miss World Brazil 2010" representing Rondônia state. Top 20 at Miss Supranational 2011.
2009	Natália Araújo Bichuete	18	1.70 m (5 ft 7 in)	Araguaína		Assumed the title after Priscila Nascimento resigned (she was about the complete 26).
2008	Kelly Bezerra de Aquino			Pindorama do Tocantins		Born in Pará state.
2007	Jaqueline Pereira de Moura			Porto Nacional		
2006	Camilla Christie Ribeiro Oliveira			Pedro Afonso	Top 10	Born in Goiás state.
2005	Francielly de Oliveira Araújo			Palmeirópolis	3rd Runner-Up	Born in Goiás state.
2004	Fânia Marielle Teixeira	19		Peixe		Born in Goiás state. Elected in 2003, but only competed in the next year.
2003	Gislaine Rodrigues Ferreira	19	1.73 m (5 ft 8 in)	Palmas	Miss Brazil 2003	Born in Minas Gerais state. 1st runner-up at Miss Minas Gerais 2003; Miss Popular Vote during Miss Brasil 2003 pageant. Top 10 at Miss Universe 2003.
2002	Daniella Dias Fernandes	16				The youngest state representative.
2001	Nathália Lourenço Rodrigues					
2000	Isabele Araújo Domingos					
1999	Luziane "Lu" Baierle					Born in Paraná state. Became an actress and tv personality in Brazil.
1998	Paula de Athayde Rochel					
1997	Cláudia de Almeida					
1996	Ana Paula do Carmo			Miracema do Tocantins		
1995	Lorena Rodrigues					
1994	Marina Quites			Palmas	Top 12	Born in São Paulo state. Miss Brazil for Miss Globe International in 1994.
1993	No delegate sent in 1993 due to Miss Brazil 1993 being appointed rather than having a contest.					
1992	Zélia Barros Fonsêca			Gurupi		
1991	No delegate sent in 1991.					
1990	No contest in 1990.					
1989	Marta Maria Gomes	19		Miracema do Tocantins		
