= Miss Pernambuco =

Miss Pernambuco Miss Universe Pernambuco
- Formation: 1955
- Type: Beauty pageant
- Headquarters: Pernambuco, Brazil
- Members: Miss Brazil
- Official language: Portuguese
- State Director: Romildo Alves

Miss Pernambuco is a Brazilian Beauty pageant which selects the representative for the State of Pernambuco at the Miss Brazil contest. The pageant was created in 1955 and has been held every year since with the exception of 1990, and 1993. The pageant is held annually with representation of several municipalities. The competition was organized for thirty years by Miguel Braga (1990 to 2020) but Braga died in 2021. Since 2021, the State director for Miss Pernambuco is Romildo Alves. Pernambuco has won only one crown in the national contest.

The following women have represented Pernambuco in the national contest and won:

- Luana Cavalcante Farsoni, from Recife, in 2024

== Gallery of Titleholders ==
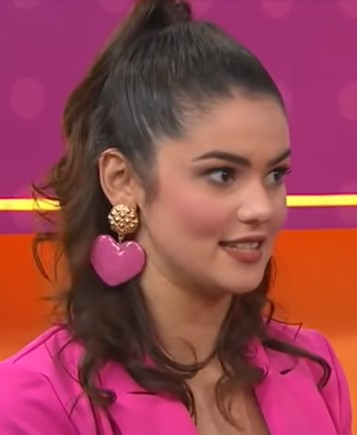
Miss Pernambuco 2018
Eslovênia Marques

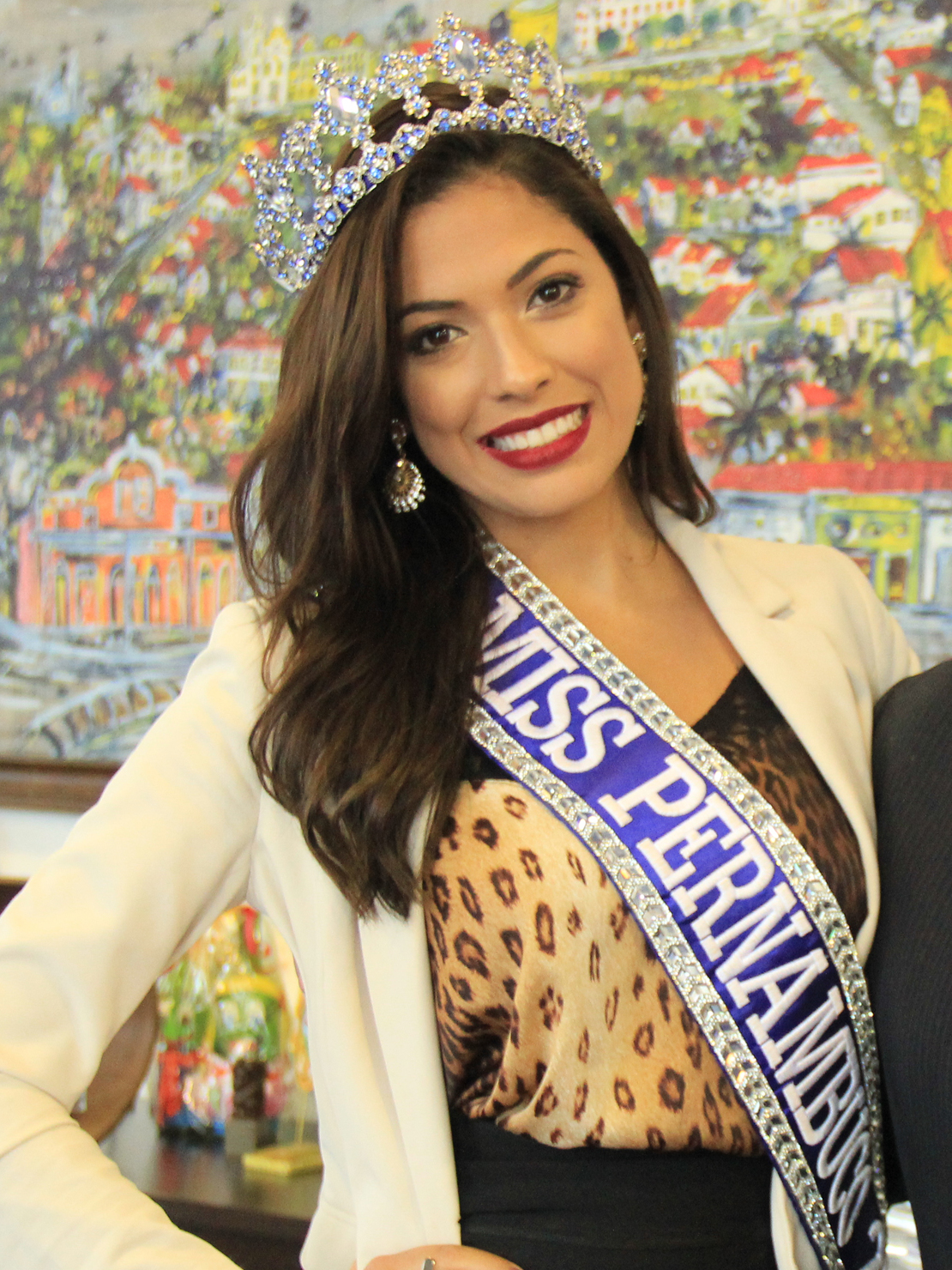
Miss Pernambuco 2015
Sayonara Alves Veras

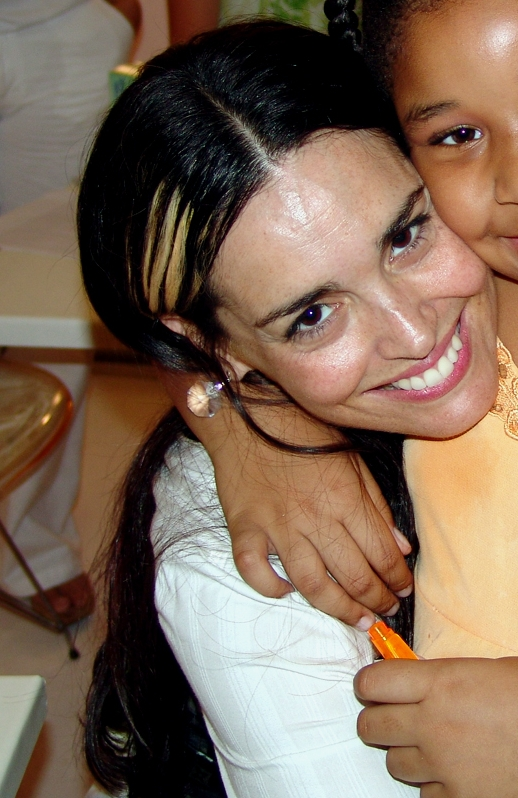
Miss Pernambuco 1984
Suzy Sheila Rêgo

== Results summary ==
=== Placements ===
- Miss Brazil: Luana Cavalcante Farsoni (2024)
- 1st Runner-Up: Sônia Maria Campos (1958); Dione Brito de Oliveira (1959); Suzy Sheila Rêgo (1984)
- 2nd Runner-Up: Maria Edilene Torreão (1960); Simone Valença Duque (1982); Milena Ricarda de Lima Lira (2002; later 1st Runner-Up)
- 3rd Runner-Up: Ana Maria Costa Caldas (1964); Maria Madalena Jácome Brito (1972); Débora de Araújo Daggy (2001); Wilma Magda Ferreira Gomes (2007)
- 4th Runner-Up: Ângela Agra Galvão (1978); Rita de Cássia Spencer (1981)
- Top 5/Top 7/Top 8/Top 9: Maria Lúcia Santa Cruz (1961); Iully Thaísa Bezerra (2017)
- Top 10/Top 11/Top 12: Anne Elizabeth Brasileiro (1979); Ana Lúcia Caldas de Souza (1980); Flávia Maria Guimarães (1986); Ana Maria Guimarães (1988); Cláudia Pessoa Romão (1992); Tatiana Galvão Queiroga (1996); Rayana Carvalho de Magalhães (2006); Helena de Castro Rios (2013); Eslovênia Marques (2018)
- Top 14/Top 15/Top 16: Michelle Fernandes da Costa (2008); Sayonara Alves Veras (2015); Tallita Lima Martins (2016); Millena Vasconcelos (2021); Maria Erivânia Izídio Souza (2023); Jade de Paula Araújo Di Lêu (2025)

=== Special awards ===
- Miss Congeniality: Wilma Magda Ferreira Gomes (2007); Isabela dos Santos Nascimento (2009)
- Miss Photogenic:
- Best State Costume:

== Titleholders ==
Year	Name	Age (Note: Ages at the time of the pageant)	Height	Represented	Miss Brazil placement	Notes
Miss Universe Pernambuco
2026	Maria Sabrina de Fátima Monteiro	22	1.68 m (5 ft 6 in)	Greater Recife	TBD	
2025	Jade de Paula Araújo Di Lêu	27		Recife	Top 14	
2024	Luana Cavalcante Farsoni	25	1.74 m (5 ft 8 1/2 in)	Recife	Miss Brazil 2024	Unplaced at Miss Universe 2024.
2023	Maria Erivânia Izídio Souza	24	1.66 m (5 ft 5 1/2 in)	Santa Cruz do Capibaribe	Top 16	
2022	Ana Luiza Gonçalves da Nóbrega	26	1.73 m (5 ft 8 in)	Petrolina		1st Runner-Up at Miss Universe Pernambuco 2021.
2021	Millena Vasconcelos	24	1.75 m (5 ft 9 in)	Sairé	Top 15	
U Miss Pernambuco 2020 and Miss Pernambuco Be Emotion 2020
2020	No national Miss Brazil contest due to the COVID-19 pandemic and change in the national franchise holder which caused the national titleholder to be appointed.					
2020	Guilhermina Montarroyos	19	1.70 m (5 ft 7 in)	Moreno	Did not compete	Last Miss Miss Pernambuco Be Emotion; No national contest held.
Miss Pernambuco Be Emotion
2019	Bárbara Souza	22	1.79 m (5 ft 10 1/2 in)	Recife		
2018	Eslovênia Marques	21	1.77 m (5 ft 9 1/2 in)	Caruaru	Top 10	
2017	Iully Thaísa Bezerra	22	1.74 m (5 ft 8 1/2 in)	Tamandaré	Top 5	Later Miss Fernando de Noronha CNB 2019 and competed in Miss Brazil CNB 2019.
2016	Tallita Lima Martins	20	1.74 m (5 ft 8 1/2 in)	Serra Talhada	Top 15	Later Miss Pernambuco CNB 2018 and Top 21 at Miss Brazil CNB 2018.
2015	Sayonara Alves Veras	22	1.73 m (5 ft 8 in)	Olinda	Top 15	
Miss Pernambuco Universe
2014	Rhayanne Crysthinne Nery	19	1.75 m (5 ft 9 in)	Recife		
2013	Helena de Castro Rios	20	1.72 m (5 ft 7 1/2 in)	Recife	Top 10	
2012	Paula Lück Peres	20	1.80 m (5 ft 11 in)	Jaboatão dos Guararapes		
Miss Pernambuco
2011	Leidyane Vasconcelos			Santa Cruz do Capibaribe		
2010	Luzielle Rayana Vasconcelos	20		Bezerros		
2009	Isabela dos Santos Nascimento			Universidade Federal de Pernambuco		Won Miss Congeniality in the pageant.
2008	Michelle Fernandes da Costa			Faculdade Maurício de Nassau	Top 15	
2007	Wilma Magda Ferreira Gomes			Faculdade Maurício de Nassau	3rd Runner-Up	Also won Miss Congeniality in the pageant.
2006	Rayana Carvalho de Magalhães			Aliança	Top 10	
2005	Carolline de Castilhos Medeiros			São Lourenço da Mata		
2004	Amanda Hermínio Nolasco			Vitória de Santo Antão		
2003	Meyrielle Abrantes Barbosa			Vitória de Santo Antão		
2002	Milena Ricarda de Lima Lira			Bom Jardim	2nd Runner-Up; Miss Brazil International 2002 (later 1st Runner-Up)	Unplaced at Miss International 2002 later was elevated to the position of 1st Runner-Up after the original 1st Runner-Up was elevated to Miss Brazil after the original winner was dethroned for being married.
2001	Débora de Araújo Daggy			Jaboatão dos Guararapes	3rd Runner-Up	
2000	Djanira Barbosa Pereira			Santa Cruz do Capibaribe		
1999	Jadilza Bernardo Carvalho			Jataúba		
1998	Adriana da Silva Cabral			Caruaru		
1997	Carolina Olímpia Portella			Olinda		
1996	Tatiana Galvão Queiroga			Sport Club do Recife	Top 12	
1995	Viviane Augusto Costa			Igarassu		
1994	Núbia Rejane de Santana			São Lourenço da Mata		
1993	No delegate sent in 1993 due to Miss Brazil 1993 being appointed rather than having a contest.					
1992	Cláudia Pessoa Romão			Associação PCEF	Top 12	
1991	Ana Cristina de Medeiros			Gravatá		First woman to be crowned Miss Pernambuco twice. Previously crowned in 1989.
1990	No contest in 1990.					
1989	Ana Cristina de Medeiros			Gravatá		Crowned again in 1991.
1988	Ana Maria Guimarães			Clube Rodoviário	Top 12	
1987	Margarida Dijá Brasileiro			Ele & Ela Modas		
1986	Flávia Maria Guimarães			Clube Internacional do Recife	Top 12	
1985	Simone Augusto Costa			Clube Português do Recife		
1984	Suzy Sheila Rêgo			Ilha de Itamaracá	1st Runner-Up	
1983	Mônica Cardoso Lima			Igarassu		
1982	Simone Valença Duque			Clube Internacional do Recife	2nd Runner-Up	
1981	Rita de Cássia Spencer			São Benedito do Sul	4th Runner-Up	
1980	Ana Lúcia Caldas de Souza			Clube Internacional do Recife	Top 10	
1979	Anne Elizabeth Brasileiro			Aeroclube do Recife	Top 12	
1978	Ângela Agra Galvão			Clube Português do Recife	4th Runner-Up	
1977	Zilene de Sá Torres			Goiana		
1976	Matilde de Souza Terto			Serra Talhada		
1975	Maria de Fátima Mourato			Serra Talhada		
1974	Cilene Bezerra da Costa			Serra Talhada		
1973	Enilda Ramos de Sá Barreto			Ass. Universitária do Trabalho		
1972	Maria Madalena Jácome Brito			ESURP	3rd Runner-Up	
1971	Dilene Maria Roberto de Araújo			Garanhuns		
1970	Ana Almeny de Arruda Corrêa			Surubim		
1969	Maria Jerusa Freitas Farias			Belo Jardim		
1968	Eunice Mergulhão Maciel			Caruaru		
1967	Vera Maria da Silva Dias			Círculo Militar do Recife		
1966	Raiolanda Castello Branco			Círculo Militar do Recife		
1965	Alda Maria Simonetti Maia			Sport Club do Recife		
1964	Ana Maria Costa Caldas			Clube Náutico Capibaribe	3rd Runner-Up	
1963	Vera Lúcia Torres Bezerra			Clube Náutico Capibaribe		
1962	Terezinha Costa Frazão			Clube Português do Recife		
1961	Maria Lúcia Santa Cruz			Clube Internacional do Recife	Top 8	
1960	Maria Edilene Torreão			Santa Cruz Futebol Clube	2nd Runner-Up; Miss Brazil World 1960	Top 10 at Miss World 1960.
1959	Dione Brito de Oliveira			Clube Intermunicipal de Caruaru	1st Runner-Up; Miss Brazil World 1959	Unplaced at Miss World 1959.
1958	Sônia Maria Campos			Santa Cruz Futebol Clube	1st Runner-Up; Miss Brazil World 1958	Unplaced at Miss World 1958.
1957	Zayra Moreira Pimentel			Clube Náutico Capibaribe		
1956	Nelbe Souza Chateaubriand			Clube Náutico Capibaribe		
1955	Alba Carneiro de Souza Leão			Aeroclube do Recife		
1954	No delegate sent in 1954 as the contest didn't exist until 1955.					

== Miss Fernando de Noronha ==
Miss Fernando de Noronha
- Formation: 1969
- Dissolved: 1988
- Type: Beauty pageant
- Headquarters: Fernando de Noronha, Pernambuco, Brazil
- Members: Miss Brazil
- Official language: Portuguese

Miss Fernando de Noronha was a Brazilian Beauty pageant which selected the representative for the Territory of Fernando de Noronha at the Miss Brazil contest. The pageant was created in 1969 but was stopped in 1988 due to the territory becoming part of the State of Pernambuco. Fernando de Noronha never won any crowns in the national contest.

=== Results summary ===
==== Placements ====
- Miss Brazil:
- 1st Runner-Up: Suzanne Albuquerque (1985)
- 2nd Runner-Up:
- 3rd Runner-Up:
- 4th Runner-Up: Deborah Proença de Moura (1983)
- Top 5/Top 7/Top 8/Top 9:
- Top 10/Top 11/Top 12: Teresa Cristina dos Santos (1984)
- Top 15/Top 16:

=== Titleholders ===
Year	Name	Age (Note: Ages at the time of the pageant)	Height	Represented	Miss Brazil placement	Notes
Miss Fernando de Noronha
1988	Eva Márcia Raja Gabaglia			Appointed		Previously 1st Runner-Up at Miss Brasília 1986 and was invited to represent then Territory of Fernando de Noronha.
1987	Rosiane Maria Silva Lins			Vila dos Remédios		
1986	Angelita da Silva Feijó			Appointed		Originally from Camaquã, Rio Grande do Sul.
1985	Suzanne Albuquerque			Appointed	1st Runner-Up	Previously 1st Runner-Up at Miss Brasília 1985 as Miss Ass. dos Servidores de Brasília and was invited to represent the territory.
1984	Teresa Cristina dos Santos			Vila dos Remédios	Top 12	Won the title against only 7 competitors.
1983	Deborah Proença de Moura			Vila dos Remédios	4th Runner-Up	
1982	Rossana Silva de Oliveira	18	1.75 m (5 ft 9 in)	Appointed		Previously 3rd Runner-Up at Miss Brasília 1982 as Miss Minas Brasília Tênis Clube and was invited to represent the territory.
1974	Angélica Moura Lins			Appointed		Previously 1st Runner-Up at Miss Pernambuco 1974 as Miss Gravatá and was invited to represent the then Territory of Fernando de Noronha.
1969	Adelle Zampieri Paiva			Appointed		Previously 1st Runner-Up at Miss Espírito Santo 1969 as Miss Clube Vitória and originally from Rio de Janeiro, Rio de Janeiro State.
