= Miss Sergipe =

Miss Sergipe Miss Universe Sergipe
- Formation: 1956
- Type: Beauty pageant
- Headquarters: Sergipe, Brazil
- Members: Miss Brazil
- Official language: Portuguese
- State Director: Luiz Plínio

Miss Sergipe is a Brazilian beauty pageant which selects the representative for the State of Sergipe at the Miss Brazil contest. The pageant was created in 1956 and has been held every year since with the exception of 1990–1991 and 1993. The pageant is held annually with representation of several municipalities. Since 2018, the State director for Miss Sergipe is Luiz Plínio. Sergipe still has yet to win any crowns in the national contest.

== Results summary ==
=== Placements ===
- Miss Brazil:
- 1st Runner-Up:
- 2nd Runner-Up: Maria Isabel de Avelar Elias (1964); Anne Carolynne Valença de Jesus (2021)
- 3rd Runner-Up:
- 4th Runner-Up:
- Top 5/Top 7/Top 8/Top 9: Zélia Maria Mendonça Lopes (1963); Saiury Carvalho dos Santos (2017); Gabriela Botelho Campos Serrano (2023)
- Top 10/Top 11/Top 12: Márcia Menezes Mello (1980); Ellen Dutra Fonsêca (1995); Nayane de Souza Pachêco (2010); Lisianny Nascimento Bispo (2013); Anne Carolynne Valença de Jesus (2016)
- Top 15/Top 16: Ingrid Vieira de Moraes (2019); Ingrid Silva Prata (2022)

=== Special awards ===
- Miss Congeniality: Ana Paula Santana (1983); Cleide Jane Teixeira (1994); Patrícia Borges (1996); Juliana Melo Soares Silva (2004); Nayane de Souza Pachêco (2010)
- Miss Photogenic: Maria Isabel de Avelar Elias (1964)
- Best State Costume: Maria Isabel de Avelar Elias (1964)

== Titleholders ==
Year	Name	Age (Note: Ages at the time of the pageant)	Height	Represented	Miss Brazil placement	Notes
Miss Universe Sergipe
2024	Milena Cassiano	26	1.73 m (5 ft 8 in)	Santana do São Francisco		
2023	Gabriela Botelho Campos Serrano	22	1.73 m (5 ft 8 in)	Aracaju	Top 7	Previously Miss Espírito Santo CNB 2021 and 2nd Runner-Up at Miss Brazil CNB 2021.
2022	Ingrid Silva Prata	21	1.75 m (5 ft 9 in)	Salgado	Top 16	
2021	Anne Carolynne Valença de Jesus	27	1.72 m (5 ft 7 1/2 in)	Aracaju	2nd Runner-Up	Previously Miss Sergipe Be Emotion 2016 and Top 10 at Miss Brazil 2016.
U Miss Sergipe 2020 and Miss Sergipe Be Emotion 2020
2020	No national Miss Brazil contest due to the COVID-19 pandemic and change in the national franchise holder which caused the national titleholder to be appointed.					
2020	Caroline Andrade	23	1.68 m (5 ft 6 in)	Propriá	Did not compete	Last Miss Miss Sergipe Be Emotion; No national contest held.
Miss Sergipe Be Emotion
2019	Ingrid Vieira de Moraes	24	1.76 m (5 ft 9 1/2 in)	Barra dos Coqueiros	Top 15	Previously Miss Sergipe Mundo 2013 and competed at Miss Brazil World 2013.
2018	Grazielly Jesus Vieira de Moraes	19	1.74 m (5 ft 8 1/2 in)	Boquim		
2017	Saiury Carvalho dos Santos	24	1.72 m (5 ft 7 1/2 in)	Aracaju	Top 5	2nd Runner-Up at Miss Sergipe 2011.
2016	Anne Carolynne Valença de Jesus	21	1.72 m (5 ft 7 1/2 in)	Aracaju	Top 10	Later crowned Miss Universe Sergipe 2021 and 2nd Runner-Up at Miss Brazil 2021.
2015	Pryscilla Felisberto de Souza	23	1.75 m (5 ft 9 in)	Umbaúba		Band, on behalf of Miss Brazil, voided the results of the original 2015 Miss Sergipe contest and appointed the titleholder that competed in that year's Miss Brazil contest.
2015	Isabelle Mitidieri	19	1.78 m (5 ft 10 in)	Itabaiana	Did not compete	Band, on behalf of Miss Brazil, voided the results of the original 2015 Miss Sergipe contest and appointed the titleholder that competed in that year's Miss Brazil contest.
Miss Sergipe Universe
2014	Priscilla Karla Pinheiro Cardoso	21	1.80 m (5 ft 11 in)	Campo do Brito		3rd Runner-Up at Miss Rio Grande do Norte Universe 2012 and 4th Runner-Up at Miss Rio Grande do Norte Universe 2013.
2013	Lisianny Nascimento Bispo	20	1.77 m (5 ft 9 1/2 in)	Itabaiana	Top 10	
2012	Evlen Yasmim Fontes Sousa	19	1.73 m (5 ft 8 in)	Tobias Barreto		
Miss Sergipe
2011	Danielle Alves Paes Santos			Praia de Aruanã		
2010	Nayane de Souza Pachêco			Praia de Atalaia Nova	Top 10	Also won Miss Congeniality in the pageant.
2009	Luna Clayane Meneses Silva			Ribeirópolis		
2008	Kary Cristina Lima Borges			Estância		
2007	Paloma Vieira de Melo			Nossa Senhora do Socorro		
2006	Aisley Karoline Araújo de Souza			Propriá		
2005	Claudianne Bonfim dos Santos			Nossa Senhora do Socorro		
2004	Juliana Melo Soares Silva			Aracaju		Won Miss Congeniality.
2003	Fabrizia Ramos Santana			Estância		
2002	Ana Carla Dantas Ferreira					
2001	Karina da Costa Barreto					
2000	Josiane Santos Ângelo					
1999	Fernanda Lacerda de Souza					
1998	Stela Maris de Holanda Marinho					
1997	Karla Wivianny Andrade Mendonça					
1996	Patrícia Borges					Won Miss Congeniality.
1995	Ellen Dutra Fonsêca				Top 10	
1994	Cleide Jane Teixeira					Won Miss Congeniality.
1993	No delegate sent in 1993 due to Miss Brazil 1993 being appointed rather than having a contest.					
1992	Raquel Dalla Bernardina					
1991	No delegate sent in 1991.					
1990	No contest in 1990.					
1989	Patrícia Loeser de Carvalho					
1988	Ângela Maria Mendonça Costa					
1987	Fernanda da Silva Costa			Estância		
1986	Rita de Cássia Freire do Amor			Estância		
1985	Laudicéa Aparecida Gildo					
1984	Rita de Cássia Lourenço					
1983	Ana Paula Santana					Won Miss Congeniality.
1982	Marisol Lima Ramos					
1981	Carmen Elisa Marin Pansani					
1980	Márcia Menezes Mello			Propriá	Top 10	
1979	Kátia Maria Ferreira da Costa					
1978	Maria das Graças Santos					
1977	Elizabeth de Souza Silva					
1976	Maria Wilma Prata					
1975	Maria Wilma Santos					
1974	Helenita Santos					
1973	Ivany Apóstolo de Melo					
1972	Jocenyr Monteiro Santos					
1971	Luciene Campos de Oliveira					
1970	Cláudia Toscano de Brito					
1969	Maria Carmen Gentil Barreto					
1968	Leonísia Fonseca Mota					
1967	Noeme Dantas			Associação Atlética de Aracaju	Did not compete	Took over after the original winner resigned in March of 1968.
1967	Maria Hortência Góes			Clube dos Diretores Lojistas		Hortência resigned the title in order to be able to get married.
1966	Lygia Sampaio Fiscina			Associação Atlética da Faculdade de Medicina		
1965	Maria Luiza Vieira da Cruz			Sociedade de Cultura Artística de Sergipe		
1964	Maria Isabel de Avelar Elias	18	1.70 m (5 ft 7 in)	Iate Clube de Aracaju	2nd Runner-Up; Miss Brazil World 1964	Also won Miss Photogenic and Best State Costume at Miss Brazil. 3rd Runner-Up at Miss World 1964.
1963	Zélia Maria Mendonça Lopes			Associação Atlética de Aracaju	Top 8	
1962	Gleide Maria de Freitas					
1961	Elenita Teixeira Lobo			Iate Clube de Aracaju		
1960	Maria Bandeira de Mello Labuto					
1959	Maria Aparecida Guimarães			Grêmio da ASCB		
1958	Maria Nilza de Brito	18		Vasco Esporte Clube		
1957	Maria Helena Morais e Silva			Cotinguiba Esporte Clube		
1956	Graciema Madureira de Melo			Itaporanga d'Ajuda		
1955	No delegate sent in 1954 and 1955 as the contest didn't exist until 1956.					
1954	No delegate sent in 1954 and 1955 as the contest didn't exist until 1956.					
