= Miss Amapá =

Brazilian beauty pageant

Miss Amapá Miss Universe Amapá
- Formation: 1958
- Type: Beauty pageant
- Headquarters: Amapá, Brazil
- Members: Miss Brazil
- Official language: Portuguese
- State Director: Alexandro Pereira

Miss Amapá is a Brazilian beauty pageant which selects the representative for the State of Amapá at the Miss Brazil contest. The pageant was created in 1958 and has been held every year since with the exception of 1961, 1964–1965, 1967–1968, 1970, 1990, 1993, and 2020. The pageant is held annually with representation of several municipalities. Since 2025, the State director of Miss Amapá is Alexandro Pereira. Previously, from 2011 to 2024, it was Enyellen Sales, who is also Miss Amapá 2009. Amapá still has yet to win any crowns in the national contest.

== Results summary ==
=== Placements ===
- Miss Brazil:
- 1st Runner-Up:
- 2nd Runner-Up:
- 3rd Runner-Up:
- 4th Runner-Up:
- Top 5/Top 8/Top 9: Priscila Winny (2014)
- Top 10/Top 11/Top 12: Sandra Ohana (1984); Maria de Oliveira Lopes (1992); Cristiane Valéria Nascimento (1994); Luciana Santos (1999)
- Top 15/Top 16: Alessandra Ohana Nery Barcellos (2023)

=== Special awards ===
- Miss Congeniality: Patrícia Trindade (2006)
- Best State Costume: Carla Helena (2007)

== Titleholders ==
Year	Name	Age (Note: Ages at the time of the pageant)	Height	Represented	Miss Brazil placement	Notes
Miss Universe Amapá
2025	Caroline Calderón Soares	37		Macapá		
2024	Joana Flexa	21		Mazagão		Originally the 1st Runner-Up, but later took over the Miss Universe Amapá 2024 title after the original winner resigned prior to the national pageant.
2024	Lauanda Brito	23	1.81 m (5 ft 11 1/2 in)	Tartarugalzinho	Did not compete	Later resigned from the Miss Universe Amapá 2024 title due to personal reasons.
2023	Alessandra Ohana Nery Barcellos	25	1.68 m (5 ft 6 in)	Macapá	Top 16	
2022	Lycia Maria Ribeiro da Costa	24	1.75 m (5 ft 9 in)	Macapá		
2021	Andreina Nunes Pereira	21	1.71 m (5 ft 7 1/2 in)	Santana		
U Miss Amapá 2020 and Miss Amapá Be Emotion 2020
2020	No national Miss Brazil contest due to the COVID-19 pandemic and change in the national franchise holder which caused the national titleholder to be appointed.					
Miss Amapá Be Emotion
2019	Brenda Gomes Lazareth	22	1.74 m (5 ft 8 1/2 in)	Santana		Last Miss Amapá Be Emotion
2018	Emilay Muniz Campos	20	1.69 m (5 ft 6 1/2 in)	Mazagão		Pereira later resigned the title of Miss Amapá (Be Emotion) 2018 for personal reasons. Muniz was later crowned as the new Miss Amapá (Be Emotion) 2018 and competed in Miss Brazil 2018.
2018	Williene Pereira de Lima	20		Santana	Did not compete	Pereira later resigned the title of Miss Amapá (Be Emotion) 2018 for personal reasons. Muniz was later crowned as the new Miss Amapá (Be Emotion) 2018 and competed in Miss Brazil 2018.
2017	Jéssica Helaine Pachêco	26	1.75 m (5 ft 9 in)	Laranjal do Jari		
2016	Joely Teixeira de Moura	24	1.72 m (5 ft 7 1/2 in)	Macapá		
2015	Daiane Moura Maciel Uchôa	24	1.75 m (5 ft 9 in)	Calçoene		Previously Miss Amapá Mundo 2014 and competed in Miss Brazil World 2014.
Miss Amapá Universe
2014	Priscila Winny de Oliveira	22	1.80 m (5 ft 11 in)	Cutias do Araguari	Top 5	Previously Miss Pará Mundo 2011 and competed at Miss Brazil World 2011.
2013	Nataly de Oliveira Uchôa	19	1.75 m (5 ft 9 in)	Pedra Branca do Amapari		
2012	Vanessa Cristina Pereira	18	1.80 m (5 ft 11 in)	Serra do Navio		
Miss Amapá
2011	Josiene Lima de Jesus Modesto			Pracuúba		
2010	Andréia Caroline da Silva			Mazagão		
2009	Enyellen Campos Sales			Fortaleza de São José de Macapá		
2008	Kamila Katrine Campos Batista			Teatro das Bacabeiras		
2007	Carla Helena Melo Pinto			Ferreira Gomes		Won Best State Costume.
2006	Patrícia Trindade Tavares			Macapá		Won Miss Congeniality.
2005	Monique de Paula Houat			Macapá		
2004	Ellen Paula Coutinho Santana			Macapá		
2003	Adriana Raquel de Moura Xavier	18	1.70 m (5 ft 7 in)	Macapá		
2002	Jorlene Lima de Jesus Modesto			Macapá		
2001	Jakeline Almeida Amanajás			Macapá		
2000	Alessandra Alves Resende					
1999	Luciana Alves dos Santos				Top 10	
1998	Sabrina Leandra Gomes da Silva					
1997	Karolyne Christina Queiroz Leite					
1996	Lalsemi Luiza Silva					
1995	Bruna Bier Grecco					
1994	Cristiane Valéria Nascimento				Top 12	
1993	No delegate sent in 1993 due to Miss Brazil 1993 being appointed rather than having a contest.					
1992	Diva Maria de Oliveira Lopes				Top 12	
1991	No delegate sent in 1991.					
1990	No contest in 1990.					
1989	Kátia Cilene da Rocha Silva					
1988	Fabíola Souza Bordalo					
1987	Vânia Maria Fernandes de Souza					
1986	Jaciara de Souza Coutinho					
1985	Rosângela Maria de Almeida Oliveira					
1984	Sandra Ohana de Lima Nery				Top 12	
1983	Marúcia Monteiro Mendonça					
1982	Maria de Fátima Nunes Diniz			Basa Clube		
1981	Antônia Barbosa Pereira			Basa Clube		
1980	Regina Lúcia Sena de Almeida			Colégio Amapaense		
1979	Márcia Maria Costa de Andrade			Esporte Clube Macapá		
1978	Maria do Perpétuo Socorro Antunes					
1977	Elizabeth Kohler da Cunha			Associação Atlética Banco do Brasil		
1976	Maria Moncherry Alexander			Associação Atlética Banco do Brasil		
1975	Maria Antonieta Ferreira Pires da Costa			Esporte Clube Macapá		
1974	Maria Raimunda Natividade Pombo			Independente Esporte Clube		
1973	Maria de Fátima da Silva Serrano					
1972	Kátia Mara Houat			Círculo Militar de Macapá		
1971	Flora Maria Silva Cardoso					
1970	No delegate sent in 1970.					
1969	Nilza Maria Pontes Macêdo				Withdrew	Only competed in the preliminary round and not the finals.
1968	No delegate sent in 1967 and 1968.					
1967	No delegate sent in 1967 and 1968.					
1966	Rita de Cássia Fernandes	20		Appointed		Rita de Cássia Fernandes was appointed to represent Amapá at Miss Brazil 1966. She was born in Campos dos Goytacazes in Rio de Janeiro and was the 1st Runner-Up at Miss State of Rio 1966.
1965	No delegate sent in 1964 and 1965.					
1964	No delegate sent in 1964 and 1965.					
1963	Thêmis Kohler da Cunha			Saci Esporte Clube		
1962	Raimunda Mendes Pachêco			Santana Esporte Clube		
1961	No delegate sent in 1961.					
1960	Glória Maria Celso Portugal					
1959	Dalva Marinho Monteiro Nunes		1.62 m (5 ft 4 in)	Santana Esporte Clube		
1958	Ilma da Silva Dias			Amapá Clube		
1957	No delegate sent between 1954 and 1957 as the contest didn't exist until 1958.					
1956	No delegate sent between 1954 and 1957 as the contest didn't exist until 1958.					
1955	No delegate sent between 1954 and 1957 as the contest didn't exist until 1958.					
1954	No delegate sent between 1954 and 1957 as the contest didn't exist until 1958.					
