= Miss Alagoas =

Miss Alagoas Miss Universe Alagoas
- Formation: 1955
- Type: Beauty pageant
- Headquarters: Alagoas, Brazil
- Members: Miss Brazil
- Official language: Portuguese
- State Director: Marcio Mattos

Miss Alagoas is a Brazilian Beauty pageant which selects the representative for the State of Alagoas at the Miss Brazil contest. The pageant was created in 1955 and has been held every year since with the exception of 1990–1991, 1993, 2020, and 2022. The pageant is held annually with representation of several municipalities. Since 2025, the State director for Miss Alagoas is Marcio Mattos. Alagoas still has yet to win any crowns in the national contest.

== Results summary ==
=== Placements ===
- Miss Brazil:
- 1st Runner-Up: Gabriele Marinho Barbosa (2024)
- 2nd Runner-Up:
- 3rd Runner-Up: Gabriele Marinho Barbosa (2020)
- 4th Runner-Up:
- Top 5/Top 7/Top 8/Top 9: Gabriele Marinho Barbosa (2016); Isabella Burgui (2018)
- Top 10/Top 11/Top 12: Sandra Lobo Pauferro (1981); Eveline Braga Santos (1983); Tatiani Garcez Brigagão (1995); Fernanda Scorsatto Dorigon (2004); Nathália Pastoura (2017)
- Top 15/Top 16: Ruthy Raphaella (2023)

=== Special awards ===
- Miss Elegance: Bertini Motta (1955)

== Titleholders ==
Year	Name	Age (Note: Ages at the time of the pageant)	Height	Represented	Miss Brazil placement	Notes
Miss Universe Alagoas
2025	Hellyen Fusco	37		Maceió		
2024	Gabriele Marinho Barbosa	30	1.68 m (5 ft 6 in)	Maceió	1st Runner-Up	Previously Miss Alagoas Be Emotion 2016 and U Miss Alagoas 2020. Placed Top 5 at Miss Brazil 2016 and 3rd Alternative/Runner-Up at Miss Brazil 2020.
2023	Ruthy Raphaella	22	1.70 m (5 ft 7 in)	Taquarana	Top 16	Previously Miss Alagoas CNB 2018 and Top 21 at Miss Brazil CNB 2018. Also Miss Grand Alagoas 2020 and 4th Runner-Up at Miss Grand Brazil 2020.
2022	No delegate sent in 2022.					
2021	Rafaela Barbosa	22	1.70 m (5 ft 7 in)	Arapiraca		
U Miss Alagoas 2020 and Miss Alagoas Be Emotion 2020
2020	Gabriele Marinho Barbosa	26	1.69 m (5 ft 6 1/2 in)		3rd Alternative/Runner-Up	Previously Miss Alagoas Be Emotion 2016 and Top 5 at Miss Brazil 2016. No national Miss Brazil contest due to the COVID-19 pandemic and change in the national franchise holder which caused the national titleholder to be appointed.
Miss Alagoas Be Emotion
2019	Raíssa de Souza	21	1.75 m (5 ft 9 in)	Rio Largo		Last Miss Miss Alagoas Be Emotion
2018	Isabella Burgui	24	1.77 m (5 ft 9 1/2 in)	Maceió	Top 5	
2017	Nathália Pastoura	23	1.72 m (5 ft 7 1/2 in)	Santana do Ipanema	Top 10	
2016	Gabriele Marinho Barbosa	22	1.68 m (5 ft 6 in)	Maceió	Top 5	Later became U Miss Alagoas 2020 and 3rd Runner-Up/Alternative at Miss Brazil 2020. Also Miss Universe Alagoas 2024 and 1st Runner-Up at Miss Brazil 2024.
2015	Camila Leão de Lima Campêlo	21	1.74 m (5 ft 8 1/2 in)	Maceió		Previously Miss Alagoas World 2014 and Top 21 at Miss Brazil World 2014.
Miss Alagoas Universe
2014	Aline Karla Ferreira de Macêdo	20	1.75 m (5 ft 9 in)	Arapiraca		
2013	Nicole Camila Verçosa Rosa	20	1.70 m (5 ft 7 in)	Barra de São Miguel		
2012	Marina Dantas Rijo Valoura	18	1.81 m (5 ft 11 1/2 in)	Roteiro		
Miss Alagoas
2011	Stéfanie Marques Carvalho			Piranhas		
2010	Juliana Accioli Guimarães			Faculdade de Maceió		
2009	Ana Carolina Morais			Verdes Mares Distribuidora	Did not compete	Originally the 1st Runner-Up of Miss Alagoas 2009. Assumed after the original winner resigned.
2009	Kamyla Brandão Moura			Viçosa		Resigned the title 8 months after winning it to get married.
2008	Williana Graziella Siqueira			Viçosa		
2007	Camilla Reis Cavalcanti Góis			Agência Styllos		
2006	Tatiane Maria Bezerra Terêncio			Revista Destaque		
2005	Aline Roberta Serafim da Rocha			Verdes Mares Distribuidora		
2004	Fernanda Scorsatto Dorigon				Top 10	
2003	Danielle Nascimento Santos					
2002	Érika Catarina de Amorim					
2001	Aline Canedo Souza					
2000	Simonne Luz Menezes					
1999	Elena Cristina da Silva					
1998	Juliana Tenório Peixoto					
1997	Danyelly Velozo de Melo					
1996	Isabel Cristina Gonçalves					
1995	Tatiani Garcez Brigagão				Top 10	
1994	Adriana Amaral Coelho					
1993	No delegate sent in 1993 due to Miss Brazil 1993 being appointed rather than having a contest.					
1992	Patricia Bani					
1991	No delegate sent in 1991.					
1990	No contest in 1990.					
1989	Karina Padilha Rebelo			Viçosa		
1988	Girleide Costa Campêlo					
1987	Mosaly Rodrigues Brasileiro			Palmeira dos Índios		
1986	Vera Ítala Leão Rêgo Arruda			Palmeira dos Índios		
1985	Viviane Elizabeth Lundgren					
1984	Mônica Márcia Mendonça					
1983	Eveline Braga Santos			Clube Fênix Alagoana	Top 12	
1982	Sílvia Vicente da Silva			Arapiraca		
1981	Sandra Lobo Pauferro			Penedo	Top 12	
1980	Alda Torres Tenório			São Miguel dos Campos		
1979	Walmair Novais Santos			Arapiraca		
1978	Valdelice Pereira Marinho			Associação Atlética Banco do Brasil		
1977	Célia Maria Neto Costa			Jaraguá Tênis Clube		
1976	Ana Cristina Menezes					
1975	Roseana Porto Farias					
1974	Maria de Fátima Silva					
1973	Márcia Andrada Tenório			Casa dos Universitários de Alagoas		
1972	Maria do Rosário Lerner			Penedo		
1971	Ednar César Cerqueira			São Miguel dos Campos		
1970	Maria Líbia Jucá Mafra			Lions Clube de Maceió		
1969	Vera Lúcia Henriques			Rio Largo		
1968	Cláudia Virgínia Martins			Clube de Regatas Brasil		
1967	Maria de Lourdes Barros			Arapiraca		
1966	Kátia da Silva Malta			Iate Clube Pajussara		
1965	Mary Grace Bandeira			Iate Clube Pajussara		
1964	Teresinha Granja			Rio Largo		
1963	Terezinha Binas			União dos Palmares		
1962	Salete Mendonça					
1961	Carmen Mascarenhas			Jaraguá Tênis Clube		
1960	Lunalva Lamenha			Casa dos Universitários de Alagoas		
1959	Lydia Anny Kunnz			Iate Clube Pajussara		
1958	Noélia Cavalcanti			Iate Clube Pajussara		
1957	Rosa Lúcia Pachêco			Associação Atlética Banco do Brasil		
1956	Maria Teresa Mello			Associação Teatral das Alagoas		
1955	Bertini Motta			Clube de Regatas Brasil		Won Miss Elegance in the pageant.
1954	No delegate sent in 1954 as the contest didn't exist until 1955.					
