= Miss Rondônia =

Brazilian beauty pageant

Miss Rondônia Miss Universe Rondônia
- Formation: 1964
- Type: Beauty pageant
- Headquarters: Rondônia, Brazil
- Members: Miss Brazil
- Official language: Portuguese
- State Director: Eletícia Dias

Miss Rondônia is a Brazilian Beauty pageant which selects the representative for the State of Rondônia at the Miss Brazil contest. The pageant was created in 1964 and has been held every year since with the exception of 1954–1963, 1969, 1977–1978, 1990, 1991, 1993, and 2020. The pageant is held annually with representation of several municipalities. Since 2023, the State Director of Miss Rondônia is Eletícia Dias. Rondônia still has yet to win any crowns in the national contest

== Results summary ==
=== Placements ===
- Miss Brazil:
- 1st Runner-Up: Adriana Reis (1998)
- 2nd Runner-Up:
- 3rd Runner-Up: Úrsula Mendes (1997)
- 4th Runner-Up:
- Top 5/Top 8/Top 9: Ana Maria Façanha Gaspar (1966)
- Top 10/Top 11/Top 12: Marisa Marin Delgado (1989); Luana Najara Athar (2004); Iaisa Helena Ribeiro (2007)
- Top 15/Top 16:

=== Special awards ===
- Miss Congeniality: Zoracy Parra Motta (1971); Yete de Fátima Baleeiro (1979); Sinaira Machado Souza (2014)
- Best State Costume:

== Titleholders ==
Year	Name	Age (Note: Ages at the time of the pageant)	Height	Represented	Miss Brazil placement	Notes
Miss Universe Rondônia
2023	Vitória Ribeiro de Brito	19	1.70 m (5 ft 7 in)	Vilhena		
2022	Kamila Carolina da Costa Coelho	22	1.70 m (5 ft 7 in)	Vilhena		
2021	Thaisi Dias Pinto	24	1.65 m (5 ft 5 in)	Porto Velho		First person to be crowned Miss Rondônia twice. Previously Miss Rondônia Be Emotion 2018.
U Miss Rondônia 2020 and Miss Rondônia Be Emotion 2020
2020	No national Miss Brazil contest due to the COVID-19 pandemic and change in the national franchise holder which caused the national titleholder to be appointed.					
Miss Rondônia Be Emotion
2019	Hunaide Horitham	23	1.68 m (5 ft 6 in)	Ji-Paraná		Last Miss Rondônia Be Emotion
2018	Thaisi Dias Pinto	20	1.65 m (5 ft 5 in)	Porto Velho		Later crowned Miss Universe Rondônia 2021.
2017	Maria Clara Vicco	18	1.73 m (5 ft 8 in)	Porto Velho		
2016	Mariana Theol Denny	19	1.75 m (5 ft 9 in)	Ji-Paraná		
2015	Gabriela Fernandes Rossi	21	1.70 m (5 ft 7 in)	Porto Velho		
Miss Rondônia Universe
2014	Sinaira Machado Souza	24	1.74 m (5 ft 8 1/2 in)	Porto Velho		Won Miss Congeniality (Miss Simpatia).
2013	Jeane Ferreira de Aguiar	24	1.77 m (5 ft 9 1/2 in)	Ji-Paraná		
2012	Michele Aparecida Miquelini	21	1.75 m (5 ft 9 in)	Ariquemes		
Miss Rondônia
2011	Aline Mendes Cabral			Ji-Paraná		Took over after the original winner resigned.
2011	Cynthia Castro			Porto Velho	Did not compete	Resigned due to being underage.
2010	Jeane Ferreira de Aguiar			Ji-Paraná		
2009	Lorena Garcia Mendonça			Porto Velho		
2008	Maíra Mallmann Lima			Porto Velho		
2007	Iaisa Helena Ribeiro			Porto Velho	Top 10	
2006	Suzana Cavalcante			Porto Velho		
2005	Fabiana Cortez			Rolim de Moura		
2004	Luana Najara Athar			Porto Velho	Top 10	
2003	Cláudia Roberta Boschilia					Cláudia Roberta Boschilia was born in São Carlos, São Paulo. She was invited to represent the state in that year's national pageant.
2002	Renata Andresia Medeiros					Renata Andresia Moya Medeiros is a native of Iporã, Paraná and now resides in Argentina. She was invited to represent the state.
2001	Jacqueline Aparecida Brito					
2000	Ana Paula Michie Nakano					
1999	Priscila Giacomolli			Espigão d'Oeste		
1998	Adriana Luci de Souza Reis				1st Runner-Up; Miss Brazil World 1998	Adriana Luci de Souza Reis was one of the finalists of Miss Minas Gerais that year and was appointed to represent the state. Top 10 at Miss World 1998.
1997	Úrsula da Conceição Mendes				3rd Runner-Up	Úrsula da Conceição Mendes was one of the finalists of Miss Minas Gerais that year and was invited to represent Rondônia.
1996	Cleonice Silveira					
1995	Cristiane Bielinki Lopes					
1994	Ana Karina Lopes Costa					
1993	No delegate sent in 1993 due to Miss Brazil 1993 being appointed rather than having a contest.					
1992	Sandra Cristina de Oliveira					
1991	No delegate sent in 1991.					
1990	No contest in 1990.					
1989	Marisa Marin Delgado			Cacoal	Top 12	
1988	Sandra Rodrigues Jorge			Rolim de Moura		
1987	Márcia Aparecida de Sá			Vilhena		
1986	Sheila Dorothy Miranda			Porto Velho		
1985	Soraya Sirbela Tavares			Ji-Paraná		
1984	Josélia Viriato Barros			Guajará-Mirim		
1983	Gilda Maria de Morais			Associação Atlética Banco do Brasil		
1982	Marilú de Lurdes Wobeto			Vilhena		
1981	Carmen Eliane de Blafert			Ariquemes		
1980	Maria de Nazaré Centeno			Ypiranga Esporte Clube		
1979	Yete de Fátima Baleeiro			Moto Esporte Clube		
1978	No delegate sent in 1977 & 1978.					
1977	No delegate sent in 1977 & 1978.					
1976	Maria Regina Furtak			Esporte Clube Vera Cruz		
1975	Ruth Helena Pereira			Jornal Alto Madeira		Ruth Helena Pereira was nominated by Jornal Alto Madeira de Rondônia, associated with newspapers and broadcasters, to represent the State.
1974	Cleonice de Oliveira					
1973	Eugênia Suriadakis			Guajará-Mirim		
1972	Kátia Fernanda Oliveira			Bancrévea Clube		
1971	Zoracy Parra Motta			Ferroviário Atlético Clube		
1970	Elizabeth Augis					Elizabeth Augis was nominated by the national organization of Miss Brazil to represent the Rondônia that year.
1969	Nadja Naira da Fonsêca				Withdrew	Nadja Naira da Fonsêca was originally crowned as Miss Rondônia but later dropped out of Miss Brazil and there was no replacement for her. She competed at Miss Guanabara 1969 representing the "Várzea Country Clube" and placed as 2nd Runner-Up.
1968	Sueli Marisa Corrêa					Sueli Marisa Corrêa competed for the title of Miss Guanabara 1968 representing the "Tijuca Tennis Club". She was invited to represent the then territory of Rondônia.
1967	Nádia Solange Garios					Nadia competed for the title of Miss Estado do Rio 1967. She was initially invited to be crowned Miss Roraima, but there were last minute changes and she ended up being crowned Miss Rondônia.
1966	Ana Maria Façanha Gaspar				Top 8	Ana Maria competed for the title of Miss Estado do Rio 1966 representing Niterói, finished in 3rd Runner-Up. She was later on invited to represent Rondônia.
1965	Aurian Fátima Gomes Chaves					Aurian Fátima Gomes Chaves competed in Miss Amazonas 1965 representing the store "Anjo Azul" and placed as "2nd Runner-Up". She received the title in Porto Velho by José Manuel Luís da Cunha Meneses, the then Governor of the then territory.
1964	Sônia Regina de Magalhães					Sonia Regina Azevêdo de Magalhães competed at Miss Guanabara 1964 sashed as the "Grêmio Recreativo do Sindicato dos Bancários" and was later invited to represent the then territory.
1963	No delegate sent between 1954 and 1963 as the contest didn't exist until 1964.					
1962	No delegate sent between 1954 and 1963 as the contest didn't exist until 1964.					
1961	No delegate sent between 1954 and 1963 as the contest didn't exist until 1964.					
1960	No delegate sent between 1954 and 1963 as the contest didn't exist until 1964.					
1959	No delegate sent between 1954 and 1963 as the contest didn't exist until 1964.					
1958	No delegate sent between 1954 and 1963 as the contest didn't exist until 1964.					
1957	No delegate sent between 1954 and 1963 as the contest didn't exist until 1964.					
1956	No delegate sent between 1954 and 1963 as the contest didn't exist until 1964.					
1955	No delegate sent between 1954 and 1963 as the contest didn't exist until 1964.					
1954	No delegate sent between 1954 and 1963 as the contest didn't exist until 1964.					
