= Miss Maranhão =

Miss Maranhão Miss Universe Maranhão
- Formation: 1955
- Type: Beauty pageant
- Headquarters: Maranhão, Brazil
- Members: Miss Brazil
- Official language: Portuguese
- State Director: Dominique Silva

Miss Maranhão is a Brazilian Beauty pageant which selects the representative for the State of Maranhão at the Miss Brazil contest. The pageant was created in 1955 and has been held every year since with the exception of 1990-1991, 1993, and 2020. The pageant is held annually with representation of several municipalities. Since 2022, the State director of Miss Maranhão is, Dominique Silva. Maranhão still has yet to win a crown in the national contest.

== Results summary ==
=== Placements ===
- Miss Brazil:
- 1st Runner-Up:
- 2nd Runner-Up: Mical Pinheiro Pacheco (1997); Deise D'anne de Sousa (2016)
- 3rd Runner-Up:
- 4th Runner-Up:
- Top 5/Top 8/Top 9:
- Top 10/Top 11/Top 12: Thatiana Soares Rodrigues (1985); Larissa Pires de Faria (2014); Isadora Amorim Tobias (2015); Ana Beatriz Nazareno (2017); Natália Seipel Nikolić (2022)
- Top 15/Top 16: Roberta Ribeiro Tavares (2008)

=== Special awards ===
- Miss Congeniality:
- Miss Be Emotion:
- Miss Popular Vote:
- Best State Costume:

== Titleholders ==
Year	Name	Age (Note: Ages at the time of the pageant)	Height	Represented	Miss Brazil placement	Notes
Miss Universe Maranhão
2025	Nagiely Almeida dos Santos	26		Buriticupu		Competed in Miss Maranhão Be Emotion 2019.
2024	Ane Caroline Diniz	27	1.76 m (5 ft 9 1/2 in)	Caxias		
2023	Lorena Caroline Maia e Silva	27	1.70 m (5 ft 7 in)	São Luís		
2022	Natália Seipel Nikolić	24	1.78 m (5 ft 10 in)	São José de Ribamar	Top 10	
2021	Juliana da Costa Santos	27	1.78 m (5 ft 10 in)	Presidente Dutra		
U Miss Maranhão 2020 and Miss Maranhão Be Emotion 2020
2020	No national Miss Brazil contest due to the COVID-19 pandemic and change in the national franchise holder which caused the national titleholder to be appointed.					
Miss Maranhão Be Emotion
2019	Anna Carolina Sousa	21	1.75 m (5 ft 9 in)	Itapecuru-Mirim		1st Runner-Up at Miss Maranhão Be Emotion 2017; Last Miss Miss Maranhão Be Emotion
2018	Lorena da Silva Bessani	25	1.69 m (5 ft 6 1/2 in)	Barreirinhas		
2017	Ana Beatriz Nazareno	20	1.73 m (5 ft 8 in)	Mata Roma	Top 10	
2016	Deise D'anne de Sousa	26	1.72 m (5 ft 7 1/2 in)	Santo Amaro (do Maranhão)	2nd Runner-Up	
2015	Isadora Amorim Tobias	24	1.74 m (5 ft 8 1/2 in)	Imperatriz	Top 10	
Miss Maranhão Universe
2014	Larissa Pires de Faria	21	1.78 m (5 ft 10 in)	Balsas	Top 10	
2013	Ingrid Gonçalves	22	1.80 m (5 ft 11 in)	Caxias		
2012	Juliana Cavalcante	21	1.75 m (5 ft 9 in)	São Luís		
Miss Maranhão
2011	Nayanne Silva Ferres			São Luís		
2010	Camila da Silva Ribeiro			São Luís		
2009	Thaís dos Santos Portela			São Luís		Assumed the title after the original winner was dethroned.
2009	Louisse Freire da Silva			Imperatriz	Did not compete	Dethroned
2008	Roberta Ribeiro Tavares	18		São Luís	Top 15	
2007	Maiara Rose Cunha Bentivi	19		São Luís		
2006	Aislanny Silva de Medeiros			São Luís		
2005	Telécia Silva Neves de Souza			São Luís		
2004	Lara Polyane Furtado Cunha			Chapadinha		
2003	Kátia Corrêa de Oliveira					
2002	Regiane Farah Borralho					
2001	Zoraide Campos					
2000	Sabrina de Freitas Teixeira					
1999	Amélia Cristina Araújo Ferreira					
1998	Adriana Limeira dos Santos					
1997	Mical Pinheiro Pacheco				2nd Runner-Up	
1996	Carla Diniz					
1995	Catiúscia Rodrigues					
1994	Taís Priscila Rodrigues					
1993	Ingrid Rocha Gomes					
1992	Virna Maria Fecury Zenni			São Luís		
1991	No delegate sent in 1991.					
1990	No contest in 1990.					
1989	Cíntia Itapary Albuquerque			Barra do Corda		
1988	Alessandra Cunha Lima			Imperatriz		
1987	Viviana Vitória Teixeira			São Luís		
1986	Roberta Marão Félix			São Luís		
1985	Thatiana Soares Rodrigues			São Luís	Top 12	
1984	Edna Pereira Mazoro			Grêmio Recreativo Lítero Português		
1983	Silvia Leão Fiquene Couto			Grêmio Recreativo Lítero Português		
1982	Marly Bezerra de Carvalho			Grêmio Recreativo Lítero Português		
1981	Flávia Geórgia Ericeia Pereira			Clube Recreativo Jaguarema		
1980	Rosicleuda Carvalho			Bacabal		
1979	Marilene Gomes Borges			Açailândia		
1978	Nazaré Bezerra Carvalho			Grêmio Recreativo Lítero Português		
1977	Tereza Francisca Barros Torres			Caxias		
1976	Ana Teresa Rodrigues de Abreu			Grêmio Recreativo Lítero Português		
1975	Themis Quintanilha Gerudes			Grêmio Recreativo Lítero Português		
1974	Miracy de Jesus Andrade			São Luís		
1973	Ana Maria Freire de Souza			São Luís		
1972	Fátima Eliane da Silva			Imperatriz		
1971	Maria do Socorro Ribeiro Pinto			APLUB · Sociedade Feminina Sírio-Libanesa		
1970	Mulad Alves Garrido			Casino Maranhense		
1969	Rosa Maria Tavares da Costa			Casino Maranhense		
1968	Vilma das Graças Castro Sales			Programa de Rádio Educadora em Sociedade		
1967	Rosimar Silva Guimarães			Grêmio Recreativo Lítero Português		
1966	Sandra Mara de Arruda Tavares			Jornal Pequeno		
1965	Sônia Maria Malta Mendes			Clube Bancrévea		
1964	Maria Tereza Boblitz			Centro de Veraneio Alvorada		
1963	Ester Ewerton Santos			Casino Maranhense		
1962	Maria Augusta Aguiar Salmen			Casino Maranhense		
1961	Sônia Maria de Souza Duailibe			Grêmio Recreativo Lítero Português		
1960	Merle Aguiar Salmen			Grêmio Recreativo Lítero Português		
1959	Lenita da Conceição Gomes			Casino Maranhense		
1958	Ida do Brasil Valente			UMES - União dos Estudantes Secundaristas		Assumed the title after the original winner was dethroned.
1958	Maria Alice Serra de Castro			Grêmio Lítero Recreativo Português	Did not compete	Dethroned after it was revealed that she was underage.
1957	Malvina Maria de Melo e Alvim			Associação Espírita Milionários		
1956	Maria Alice Castelo Cordeiro			Caxias		
1955	Simei Ribeiro Bílio			Casino Maranhense		
1954	No delegate sent in 1954 as the contest didn't exist until 1955.					
