= Miss Brazil 2024 =

70th Miss Brazil competition, national beauty pageant edition

- Date: September 19, 2024
- Presenters: Julia Gama
- Entertainment: Wanessa Camargo
- Venue: Teatro Gamaro, São Paulo, Brazil
- Entrants: 27
- Placements: 13
- Winner: Luana Cavalcante; Pernambuco

Miss Brazil 2024 (Portuguese: Miss Brasil 2024), officially Miss Universe Brazil 2024 (Portuguese: Miss Universo Brasil 2024) was the 70th edition of the Miss Brazil pageant, held at the Teatro Gamaro in São Paulo, Brazil, on September 19, 2024. It was the inaugural edition under the new directorial management of Gerson Antonelli, who obtained the national franchise in 2024.

At the end of the event, Luana Cavalcante of Pernambuco was crowned Miss Brazil 2024, becoming the first woman from her state and the first mother to win the title. Cavalcante represented Brazil at the Miss Universe 2024 pageant, held in Mexico last November 16 but ended up being unplaced for the fourth consecutive time during the final competition.

== Results ==
=== Placements ===
| Placement | Contestant |
|---|---|
| Miss Brazil 2024 | Pernambuco – Luana Cavalcante |
| 1st Runner-Up | Alagoas – Gabriele Marinho |
| 2nd Runner-Up | Rio de Janeiro – Maria Fabiana Mata |
| Top 7 | Espírito Santo – Letícia Galvão; Minas Gerais – Tatiana Gonçalves; Paraná – Taynara Gargantini; Rio Grande do Sul – Eduarda Dallagnol |
| Top 13 | Acre – Laryssa Costa; Distrito Federal – Suamy Goulart; Goiás – Lara Borges; Pará – Kissia Oliveira; Rio Grande do Norte – Rita Leão; São Paulo – Milla Vieira |

== Contestants ==
Twenty-seven contestants competed for the title.

| State | Contestant | Age (Note: Ages at the time of the pageant) | Hometown |
|---|---|---|---|
| (Acre (state)) Acre | Laryssa Costa | 30 | Rio Branco |
| Alagoas | Gabriele Marinho | 30 | Maceió |
| Amapá | Joana Flexa | 21 | Mazagão |
| (Amazonas (Brazilian state)) Amazonas | Ana Sarah Barreto | 22 | Caapiranga |
| Bahia | Daniela Ataides | — | Urandi |
| Ceará | Kellen Alves | 30 | Fortaleza |
| (Federal District (Brazil)) Distrito Federal | Suamy Goulart | 32 | Brasília |
| Espírito Santo | Letícia Galvão | 25 | Guarapari |
| Goiás | Lara Borges | 29 | Corumbaíba |
| Maranhão | Ane Caroline Diniz | 27 | Caxias |
| Mato Grosso | Calita Franciele | 23 | Campinápolis |
| Mato Grosso do Sul | Lulu Oliveira | 41 | Juruaia |
| Minas Gerais | Tatiana Gonçalves | 26 | Patos de Minas |
| Pará | Kissia Oliveira | 35 | Ananindeua |
| Paraíba | Ana Kezya Alves | 33 | João Pessoa |
| (Paraná (state)) Paraná | Taynara Gargantini | 34 | Paranavaí |
| Pernambuco | Luana Cavalcante | 25 | Recife |
| Piauí | Gabriela Pessoa | 19 | Teresina |
| (Rio de Janeiro (state)) Rio de Janeiro | Maria Fabiana Mata | 25 | Rio de Janeiro |
| Rio Grande do Norte | Rita Leão | 26 | Praia de Pipa |
| Rio Grande do Sul | Eduarda Dallagnol | 25 | Novo Hamburgo |
| Rondônia | Renata Dantas | 37 | Porto Velho |
| Roraima | Karol Falcão | 24 | Amajari |
| (Santa Catarina (state)) Santa Catarina | Carolina Schüler | 32 | Itapema |
| (São Paulo (state)) São Paulo | Milla Vieira | 33 | São Bernardo do Campo |
| Sergipe | Milena Cassiano | 26 | Santana do São Francisco |
| Tocantins | Jackeline Balestra | 29 | Gurupi |
