= Miss Goiás =

Beauty pageant

Miss Goiás Miss Universe Goiás
- Formation: 1954
- Type: Beauty pageant
- Headquarters: Goiás, Brazil
- Members: Miss Brazil
- Official language: Portuguese
- State Director: Périclis Nunes

Miss Goiás is a Brazilian Beauty pageant which selects the representative for the State of Goiás at the Miss Brazil contest. The pageant was created in 1954 and has been held every year since with the exception of 1990 and 1993. The pageant is held annually with representation of several municipalities. Since 2024, the State director of Miss Goiás is, Périclis Nunes. Goiás still has yet to win a Miss Brazil national crown.

== Gallery of Titleholders ==
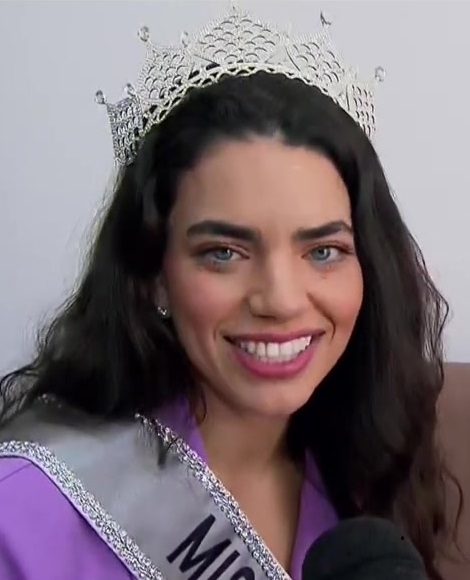
Miss Goiás 2023
Renata Guerra Otoni de Abreu

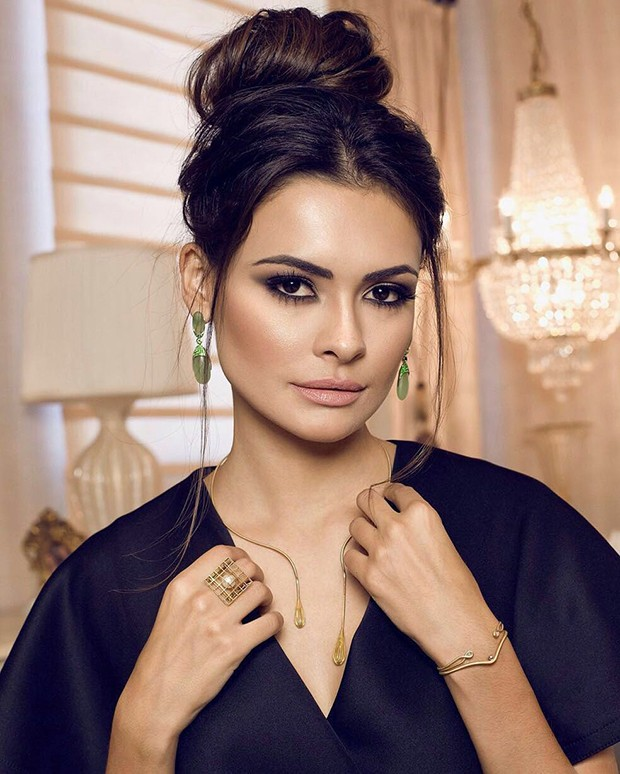
Miss Goiás 2014
Beatrice Bezerra da Fontoura

== Results summary ==
=== Placements ===
- Miss Brazil:
- 1st Runner-Up: Suzane Ferreira de Andrade (1979); Ana Amélia Carneiro (1987); Lara Andressa de Brito (2003)
- 2nd Runner-Up: Nara Rúbia Vieira Monteiro (1970); Cynthia Cordeiro e Souza (2008)
- 3rd Runner-Up: Marlene de Oliveira Prates (1971); Selva Rios Campêllo (1977); Sylvia Beatriz Pires Deja (1989)
- 4th Runner-Up:
- Top 5/Top 7/Top 8: Rosa Pereira de Lima (1974); Maria de Fátima Borges (1975); Beatrice Bezerra da Fontoura (2014); Renata Guerra Otoni de Abreu (2023)
- Top 10/Top 11/Top 12/Top 13: Melissandra Silésia Volpon (1978); Zélia Gonçalves Ribeiro (1980); Cristiane Lisita Passos (1981); Marlene Curado Carvalho (1982); Jacqueline Marie Campos (1983); Cristiane Corrales Ferreira (1988); Karina Paula Marin (1995); Ana Paula Bongers (1998); Jelly Silva da Silveira (2000); Michelly Prado Borges (2001); Luana de Oliveira Chaves (2002); Thaynara Fernandes (2015); Mônica Priscila França (2016); Giovanna Veríssimo (2018); Lara Borges (2024)
- Top 15/Top 16: Liandra Andrade Schmidt (2007); Anielly Campos Barros (2009); Jeovanca Nascimento (2017)

=== Special awards ===
- Miss Photogenic: Michelly Prado Borges (2001)
- Miss Congeniality: Maria Ada da Cunha (1968); Thays Bitencourt (1999)
- Miss Elegance: Karina Paula Marin (1995)
- Miss Be Emotion: Giovanna Veríssimo (2018)
- Miss Smile/Best Smile: Sivone Ramos Soares (1985)
- Best State Costume: Sileimã Alves Pinheiro (2013)

== Titleholders ==
Year	Name	Age (Note: Ages at the time of the pageant)	Height	Represented	Miss Brazil placement	Notes
Miss Universe Goiás
2026	Diovana Borges Camargo	20	1.70 m (5 ft 7 in)	Uruaçu	TBD	
2025	Thaynara Fernandes Silva	31	1.82 m (5 ft 11 1/2 in)	Anápolis		Previously Miss Goiás Be Emotion 2015 and Top 10 at Miss Brazil 2015.
2024	Lara Borges	29	1.70 m (5 ft 7 in)	Corumbaíba	Top 13	
2023	Renata Guerra Otoni de Abreu	27	1.78 m (5 ft 10 in)	Alto Paraíso de Goiás	Top 7	
2022	Camilla Mariana Gomide Reis	25	1.74 m (5 ft 8 1/2 in)	Anápolis		Top 4 at Miss Universe Goiás 2021.
2021	Elisandra Nunes Sucupira	22	1.73 m (5 ft 8 in)	Caldas Novas		
U Miss Goiás 2020 and Miss Goiás Be Emotion 2020
2020	Lorena Campos	19	1.70 m (5 ft 7 in)	Goianápolis	Did not compete	No national Miss Brazil contest due to the COVID-19 pandemic and change in the national franchise holder which caused the national titleholder to be appointed. Last Miss Miss Goiás Be Emotion
Miss Goiás Be Emotion
2019	Isadora Dantas	22	1.73 m (5 ft 8 in)	Aparecida de Goiânia		
2018	Giovanna Veríssimo	23	1.73 m (5 ft 8 in)	Goiânia	Top 10	Also won Miss Be Emotion.
2017	Jeovanca Nascimento	26	1.74 m (5 ft 8 1/2 in)	Pirenópolis	Top 16	
2016	Mônica Priscila França	21	1.72 m (5 ft 7 1/2 in)	Anápolis	Top 10	
2015	Thaynara Fernandes	22	1.82 m (5 ft 11 1/2 in)	Anápolis	Top 10	Later became Miss Universe Goiás 2025 and competed at Miss Brazil 2025.
Miss Goiás Universe
2014	Beatrice Bezerra da Fontoura	24	1.79 m (5 ft 10 1/2 in)	Goiânia	Top 5	Later Miss Goiás CNB 2016 and later won Miss Brazil World 2016. Competed at Miss World 2016 where she placed in the Top 11.
2013	Sileimã Alves Pinheiro	25	1.80 m (5 ft 11 in)	Aruanã		Won Best State Costume. Previously Miss Goiás 2006 and competed in Miss Brazil 2006.
2012	Hérika Noleto Piscinini	24	1.79 m (5 ft 10 1/2 in)	Porangatu		
Miss Goiás
2011	Wiviany Ferreira de Oliveira	24	1.75 m (5 ft 9 in)	Goianira		
2010	Dieniffer Ferreira da Costa	18		Pirenópolis		
2009	Anielly Campos Barros	18		Rio Verde	Top 15	
2008	Cynthia Cordeiro e Souza			Goiânia	2nd Runner-Up	
2007	Liandra Andrade Schmidt			Rio Verde	Top 15	
2006	Sileimã Alves Pinheiro	18	1.80 m (5 ft 11 in)	Goiânia		Later crowned Miss Goiás Universe 2013 and won Best State Costume at Miss Brazil 2013.
2005	Nevilla Veloso Palmieri			Trindade		
2004	Jane de Souza Borges Oliveira	20	1.80 m (5 ft 11 in)	Goiânia		Later Miss Goiânia Mundo 2006 and Miss Brazil World 2006. Represented Brazil at Miss World 2006, where she placed in the Top 6.
2003	Lara Andressa de Brito	24		Goiânia	1st Runner-Up; Miss Brazil World 2003	Competed at Miss World 2003. Previously Miss Goiás Mundo 2001 and 2nd Runner-Up at Miss Brazil World 2001.
2002	Luana de Oliveira Chaves				Top 10	
2001	Michelly Prado Borges				Top 10	Also won Miss Photogenic.
2000	Jelly Silva da Silveira			Anápolis	Top 11	
1999	Thays Bitencourt					Won Miss Congeniality.
1998	Ana Paula Bongers				Top 12	
1997	Fernanda Roriz Goulart					
1996	Karolina de Souza					
1995	Karina Paula Marin				Top 10	Also won Miss Elegance.
1994	Camila Lordello de Melo					
1993	No delegate sent in 1993 due to Miss Brazil 1993 being appointed rather than having a contest.					
1992	Giovanka Silveira Barros			Goianésia		
1991	Heliene Barsanulfo Borba			Goiânia		
1990	No contest in 1990.					
1989	Sylvia Beatriz Pires Deja				3rd Runner-Up	
1988	Cristiane Corrales Ferreira				Top 12	
1987	Ana Amélia Carneiro				1st Runner-Up	
1986	Sálua Cheik			Acreúna		
1985	Sivone Ramos Soares					Won Miss Smile/Best Smile.
1984	Márcia do Socorro Simões					
1983	Jacqueline Marie Campos			Goiânia	Top 12	
1982	Marlene Curado Carvalho			Jóquei Clube de Goiás	Top 12	
1981	Cristiane Lisita Passos			Country Clube de Caldas Novas	Top 12	
1980	Zélia Gonçalves Ribeiro				Top 10	
1979	Suzane Ferreira de Andrade				1st Runner-Up; Miss Brazil International 1979	Competed at Miss International 1979.
1978	Melissandra Silésia Volpon			Goianésia	Top 10	
1977	Selva Rios Campêllo			Goiânia	3rd Runner-Up	
1976	Dilma Rodrigues Ribeiro					
1975	Maria de Fátima Borges				Top 8	
1974	Rosa Pereira de Lima			Universidade Federal de Goiás	Top 8	
1973	Sandra Barros de Paiva			Vila Nova Futebol Clube		
1972	Maria Tereza de Azevedo			Goiânia		
1971	Marlene de Oliveira Prates			Anápolis	3rd Runner-Up	
1970	Nara Rúbia Vieira Monteiro			Goiânia	2nd Runner-Up; Miss Brazil International 1970	Was originally supposed to compete at Miss International 1970 but withdrew.
1969	Elza Maria de Souza			Itumbiara		
1968	Maria Ada da Cunha			Goiânia		Won Miss Congeniality.
1967	Mary Pinto Borba			Goiânia		
1966	Niolina Martins Pachêco	19	1.66 m (5 ft 5 1/2 in)	Goiânia		
1965	Maria Aparecida Silva			Goiânia		
1964	Eny Camilo Machado			Hidrolândia		
1963	Solange Brockes Tayer			Pirenópolis		
1962	Dilma Dias Duarte			Piracanjuba		
1961	Mires Cruz de Abreu	18	1.66 m (5 ft 5 1/2 in)	Clube dos Universitários de Goiânia		
1960	Iara Aparecida Moreira			Clube dos Universitários de Goiânia		
1959	Norma Freire de Carvalho			Anápolis		
1958	Magda Renate Pereira Pfrimer	19	1.71 m (5 ft 7 1/2 in)	Anápolis		Later crowned Miss Brasília 1960 and 1st Runner-Up at Miss Brazil 1960.
1957	Martha Leão Pinkowska			Rio Verde		
1956	Maria Cristina Otaviano			Club Recreativo Anápolis		
1955	Adelly Vieira da Silva			Anápolis		
1954	Dorama Cury Nasser	21		Pires do Rio		
