= Miss Distrito Federal =

Brazilian beauty pageant

Miss Distrito Federal Miss Universe Distrito Federal
- Formation: 1959
- Type: Beauty pageant
- Headquarters: Federal District, Brazil
- Members: Miss Brazil
- Official language: Portuguese
- State Director: Mayck Carvalho

Miss Distrito Federal, formerly called Miss Brasília, is a Brazilian Beauty pageant which selects the representative for the Brazilian Federal District at the Miss Brazil contest. The pageant was created in 1959 and has been held every year since with the exception of 1990–1991, 1993, and 2020. The pageant is held annually with representation of several municipalities. Since 2019, the State director of Miss Distrito Federal is, Mayck Carvalho.

Miss Distrito Federal has only one Miss Brazil national crown:

- Jacqueline Ribeiro Meirelles, in 1987

== Gallery of Titleholders ==
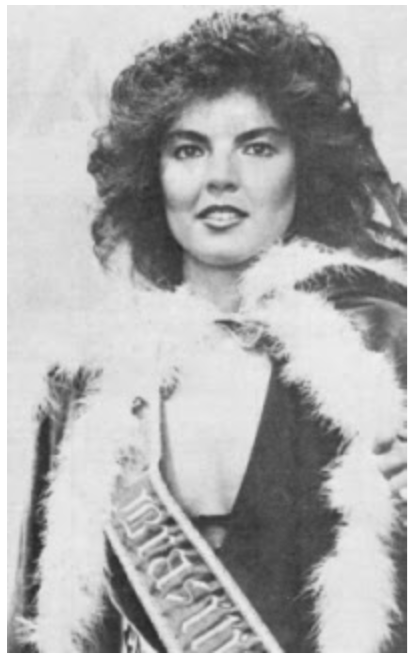
Miss Brasília 1983
Carla Pompeu de Miranda

== Results summary ==
=== Placements ===
- Miss Brazil: Jacqueline Ribeiro Meirelles (1987)
- 1st Runner-Up: Magda Renate Pereira Pfrimer (1960); Lisane Távora (1975)
- 2nd Runner-Up: Mariza Sommer (1974); Adelaide Fraga de Oliveira Filha (1976); Patrícia Viotti de Andrade (1977); Loiane Rogéria Aiache (1980); Karin Keller Lins (1981); Denise Ribeiro Aliceral (2009)
- 3rd Runner-Up: Denise Almeida (1963); Anísia Fonsêca (1967); Tanara Bier (1978); Lidiane de Lucena Matos (2010)
- 4th Runner-Up:
- Top 5/Top 8/Top 9: Pilar Matos Ferro (1968); Marice Galvão (1969); Stella Dlugolenski (1971); Kátia Lopes (1973); Niriam Massi (1979); Tamiris Rodrigues Aguiar (2012)
- Top 10/Top 11/Top 12/Top 13: Lígia Romagnoli (1982); Vera Lúcia Petit (1984); Helayne Cardoso (1985); Patrícia Carneiro (1986); Barbara Kelly Cezar Fonseca (1999); Ana Cláudia Sandoval Pimenta (2006); Alessandra Gomes Faria Baldini (2011); Luísa Lopes (2014); Suamy Goulart (2024)
- Top 15/Top 16: Ludmylla Costa Basthos (2008); Amanda Balbino (2015); Biah Rodrigues (2018); Ana Gabriela Borges (2019); Gabriela Rodrigues (2021); Thayná Souza de Lima (2023)

=== Special awards ===
- Miss Congeniality: Patrícia Viotti de Andrade (1977); Loiane Rogéria Aiache (1980)
- Miss Be Emotion: Amanda Balbino (2015)
- Miss Popular Vote: Ana Cláudia Sandoval Pimenta (2006)
- Best State Costume: Niriam Massi (1979); Ludmylla Costa Basthos (2008)

== Titleholders ==
=== Miss Distrito Federal ===
Since 2002, the pageant title has been Miss Distrito Federal.

Year	Name	Age (Note: Ages at the time of the pageant)	Height	Represented	Miss Brazil placement	Notes
Miss Universe Distrito Federal
2025	No delegate sent in 2025.					
2024	Suamy Goulart	32	1.67 m (5 ft 5 1/2 in)	Asa Norte	Top 13	
2023	Thayná Souza de Lima	27	1.75 m (5 ft 9 in)	Setor Noroeste	Top 16	Previously Miss Supranational Brazil 2017 and Top 25 at Miss Supranational 2017.
2022	Marina "Nina" Assis	25	1.77 m (5 ft 9 1/2 in)	Taguatinga		1st Runner-Up at Miss Brasília CNB 2022.
2021	Gabriela Rodrigues	24	1.74 m (5 ft 8 1/2 in)	Águas Claras	Top 15	
U Miss Distrito Federal 2020 and Miss Distrito Federal Be Emotion 2020
2020	No national Miss Brazil contest due to the COVID-19 pandemic and change in the national franchise holder which caused the national titleholder to be appointed.					
Miss Distrito Federal Be Emotion
2019	Ana Gabriela Borges	21	1.75 m (5 ft 9 in)	Sudoeste/Octogonal	Top 15	2nd Runner-Up at Miss Distrito Federal 2018; Previously Miss Plano Piloto CNB 2016 and competed at Miss Brazil World 2016; Last Miss Miss Distrito Federal Be Emotion
2018	Biah Rodrigues	21	1.71 m (5 ft 7 1/2 in)	Asa Norte	Top 15	
2017	Stéphane Dias	20	1.82 m (5 ft 11 1/2 in)	Asa Norte		
2016	Sarah Alves	20	1.78 m (5 ft 10 in)	Sudoeste/Octogonal		
2015	Amanda Balbino	21	1.85 m (6 ft 1 in)	Núcleo Bandeirante	Top 15	Won Miss Be Emotion.
Miss Distrito Federal Universe
2014	Luísa Lopes	24	1.77 m (5 ft 9 1/2 in)	Águas Claras	Top 10	
2013	Nathália Costa	23	1.78 m (5 ft 10 in)	Taguatinga		
2012	Tamiris Rodrigues Aguiar	21	1.75 m (5 ft 9 in)	Lago Sul	Top 5	
Miss Distrito Federal
2011	Alessandra Gomes Faria Baldini	28		Cruzeiro	Top 10	
2010	Lidiane de Lucena Matos			Cruzeiro	3rd Runner-Up	
2009	Denise Ribeiro Aliceral	18	1.80 m (5 ft 11 in)	Lago Sul	2nd Runner-Up	
2008	Ludmylla Costa Basthos	21		Águas Claras	Top 15	Won Best State Costume.
2007	Rafaela Studart			Lago Sul		
2006	Ana Cláudia Sandoval Pimenta			Taguatinga	Top 10	Won Miss Popular Vote.
2005	Adriana Watanabe Bambora			Taguatinga		
2004	Alynne da Silva Coutinho		1.80 m (5 ft 11 in)	Guará		
2003	Cynthia Andrade Campelo	19	1.75 m (5 ft 9 in)			
2002	Patrícia Wüstro					

=== Miss Brasília ===
From 1959 to 2001, the title was called Miss Brasília. In 1981, the District started to competed as Miss Distrito Federal at Miss Brazil but was still crowned under the Miss Brasília banner/title and the contest remained being called Miss Brasília until 2002.

Year	Name	Age (Note: Ages at the time of the pageant)	Height	Represented	Miss Brazil placement	Notes
Miss Brasília
2001	Danielle Gonçalves			Taguatinga		
2000	Tatiana Pereira Borges					
1999	Barbara Kelly Cezar Fonseca				Top 10	
1998	Liliane Muniz					
1997	Tatiana Bortoluzzi					
1996	Tatiana Calazans					
1995	Ezilene Mendes					
1994	Karen Diesel					
1993	No delegate sent in 1993 due to Miss Brazil 1993 being appointed rather than having a contest.					
1992	Kátia Steimpaid					
1991	No delegate sent in 1991.					
1990	No contest in 1990.					
1989	Gracy Schneider					
1988	Ana Cláudia Maranhão					
1987	Jacqueline Ribeiro Meirelles	24	1.75 m (5 ft 9 in)		Miss Brazil 1987	Competed in Miss Universe 1987.
1986	Patrícia Carneiro	18	1.78 m (5 ft 10 in)		Top 12	
1985	Helayne Cardoso			Associação dos Servidores do CERMA	Top 12	
1984	Vera Lúcia Petit			Taguatinga	Top 12	
1983	Carla Pompeu de Miranda			Shopping Venâncio 2000 (Associação dos Lojistas do Venâncio 2000)		
1982	Lígia Romagnoli			ASBAL	Top 12	
1981	Karin Keller Lins	18	1.80 m (5 ft 11 in)	Clube Naval de Brasília	2nd Runner-Up	
1980	Loiane Rogéria Aiache			Clube do Congresso	2nd Runner-Up; Miss Brazil World 1980	Won Miss Congeniality. Competed in Miss World 1980.
1979	Niriam Massi			Brasília Esporte Clube	Top 9	Won Best State Costume.
1978	Tanara Régia Bier			Associação Recreativa Bancrévea	3rd Runner-Up	
1977	Patrícia Viotti de Andrade			Iate Clube de Brasília	2nd Runner-Up; Miss Brazil International 1977	Won Miss Congeniality. Competed in Miss International 1977.
1976	Adelaide Fraga de Oliveira Filha			Associação Recreativa Bancrévea	2nd Runner-Up; Miss Brazil World 1976	Competed in Miss World 1976.
1975	Lisane Guimarães Távora			Clube Naval de Brasília	1st Runner-Up; Miss Brazil International 1975	4th Runner-Up at Miss International 1975.
1974	Mariza Sommer			Associação Recreativa Bancrévea	2nd Runner-Up; Miss Brazil World 1974	Top 15 at Miss World 1974.
1973	Kátia Dias Lopes			Associação Recreativa Bancrévea	Top 8	
1972	Maria Célia Coelho			Clube Área Alfa		
1971	Stella Cristina Leite	18		Clube Área Alfa	Top 8	
1970	Maria Regina Faria			Sindicato dos Comerciários		
1969	Marice Vanir Galvão			Casa do Estudante Secundarista	Top 8	
1968	Maria do Pilar Matos Ferro			Associação Recreativa Bancrévea	Top 8	
1967	Anísia Fonsêca			Clube Área Alfa	3rd Runner-Up	
1966	Maria Helena Cury			Clube União Árabe-Brasileira		
1965	Suely Tavares			Taguatinga Country Clube		
1964	Marli Igliori			Associação Recreativa Bancrévea		
1963	Denise Almeida			Iate Clube de Brasília	3rd Runner-Up	
1962	Sílvia Maria Resende			Minas Brasília Tênis Clube		
1961	Marília Brício			Iate Clube de Brasília		
1960	Magda Renate Pereira Pfrimer	20	1.71 m (5 ft 7 1/2 in)	Iate Clube de Brasília	1st Runner-Up; Miss Brazil International 1960	Previously crowned Miss Goiás 1958 and competed in Miss Brazil 1958. Competed in Miss International 1960.
1959	Martha Garcia					
1958	No delegate sent from 1954 to 1958 as the contest didn't exist until 1959.					
1957	No delegate sent from 1954 to 1958 as the contest didn't exist until 1959.					
1956	No delegate sent from 1954 to 1958 as the contest didn't exist until 1959.					
1955	No delegate sent from 1954 to 1958 as the contest didn't exist until 1959.					
1954	No delegate sent from 1954 to 1958 as the contest didn't exist until 1959.					
