= Miss Brazil 2017 =

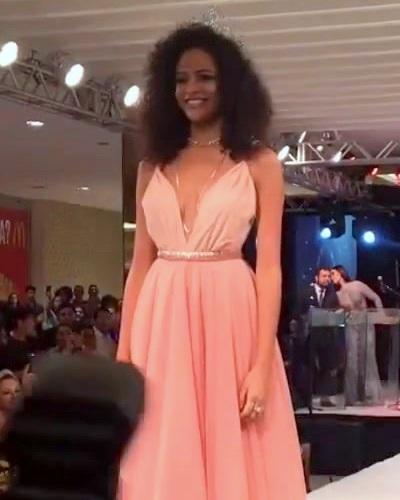
- Miss Brazil 2017, Monalysa Alcântara
- Date: 19 August 2017
- Presenters: Cássio Reis; Rayza Nicácio
- Entertainment: Miranda Kassin; Marina de La Riva
- Venue: Vermelhos Theater, Ilhabela, São Paulo, Brazil
- Broadcaster: Band; Band.com.br
- Entrants: 27
- Placements: 16
- Winner: Monalysa Alcântara; Piauí

Miss Brazil 2017 (Portuguese: Miss Brasil 2017), officially Miss Brazil Be Emotion 2017 (Portuguese: Miss Brasil Be Emotion 2017), was the 63rd edition of the Miss Brazil pageant. It was held on 19 August 2017 at the Vermelhos Theater in Ilhabela, São Paulo, Brazil and was hosted by Cássio Reis with Rayza Nicácio as a backstage correspondent. Raissa Santana of Paraná crowned her successor Monalysa Alcântara of Piauí at the end of the event. Alcântara represented Brazil at the Miss Universe 2017 pageant and placed in the Top 10.

== Results ==
=== Placements ===
Placement	Contestant
Miss Brazil 2017	Piauí – Monalysa Alcântara
1st Runner-Up	Rio Grande do Sul – Juliana Mueller
2nd Runner-Up	Espírito Santo – Stephany Pim
Top 5	Pernambuco – Iully Thaísa; Sergipe – Saiury Carvalho
Top 10	Acre – Kailane Amorim; Alagoas – Nathália Pastoura; Ceará – Aléxia Duarte; Maranhão – Ana Beatriz Nazareno; Rio Grande do Norte – Milena Balza
Top 16	Amazonas – Juliana Soares; Bahia – Caroline Oliveira; Goiás – Jeovanca Nascimento; Mato Grosso – Aline Fontes; Paraná – Patrícia Garcia; Tocantins - Islane Machado

=== Special awards ===
Award	Contestant
Miss Be Emotion	Ceará – Aléxia Duarte
Miss Popular Vote	Amazonas – Juliana Soares

== Contestants ==
State	Contestant	Age	Height	Hometown	Placement	Notes
(Acre (state)) Acre	Kailane Amorim	23	1.72 m (5 ft 7 1/2 in)	Brasiléia	Top 10	
Alagoas	Nathália Pastoura	23	1.72 m (5 ft 7 1/2 in)	Santana do Ipanema	Top 10	
Amapá	Jéssica Pacheco	26	1.75 m (5 ft 9 in)	Laranjal do Jari		
(Amazonas (Brazilian state)) Amazonas	Juliana Soares	23	1.75 m (5 ft 9 in)	Manaus	Top 16	
Bahia	Caroline Oliveira	24	1.72 m (5 ft 7 1/2 in)	Camaçari	Top 16	
Ceará	Aléxia Duarte	21	1.80 m (5 ft 11 in)	Fortaleza	Top 10	
(Federal District (Brazil)) Distrito Federal	Stéphane Dias	20	1.82 m (5 ft 11 1/2 in)	Asa Norte		
Espírito Santo	Stephany Pim Loren	23	1.71 m (5 ft 7 1/2 in)	Vitória	2nd Runner-Up	Previously Miss Espírito Santo Mundo/CNB 2016 and 2nd Runner-Up at Miss Brazil World 2016.
Goiás	Jeovanca Nascimento	26	1.74 m (5 ft 8 1/2 in)	Pirenópolis	Top 16	
Maranhão	Ana Beatriz Nazareno	20	1.73 m (5 ft 8 in)	Mata Roma	Top 10	
Mato Grosso	Aline Fontes	20	1.75 m (5 ft 9 in)	Cáceres	Top 16	
Mato Grosso do Sul	Isabela Cavalcante	23	1.68 m (5 ft 6 in)	Aquidauana		
Minas Gerais	Jéssica Porto	25	1.78 m (5 ft 10 in)	Ituiutaba		
Pará	Stéfany Figueiredo	26	1.80 m (5 ft 11 in)	Moju		
Paraíba	Larissa Aragão	22	1.68 m (5 ft 6 in)	Bananeiras		
(Paraná (state)) Paraná	Patricia Garcia	24	1.76 m (5 ft 9 1/2 in)	Cambé	Top 16	
Pernambuco	Iully Thaísa	22	1.74 m (5 ft 8 1/2 in)	Tamandaré	Top 5	Later Miss Fernando de Noronha CNB 2019 and competed at Miss Brazil CNB 2019.
Piauí	Monalysa Alcântara	18	1.77 m (5 ft 9 1/2 in)	Teresina	Miss Brazil 2017	
(Rio de Janeiro (state)) Rio de Janeiro	Isabel Correa	27	1.73 m (5 ft 8 in)	Belford Roxo		Previously Miss Sergipe Mundo/CNB 2009 and Miss Ilhas de Búzios Mundo/CNB 2014. Top 6 at Miss Brazil World 2009 and Top 10 at Miss Brazil World 2014.
Rio Grande do Norte	Milena Balza	19	1.81 m (5 ft 11 1/2 in)	São Gonçalo do Amarante	Top 10	
Rio Grande do Sul	Juliana Mueller	25	1.74 m (5 ft 8 1/2 in)	Terra de Areia	1st Runner-Up	
Rondônia	Maria Clara Vicco	18	1.73 m (5 ft 8 in)	Porto Velho		
Roraima	Nathália Lago	26	1.73 m (5 ft 8 in)	Caracaraí		Previously Miss Ilha do Marajó Mundo/CNB 2015 and Top 10 Miss Brazil World 2015.
(Santa Catarina (state)) Santa Catarina	Tamíris Ficht	24	1.69 m (5 ft 6 1/2 in)	Blumenau		
(São Paulo (state)) São Paulo	Karen Porfiro	26	1.74 m (5 ft 8 1/2 in)	São Paulo		
Sergipe	Saiury Carvalho	24	1.72 m (5 ft 7 1/2 in)	Aracaju	Top 5	
Tocantins	Islane Machado	21	1.82 m (5 ft 11 1/2 in)	Dueré	Top 16	
