= Monalysa Alcântara =

Miss Brazil 2017

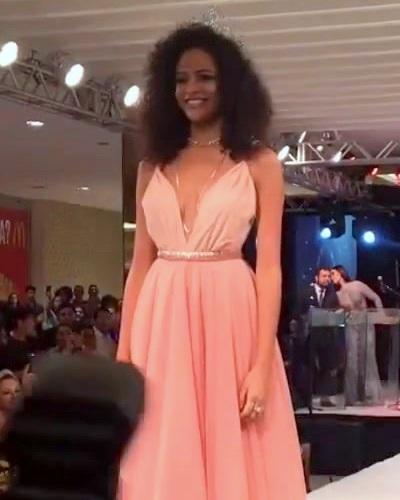
- Born: Monalysa Maria Alcântara Nascimento; 24 January 1999 (age 27); Teresina, Brazil
- Height: 1.77 m (5 ft 10 in)
- Beauty pageant titleholder
- Title: Miss Teen Piauí 2016; Miss Piauí 2017; Miss Brazil 2017
- Hair color: Black
- Eye color: Brown
- Major competitions: Miss Brazil 2017 (Winner); Miss Universe 2017 (Top 10)

Monalysa Maria Alcântara Nascimento (born 24 January 1999) is a Brazilian model and beauty pageant titleholder, who was crowned Miss Brasil 2017, becoming the first representative from Piauí and the third woman of Afro-Brazilian origin to win the crown. She represented Brazil at Miss Universe 2017, where she placed in the Top 10. Since 2023, she has been the State Director for the Miss Piauí state pageant.

== Life and career ==
Alcântara was born in Teresina, Piauí. She began modeling at age fourteen, and is a university student studying business administration and fashion.

== Pageantry ==
Alcântara began her pageant career after being crowned Miss Teen Piauí 2016, at age seventeen. She went on to represent Piauí at the Miss Teen Brazil 2016 pageant, where she was a runner-up. The following year, Alcântara was crowned Miss Piauí 2017. She represented Piauí in the Miss Brasil 2017 competition, and was crowned the winner, becoming the first woman from Piauí and third Afro-Brazilian to win the crown. She represented Brazil at the Miss Universe 2017 in Las Vegas where she made the Top 10.

Awards and achievements
Preceded by (Paraná (state)) Raissa Santana	Miss Universo Brasil; 2017	Succeeded by (Amazonas (Brazilian state)) Mayra Dias
Preceded by Lara Lobo	Miss Piauí; 2017	Succeeded by Naiely Lima
Preceded by Hanna Rocha	Miss Teen Piaui 2016	Succeeded by Gabriela Lacerda
