= Maria Brechane =

Brazilian beauty pageant titleholder

- Born: Maria Eduarda Ribeiro Brechane
- Beauty pageant titleholder
- Title: Miss Rio Grande do Sul 2023; Miss Brazil 2023
- Major competitions: Miss Brazil 2023; (Winner); Miss Universe 2023; (Unplaced)

Maria Eduarda Ribeiro Brechane (/məˈriː brəˈtʃeɪn/) is a Brazilian beauty pageant titleholder who won Miss Brazil 2023. She represented Brazil at the Miss Universe 2023 competition.

== Pageantry ==
As Miss Rio Grande do Sul Brechane won Miss Brazil 2023.

Brechane represented Brazil at Miss Universe 2023 held in San Salvador, El Salvador.

Awards and achievements
Preceded by Alina Furtado	Miss Rio Grande do Sul; 2023	Incumbent
Preceded by Mia Mamede (Espírito Santo)	Miss Brazil; 2023	Succeeded by Luana Cavalcante
