= Miss Brazil 2011 =

- Date: July 10, 2011
- Presenters: Nayla Micherif; Adriane Galisteu
- Entertainment: Diogo Nogueira; Marcelinho da Lua
- Venue: Tom Brasil, São Paulo, Brazil
- Broadcaster: Rede Bandeirantes
- Entrants: 27
- Placements: 15
- Winner: Priscila Machado; Rio Grande do Sul
- Congeniality: Renata Lustosa; Piauí

Miss Brazil 2011 was the 57th edition of the Miss Brazil pageant, it was held in São Paulo on July 23, 2011. The winner was Priscila Machado, who went on to represent Brazil in the 2011 Miss Universe pageant. The 1st runner-up went on to Miss International 2011 and the 2nd runner-up participated in Miss Continente Americano 2011.

Twenty-seven delegates from each state and the Federal District competed for the crown. The current titleholder, Débora Lyra of Minas Gerais, crowned her successor at the end of the event.

== Results ==
=== Placements ===
Final Results	Contestants
Miss Brazil 2011; Miss Brazil Universe 2011	Rio Grande do Sul – Priscila Machado
1st runner-up Miss Brazil International 2011	Bahia – Gabriella Marcelino
2nd runner-up Miss Brazil Cont. Americano 2011	Acre – Danielle Knidel Soares
3rd runner-up	São Paulo – Rafaela Butareli
4th runner-up	Amazonas – Tammy Cavalcante
Top 10; Semifinalists	Distrito Federal – Alessandra Baldini; Espírito Santo – Marcela Granato; Mato Grosso – Jéssica Duarte; Mato Grosso do Sul – Raíza Vidal; Rio Grande do Norte – Daliane Menezes
Top 15; Semifinalists	Ceará – Anastácia Duarte; Minas Gerais – Izabela Drumond; Pará – Ana Paula Padilha; Paraná – Gabriela Pereira; Santa Catarina – Michelly Böhnen

=== Special awards ===
- Miss Internet (winner would go to semis): Michelly Böhnen (Santa Catarina)
- Miss Congeniality: Renata Lustosa (Piauí)
- Best National Costume: Mariana Figueiredo (Rio de Janeiro)

== Contestants ==
Miss Brazil 2011
Number	State	Contestant
01	(Acre (state)) Acre	Danielle Knidell Da Rosa
02	Alagoas	Stefanie Carvalho Oliveira
03	Amapá	Josiene Modesto Ferreira
04	(Amazonas (Brazilian state)) Amazonas	Tammy Cavalcante Guedes
05	Bahia	Gabriela Rocha Marcelino
06	Ceará	Anastácia Mariane Duarte Dos Passos
07	(Federal District (Brazil)) Distrito Federal	Alessandra Carolayny Baldini Bôavista
08	Espírito Santo	Marcela Granato Paiva
09	Goiás	Wiviany Oliveira Odriani
10	Maranhão	Nayanna Carlessa Ferres Bianco
11	Mato Grosso	Jéssica Liriany Duarte Pinho
12	Mato Grosso do Sul	Raiza Bianca Vidal Ramirez
13	Minas Gerais	Izabela Favia Drumond Guimarães
14	Pará	Ana Paula Padilha Recalde
15	Paraíba	Priscilla Durand Matos
16	(Paraná (state)) Paraná	Gabriela Sandra Pereira Mosser
17	Pernambuco	Leidiane Vasconcelos Rûa
18	Piauí	Renata Lustosa Ferrini
19	(Rio de Janeiro (state)) Rio de Janeiro	Mariana Figueiredo Da Costa
20	Rio Grande do Norte	Daliane Natalya Menezes Ocampo
21	Rio Grande do Sul	Priscila Machado
22	Rondônia	Aline Wendy Cabral Habbid
23	(Roraima) Roramia	Nel Anne Rodrigues Barbosa
24	(Santa Catarina (state)) Santa Catarina	Michelly Böhnen
25	(São Paulo (state)) São Paulo	Rafaela Elena Butarelli
26	Sergipe	Danielle Paes Moreira
27	Tocantins	Jaqueline Verrel Portela
