= Miss Brazil 2009 =

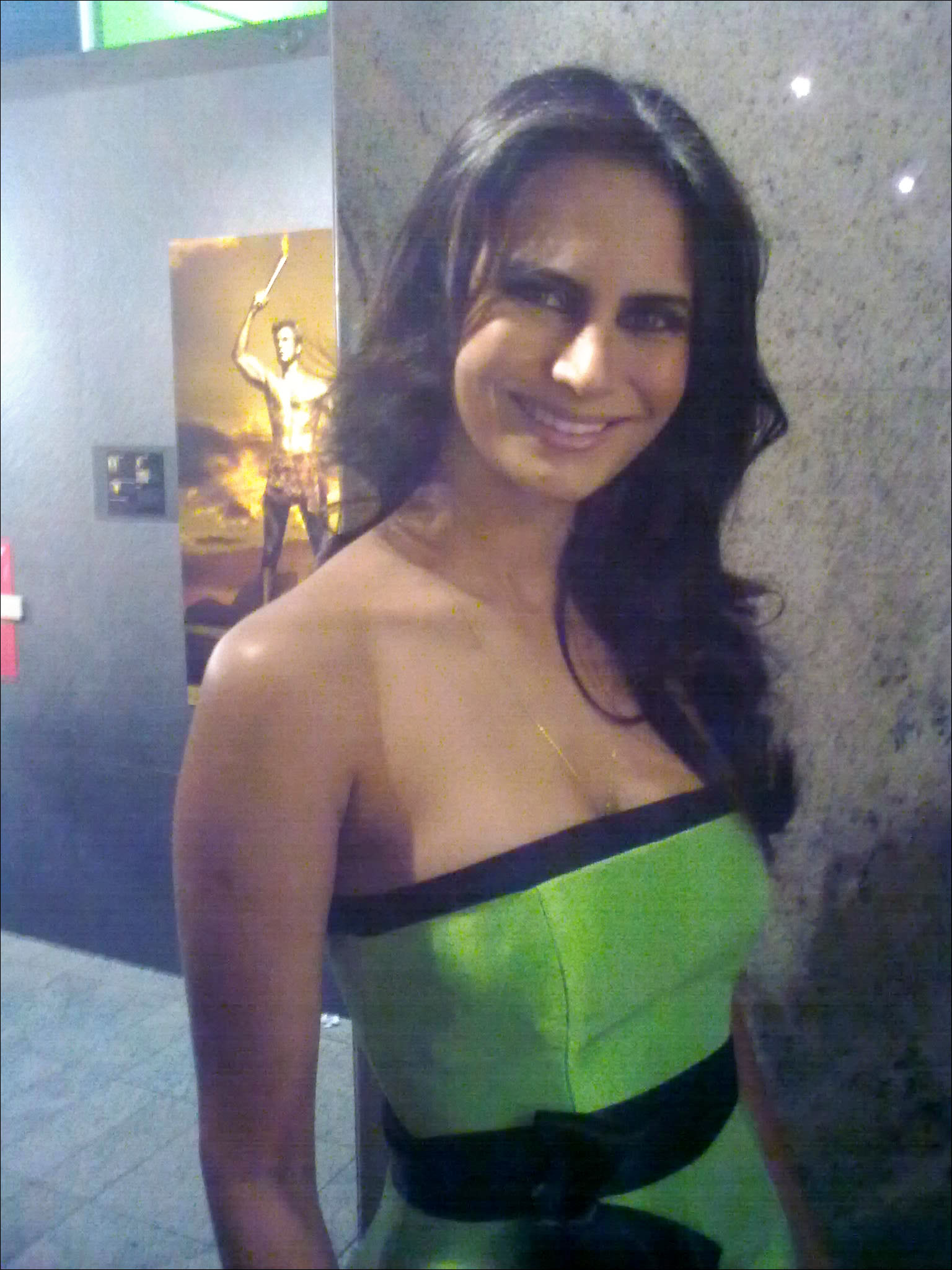
- Miss Brazil 2009, Larissa Costa
- Date: 9 May 2009
- Presenters: Nayla Micherif; Renata Fan
- Entertainment: Jorge Aragão
- Venue: Memorial da América Latina Complex, São Paulo, São Paulo State, Brazil
- Broadcaster: Band
- Entrants: 27
- Placements: 15
- Winner: Larissa Costa; Rio Grande do Norte
- Congeniality: Isabela Nascimento; Pernambuco

Miss Brazil 2009 (Portuguese: Miss Brasil 2009) was the 55th edition of the Miss Brazil pageant. It was held on 9 May 2009 at the Latin American Memorial Complex in São Paulo, São Paulo State, Brazil and was hosted by Nayla Micherif and Renata Fan. Natálya Anderle of Rio Grande do Sul crowned her successor Larissa Costa of Rio Grande do Norte at the end of the event. Costa represented Brazil at the Miss Universe 2009 pageant. 1st Runner-Up, Rayanne Morais of Minas Gerais represented the country at Miss International 2009.

== Results ==
Final results	Contestant
Miss Brazil 2009; Miss Brazil Universe 2009	Rio Grande do Norte – Larissa Costa
1st Runner-Up; Miss Brazil International 2009	Minas Gerais – Rayanne Morais
2nd Runner-Up	Distrito Federal – Denise Aliceral
3rd Runner-Up	Pará - Rayana Brêda
4th Runner-Up	Ceará – Khrisley Karlen
Top 10	Bahia – Paloma Vega; Paraná – Karine Martins; Rio de Janeiro – Fernanda Gomes; Rio Grande do Sul – Bruna Felisberto; Santa Catarina – Francine Arruda
Top 15	Espírito Santo – Bianca Lopes; Goiás – Anielly Barros; Mato Grosso do Sul – Pilar Velásquez; Paraíba – Flora Meira; São Paulo – Sílvia Novais

=== Special awards ===
Award	Winner
Best State Costume	Minas Gerais – Rayanne Morais
Miss Congeniality (Miss Simpatia)	Pernambuco – Isabela Nascimento
Miss Popular Vote	Minas Gerais – Rayanne Morais

== Contestants ==
The delegates for Miss Brazil 2009 were:

- (Acre (state)) Acre - Elkar Portela de Almeida
- Alagoas - Kamyla Brandão Loureiro Moura
- Amapá - Enyellen Campos Salles
- (Amazonas (Brazilian state)) Amazonas - Cecília Maria Alves Stadler
- Bahia - Paloma Garzedim Vega
- Ceará - Khrisley Karlen Gonçalves da Silva
- (Federal District (Brazil)) Distrito Federal - Denise Ribeiro Aliceral
- Espírito Santo - Bianca Lopes Gava
- Goiás - Anielly Campos Barros
- Maranhão - Thaís dos Santos Portela
- Mato Grosso - Mônica Huppes
- Mato Grosso do Sul - Pilar Velásquez
- Minas Gerais - Rayanne Fernanda de Morais
- Pará - Rayana de Carvalho Brêda
- Paraíba - Flora Alexandre Meira
- (Paraná (state)) Paraná - Karine Martins de Souza
- Pernambuco - Isabela dos Santos Nascimento
- Piauí - Francisca Vanessa Barros da Costa
- (Rio de Janeiro (state)) Rio de Janeiro - Fernanda Gomes
- Rio Grande do Norte - Larissa Costa Silva de Oliveira
- Rio Grande do Sul - Bruna Gabriele Felisberto
- Rondônia - Lorena Garcia Mendonça
- Roraima - Ana Luiza de Oliveira Pinto
- (Santa Catarina (state)) Santa Catarina - Francine Arruda
- (São Paulo (state)) São Paulo - Sílvia Novais Silva
- Sergipe - Luna Clayane Meneses da Silva
- Tocantins - Natália Araújo Bichuete

== Notes ==
=== Replacements ===
- Maranhão - Louisse Freire was replaced by Thaís Portela.
- Tocantins - Priscila Nascimento was replaced by Natália Bichuete.
