= Miss Brazil 2008 =

- Date: 13 April 2008
- Presenters: Nayla Micherif; Guilherme Arruda; Renata Fan
- Entertainment: Alexandre Pires; Olodum; Jorge Ben Jor; Gabriel, o Pensador
- Venue: Citibank Hall, São Paulo, São Paulo State, Brazil
- Broadcaster: Band
- Entrants: 27
- Placements: 15
- Winner: Natálya Anderle; Rio Grande do Sul
- Congeniality: Kayonara Walleska; Paraíba

Miss Brazil 2008 (Portuguese: Miss Brasil 2008) was the 54th edition of the Miss Brazil pageant. It was held on 13 April 2008 at Citibank Hall in São Paulo, São Paulo State, Brazil and was hosted by Nayla Micherif and Guilherme Arruda with Renata Fan as a commentator. Natália Guimarães of Minas Gerais crowned her successor Natálya Anderle of Rio Grande do Sul at the end of the event. Anderle represented Brazil at the Miss Universe 2008 pageant. 1st Runner-Up, Vanessa Vidal of Ceará represented the country at Miss International 2008.

== Results ==
Final results	Contestant
Miss Brazil 2008; Miss Brazil Universe 2008	Rio Grande do Sul – Natálya Anderle
1st Runner-Up; Miss Brazil International 2008	Ceará – Vanessa Vidal
2nd Runner-Up	Goiás – Cyntia Cordeiro
3rd Runner-Up	São Paulo - Janaína Barcelos
4th Runner-Up	Minas Gerais – Marina Marques
Top 10	Espírito Santo – Francielem Riguete; Pará – Bruna Pontes; Paraná – Bronie Alteiro; Rio de Janeiro – Camilla Hentzy; Rio Grande do Norte – Andressa Mello
Top 15	Distrito Federal – Ludmylla Basthos; Maranhão – Roberta Tavares; Pernambuco – Michelle Fernandes; Piauí – Marinna Lima; Santa Catarina – Gabriela Pinho

=== Special awards ===
Award	Winner
Best State Costume	Distrito Federal – Ludmylla Basthos
Miss Congeniality (Miss Simpatia)	Paraíba – Kayonara Walleska
Miss Popular Vote	Ceará – Vanessa Lima Vidal

== Contestants ==
The delegates for Miss Brazil 2008 were:

- (Acre (state)) Acre - Achemar Souza de Castro
- Alagoas - Williana Graziella Siqueira
- Amapá - Kamila Katrine Campos Batista
- (Amazonas (Brazilian state)) Amazonas - Gabrielle Costa de Souza
- Bahia - Daniele Valadão Pinto
- Ceará - Vanessa Lima Vidal
- (Federal District (Brazil)) Distrito Federal - Ludmylla Costa Basthos
- Espírito Santo - Francielem Ramos Riguete
- Goiás - Cyntia Cordeiro e Souza
- Maranhão - Roberta Ribeiro Tavares
- Mato Grosso - Flávia Piana Pereira
- Mato Grosso do Sul - Pilar Velásquez
- Minas Gerais - Tainara Ferreira da Silva Terenada
- Pará - Bruna dos Santos Pontes
- Paraíba - Kayonara Walleska de Macedo Silva
- (Paraná (state)) Paraná - Bronie Cordeiro Alteiro
- Pernambuco - Michelle Fernandes da Costa
- Piauí - Marinna de Paiva Lima
- (Rio de Janeiro (state)) Rio de Janeiro - Camilla Paiva Hentzy
- Miss Rio Grande do Norte - Andressa Simone Mello
- Rio Grande do Sul - Natálya Alberto Anderle
- Rondônia - Maíra Mallmann Lima
- Roraima - Emmyllie Daniele Muniz Cruz
- (Santa Catarina (state)) Santa Catarina - Gabriela Pinho
- (São Paulo (state)) São Paulo - Janaína Barcelos de Morais
- Sergipe - Karina Aparecida Borges
- Tocantins - Kelly Bezerra de Aquino
