= Miss Brazil 1999 =

Beauty pageant edition

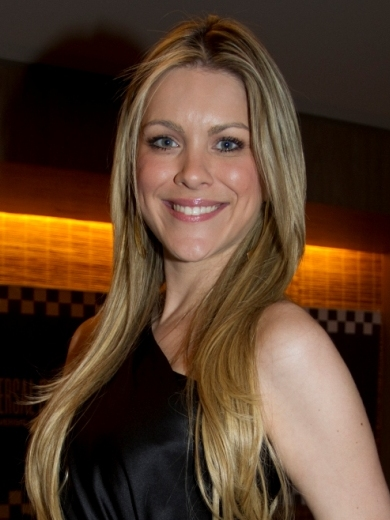
- Miss Brazil 1999, Renata Fan
- Date: 8 April 1999
- Presenters: Deise Nunes
- Venue: Scala Rio, Rio de Janeiro, Rio de Janeiro State, Brazil
- Entrants: 27
- Placements: 10
- Winner: Renata Fan; Rio Grande do Sul
- Congeniality: Thays Bitencourt; Goiás
- Photogenic: Renata Fan; Rio Grande do Sul

Miss Brazil 1999 (Portuguese: Miss Brasil 1999) was the 45th edition of the Miss Brazil pageant. It was held on 8 April 1999 at Scala Rio in Rio de Janeiro, Rio de Janeiro State, Brazil and was hosted by Deise Nunes. Michella Marchi of Mato Grosso do Sul crowned her successor Renata Fan of Rio Grande do Sul at the end of the event. Fan represented Brazil at the Miss Universe 1999 pageant. 1st Runner-Up, Paula Carvalho of Rio de Janeiro, represented Brazil at Miss World 1999 and 2nd Runner-Up, Alessandra Nascimento of Minas Gerais, represented the country at Miss International 1999.

== Results ==
| Final results | Contestant |
|---|---|
| Miss Brazil 1999; Miss Brazil Universe 1999 | Rio Grande do Sul – Renata Fan |
| 1st Runner-Up; Miss Brazil World 1999 | Rio de Janeiro – Paula Carvalho |
| 2nd Runner-Up; Miss Brazil International 1999 | Minas Gerais – Alessandra Nascimento |
| 3rd Runner-Up | Mato Grosso - Karine Bonatto |
| 4th Runner-Up | Santa Catarina – Aline Schmitt |
| Top 10 | Amapá – Luciana Santos; Brasília – Barbara Fonseca; Pará – Renata França; Paraná – Marken Valerius; São Paulo – Melissa Naldinho |

=== Special awards ===
| Award | Winner |
|---|---|
| Best State Costume | Mato Grosso – Karine Bonatto |
| Miss Congeniality (Miss Simpatia) | Goiás – Thays Bitencourt |
| Miss Photogenic | Rio Grande do Sul – Renata Fan |

== Contestants ==
The delegates for Miss Brazil 1999 were:

- (Acre (state)) Acre - Gleiciane da Silva Gattas Dias
- Alagoas - Elena Cristina Bomfim da Silva
- Amapá - Luciana Alves dos Santos
- (Amazonas (Brazilian state)) Amazonas - Joice Lima Barros
- Bahia - Maria Carolina Magnavita Oliveira
- Brasília - Barbara Kelly Cezar Fonseca
- Ceará - Geisa Jinkings de Oliveira
- Espírito Santo - Kátia Peterle Camargos
- Goiás - Thays Bittencourt
- Maranhão - Amélia Cristina Araújo Ferreira
- Mato Grosso - Karine Bonatto
- Mato Grosso do Sul - Mirian Jackeline Stech Pavão
- Minas Gerais - Alessandra Ferreira do Nascimento
- Pará - Renata Karolyne Brasil França
- Paraíba - Juliana Pereira Luna
- (Paraná (state)) Paraná - Marken Maria Valerius
- Pernambuco - Jadilza Bernardo de Carvalho
- Piauí - Lilyan de Melo Barros
- (Rio de Janeiro (state)) Rio de Janeiro - Paula de Souza Carvalho
- Rio Grande do Norte - Tatiana Santos
- Rio Grande do Sul - Renata Bomfiglio Fan
- Rondônia - Priscila Giacomolli
- Roraima - Thelma Silva de Araújo
- (Santa Catarina (state)) Santa Catarina - Aline Schmitt Crescêncio
- (São Paulo (state)) São Paulo - Melissa Naldinho Coelho Barbosa
- Sergipe - Fernanda Lacerda de Souza
- Tocantins - Luziane Baierle
