= Curimatá =

Curimatá Curimatá
- Municipality
- Nickname: Gety
- Coordinates: 10.0358°S 44.3058°W
- Country: Brazil
- Region: Northeast
- State: Piauí
- Mesoregion: Southeast

Population
  - Total: 11,000
- Time zone: UTC−3 (BRT)
- Postal code: 64960/000
- Area code: +55 89

Curimatá is a municipality in the state of Piauí in the Northeast region of Brazil

== See also ==
- List of municipalities in Piauí
