= Miss Brazil CNB 2019 =

Beauty pageant edition

- Date: September 3, 2019
- Presenters: Juliano Crema
- Entertainment: Wagner Torre
- Venue: Dall'Onder Grand Hotel, Bento Gonçalves, Rio Grande do Sul, Brazil
- Broadcaster: R7
- Entrants: 42
- Placements: 20
- Winner: Elís Miele Coelho; Espírito Santo
- Congeniality: Anne Karoline Lisboa; Alagoas

Miss Brazil CNB 2019 was the 30th edition of the Miss Brazil CNB pageant and the 5th under CNB Miss Brazil. The contest took place on September 3, 2019. Each state, the Federal District and various Insular Regions & Cities competed for the title. Jéssica Carvalho of Piauí crowned her successor, Elís Miele Coelho of Espírito Santo at the end of the contest. Miele represented Brazil at Miss World 2019. The contest was held at the Dall'Onder Grand Hotel in Bento Gonçalves, Rio Grande do Sul, Brazil.

== Results ==
Final results	Contestant
Miss Brazil CNB 2019/2020	Espírito Santo - Elís Miele Coelho
1st Runner-up	Caminho dos Príncipes - Fernanda Souza
Top 5	Fernando de Noronha - Iully Thaísa; Rio Grande do Sul - Jéssica Lírio; Santa Catarina - Elizama Aguilar
Top 10	Araguaia do Pará - Fabrícia Belfort; Bahia - Isabelle Andrade; Brasília - Maiza Santa Rita; Paraná - Deise Ribas; São Paulo - Michelle Valle
Top 20	Amazonas - Nathaly Félix; (Rio Grande do Norte) Costa das Dunas - Larissa Trajano; Goiás - Fernanda Bispo; (Mato Grosso) Ilhas do Araguaia - Geicyelly Mendes; Mato Grosso - Larissa Neiverth; Minas Gerais - Rafaella Felipe; Pará - Isabella Garcia; Paraíba - Larissa Aragão; Rio de Janeiro - Esthéfane Souza; Rio Grande do Norte - Marcelle Bezerra

=== Regional Queens of Beauty ===
Award	Winner
Miss Midwest	Brasília - Maiza Santa Rita
Miss North	Araguaia do Pará - Fabrícia Belfort
Miss Northeast	Fernando de Noronha - Iully Thaísa
Miss South	Caminho dos Príncipes - Fernanda Souza
Miss Southeast	Espírito Santo - Elís Miele Coelho

=== Special awards ===
Award	Winner
Best Hair	Paraná - Deise Ribas
Best Interview	São Paulo - Michelle Valle
Miss Beauty with Essence	Rio Grande do Sul - Jéssica Lírio
Miss Business Card News	(Mato Grosso) Ilhas do Araguaia - Geicyelly Mendes
Miss Congeniality	Alagoas - Anne Karoline Lisboa
Miss Cordiality	Mato Grosso do Sul - Bianca Loyolla
Miss Destaque	Madeira Mamoré - Thaisi Dias
Miss Elegance	Caminho dos Príncipes - Fernanda Souza
Miss Internet	Espírito Santo - Elís Miele Coelho
Miss Top Model	Minas Gerais - Rafaella Felipe

== Challenge Events ==
=== Beauty with a Purpose ===
Final results	Contestant
Winner	Fernando de Noronha - Iully Thaísa

=== Cover Girl ===
Final results	Contestant
Winner	São Paulo - Michelle Valle

=== Miss Popularity ===
Final results	Contestant
Winner	Amazonas - Nathaly Félix

=== Miss Social Media ===
Final results	Contestant
Winner	Caminho dos Príncipes - Fernanda Souza

=== Miss Talent ===
Final results	Contestant
Winner	(Mato Grosso) Ilhas do Araguaia - Geicyelly Mendes

== Delegates ==
The delegates for Miss Brazil CNB 2019 were:

=== States ===
- Acre - Flávia Ferrari
- Alagoas - Anne Karoline Lisboa
- Amapá - Débora Layla
- Amazonas - Nathaly Félix
- Bahia - Isabelle Andrade
- Brasília - Maiza Santa Rita
- Ceará - Melissa Lins
- Espírito Santo - Elís Miele Coelho
- Goiás - Fernanda Bispo
- Mato Grosso - Larissa Neiverth
- Mato Grosso do Sul - Bianca Loyolla
- Minas Gerais - Rafaella Felipe
- Pará - Isabella Garcia
- Paraíba - Larissa Aragão
- Paraná - Deise Caroline Ribas
- Pernambuco - Yasmin Fernanda
- Piauí - Vanessa Araújo
- Rio de Janeiro - Esthéfane Souza
- Rio Grande do Norte - Marcelle Bezerra
- Rio Grande do Sul - Jéssica Lírio
- Rondônia - Flávia Alencar
- Santa Catarina - Elizama Aguilar
- São Paulo - Michelle Valle
- Sergipe - Marianna Barreto

=== Insular Regions and Cities ===
- (São Paulo (state)) ABCD Region - Thaís Bonome
- Alto Tietê-Cantareira - Nathália Gonçalves
- Araguaia do Pará - Fabrícia Belfort
- Bem Viver Paulista - Giovanna Coltro
- Caminho dos Cânions - Roberta Mocelin
- Caminho dos Príncipes - Fernanda Souza
- Caminhos do Alto Vale - Larissa Nehring
- (Goiás) Cerrado Goiano - Júlia Alves
- (Rio Grande do Norte) Costa das Dunas - Larissa Trajano
- Fernando de Noronha - Iully Thaísa
- Greater São Paulo - Sandy Menezes
- (Rio Grande do Sul) Ilha da Pintada - Bruna Maglioli
- (Rio Grande do Sul) Ilha dos Lobos - Ana Flávia Giacomini
- (Mato Grosso) Ilhas do Araguaia - Geicyelly Mendes
- Madeira Mamoré - Thaisi Dias
- (Mato Grosso) Pantanal Matogrossense - Thayná Mello
- São Paulo Capital - Ana Júlia Prado
- Vale Europeu - Paula Schirmer

== Notes ==
=== Did not compete ===
- Distrito Federal (competed as Miss Brasília)
- Maranhão
- Roraima
- Tocantins
