= Santana do São Francisco =

Municipality in Sergipe, Brazil

Coordinates: 10°17′27″S 36°36′28″W

- Municipality
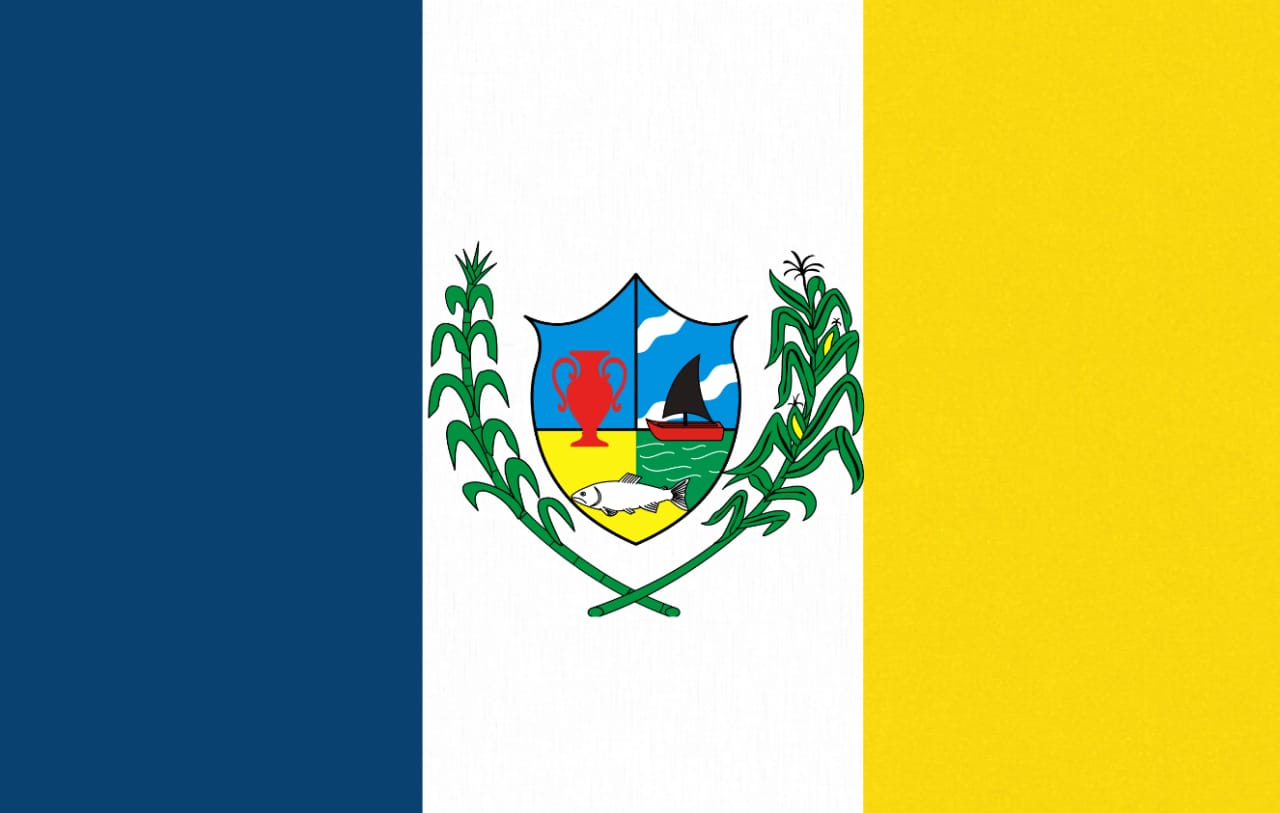
- Flag Coat of arms
- Interactive map of Santana do São Francisco
- Country: Brazil
- Time zone: UTC−3 (BRT)

Santana do São Francisco (Central northeastern Portuguese pronunciation: [sɐ̃ˈtɐ̃nɐ ˈdʊ ˈsɐ̃w fɾɐ̃ˈsisku]) is a municipality located in the Brazilian state of Sergipe. Its population was 7,844 (2020) and its area is 46 km^{2}.

== See also ==
- List of municipalities in Sergipe
