= Miss Brazil 2023 =

68th Miss Brazil competition, national beauty pageant edition

- Date: July 8, 2023
- Venue: São Paulo, Brazil
- Entrants: 27
- Placements: 16
- Returns: Alagoas
- Winner: Maria Brechane; Rio Grande do Sul

Miss Brazil 2023 (Portuguese: Miss Brasil 2023), officially Miss Universe Brazil 2023 (Portuguese: Miss Universo Brasil 2023) was the 69th edition of the Miss Brazil pageant, held in São Paulo, Brazil, on July 8, 2023. It is the third under the new Miss Universe Brazil management.

Mia Mamede of Espírito Santo crowned Maria Brechane of Rio Grande do Sul as her successor at the end of the event. Brechane represented Brazil at the Miss Universe 2023 competition in El Salvador but she failed to enter the Top 20.

== Results ==
=== Placements ===
Placement	Contestant
Miss Brazil 2023	Rio Grande do Sul – Maria Eduarda Brechane
1st Runner-Up	Mato Grosso – Bárbara Reis
2nd Runner-Up	São Paulo – Vitória Brodt
Top 7	Amazonas – Alice Casanova §; Goiás – Renata Guerra; Pará – Milena Gomes; Sergipe – Gabriela Botelho
Top 16	Alagoas – Ruthy Raphaella; Amapá – Alessandra Barcellos; Ceará – Beatriz Militão; Distrito Federal – Thayná Lima; Paraná – Mariana Becker; Pernambuco – Maria Erivânia Izídio; Rio Grande do Norte – Giovanna Maria França; Santa Catarina – Sasha Bauer; Tocantins – Vitória Schneider

§ – Voted into the Top 16 by viewers

== Contestants ==
The confirmed delegates are as follows

State	Contestant	Age (Note: Ages at the time of the pageant)	Hometown	Placement
Acre	Ludimila Souza	21	Xapuri	
Alagoas	Ruthy Raphaella		Taquarana	Top 16
Amapá	Alessandra Barcellos	24	Macapá	Top 16
Amazonas	Alice Casanova	25	Coari	Top 7
Bahia	Raissa Rodrigues	22	Barra da Estiva	
Ceará	Beatriz Militão	25	Trairi	Top 16
Distrito Federal	Thayná de Lima	27	Brasília	Top 16
Espírito Santo	Anna Beatriz Pereira	19	Vitória	
Goiás	Renata Guerra	27	Anápolis	Top 7
Maranhão	Lorena Maia	27	São Luís	
Mato Grosso	Bárbara Reis	25	Sinop	First Runner-Up
Mato Grosso do Sul	Rebeca Vianna	24	Campo Grande	
Minas Gerais	Isadora Lúcia de Souza	21	Ouro Preto	
Pará	Milena Gomes	25	Salvaterra	Top 7
Paraíba	Ana Vitória Araújo	26	Pocinhos	
Paraná	Mariana Becker	26	Francisco Beltrão	Top 16
Pernambuco	Maria Erivânia Izídio	24	Santa Cruz do Capibaribe	Top 16
Piauí	Gabriela Menezes	26	Parnaíba	
Rio de Janeiro	Paula Cardoso		Nova Iguaçu	
Rio Grande do Norte	Giovanna Maria França	22	Natal	Top 16
Rio Grande do Sul	Maria Eduarda Brechane	19	Rio Grande	Miss Brazil 2023
Rondônia	Vitória Ribeiro	19	Vilhena	
Roraima	Manoela Salcides	23	Boa Vista	
Santa Catarina	Sasha Bauer	27	Blumenau	Top 16
São Paulo	Vitória Brodt	24	Campinas	Second Runner-Up
Sergipe	Gabriela Botelho	22	Aracaju	Top 7
Tocantins	Vitória Schneider	23	Palmas	Top 16
