= Miss Brazil 2022 =

67th Miss Brazil competition, national beauty pageant edition

- Date: July 19, 2022
- Presenters: Cris Barth
- Venue: Villa Vérico, São Paulo, Brazil
- Entrants: 26
- Placements: 16
- Withdrawals: Alagoas
- Winner: Mia Mamede; Espírito Santo

Miss Brazil 2022 (Portuguese: Miss Brasil 2022), officially Miss Universe Brazil 2022 (Portuguese: Miss Universo Brasil 2022) was the 68th edition of the Miss Brazil pageant and also the second under the new Miss Universe Brazil management, held at Villa Vérico in São Paulo, Brazil, on July 19, 2022.

Teresa Santos of Ceará crowned Mia Mamede of Espírito Santo as her successor at the end of the event. This is the first time that Espírito Santo got the title. Mamede represented Brazil at the Miss Universe 2022 pageant, but was unplaced.

== Results ==
=== Placements ===
Placement	Contestant
Miss Brazil 2022	Espírito Santo – Maria Eugênia Mamede
1st Runner-Up	Amazonas – Rebeca Portilho
2nd Runner-Up	Minas Gerais – Isadora Murta
3rd Runner-Up	Ceará – Luana Lobo
4th Runner-Up	Rio Grande do Sul – Alina Furtado
Top 10	Bahia – Amanda Malaquias; Maranhão – Natália Seipel; Mato Grosso – Eduarda Zanella; Paraná – Shaienne Borges; Rio de Janeiro – Esthéfane Souza
Top 16	Pará – Beatriz Ornela; Paraíba – Joyce Freitas; Piauí – Jéssyca Castro; Roraima – Kalyana Machado; São Paulo – Adrielle Pieve; Sergipe – Ingrid Prata

== Contestants ==
26 contestants were selected to compete.

State	Contestant	Age (Note: Ages at the time of the pageant)	Hometown
Acre	Juliana Melo	26	Cruzeiro do Sul
Amapá	Lycia Ribeiro	24	Macapá
Amazonas	Rebeca Portilho	23	Manaus
Bahia	Amanda Malaquias	26	Ibipeba
Ceará	Luana Lobo	27	Fortaleza
Distrito Federal	Nina Assis	25	Taguatinga
Espírito Santo	Mia Mamede	26	Vitória
Goiás	Camille Gomide	25	Anápolis
Maranhão	Natália Seipel	24	São José de Ribamar
Mato Grosso	Eduarda Zanella	20	Tangará da Serra
Mato Grosso do Sul	Giovanna Grigolli	25	Três Lagoas
Minas Gerais	Isadora Murta	24	Contagem
Pará	Beatriz Ornela	21	Belém
Paraíba	Joyce Freitas	19	Solânea
Paraná	Shaienne Borges	26	São José dos Pinhais
Pernambuco	Ana Luiza Gonçalves	27	Petrolina
Piauí	Jéssyca Castro	23	Teresina
Rio de Janeiro	Esthéfane Souza	26	Volta Redonda
Rio Grande do Norte	Maria Eduarda Morais	25	Natal
Rio Grande do Sul	Alina Furtado	27	Piratini
Rondônia	Kamila Coelho	22	Vilhena
Roraima	Kalyana Machado	23	Caracaraí
Santa Catarina	Fernanda Souza	26	Joinville
São Paulo	Adrielle Pieve	26	Três Pontas
Sergipe	Ingrid Prata	20	Salgado
Tocantins	Phatricia Araújo	22	Palmas

== Juries ==
- Gustavo Aquino – Plastic surgeon
- Renata Kuerten – Model and TV presenter
- João Antônio – Weight loss specialist
- Gabriela Mansur – Former prosecutor and woman's rights specialist
- Fábio Luís de Paula – Folha de S. Paulo columnist
- Ariana Lima – Photographer
- Leonardo Gaspar – Psychologist
- Fábio Arruda – Former reality Show participant, Etiquette and behavioral consultant
