= Miss Brazil 2004 =

- Date: 15 April 2004
- Presenters: Nayla Micherif; Gustavo Gianetti; Thiago Mansur; Astrid Fontenelle; Fernando Scherer; Sabrina Parlatore; Luciana Curtis; Isabella Fiorentino
- Entertainment: OSESP; Zezé Di Camargo & Luciano; Paula Lima; Alexandre Pires; Ellen de Lima; DJ Felipe Venâncio; Banda MB
- Venue: Credicard Hall, São Paulo, São Paulo State, Brazil
- Broadcaster: Band
- Entrants: 27
- Placements: 10
- Winner: Fabiane Niclotti; Rio Grande do Sul
- Congeniality: Juliana Melo; Sergipe

Miss Brazil 2004 (Portuguese: Miss Brasil 2004) was the 50th edition of the Miss Brazil pageant. It was held on 15 April 2004 at Credicard Hall in São Paulo, Brazil and was hosted by Nayla Micherif and Gustavo Gianetti with Thiago Mansur, Astrid Fontenelle, Fernando Scherer, Sabrina Parlatore, Luciana Curtis, and Isabella Fiorentino all as commentators. Gislaine Ferreira, who is originally from Minas Gerais but competed as Miss Tocantins, crowned her successor Fabiane Niclotti of Rio Grande do Sul at the end of the event. Niclotti represented Brazil at the Miss Universe 2004 pageant. 1st Runner-Up, Iara Coelho of Minas Gerais, represented Brazil at Miss World 2004 and 2nd Runner-Up, Grazi Massafera of Paraná, represented the country at Miss International 2004.

== Results ==
Final results	Contestant
Miss Brazil 2004; Miss Brazil Universe 2004	Rio Grande do Sul – Fabiane Niclotti †
1st Runner-Up; Miss Brazil World 2004	Minas Gerais – Iara Coelho
2nd Runner-Up; Miss Brazil International 2004	Paraná – Grazi Massafera
3rd Runner-Up	Roraima - Francielly Araújo
4th Runner-Up	Amazonas – Tatiane Alves
Top 10	Alagoas – Danielle Souza; Bahia – Danielle Abrantes; Rio de Janeiro – Carolina Pires; Rondônia – Eunice Pratti; Santa Catarina – Glenda Saccomano

=== Special awards ===
Award	Winner
Miss Congeniality (Miss Simpatia)	Sergipe – Juliana Melo
Miss Popular Vote	Rio Grande do Sul – Fabiane Niclotti †

== Contestants ==
The delegates for Miss Brazil 2004 were:

- Acre - Fabíola Gomes dos Santos
- Alagoas - Fernanda Scorsatto Dorigon
- Amapá - Ellen Paula Coutinho Santana
- Amazonas - Priscilla Meirelles de Almeida
- Bahia - Karoline Araújo de Souza
- Ceará - Jorlene Rodrigues Cordeiro
- Federal District name=Distrito Federal - Alynne da Silva Coutinho
- Espírito Santo - Angélica Corona Bassini
- Goiás - Jane de Sousa Borges Oliveira
- Maranhão - Lara Polyane Furtado Cunha
- Mato Grosso - Betânia Cristina Zambiazzi
- Mato Grosso do Sul - Maisa Krüger
- Minas Gerais - Iara Maria R. Azevedo Coelho
- Pará - Karla Braga Albuquerque
- Paraíba - Isabela Marinho da Nóbrega
- Paraná - Grazielli Soares Massafera
- Pernambuco - Amanda H. Nolasco Cavalcanti
- Piauí - Shênia Laiane Magalhães de Oliveira
- Rio de Janeiro - Anelise Gomes Sobral
- Rio Grande do Norte - Suzana Schott da Silveira
- Rio Grande do Sul - Fabiane Tesche Niclotti †
- Rondônia - Luana Najara Aben Athar Silva
- Roraima - Catarina de Lima Guerra
- Santa Catarina - Célia Renata da Silva
- São Paulo - Mayra Bernava Simões
- Sergipe - Juliana Melo Soares Silva
- Tocantins - Fânia Marielle Teixeira
