= Miss Brazil 2018 =

- Date: 26 May 2018
- Presenters: Cássio Reis; Maria Eugênia Suconic
- Entertainment: Dream Team do Passinho; Fernanda Abreu
- Venue: Riocentro, Rio de Janeiro, Brazil
- Broadcaster: Band
- Entrants: 27
- Placements: 15
- Winner: Mayra Dias; Amazonas

Miss Brazil 2018 (Portuguese: Miss Brasil 2018), officially Miss Brazil Be Emotion 2018 (Portuguese: Miss Brasil Be Emotion 2018) was the 64th edition of the Miss Brazil pageant, held the at Riocentro in Rio de Janeiro, Brazil, on 26 May 2018.

Monalysa Alcântara of Piauí crowned her Mayra Dias of Amazonas as her successor at the end of the event. Dias represented Brazil at the Miss Universe 2018 pageant and placed in the top twenty.

== Results ==
=== Placements ===
Placement	Contestant
Miss Brazil 2018	Amazonas – Mayra Dias
1st Runner-Up	Bahia – Maria Isabel Santos
2nd Runner-Up	Ceará – Teresa Santos
Top 5	Alagoas – Isabella Burgui; Santa Catarina – Débora Silva
Top 10	Goiás – Giovanna Veríssimo; Pernambuco – Eslovênia Marques; Piauí – Naiely Lima; Rio Grande do Norte – Monique Rêgo; São Paulo – Paula Palhares
Top 15	Distrito Federal – Biah Rodrigues; Espírito Santo – Sabrina Stock; Minas Gerais – Elís Miele; Paraíba – Ana Carla Medeiros; Rio Grande do Sul – Leonora Weimer

== Contestants ==
State	Contestant	Age	Height	Hometown	Placement	Notes
(Acre (state)) Acre	Thaís Braga	22	1.77 m (5 ft 9 1/2 in)	Feijó		
Alagoas	Isabella Burgui	24	1.77 m (5 ft 9 1/2 in)	Maceió	Top 5	
Amapá	Emilay Muniz	20	1.69 m (5 ft 6 1/2 in)	Macapá		Took over the title following the resignation of Williene Lima on 9 May 2018 due to health issues.
(Amazonas (Brazilian state)) Amazonas	Mayra Dias	26	1.75 m (5 ft 9 in)	Itacoatiara	Miss Brazil 2018	
Bahia	Maria Isabel Santos	19	1.75 m (5 ft 9 in)	Salvador	1st Runner-Up	
Ceará	Teresa Santos	19	1.72 m (5 ft 7 1/2 in)	Groaíras	2nd Runner-Up	Later Miss Universo Ceará 2021 and Miss Universo Brazil 2021
Espírito Santo	Sabrina Stock	20	1.78 m (5 ft 10 in)	Marechal Floriano	Top 15	
(Federal District (Brazil)) Federal District	Biah Rodrigues	21	1.71 m (5 ft 7 1/2 in)	Asa Norte	Top 15	
Goiás	Giovanna Veríssimo	23	1.74 m (5 ft 8 1/2 in)	Goiânia	Top 10	
Maranhão	Lorena Bessani	25	1.72 m (5 ft 7 1/2 in)	Barreirinhas		
Mato Grosso	Caroline Back	18	1.84 m (6 ft 1/2 in)	Alta Floresta		
Mato Grosso do Sul	Giovanna Grigolli	20	1.74 m (5 ft 8 1/2 in)	Três Lagoas		
Minas Gerais	Elís Miele	19	1.76 m (5 ft 9 1/2 in)	Ipatinga	Top 15	Later Miss Espírito Santo CNB 2019 and Miss Brazil CNB 2019. Later competed at Miss World 2019 and placed in the Top 5 winning the Miss World Americas Continental title.
Pará	Ponnyk Torres	26	1.76 m (5 ft 9 1/2 in)	Marabá		
Paraíba	Ana Carla Medeiros	21	1.73 m (5 ft 8 in)	Campina Grande	Top 15	
(Paraná (state)) Paraná	Deise Caroline Ribas	21	1.76 m (5 ft 9 1/2 in)	Rio Branco do Sul		
Pernambuco	Eslovênia Marques	21	1.77 m (5 ft 9 1/2 in)	Caruaru	Top 10	
Piauí	Naiely Lima	18	1.82 m (5 ft 11 1/2 in)	Piripiri	Top 10	
(Rio de Janeiro (state)) Rio de Janeiro	Amanda Coelho	19	1.73 m (5 ft 8 in)	Angra dos Reis		
Rio Grande do Norte	Monique Sandrelly Rêgo	24	1.78 m (5 ft 10 in)	Riacho da Cruz	Top 10	
Rio Grande do Sul	Leonora Weimer	27	1.73 m (5 ft 8 in)	Eldorado do Sul	Top 15	
Rondônia	Thaisi Dias	20	1.65 m (5 ft 5 in)	Porto Velho		
Roraima	Marina Pimentel	23	1.75 m (5 ft 9 in)	Boa Vista		
(Santa Catarina (state)) Santa Catarina	Débora Silva	23	1.73 m (5 ft 8 in)	Rio Negrinho	Top 5	
(São Paulo (state)) São Paulo	Paula Palhares	18	1.72 m (5 ft 7 1/2 in)	Sumaré	Top 10	
Sergipe	Grazielly Moraes	19	1.73 m (5 ft 8 in)	Boquim		
Tocantins	Tatiele Rodrigues	19	1.68 m (5 ft 6 in)	Porto Nacional		

== Judges ==
=== Preliminary ===
- Karina Ades – Miss Brazil National director
- Sergio Baia – Photographer
- Juliana Rakoza – Makeup artist
- Monalysa Alcântara – Miss Brazil 2017 from Piauí

=== Finals ===
- Mariana Goldfarb – Model and presenter
- Amaury Jr. – Presenter
- Natália Guimarães – Miss Brasil 2007 from Minas Gerais
- Gianne Albertoni – Actress
- Carlos Tufvesson – Stylist
- Amir Slama – Stylist
- Felipe Veloso – Stylist
- Heloísa Pinheiro – Businesswoman and presenter
- Carla Vilhena – Journalist
- Heloisa Tolipan – Journalist
- Daniela Pessoa – Journalist
- Kenia Maria – UN Women Ambassador
