= Miss Minas Gerais =

Brazilian beauty contest

Miss Minas Gerais Miss Universe Minas Gerais
- Formation: 1955
- Type: Beauty pageant
- Headquarters: Minas Gerais, Brazil
- Members: Miss Brazil
- Official language: Portuguese
- State Director: Sebastião Costa

Miss Minas Gerais is a Brazilian beauty pageant which selects the representative for the State of Minas Gerais at the Miss Brazil contest. The pageant was created in 1955 and has been held every year since with the exception of 1990–1991, 1993, and 2020. The pageant is held annually with representation of several municipalities. Since 2025, the State director for Miss Minas Gerais is Sebastião Costa. Minas Gerais has won nine crowns in the national contest.

The following women have represented Minas Gerais in the national contest and won:

- Staël Maria da Rocha Abelha, from Caratinga, in 1961
- Eliane Parreira Guimarães, from Mariana, in 1971
- Suzana Araújo dos Santos, from Ipatinga, in 1978
- Marisa Fully Coelho, from Manhumirim, in 1983
- Renata Bessa Soares, from Contagem, in 1995
- Nayla Fernanda Afonso Micherif, from Ubá, in 1997
- Natália Guimarães, from Belo Horizonte, in 2007
- Débora Lyra, from Divinópolis, in 2010
- Júlia do Vale Horta, from Juiz de Fora, in 2019

== Gallery of Titleholders ==
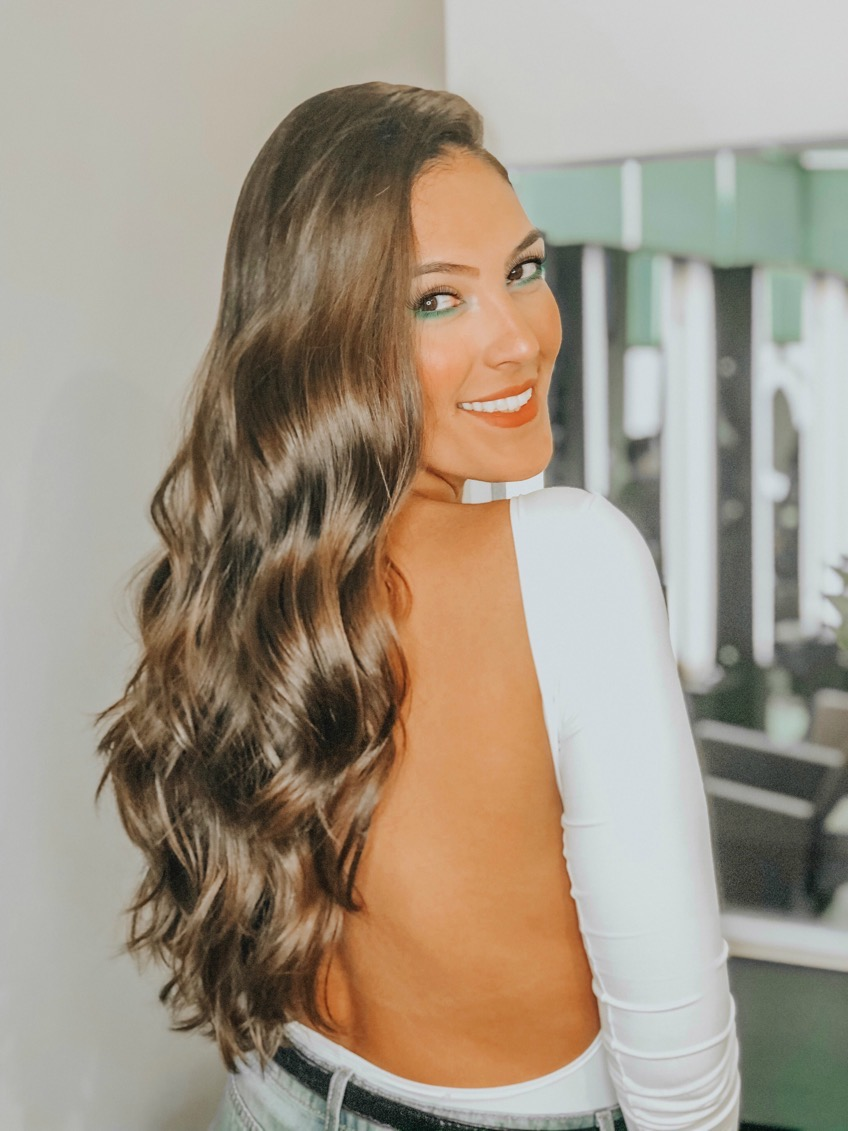
Miss Minas Gerais 2012
Thiessa Sickert

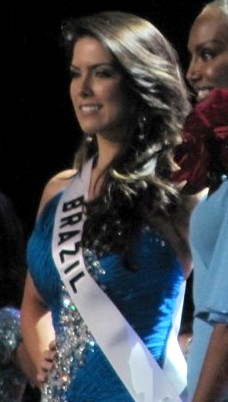
Miss Minas Gerais 2010, and Miss Brazil 2010
Débora Lyra

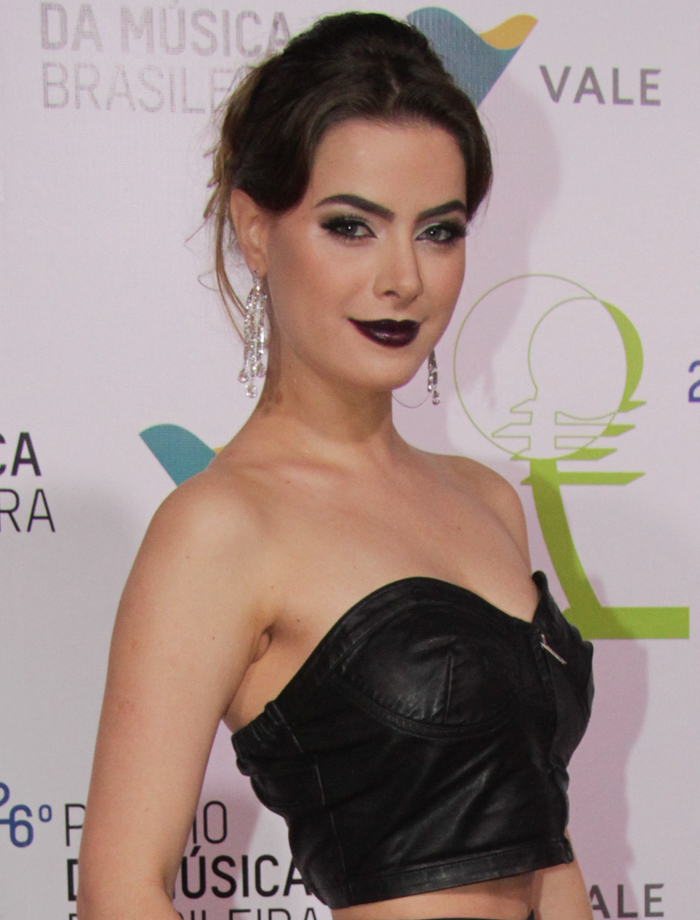
Miss Minas Gerais 2009
Rayanne Fernanda de Morais

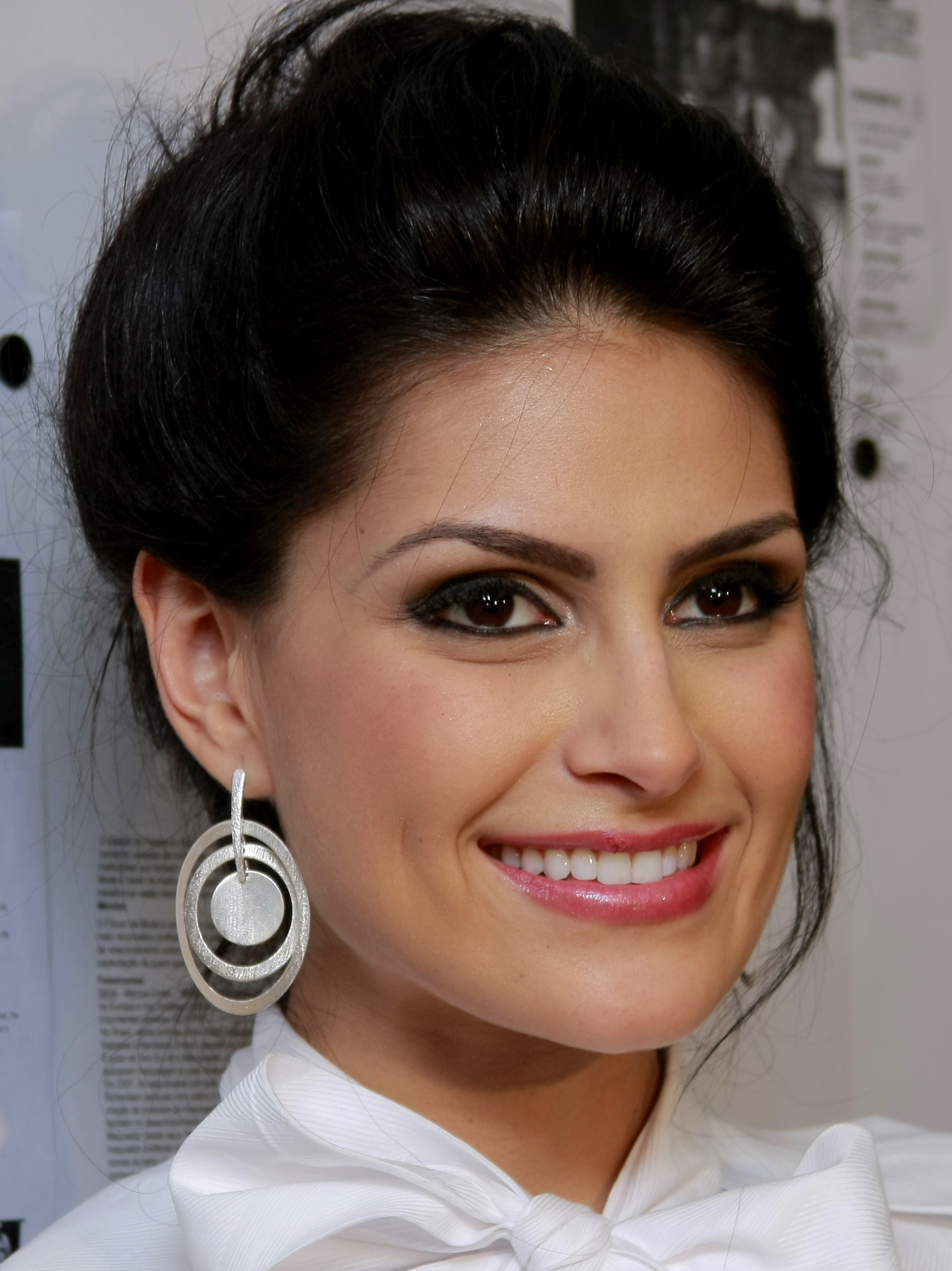
Miss Minas Gerais 2007, and Miss Brazil 2007
Natália Guimarães

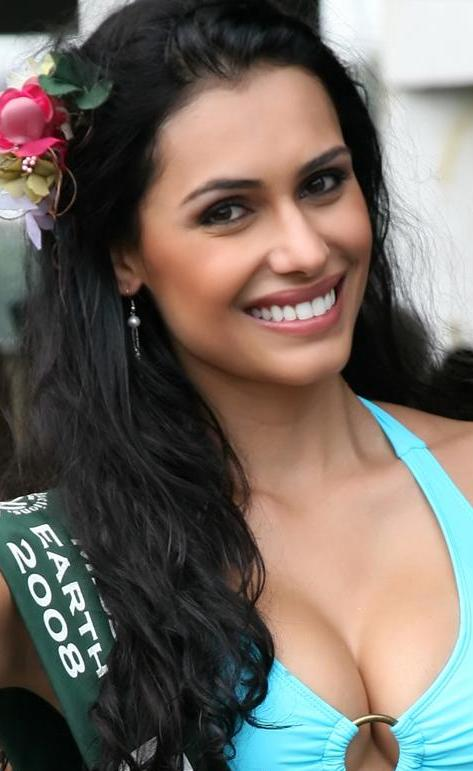
Miss Minas Gerais 2005
Tatiane Kelen Barbosa Alves

== Results summary ==
=== Placements ===
- Miss Brazil: Staël Maria da Rocha Abelha (1961); Eliane Parreira Guimarães (1971); Suzana Araújo dos Santos (1978); Marisa Fully Coelho (1983); Renata Bessa Soares (1995); Nayla Fernanda Afonso Micherif (1997); Natália Guimarães (2007); Débora Lyra (2010); Júlia do Vale Horta (2019)
- 1st Runner-Up: Maria Dorotéia Antunes (1957); Ângela Stecca (1968); Fernanda Tinti Borja Pinto (2001); Iara Coelho Jereissati (2004); Rayanne Fernanda de Morais (2009); Janaína Barcelos (2013)
- 2nd Runner-Up: Denise Guimarães Prado (1958); Berenice Lunardi (1965); Florence Gambogi Alvarenga (1973); Kátia Viana da Costa (1987); Lara Lúcia Fonseca (1988); Débora Patrícia Forlin (1994); Alessandra Ferreira do Nascimento (1999); Thiessa Sickert (2012); Isadora Murta Valente (2022)
- 3rd Runner-Up: Mercedes von Glehn (1960); Virgínia Barbosa de Souza (1966); Mônica Teixeira Cortês (1982)
- 4th Runner-Up: Vânia Beatriz Diniz Gotlib (1959); Silvânia da Silva Lisboa (1975); Rejane Luiz da Silva Thomé (1979); Fernanda Soares dos Santos (2000); Tatiane Kelen Barbosa Alves (2005); Marina de Oliveira Marques (2008)
- Top 5/Top 7/Top 8/Top 9: Marília de Dirceu (1964); Juliana Garcia (1967); Ana Maria Fajardo Côrtes (1969); Marilúcia Fernandes Malaquias (1970); Hilma Terezinha Nascimento (1972); Marly de Fátima Silva Alves (1974); Karla Rezende Habib (1976); Lucy Fernandes Chaves (1977); Tatiana Gonçalves (2024)
- Top 10/Top 11/Top 12: Mônica Tanus Paixão (1980); Carla Emerich de Oliveira (1981); Margareth Penna Corradi (1985); Marília Sales Nogueira (1986); Beatriz Alvarenga (1989); Daniela Oliveira Bottrel (1996); Rafaella Tinti Borja Pinto (2003); Marcela de Almeida Carvalho (2006); Stéfhanie Zanelli (2015); Paloma Marques (2016); Isadora Murta Valente (2021)
- Top 14/Top 15/Top 16: Izabela Drumond (2011); Elís Miele Coelho (2018); Victória Ananda Weitzel Martínez (2025)

=== Special awards ===
- Miss Congeniality: Vânia Beatriz Diniz Gotlib (1959); Virgínia Barbosa de Souza (1966)
- Miss Popular Vote: Rayanne Fernanda de Morais (2009); Stéfhanie Zanelli (2015); Júlia do Vale Horta (2019)
- Best State Costume: Rayanne Fernanda de Morais (2009); Débora Lyra (2010)

== Titleholders ==
Year	Name	Age (Note: Ages at the time of the pageant)	Height	Represented	Miss Brazil placement	Notes
Miss Universe Minas Gerais
2026	Laíssa Ferreira de Sousa	24	1.68 m (5 ft 6 in)	Varjão de Minas	TBD	Born in Brasília.
2025	Victória Ananda Weitzel Martínez	31		Uberaba	Top 14	Previously 1st Runner-Up at Miss Minas Gerais Be Emotion 2017.
2024	Tatiana Gonçalves	26	1.72 m (5 ft 7 1/2 in)	Patos de Minas	Top 7	
2024	Daniela Oliveira			Juiz de Fora	Did not compete	Disqualified due to conflicts over her Brazilian citizenship.
2023	Isadora Lúcia Souza	21	1.73 m (5 ft 8 in)	Ouro Preto		
2022	Isadora Murta Valente	24	1.71 m (5 ft 7 1/2 in)	Contagem	2nd Runner-Up	Previously Miss Universe Minas Gerais 2021 and Top 10 at Miss Brazil 2021.
2021	Isadora Murta Valente	23	1.71 m (5 ft 7 1/2 in)	Contagem	Top 10	Later Miss Universe Minas Gerais 2022 and 2nd Runner-Up at Miss Brazil 2022.
U Miss Minas Gerais 2020 and Miss Minas Gerais Be Emotion 2020
2020	No national Miss Brazil contest due to the COVID-19 pandemic and change in the national franchise holder which caused the national titleholder to be appointed.					
Miss Minas Gerais Be Emotion
2019	Júlia do Vale Horta	24	1.72 m (5 ft 7 1/2 in)	Juiz de Fora	Miss Brazil 2019	Top 20 at Miss Universe 2019. Previously Miss Minas Gerais Mundo/CNB 2015, Top 10 at Miss Brazil World 2015, and 2nd Runner-Up at Miss Brazil CNB 2017. Last Miss Miss Minas Gerais Be Emotion
2018	Elís Miele Coelho	19	1.78 m (5 ft 10 in)	Ipatinga	Top 15	Later Miss Espírito Santo CNB 2019 and Miss Brazil CNB 2019. Top 5 and Miss World Americas at Miss World 2019.
2017	Jéssica Porto	25	1.78 m (5 ft 10 in)	Ituiutaba		
2016	Paloma Marques	21	1.77 m (5 ft 9 1/2 in)	Senador Firmino	Top 10	
2015	Stéfhanie Zanelli	25	1.73 m (5 ft 8 in)	Ubá	Top 10	
Miss Minas Gerais Universe
2014	Karen Porfiro	23	1.74 m (5 ft 8 1/2 in)	Timóteo		Later crowned Miss São Paulo Be Emotion 2017 and competed at Miss Brazil 2017.
2013	Janaína Barcelos	24	1.77 m (5 ft 9 1/2 in)	Betim	1st Runner-Up	Previously Miss São Paulo 2008 and 3rd Runner-Up at Miss Brazil 2008. Also 1st Runner-Up at Miss São Paulo 2007.
2012	Thiessa Sickert	19	1.80 m (5 ft 11 in)	Uberaba	2nd Runner-Up	Later Miss Brazil Earth 2015.
Miss Minas Gerais
2011	Izabela Drumond			Belo Horizonte	Top 15	
2010	Débora Lyra	23	1.80 m (5 ft 11 in)	Divinópolis	Miss Brazil 2010	Unplaced at Miss Universe 2010.
2009	Rayanne Fernanda de Morais	20	1.74 m (5 ft 8 1/2 in)	Divinópolis	1st Runner-Up; Miss Brazil International 2009	Top 15 at Miss International 2009. Later Miss Rio de Janeiro 2012 and Top 10 at Miss Brazil 2012.
2008	Marina de Oliveira Marques	19		Nova Lima	4th Runner-Up	
2007	Natália Guimarães	22	1.75 m (5 ft 9 in)	Belo Horizonte	Miss Brazil 2007	
2006	Marcela de Almeida Carvalho			Ervália	Top 10	
2005	Tatiane Kelen Barbosa Alves			Conselheiro Lafaiete	4th Runner-Up	Later Miss Brazil Earth 2008.
2004	Iara Coelho Jereissati			Luz	1st Runner-Up; Miss Brazil World 2004	Unplaced at Miss World 2004.
2003	Rafaella Tinti Borja Pinto			Ouro Preto	Top 10	
2002	Tâmara Raíssa Ribeiro			Pouso Alegre		
2001	Fernanda Tinti Borja Pinto			Esmeraldas	1st Runner-Up; Miss Brazil International 2001	Top 15 at Miss International 2001.
2000	Fernanda Soares dos Santos			Santo Antônio do Monte	4th Runner-Up	
1999	Alessandra Ferreira do Nascimento			Frutal	2nd Runner-Up; Miss Brazil International 1999	Top 15 at Miss International 1999.
1998	Camila Piva Barbosa			Patos de Minas		
1997	Nayla Fernanda Afonso Micherif	21	1.80 m (5 ft 11 in)	Ubá	Miss Brazil 1997	Unplaced at Miss Universe 1997. Co-National Director of Miss Brazil from 2005 to 2011.
1996	Daniela Oliveira Bottrel			Formiga	Top 12	
1995	Renata Bessa Soares	18	1.71 m (5 ft 7 1/2 in)	Contagem	Miss Brazil 1995	Unplaced at Miss Universe 1995.
1994	Débora Patrícia Forlin			Contagem	2nd Runner-Up	
1993	No delegate sent in 1993 due to Miss Brazil 1993 being appointed rather than having a contest.					
1992	Aliani de Paiva			Sete Lagoas		
1991	No delegate sent in 1991.					
1990	No contest in 1990.					
1989	Beatriz Alvarenga			São João Nepomuceno	Top 12	
1988	Lara Lúcia Fonseca			Patos de Minas	2nd Runner-Up	
1987	Kátia Viana da Costa			João Monlevade	2nd Runner-Up	
1986	Marília Sales Nogueira			Barbacena	Top 12	
1985	Margareth Penna Corradi			Itaúna	Top 12	
1984	Lêda Maria Hubinger			Passos		
1983	Marisa Fully Coelho	21	1.73 m (5 ft 8 in)	Manhumirim	Miss Brazil 1983	Unplaced at Miss Universe 1983.
1982	Mônica Teixeira Cortês			Além Paraíba	3rd Runner-Up	
1981	Carla Emerich de Oliveira			Lavras	Top 12	
1980	Mônica Tanus Paixão			Manhumirim	Top 10	
1979	Rejane Luiz da Silva Thomé			Carangola	4th Runner-Up	
1978	Suzana Araújo dos Santos	20	1.75 m (5 ft 9 in)	Ipatinga	Miss Brazil 1978	Unplaced at Miss Universe 1978.
1977	Lucy Fernandes Chaves			Itajubá	Top 8	
1976	Karla Rezende Habib			Governador Valadares	Top 8	
1975	Silvânia da Silva Lisboa			Belo Horizonte	4th Runner-Up	
1974	Marly de Fátima Silva Alves			Montes Claros	Top 8	
1973	Florence Gambogi Alvarenga			Campo Belo	2nd Runner-Up; Miss Brazil World 1973	Top 15 at Miss World 1973.
1972	Hilma Terezinha Nascimento			Ibiá	Top 8	
1971	Eliane Parreira Guimarães	21	1.80 m (5 ft 11 in)	Mariana	Miss Brazil 1971	4th Runner-Up at Miss Universe 1971.
1970	Marilúcia Fernandes Malaquias			Araguari	Top 8	
1969	Ana Maria Fajardo Côrtes			Além Paraíba	Top 8	
1968	Ângela Stecca			Uberlândia	1st Runner-Up; Miss Brazil World 1968	Unplaced at Miss World 1968.
1967	Juliana Garcia			Cataguases	Top 8	
1966	Virgínia Barbosa de Souza			Montes Claros	3rd Runner-Up; Miss Brazil International 1967	Top 15 at Miss International 1967
1965	Berenice Lunardi			Belo Horizonte	2nd Runner-Up; Miss Brazil World 1965	Unplaced at Miss World 1965.
1964	Marília de Dirceu			Divinópolis	Top 9	
1963	Edna Saraiva			Carlos Chagas		
1962	Sílvia Mary Mileo			Belo Horizonte		
1961	Staël Maria da Rocha Abelha	19	1.70 m (5 ft 7 in)	Caratinga	Miss Brazil 1961	
1960	Mercedes von Glehn			Lavras	3rd Runner-Up	
1959	Vânia Beatriz Diniz Gotlib			Belo Horizonte	4th Runner-Up	
1958	Denise Guimarães Prado			Belo Horizonte	2nd Runner-Up	
1957	Maria Dorotéia Antunes			Juiz de Fora	1st Runner-Up	
1956	Anelice Kjær Jacob			Varginha		
1955	Maria Aparecida Benz			Governador Valadares		
1954	No delegate sent in 1954 as the contest didn't exist until 1955.					
