= Teresa Santos =

Brazilian beauty pageant titleholder, Miss Brazil 2021 winner

- Born: Teresa Stela Barbosa Silva Santos; June 9, 1998 (age 28); Fortaleza, Ceará, Brazil
- Height: 1.72 m (5 ft 7 1/2 in)
- Spouse: Gabriel Emrich (m. 2026)
- Beauty pageant titleholder
- Title: Miss Brazil 2021
- Hair color: Blonde
- Eye color: Blue
- Major competitions: Miss Brazil 2018; (2nd Runner-Up); Miss Brazil 2021; (Winner); Miss Universe 2021; (Unplaced)

Teresa Stela Barbosa Silva Santos (born June 9, 1998) is a Brazilian model and beauty pageant titleholder who was crowned Miss Brazil 2021. She represented Brazil at Miss Universe 2021. Santos had previously been crowned Miss Ceará 2021 and Miss Ceará 2018, and placed as the second runner-up at Miss Brazil 2018. She is the fourth woman from Ceará to win Miss Brazil.

== Early life and education ==
Teresa Stela Barbosa Silva Santos was born in Fortaleza, the capital of Ceará, and has family roots in Bahia. Shortly after her birth, the family moved to the municipality of Maranguape, where Santos was raised.

== Pageantry ==
=== Miss Ceará ===
Santos began her pageantry career in 2018, after competing in Miss Ceará 2018. At the time of the competition, Santos had no pageantry experience and little idea of what to expect. She represented Groaíras in the pageant and ultimately won the title, which qualified her to compete in Miss Brazil 2018. Miss Brazil 2018 was later held on 26 May 2018 at Riocentro in Rio de Janeiro. In the competition, Santos advanced to the Top 15, Top 10, Top 5, and ultimately placed as the second runner-up, behind winner Mayra Dias of Amazonas.

After Miss Brazil 2018, Santos took a hiatus from pageantry. She later returned in 2021, as a contestant in Miss Ceará 2021. Santos ultimately went on to win the title, becoming a two-time state titleholder in Ceará.

=== Miss Brazil 2021 ===
As Miss Ceará 2021, Santos became qualified to compete in Miss Brazil 2021. The competition was set to be the inaugural edition of the new Miss Universe Brazil competition, under new leadership. The final was filmed on 7 November 2021, aboard the cruise ship the MSC Preziosa. In the competition, Santos advanced to the Top 15, Top 10, Top 5, and Top 3; as the final was set to air two days after filming, the crowning moments of all of the three finalists were filmed, while only the winner's would be included in the telecast. On 9 November, the finale aired which revealed Santos had been crowned the winner, making her the fourth woman from Ceará to win the title.

As Miss Brazil 2021, Santos represented Brazil at Miss Universe 2021 where she failed to place in the semifinals, effectively ending Brazil’s ten year streak of consecutive placements in Miss Universe, from 2011 through 2020.

== Personal life ==
Santos married businessman Gabriel Emrich in May 2026 in Florence, Italy.

Awards and achievements
Preceded by Aléxia Duarte	Miss Ceará; 2018	Succeeded by Luana Lobo
Preceded by Luana Lobo	Miss Ceará; 2021	Incumbent
Preceded by (Rio Grande do Sul) Julia Gama	Miss Brazil; 2021	Succeeded by (Espírito Santo) Mia Mamede
