= Miss São Paulo =

Miss São Paulo Miss Universe São Paulo
- Formation: 1954
- Type: Beauty pageant
- Headquarters: São Paulo State, Brazil
- Members: Miss Brazil
- Official language: Portuguese
- State Directors: Renata Vilani and Samuel Teixeira

Miss São Paulo, also referred to as Miss Estado de São Paulo, is a Brazilian Beauty pageant which selects the representative for the State of São Paulo at the Miss Brazil contest. The pageant was created in 1954 and has been held every year since with the exception of 1990, 1993, and 2020. The pageant is held annually with representation of several municipalities. Since 2024, the State directors for Miss São Paulo are Renata Vilani and Samuel Teixeira. São Paulo has won eight crowns in the national contest.

The following women have competed as Miss São Paulo in the national contest and won:

- Carmen Sílvia de Barros Ramasco, from Campinas, in 1967
- Sandra Mara Ferreira, from Sorocaba, in 1973
- Sandra Guimarães, from Ribeirão Preto, in 1974
- Kátia Celestina Moretto, from Sorocaba, in 1976
- Cássia Janys Moraes Silveira, from Indaiatuba, in 1977
- Ana Elisa Flores da Cruz, in 1984
- Patrícia Godói, from São Carlos, in 1991
- Valéria Péris, from Campinas, in 1994

== Gallery of Titleholders ==
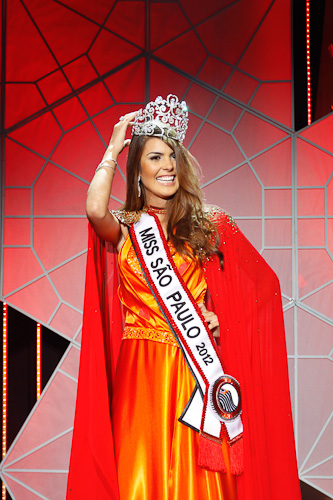
Miss São Paulo 2012
Francine Pantaleão

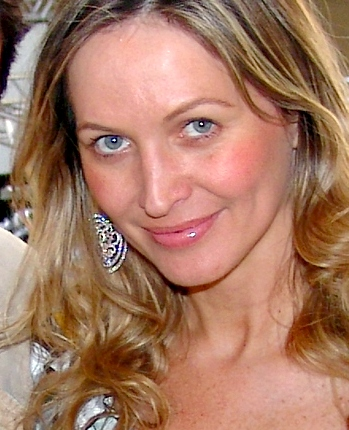
Miss São Paulo 1989
Adriana Conceição Colin

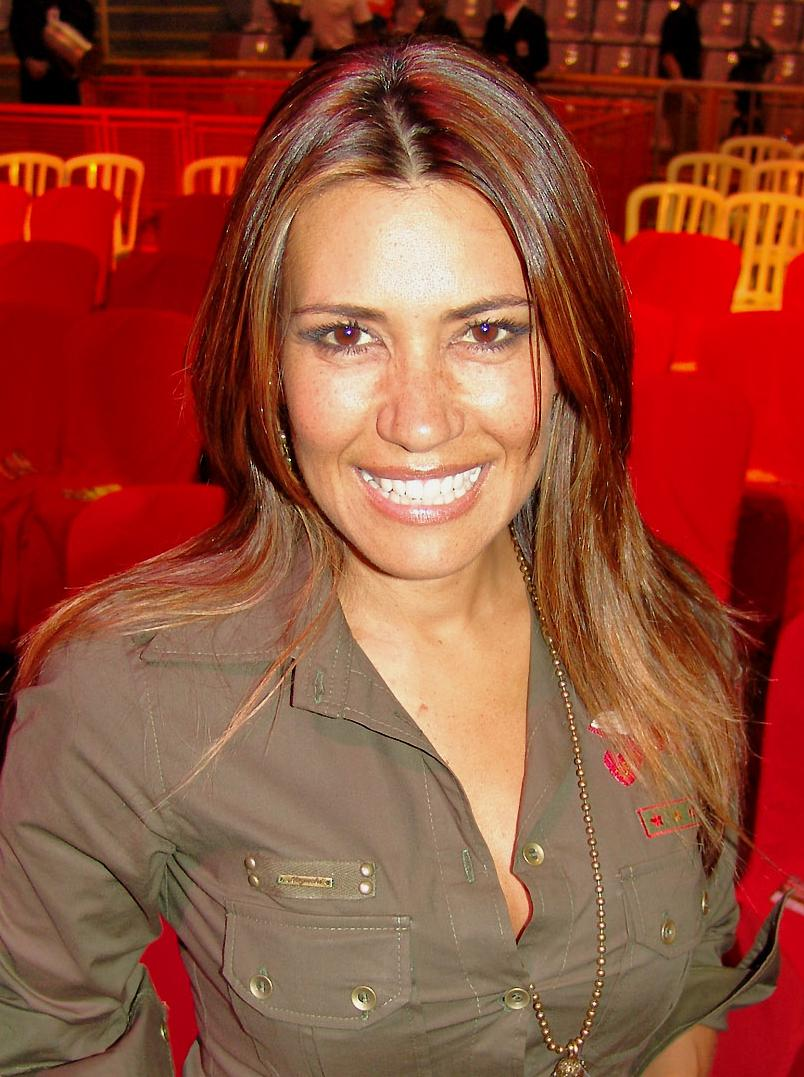
Miss São Paulo 1982
Solange Hochgreb Frazão

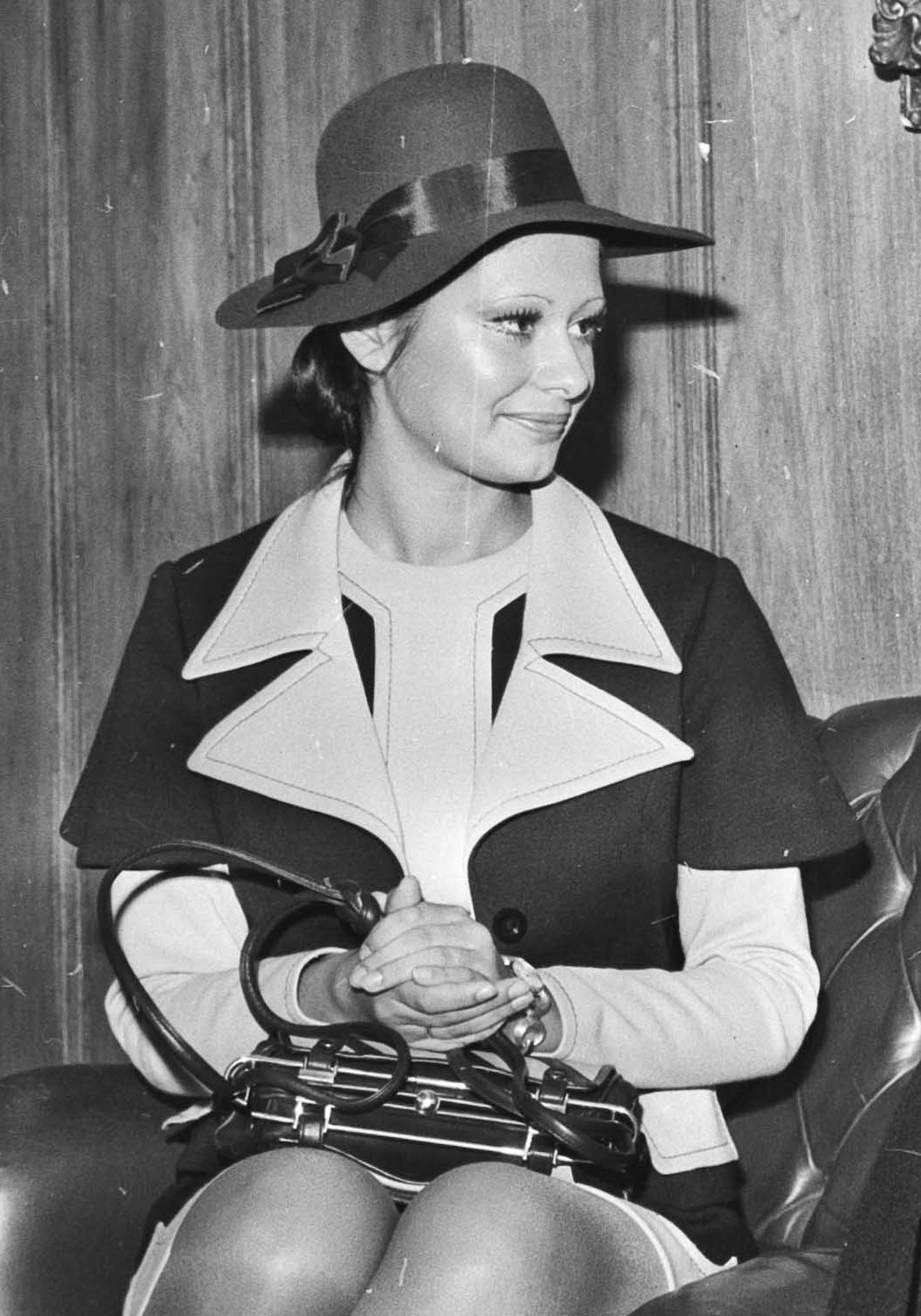
Miss São Paulo 1973, and Miss Brazil 1973
Sandra Mara Ferreira

== Results summary ==
=== Placements ===
- Miss Brazil: Carmen Sílvia de Barros Ramasco (1967); Sandra Mara Ferreira (1973); Sandra Guimarães (1974); Kátia Celestina Moretto (1976); Cássia Janys Moraes Silveira (1977); Ana Elisa Flores da Cruz (1984); Patrícia Godói (1991); Valéria Péris (1994)
- 1st Runner-Up: Ethel Chiaroni (1955); Regina Maura (1956); Julieta Strausz (1962); Sandra Penno Rosa (1965); Maria Lúcia Alexandrino dos Santos (1969); Sônia Yara Guerra (1970); Ângela Maria Favi (1972); Fernanda Bôscolo de Camargo (1980); Solange Hochgreb Frazão (1982); Solange Correia (1986); Adriana Conceição Colin (1989); Fernanda Leme (2014)
- 2nd Runner-Up: Léa Sílvia Dall'Acqua (1979); Anamaria Starck (1985); Joyce Yara Silva Aguiar (2001); Jéssica Voltolini (2015); Bianca Lopes (2019); Vitória Brodt (2023)
- 3rd Runner-Up: Janaína Barcelos (2008); Rafaela Gomes Butareli (2011); Bianca Lopes (2021)
- 4th Runner-Up: Madalena Fagotti (1958); Terezinha Rodrigues (1959); Dirce Augustus (1963); Célia Carvalho (1971); Karin Villen Baum (1987); Camila Freitas (1997); Juliana Volpini (2003); Sabrina Rhoden (2007)
- Top 5/Top 7/Top 8/Top 9: Érika Zirkus (1960); Tânia Zattar (1966); Mariluce Facci (1968); Márcia Carneiro (1975); Flávia Machado (1992); Francine Pantaleão (2012); Bruna Michels (2013)
- Top 10/Top 11/Top 12/Top 13: Ana Lúcia Netto (1978); Renata Bernstorff (1981); Jimena Carmelo (1983); Dalcilene Galani (1988); Luiara Fiedler (1995); Daniela Zanotello (1996); Daniela Polido (1998); Melissa Coelho (1999); Vanessa Martins (2000); Issa Oliveira (2002); Glenda Saccomano (2005); Sabrina Paiva (2016); Paula Palhares (2018); Milla Vieira (2024)
- Top 14/Top 15/Top 16: Sílvia Novais (2009); Karla Mandro (2010); Adrielle Pieve (2022); Karoline Aline de Morais Daniel (2025)

=== Special awards ===
- Miss Congeniality:
- Miss Photogenic: Valéria Péris (1994)
- Best State Costume:
- Miss Popular Vote: Glenda Saccomano (2005); Francine Pantaleão (2012)
- Best Interview: Milla Vieira (2024)

== Titleholders ==
| Year | Name | Age (Note: Ages at the time of the pageant) | Height | Represented | Miss Brazil placement | Notes |
Miss Universe São Paulo
| 2026 | Giovanna Figlie | 22 | 1.78 m (5 ft 10 in) | Itu | TBD | |
| 2025 | Karoline Aline de Morais Daniel | 34 | 1.65 m (5 ft 5 in) | Guarulhos | Top 14 | |
| 2024 | Milla Vieira | 33 | 1.78 m (5 ft 10 in) | São Bernardo do Campo | Top 13 | Also won Best Interview at Miss Brazil. |
| 2023 | Vitória Zenobini Brodt | 24 | 1.72 m (5 ft 7 1/2 in) | Campinas | 2nd Runner-Up | Born in Porto Alegre. |
| 2022 | Adrielle Pieve de Castro | 26 | 1.74 m (5 ft 8 1/2 in) | São Paulo City | Top 16 | Was only appointed to represent São Paulo State at Miss Brazil and not as the actual titleholder herself. |
| 2022 | Ana Flávia Alves de Souza | | | Amparo | Did not compete | Was the 1st Runner-Up at Miss Universe São Paulo 2021. Became the official titleholder for Miss Universe São Paulo 2022 and assumed the duties of Miss Universe São Paulo after last years winner retained the title due to the representative for São Paulo State was appointed and not the actual titleholder herself with the official duties remaining with last years winner until she resigned. As a result, Souza assumed the duties of Miss Universe São Paulo and became the official titleholder for Miss Universe São Paulo 2022. |
| 2021 | Bianca Lopes | 24 | 1.68 m (5 ft 6 in) | Jaú | 3rd Runner-Up | Previously Miss São Paulo Be Emotion 2019 and 2nd Runner-Up at Miss Brazil 2019. Because the 2022 representative was appointed only to represent São Paulo State at Miss Brazil and not the actual titleholder herself, Lopes continued in her duties and retained her title for until January 2023 when she resigned. |
U Miss São Paulo 2020 and Miss São Paulo Be Emotion 2020
| 2020 | No national Miss Brazil contest due to the COVID-19 pandemic and change in the national franchise holder which caused the national titleholder to be appointed. | | | | | |
Miss São Paulo Be Emotion
| 2019 | Bianca Lopes | 22 | 1.68 m (5 ft 6 in) | Jaú | 2nd Runner-Up | Later won Miss Universe São Paulo 2021 and 3rd Runner-Up at Miss Brazil 2021. Last Miss Miss São Paulo Be Emotion |
| 2018 | Paula Palhares | 18 | 1.72 m (5 ft 7 1/2 in) | Sumaré | Top 10 | |
| 2017 | Karen Porfiro | 26 | 1.74 m (5 ft 8 1/2 in) | São Paulo City | | Previously Miss Minas Gerais Universe 2014 and competed in Miss Brazil 2014. |
| 2016 | Sabrina Paiva | 21 | 1.81 m (5 ft 11 1/2 in) | Caconde | Top 10 | |
| 2015 | Jéssica Voltolini Vilela | 22 | 1.81 m (5 ft 11 1/2 in) | Ribeirão Preto | 2nd Runner-Up | |
Miss São Paulo Universe
| 2014 | Fernanda Leme | 22 | 1.82 m (5 ft 11 1/2 in) | Ribeirão Preto | 1st Runner-Up | |
| 2013 | Bruna Michels | 24 | 1.75 m (5 ft 9 in) | Diadema | Top 5 | |
| 2012 | Francine Pantaleão | 23 | 1.79 m (5 ft 10 1/2 in) | Jaú | Top 5 | Also won Miss Popular Vote at Miss Brazil. |
Miss São Paulo
| 2011 | Rafaela Gomes Butareli | 22 | | Marília | 3rd Runner-Up | Later became Miss Brazil International 2012 and Top 15 at Miss International 2012. |
| 2010 | Karla Mandro | 24 | | Piracicaba | Top 15 | |
| 2009 | Sílvia Novais | 22 | | Campinas | Top 15 | |
| 2008 | Janaína Barcelos | 19 | 1.78 m (5 ft 10 in) | Caieiras | 3rd Runner-Up | Previously 1st Runner-Up at Miss São Paulo 2007. Later Miss Minas Gerais Universe 2013 and 1st Runner-Up at Miss Brazil 2013. |
| 2007 | Sabrina Rhoden | | | Barueri | 4th Runner-Up | |
| 2006 | Nicole Bernardes | 20 | 1.75 m (5 ft 9 in) | Taubaté | | |
| 2005 | Glenda Saccomano | | 1.86 m (6 ft 1 in) | Sorocaba | Top 10 | Also won Miss Popular Vote at Miss Brazil. |
| 2004 | Mayra Simões | | | Dracena | | |
| 2003 | Juliana Volpini | | | São José do Rio Preto | 4th Runner-Up | |
| 2002 | Issa Oliveira | | | Cajobi | Top 10 | |
| 2001 | Joyce Yara Silva Aguiar | | | Votuporanga | 2nd Runner-Up | Later won Miss São Paulo Mundo 2001 and Miss Brazil World 2001. Competed in Miss World 2001. |
| 2000 | Vanessa Martins | | | São Paulo City | Top 11 | |
| 1999 | Melissa Coelho | | | Santo André | Top 10 | |
| 1998 | Daniela Polido | | | São Paulo City | Top 12 | |
| 1997 | Camila Freitas | | | Votuporanga | 4th Runner-Up | |
| 1996 | Daniela Zanotello | | | Indaiatuba | Top 12 | |
| 1995 | Luiara Fiedler | | | Rio Claro | Top 10 | |
| 1994 | Valéria Péris | 23 | 1.76 m (5 ft 9 1/2 in) | Campinas | Miss Brazil 1994 | Also won Miss Photogenic at Miss Brazil. Unplaced at Miss Universe 1994. |
| 1993 | No delegate sent in 1993 due to Miss Brazil 1993 being appointed rather than having a contest. | | | | | |
| 1992 | Flávia Machado | | | Sorocaba | Top 5 | |
| 1991 | Patrícia Godói | 20 | 1.80 m (5 ft 11 in) | São Carlos | Miss Brazil 1991 | Unplaced at Miss Universe 1991. |
| 1990 | No contest in 1990. | | | | | |
| 1989 | Adriana Conceição Colin | | | São Carlos | 1st Runner-Up | |
| 1988 | Dalcilene Galani | | | São Bernardo do Campo | Top 12 | |
| 1987 | Karin Villen Baum | | | São Miguel Paulista | 4th Runner-Up | |
| 1986 | Solange Correia | | | Sociedade Esportiva Palmeiras | 1st Runner-Up | |
| 1985 | Anamaria Starck | | | São Vicente | 2nd Runner-Up | |
| 1984 | Ana Elisa Flores da Cruz | 18 | 1.76 m (5 ft 9 1/2 in) | Horto Florestal de São Paulo | Miss Brazil 1984 | Unplaced at Miss Universe 1984. |
| 1983 | Jimena Carmelo | | | Sorocaba | Top 12 | |
| 1982 | Solange Hochgreb Frazão | | | São José dos Campos | 1st Runner-Up | |
| 1981 | Renata Bernstorff | | | São Vicente | Top 12 | |
| 1980 | Fernanda Bôscolo de Camargo | | | Santos | 1st Runner-Up; Miss Brazil International 1980 | Unplaced at Miss International 1980. |
| 1979 | Léa Sílvia Dall'Acqua | | | Guarani Futebol Clube | 2nd Runner-Up; Miss Brazil World 1979 | Top 7 at Miss World 1979. |
| 1978 | Ana Lúcia Netto | | | Esporte Clube São Bento | Top 10 | |
| 1977 | Cássia Janys Moraes Silveira | 21 | 1.75 m (5 ft 9 in) | Indaiatuba | Miss Brazil 1977 | Unplaced at Miss Universe 1977. |
| 1976 | Kátia Celestina Moretto | 18 | 1.78 m (5 ft 10 in) | Sorocaba | Miss Brazil 1976 | Unplaced at Miss Universe 1976. |
| 1975 | Márcia Carneiro | | | São Paulo City | Top 8 | |
| 1974 | Sandra Guimarães | 18 | 1.72 m (5 ft 7 1/2 in) | Ribeirão Preto | Miss Brazil 1974 | Unplaced at Miss Universe 1974. |
| 1973 | Sandra Mara Ferreira | 21 | 1.77 m (5 ft 9 1/2 in) | Sorocaba | Miss Brazil 1973 | Top 12 at Miss Universe 1973. |
| 1972 | Ângela Maria Favi | | | Araçatuba | 1st Runner-Up; Miss Brazil World 1972 | Unplaced at Miss World 1972. |
| 1971 | Célia Carvalho | | | Sorocaba | 4th Runner-Up | |
| 1970 | Sônia Yara Guerra | | | Campinas | 1st Runner-Up; Miss Brazil World 1970 | Top 7 at Miss World 1970. |
| 1969 | Maria Lúcia Alexandrino dos Santos | | | Lins | 1st Runner-Up; Miss Brazil International 1969 | Top 15 at Miss International 1969. |
| 1968 | Mariluce Facci | | | Catanduva | Top 8 | |
| 1967 | Carmen Sílvia de Barros Ramasco | 21 | 1.73 m (5 ft 8 in) | Campinas | Miss Brazil 1967 (later quit) | Top 15 at Miss Universe 1967. Later quit and broke her Miss Brazil contract by getting married during her reign. Ramasco did this due to what she alleged was bad organization and disrespect along with delayed delivery of her some of her prize winnings along with, in some cases, no delivery of her prize winnings. As a result, the 1st Runner-Up of that years Miss Brazil contest, Wilza de Oliveira Rainato of Paraná, became Miss Brazil. |
| 1966 | Tânia Zattar | | | Clube de Campo do Castelo | Top 8 | |
| 1965 | Sandra Penno Rosa | | | Instituto Caetano de Campos | 1st Runner-Up; Miss Brazil International 1965 | 4th Runner-Up at Miss International 1965. |
| 1964 | Cecília Alves | | | Associação dos Fotógrafos de São Paulo | | |
| 1963 | Dirce Augustus | | | Associação dos Fotógrafos de São Paulo | 4th Runner-Up | |
| 1962 | Julieta Strausz | | | Círculo Esportivo Israelita | 1st Runner-Up; Miss Brazil International 1962 | Unplaced at Miss International 1962. |
| 1961 | Ana Maria Filatro | | | Light - Serviços de Electricidade S/A | | |
| 1960 | Érika Zirkus | | | Clube de Campo do Vale do Paraíba | Top 8 | |
| 1959 | Terezinha Rodrigues | | | São Paulo City | 4th Runner-Up | |
| 1958 | Madalena Fagotti | | | Campinas | 4th Runner-Up | |
| 1957 | Lúcia Carvalho | | | São Paulo City | | |
| 1956 | Regina Maura | | | Itapira | 1st Runner-Up | |
| 1955 | Ethel Chiaroni | | | Esporte Clube Floresta | 1st Runner-Up | |
| 1954 | Baby Lomani | | | Clube dos Artistas de São Paulo | | |
