= Miss Brazil World 2001 =

Beauty pageant

- Date: September 28, 2001
- Venue: Shopping Guararapes, Jaboatão dos Guararapes, Pernambuco, Brazil
- Broadcaster: Central Nacional de Televisão
- Entrants: 27
- Placements: 10
- Winner: Joyce Yara Silva Aguiar; São Paulo

The Miss Brazil World 2001 pageant took place on September 28, 2001. It was 16th edition of the contest. Each state and the Federal District competed for their state and went to compete for the title of the Brazilian Crown for Miss World. The winner entered Miss World 2001. This year was the first time that Miss Brazil World was separated from the main pageant, Miss Brazil, for only 1 year. Joyce Yara Silva Aguiar of São Paulo ended being the winner at the end of the contest and also the first black woman to be Miss Brazil World. This contest was held separate from Miss Brazil 2001 and was apart from the latter for only a year before rejoining with the main contest the following year.

== Results ==
Final results	Contestant
Miss Brazil World 2001	São Paulo - Joyce Yara Silva Aguiar
1st Runner-up	Pernambuco - Débora Daggy
2nd Runner-up	Goiás - Lara Brito
Top 10	Amazonas - Vivian Cavalcanti; Bahia - Oldeane da Fonsêca; Minas Gerais - Andréia de Paula; Paraíba - Sásckya Sabrynna Porto; Paraná - Ana Carla de Godoy; Rio de Janeiro - Raquel Faria; Santa Catarina - Simone Régis

== Delegates ==
The delegates for Miss Brazil World 2001 were:

- Acre - Joyce Áudria de Oliveira Garcia de Lazaris
- Alagoas - Lívia Regina Costa Tavares
- Amapá - Jakeline Almeida Amanajás
- Amazonas - Vivian Cristina Rodrigues Cavalcanti
- Bahia - Oldeane Ribeiro da Fonseca
- Ceará - Fernanda de Souza Lourenço
- Distrito Federal - Vanusa Aparecida de Paula
- Espírito Santo - Ineri Lidig
- Goiás - Lara Andressa de Brito
- Maranhão - Michele Cristine de Paula
- Mato Grosso - Cristina Ramos Lago
- Mato Grosso do Sul - Fernanda Friolli Pinto
- Minas Gerais - Andréia de Paula Moreira Brito
- Pará - Ana Paula da Silva Lessa
- Paraíba - Sásckya Sabrynna Almeida Porto
- Paraná - Ana Carla de Godoy
- Pernambuco - Débora Michelle de Araújo Daggy
- Piauí - Juceline de Souza Nóbrega
- Rio de Janeiro - Raquel Santos de Faria
- Rio Grande do Norte - Suzana Schott da Silveira
- Rio Grande do Sul - Nathália Urdini
- Rondônia - Elizângela Alves do Nascimento
- Roraima - Anna Carolina de Paula
- Santa Catarina - Simone Régis
- São Paulo - Joyce Yara Silva Aguiar
- Sergipe - Karina da Costa Barreto
- Tocantins - Nathália Lourenço Rodrigues
