= Júlia Horta =

Brazilian model and beauty queen

- Beauty pageant titleholder
- Title: Miss Brasil 2019
- Major competitions: Miss Brasil 2019 (Winner); Miss Universe 2019 (Top 20)

Júlia do Vale Horta is a Brazilian model and beauty pageant titleholder who was crowned Miss Brasil 2019. She represented Brazil at the Miss Universe 2019 pageant, where she placed in the top 20.

== Career ==
=== Miss Brasil 2019 ===
In 2019, Júlia represented the state of Minas Gerais at the national beauty pageant, Miss Brasil 2019 which was held on March 9, 2019, at São Paulo Expo Exhibition & Convention Center in the city of São Paulo, Brazil. At the end of the event, Julia was crowned as Miss Brasil 2019 by the outgoing titleholder Mayra Dias.

=== Miss Universe 2019 ===
Júlia represented Brazil in the Miss Universe 2019 pageant where she placed in the top 20.

Awards and achievements
Preceded by Mayra Dias	Miss Brasil; 2019	Succeeded by (Rio Grande do Sul) Julia Gama
Preceded by Elís Miele	Miss Minas Gerais; 2019	Succeeded by Isadora Murta
Preceded by Thainá Magalhães	Miss Tourism International Brazil; 2017	Succeeded by Gabrielli Frozza
Preceded by Vitória Bisognin	Rainha Brasileira do Café; 2016	Succeeded by Francielly Ouriques
Preceded by Eduarda D'Avila	Miss Minas Gerais CNB; 2015	Succeeded by Mariana Vieira
