= Mayra Dias =

Brazilian model who is Miss Brasil 2018

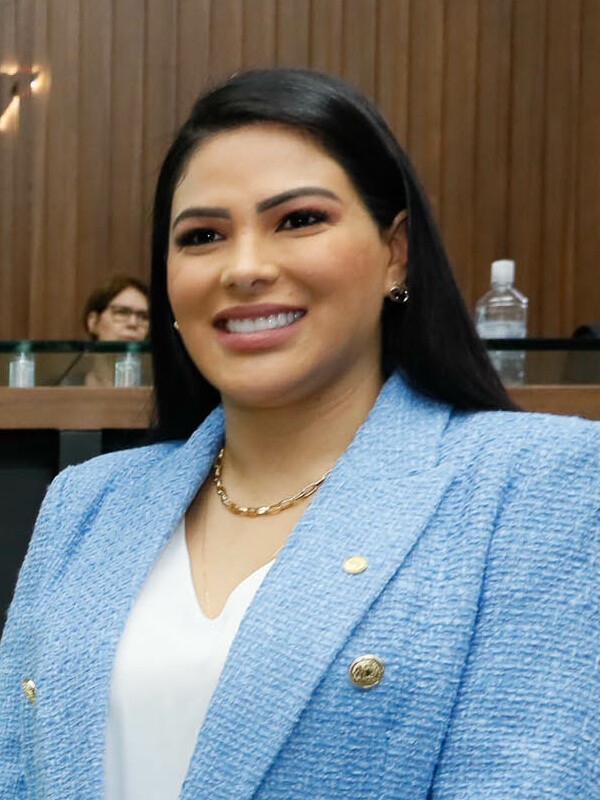
- Dias in 2023

State Deputy of Amazonas
- Incumbent
- Assumed office 1 February 2023

Personal details
- Born: Mayra Benita Alves Dias; 28 September 1991 (age 35) Itacoatiara, Amazonas, Brazil
- Party: Avante
- Spouse: Frank Bi Garcia (m. 2019)
- Children: 2
- Education: UniNorte Manaus
- Height: 1.75 m (5 ft 9 in)
- Beauty pageant titleholder
- Title: Miss Amazonas 2018; Miss Brasil 2018
- Hair color: Black
- Eye color: Brown
- Major competitions: Miss Mundo Brasil 2015 (Top 20); Reina Hispanoamericana 2016 (1st Runner-Up); Miss Brasil 2018 (Winner); Miss Universe 2018 (Top 20)

Mayra Benita Alves Dias (born 28 September 1991) is a Brazilian politician, journalist, model, and beauty pageant titleholder. She was crowned Miss Brasil 2018 on 26 May 2018, becoming the second representative from Amazonas. She represented Brazil at the Miss Universe 2018, where she finished as a Top 20 semifinalist.

In 2022, she was elected for state deputy of Amazonas by Avante.

== Early life ==
Dias was born in Itacoatiara, a city in the interior of the state of Amazonas. She has Indigenous ancestry.

== Career ==
=== Miss Mundo Amazonas 2015 ===
Dias was crowned Miss Mundo Amazonas 2015 and competed at the Miss Mundo Brasil 2015 in Florianópolis.

=== Miss Mundo Brasil 2015 ===
Dias will represent Amazonas at the Miss Mundo Brasil 2015 at the Teatro Governador Pedro Ivo in Florianópolis in the state of Santa Catarina but she placed in the Top 20 semifinalist.

=== Reina Hispanoamericana 2016 ===
Dias was joined and chosen as Brazilian Representative at Reina Hispanoamericana 2016 at the FexpoCruz, Santa Cruz, Bolivia on 5 November 2016 defeating 22 other beauties competing for the title where she ended as the 1st Runner-Up. It was Camila Soleibe from Colombia who eventually won the title Reina Hispanoamericana 2016.

=== Miss Brasil 2018 ===
Dias representing Amazonas was crowned Miss Brasil 2018 held at the Riocentro in Rio de Janeiro its grand finale on 26 May 2018 where 27 beautiful divas competed for the national title. She succeeded outgoing Miss Brasil 2017 Monalysa Alcântara.

=== Miss Universe 2018 ===
Dias represented Brazil at the Miss Universe 2018 pageant in Bangkok, Thailand, where she placed in the top 20.

Awards and achievements
Preceded by (Piauí) Monalysa Alcântara	Miss Universo Brasil; 2018	Succeeded by (Minas Gerais) Júlia Horta
Preceded by Juliana Soares	Miss Amazonas; 2018	Succeeded by Lorena Alencar
Preceded by (Venezuela) Karielys Cuadros Rodríguez	Reina Hispanoamericana 1st Runner-Up; 2016	Succeeded by (Brazil) Lais Berté
Preceded by Larissa Dienstmann	Miss Brasil Hispanoamericana; 2016	Succeeded by Lais Berté
Preceded by Hanna Weiser	Miss Mundo Amazonas; 2015	Succeeded by Tayana Maia
