= Miss Brazil CNB 2017 =

- Date: August 12, 2017
- Presenters: Livia Nepomuceno; Juliano Crema; Alessandro Boia; Tamara Almeida
- Entertainment: Patricio Arellano; Renata Sena
- Venue: Hotel do Bosque, Angra dos Reis, Rio de Janeiro, Brazil
- Broadcaster: Rede Brasil
- Entrants: 42
- Placements: 20
- Winner: Gabrielle Vilela; Rio de Janeiro
- Congeniality: Carolina Schüler (Santa Catarina (state)) Jurerê Internacional
- Photogenic: Caroline Gross; Fernando de Noronha

Miss Brazil CNB 2017 was the 28th edition of the Miss Brazil CNB pageant and the 3rd under CNB Miss Brazil. The contest took place on August 12, 2017. Each state, the Federal District and various Insular Regions & Cities competed for the title. Beatrice Fontoura of Goiás crowned her successor, Gabrielle Vilela of Rio de Janeiro at the end of the contest. Vilela represented Brazil at Miss World 2017. The contest was held at the Hotel do Bosque in Angra dos Reis, Rio de Janeiro, Brazil.

== Results ==
| Final results | Contestant |
|---|---|
| Miss Brazil CNB 2017 | Rio de Janeiro - Gabrielle Vilela |
| 1st Runner-up (Vice-Miss Brazil CNB 2017) | Mato Grosso - Bárbara Reis |
| 2nd Runner-up (1st Princess) | (Minas Gerais) Zona da Mata - Júlia Horta |
| Top 6 | São Paulo - Daniele Arruda (2nd Princess); Greater São Paulo - Marcella Marques (3rd Princess); Brasília - Anna Lyssa Valim (4th Princess) |
| Top 12 | Espírito Santo - Letícia Salles; (Rio Grande do Sul) Ilha dos Lobos - Amanda Brenner; Minas Gerais - Lorena Rodrigues; Pará - Emanuelle Costa; Paraíba - Rhayanny Nóbrega; São Paulo Capital - Dara Costa |
| Top 20 | Circuito das Águas - Fernanda Oliveira; Greater Porto Alegre - Jéssica Aguiar; Ilhabela - Thalita Xavier; (Santa Catarina (state)) Jurerê Internacional - Carolina Schüler; Mato Grosso do Sul - Ana Carla Marques; (Mato Grosso do Sul) Pantanal Sul-Mato-Grossense - Yara Volpe; Santa Catarina - Camilla Wolf; Sergipe - Bárbara Monick |

=== Regional Queens of Beauty ===
| Award | Winner |
|---|---|
| Miss Midwest | Mato Grosso - Bárbara Reis |
| Miss North | Pará - Emanuelle Costa |
| Miss Northeast | Paraíba - Rhayanny Nóbrega |
| Miss South | (Rio Grande do Sul) Ilha dos Lobos - Amanda Brenner |
| Miss Southeast | (Minas Gerais) Zona da Mata - Júlia Horta |

=== Special awards ===
| Award | Winner |
|---|---|
| Best Dress | Pará - Emanuelle Costa |
| Best Skin | São Paulo - Daniele Arruda |
| Miss Congeniality | (Santa Catarina (state)) Jurerê Internacional - Carolina Schüler |
| Miss Cordiality | Mato Grosso - Bárbara Reis |
| Miss Elegance | Mato Grosso - Bárbara Reis |
| Miss Health and Fitness | Espírito Santo - Letícia Salles |
| Miss Livi Training | Espírito Santo - Letícia Salles |
| Miss Photogenic | Fernando de Noronha - Caroline Gross |
| 40th Revelation Model | Mato Grosso - Bárbara Reis |

== Challenge Events ==
=== Beauty with a Purpose ===
| Final results | Contestant |
|---|---|
| Winner (Tie) | Rio de Janeiro - Gabrielle Vilela; São Paulo - Daniele Arruda |
| Top 5 | (Mato Grosso) Pantanal (MT) - Natalia Rodrigues; Paraíba - Rhayanny Nóbrega; (Minas Gerais) Zona da Mata - Júlia Horta |

=== Beauty & Photography ===
| Final results | Contestant |
|---|---|
| Winner | Mato Grosso - Bárbara Reis |
| 1st Runner-Up | São Paulo - Daniele Arruda |
| 2nd Runner-Up | Espírito Santo - Letícia Salles |

=== Best in Interview ===
| Final results | Contestant |
|---|---|
| Winner | (Minas Gerais) Zona da Mata - Júlia Horta |
| 1st Runner-Up | Mato Grosso - Bárbara Reis |
| 2nd Runner-Up | Brasília - Anna Lyssa Valim |

=== Fantasy & Creativity ===
| Final results | Contestant |
|---|---|
| Winner | Greater Porto Alegre - Jéssica Aguiar |
| 1st Runner-Up | Pará - Emanuelle Costa |
| 2nd Runner-Up | Paraíba - Rhayanny Nóbrega |

=== Miss Popularity ===
| Final results | Contestant |
|---|---|
| Winner | Santa Catarina - Camilla Wolf |
| 1st Runner-Up | Espírito Santo - Letícia Salles |
| 2nd Runner-Up | Vale do Aporé - Flávia Modesto |

=== Miss Talent ===
| Final results | Contestant |
|---|---|
| Winner | Circuito das Águas - Fernanda Oliveira |
| 1st Runner-Up | São Paulo - Daniele Arruda |
| 2nd Runner-Up | (Minas Gerais) Zona da Mata - Júlia Horta |

=== Miss Top Model ===
| Final results | Contestant |
|---|---|
| Winner | Mato Grosso - Bárbara Reis |
| 1st Runner-Up | Espírito Santo - Letícia Salles |
| 2nd Runner-Up | (Minas Gerais) Zona da Mata - Júlia Horta |

=== Night Fashion ===
| Final results | Contestant |
|---|---|
| Winner | Mato Grosso - Bárbara Reis |
| 1st Runner-Up | Espírito Santo - Letícia Salles |
| 2nd Runner-Up | (Minas Gerais) Zona da Mata - Júlia Horta |

== Delegates ==
The delegates for Miss Brazil CNB 2017 were:

=== States ===
- Alagoas - Caroline Andrade
- Bahia - Emili Seixas
- Ceará - Renata Miranda
- Espírito Santo - Letícia Salles
- Goiás - Ingrid Coelho
- Maranhão - Clara Aguiar
- Mato Grosso - Bárbara Reis
- Mato Grosso do Sul - Ana Carla Marques
- Minas Gerais - Lorena Rodrigues
- Pará - Emanuelle Costa
- Paraíba - Rhayanny Nóbrega
- Paraná - Bruna Nogueira
- Pernambuco - Viviane Félix
- Piauí - Melissa Albuquerque
- Rio de Janeiro - Gabrielle Vilela
- Rio Grande do Norte - Clarissa Matias
- Rio Grande do Sul - Daiane Savi
- Rondônia - Suélly Miranda
- Santa Catarina - Camilla Wolf
- São Paulo - Daniele Arruda
- Sergipe - Bárbara Monick

=== Insular Regions and Cities ===
- (Mato Grosso do Sul) Águas de Bonito - Gabriely Paliga
- (Rio Grande do Norte) Atol das Rocas - Lara Vidian
- Brasília - Anna Lyssa Valim
- Circuito das Águas - Fernanda Oliveira
- Fernando de Noronha - Caroline Gross
- Greater Porto Alegre - Jéssica Aguiar
- Greater São Paulo - Marcella Marques
- Ilhabela - Thalita Xavier
- (Rio Grande do Sul) Ilha da Pintada - Monalisa Menezes
- (Rio Grande do Sul) Ilha dos Lobos - Amanda Brenner
- (Mato Grosso) Ilhas do Araguaia - Quetlin Heidrich
- (Santa Catarina (state)) Jurerê Internacional - Carolina Schüler
- (Pará) Marajó - Flávia Lacerda
- (Mato Grosso) Pantanal (MT) - Natalia Rodrigues
- (Mato Grosso do Sul) Pantanal (MS) - Yara Volpe
- Plano Piloto - Thayná Lima
- Rio de Janeiro Capital - Clara Fernandes
- São Paulo Capital - Dara Costa
- Vale do Aporé - Ana Flávia Modesto
- Vale Europeu - Cristiane Busnardo
- (Minas Gerais) Zona da Mata - Júlia Horta

== Notes ==
=== Did not compete ===
- Acre
- Amapá
- Amazonas
- Distrito Federal (competed as Miss Brasília)
- Roraima
- Tocantins
