= Débora Lyra =

Brazilian model

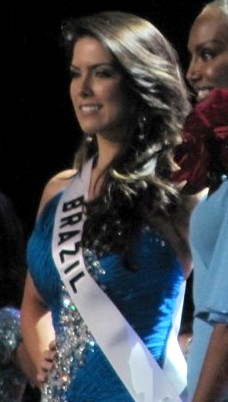
- Born: September 26, 1989 (age 37); Vila Velha, Espírito Santo, Brazil
- Occupations: Student and model
- Height: 1.80 m (5 ft 11 in)
- Beauty pageant titleholder
- Title: Miss Minas Gerais 2010; Miss Brasil 2010
- Hair color: Black
- Eye color: Brown
- Major competitions: Top Model of the World 2008/2009 (Winner); Miss Terra Brasil 2009 (Miss Terra Fogo Brasil); Miss Brasil 2010 (Winner); Miss Universe 2010 (Unplaced); Miss Multiverse 2014

Débora Lyra (born September 26, 1989) is a Brazilian actress, model and beauty pageant titleholder who won the Miss Brasil 2010 and represented her country at Miss Universe 2010, she also worldwide winner of Miss Multiverse in 2014.

== Biography ==
Lyra was born in Vila Velha, but spent two years living in the town of Divinópolis. She was a model since age 8 and had wanted to be Miss Brasil since age 12. With the encouragement of her father, she soon began to participate in and win some beauty contests. She also landed a few modeling jobs, but at 15, she took a break from acting to work in an export company café, where she remained for four years, to help her family pay for their house.

At 18, she met the state coordinator of Minas Gerais, who invited her to live in Divinópolis and prepared to participate in international beauty contests. She visited various countries such as Germany, France, Italy, Spain, Belarus, Czech Republic, United States (where she stayed for three months) and Bahamas.

== Pageantry ==
Lyra won the Miss Minas Gerais 2010 and the Miss Brasil 2010 representing Minas Gerais.

She competed in the Miss Universe 2010 pageant held on August 23, 2010, in Las Vegas, Nevada, U.S., but failed to place.

Before Miss Universe Brazil, Debora competed in Miss Terra Brasil 2009 where she became 3rd runner-up or Miss Terra-Fogo (Miss Earth-Fire).

In 2013, Lyra represented Brazil at the world finals of the Miss Multiverse pageant in the Dominican Republic, she won and became the 4th Miss Multiverse winner.

== Personal life ==
Along with her native language of Portuguese, Débora speaks fluent English and Spanish.

In 2011, she lost her car, money and personal papers during an attack. In an interview with R7.com, days before passing the crown of Miss Brasil 2011 on to her successor, she said that during her year as Miss Brasil, she had bouts of depression.

On December 27, 2011, Débora Lyra was involved in a severe car crash, for which her spleen has been removed and some interventions in her spine where due. Her mother-in-law died in this accident.

Preceded by (Germany) Alessandra Alores	Top Model of the World; 2008/2009	Succeeded by (Colombia) Nina Rodríguez
Preceded by (Rio Grande do Norte) Larissa Costa	Miss Universo Brasil; 2010	Succeeded by (Rio Grande do Sul) Priscila Machado
