= Miss Brazil 2021 =

66th Miss Brazil competition, national beauty pageant edition

- Date: 9 November 2021
- Presenters: Cris Barth
- Venue: MSC Preziosa
- Entrants: 27
- Placements: 15
- Winner: Teresa Santos; Ceará

Miss Brazil 2021 (Portuguese: Miss Brasil 2021), officially Miss Universe Brazil 2021 (Portuguese: Miss Universo Brasil 2021), was the 66th edition of the Miss Brazil pageant, and the first under the new Miss Universe Brazil management. The competition was filmed on 7 November 2021 on board the MSC Preziosa, and aired on 9 November. In order to preserve the secrecy of the results before its airdate, crowning moments for all three finalists were filmed, while only that of the winner was aired.

Teresa Santos of Ceará was crowned as the winner and successor of Julia Gama of Rio Grande do Sul. Gama did not crown Santos as Miss Brazil amidst controversy between herself and the pageant organizers. Santos competed at Miss Universe 2021, but was unplaced.

== Results ==
=== Placements ===
Placements	Contestant
Miss Brazil 2021	Ceará – Teresa Santos
1st Runner-Up	Piauí – Maria Gabriela Lacerda
2nd Runner-Up	Sergipe – Carol Valença
3rd Runner-Up	São Paulo – Bianca Lopes
4th Runner-Up	Amazonas – Rebeca Portilho
Top 10	Espírito Santo – Eduarda Braum; Minas Gerais – Isadora Murta; Roraima – Jéssica Oliveira; Santa Catarina – Bruna Valim; Tocantins – Luciana Gomes
Top 15	Bahia – Tainara Bacc; Distrito Federal – Gabriela Rodrigues; Pernambuco – Millena Vasconcelos; Rio de Janeiro – Mylena Duarte; Rio Grande do Sul – Suellyn Scheffer

== Contestants ==
27 contestants were selected to compete.

State	Contestant	Age (Note: Ages at the time of the pageant)	Hometown	Height	Placement
(Acre (state)) Acre	Juliana Melo	26	Cruzeiro do Sul	1.76 m (5 ft 9 1/2 in)	
Alagoas	Rafaela Barbosa	22	Arapiraca	1.70 m (5 ft 7 in)	
Amapá	Andreina Pereira	23	Santana	1.71 m (5 ft 7 1/2 in)	
(Amazonas (Brazilian state)) Amazonas	Rebeca Portilho	23	Manaus	1.76 m (5 ft 9 1/2 in)	4th Runner-Up
Bahia	Tainara Bacc	25	Cruz das Almas	1.75 m (5 ft 9 in)	Top 15
Ceará	Teresa Santos	23	Maranguape	1.72 m (5 ft 7 1/2 in)	Miss Brazil 2021
(Federal District (Brazil)) Distrito Federal	Gabriela Rodrigues	24	Brasília	1.74 m (5 ft 8 1/2 in)	Top 15
Espírito Santo	Eduarda Braum	23	Afonso Cláudio	1.88 m (6 ft 2 in)	Top 10
Goiás	Elisandra Nunes	22	Caldas Novas	1.73 m (5 ft 8 in)	
Maranhão	Juliana Costa	27	Presidente Dutra	1.78 m (5 ft 10 in)	
Mato Grosso	Gabriela Guimarães	22	Cuiabá	1.74 m (5 ft 8 1/2 in)	
Mato Grosso do Sul	Maria Eduarda Giraldi	18	Dourados	1.77 m (5 ft 9 1/2 in)	
Minas Gerais	Isadora Murta	23	Contagem	1.71 m (5 ft 7 1/2 in)	Top 10
Pará	Larissa Azevedo	21	Marabá	1.72 m (5 ft 7 1/2 in)	
Paraíba	Maria Beatriz Monteiro	22	Patos	1.75 m (5 ft 9 in)	
(Paraná (state)) Paraná	Marcella Kozinski	21	Curitiba	1.75 m (5 ft 9 in)	
Pernambuco	Millena Vasconcelos	24	Sairé	1.75 m (5 ft 9 in)	Top 15
Piauí	Gabriela Lacerda	19	Teresina	1.78 m (5 ft 10 in)	1st Runner-Up
(Rio de Janeiro (state)) Rio de Janeiro	Mylena Duarte	26	Barra Mansa	1.75 m (5 ft 9 in)	Top 15
Rio Grande do Norte	Brenda Pontes	26	Tibau	1.80 m (5 ft 11 in)	
Rio Grande do Sul	Suellyn Scheffer	25	Montenegro	1.73 m (5 ft 8 in)	Top 15
Rondônia	Thaisi Dias	24	Porto Velho	1.65 m (5 ft 5 in)	
Roraima	Jéssica Oliveira	20	Amajari	1.74 m (5 ft 8 1/2 in)	Top 10
(Santa Catarina (state)) Santa Catarina	Bruna Valim	27	Otacílio Costa	1.68 m (5 ft 6 in)	Top 10
(São Paulo (state)) São Paulo	Bianca Lopes	24	Jaú	1.68 m (5 ft 6 in)	3rd Runner-Up
Sergipe	Carol Valença	27	Aracaju	1.72 m (5 ft 7 1/2 in)	2nd Runner-Up
Tocantins	Luciana Gomes	26	Palmas	1.67 m (5 ft 5 1/2 in)	Top 10

== Notes ==
– The 1st runner-up Maria Gabriela Lacerda would go on to be crowned Miss Brazil 2025 on February 13, 2025.
– Top 10 finalist Isadora Murta would go on to be crowned Miss Supranational Brazil 2024 and finished as 3rd runner-up at Miss Supranational 2024 international competition.
– Top 10 finalist Eduarda Braum would go on to be crowned Miss Supranational Brazil 2025 and would win the Miss Supranational 2025 international competition, marking Brazil's first win in the pageant.
– Contestant Marcella Kozinski would go on to be crowned Miss Brazil 2026 on July 25, 2026
