= Miss Brazil =

National beauty pageant competition in Brazil

Organização Miss Brasil
- Type: Beauty pageant
- Headquarters: São Paulo, Brazil
- Qualifies for: Miss Universe
- First edition: 1954; 72 years ago
- Current titleholder: Marcella Kozinski; Paraná
- National director: Rodrigo Ferro
- Language: Portuguese

Miss Brazil (Portuguese: Miss Brasil) is a Brazilian national beauty pageant, held annually since 1954. The competition has gone through several incarnations throughout its history, while its main purpose has been to select the Brazilian representative for the Miss Universe pageant.

== History ==
=== Early years and golden age (1954–1972) ===
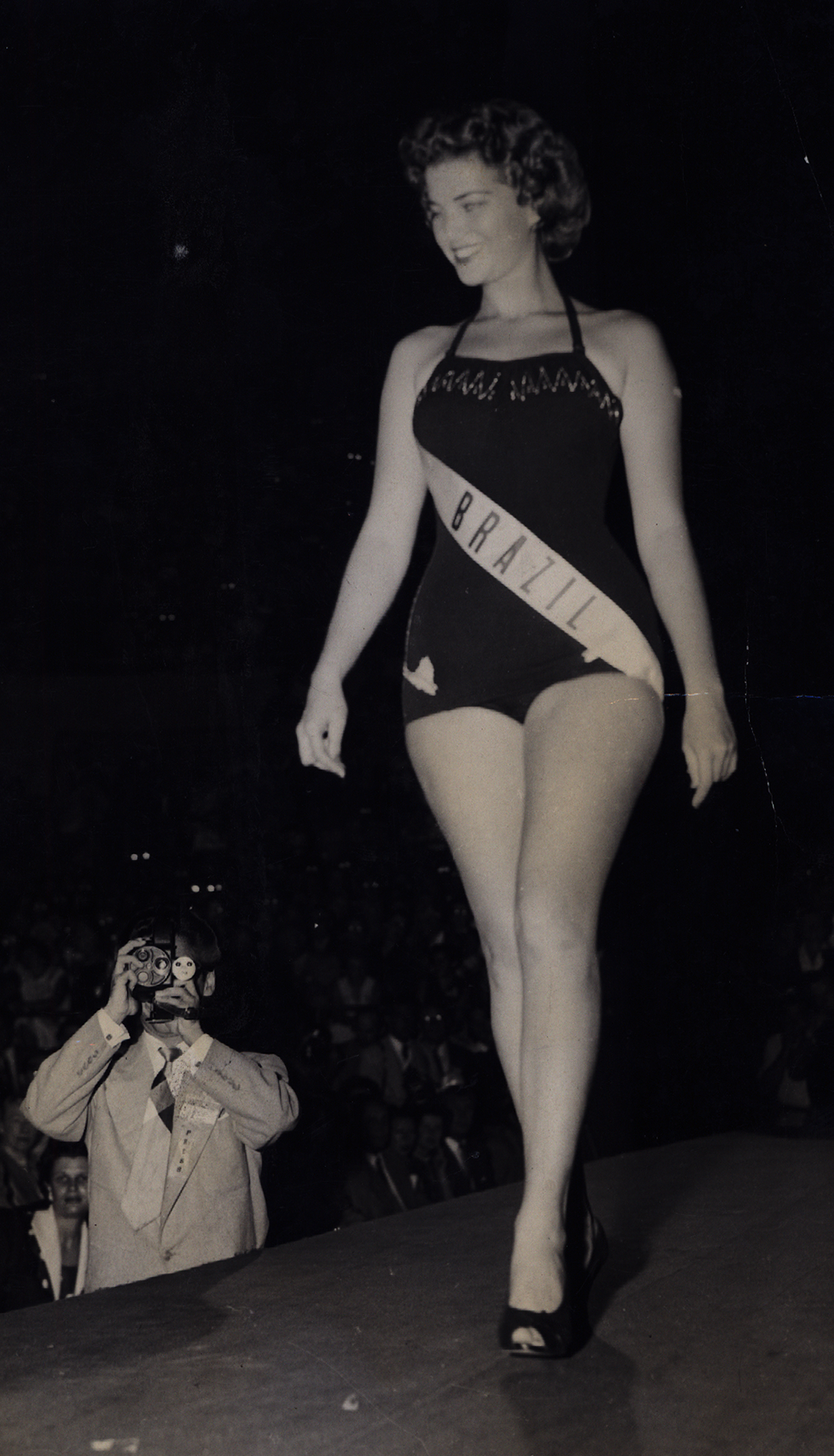
Martha Rocha, Miss Brazil 1954

Since 1900, competitions in the vein of Miss Brazil had existed sporadically throughout the country in a non-consecutive manner. Violeta Lima Castro, crowned Miss Brazil 1900, is sometimes considered the first Miss Brazil, although the records surrounding her being the alleged first winner are inconsistent and some records allege that a different woman was crowned as the first Miss Brazil during the time of the Empire of Brazil in 1865. Overall, evidence supports that eight women had been crowned Miss Brazil in the early years before a Miss Brazil pageant was formally created.

Year	Miss Brazil	State
1900	Violeta Lima Castro	Rio de Janeiro
1912	Noêmia Nabuco de Castro	Rio de Janeiro
1922	Maria José "Zezé" Leone	São Paulo
1929	Olga Bergamini de Sá	Rio de Janeiro
1930	Yolanda Pereira	Rio Grande do Sul
1932	Ieda Telles de Menezes	Rio de Janeiro
1939	Vânia Pinto	Rio de Janeiro
1949	Jussara Marques	Goiás

The Miss Brazil competition was formally created in 1954, and held annually since. Its inaugural edition was held at the Palácio Quitandinha in Petrópolis, and used to select a Brazilian representative for Miss Universe 1954, Brazil's first time competing in Miss Universe. Martha Rocha ultimately won the title, and is thus considered the first formal Miss Brazil winner. Following this inaugural event, Miss Brazil was held annually to elect a woman to represent Brazil at Miss Universe, becoming the first time where a national beauty pageant was held regularly in Brazil. Catalina Swimwear, the founder and main sponsor of Miss Universe, became sponsors of the Miss Brazil competition and provided swimwear for the contestants.

Diários Associados began promoting and broadcasting the competition in 1955, which significantly increased press coverage and recognition of the competition in Brazil, turning it into the second-most watched event on Brazilian television, behind only the matches of the Brazil national football team. Miss Brazil entered its golden age in the 1960s, with Iêda Maria Vargas winning Miss Universe 1963 and Martha Vasconcellos winning Miss Universe 1968, its only wins in the competition. Lúcia Petterle also later was crowned Miss World 1971, making Brazil one of the few countries at the time to have won both of the world's two major international beauty pageants. At the time, the first runner-up of Miss Brazil was nominated to compete at Miss World.

=== Move to Brasília (1973–1980) ===
In 1973, the organizers of Miss Brazil opted to move the pageant from Ginásio do Maracanãzinho in Rio de Janeiro, where it had traditionally been held, to Nilson Nelson Gymnasium in Brasília. This was done for both strategic and political reasons: most connecting flights throughout Brazil stopped in Brasília, Brasília was the location of the headquarters of Diários Associados, and being the federal capital, the president of Brazil could be involved in greeting the contestants.

Following the move of the competition to Brasília, Miss Brazil was faced with a number of problems in regards to viewership and sponsors. The competition began to experience a decrease in popularity, both in television viewers and ticket sales. This problem was exacerbated with the withdrawal of key sponsor Helena Rubinstein Incorporated in 1976. Rede Tupi continued to broadcast Miss Brazil until its bankruptcy in 1980.

=== SBT and continued decline (1981–1999) ===
Following the bankruptcy of Rede Tupi in 1980, Miss Brazil was transferred to Sistema Brasileiro de Televisão (SBT) and its owner Silvio Santos. During this period, Marlene Brito was hired by SBT as the new national director of Miss Brazil, tasked with overseeing day-to-day operations and the preparation of contestants. During the SBT era, Santos became known as the face of Miss Brazil, hosting the pageant every year. However, the competition did not see an uptick in support or viewership, and continued to decline in popularity. In 1990, SBT dropped Miss Brazil from its scheduling due to the continued downturn in viewership.

Following the withdrawal of SBT, Brito opted to leave the network and found her own company to promote Brazilian beauty pageants, called The Most of Brazilian Beauty. Brito organized the national pageants in 1991 and 1992, but due to a lack of sponsorship, was forced to appoint a titleholder instead in 1993. The following year Paulo Max took over the Miss Brazil organization, and after his death in 1996, his children Paulo Max Filho and Ana Paula Sang organized the competition from 1997 until 1999.

=== Gaeta (2000–2011) ===
In 2000, Brazilian event planning company Gaeta Promoções e Eventos took over the duties of organizing Miss Brazil, through a deal that saw the competition broadcast through the CNT Rio de Janeiro local station. In 2002, the competition returned to national television after being transferred to the newly created RedeTV!. The pageant entered into a partnership with Rede Bandeirantes (Band) in 2003, which saw renewed media promotion throughout Brazil. This agreement led to a reemergence of popularity amongst the Brazilian public, with Miss Universe 2003 becoming the most-watched event of the night in Brazil according to the Brazilian Institute of Public Opinion and Statistics (IBOPE).

=== Band (2012–2019) ===
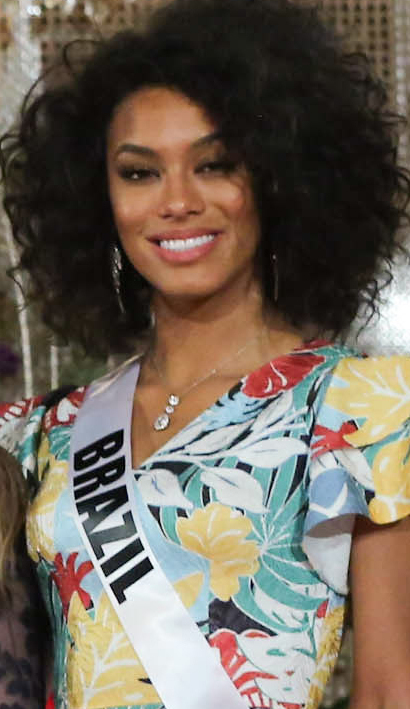
Raissa Santana, Miss Brazil 2016

In 2012, the Brazilian franchise for Miss Universe was awarded entirely to Band, ending their partnership with Gaeta and removing Gaeta from the Brazilian franchise entirely. From 2012 until 2015, the Brazilian media conglomerate Grupo Bandeirantes de Comunicação was responsible for directing the national pageant and selecting candidates from the 27 state pageants.

==== Polishop partnership (2015–2019) ====
In 2015, amidst severe financial hardship, Band entered into an agreement with Brazilian retailer Polishop, under the leadership of Polishop owner João Appolinário. With this agreement, Band was only responsible for the annual broadcast of the competition, with Polishop responsible for all other management and organization. During this time, the competition was renamed to Miss Brasil Be Emotion.

=== Miss Universe Brazil (2020–present) ===
In July 2019, the partnership between Band and Polishop came to an end due to a decrease in interest from the Brazilian public, and the Brazilian press alleged that Brazil would not have a representative at Miss Universe 2020.

In October 2019, Natália Guimarães confirmed that she had news regarding the future of Miss Brazil, and that fans should expect a "new era" for the competition. Band later confirmed that they were not abandoning the Miss Brazil brand, but would be dependent on new sponsorship. In March 2020, it was confirmed that Band's license with the Miss Universe Organization was not renewed.

In July 2020, it was announced that Brazilian businessman Winston Ling had purchased the Brazilian franchise for Miss Universe, and that the competition would be rebranded as U Miss Brazil (later changed to Miss Universe Brazil the following year). In November 2020, Marthina Brandt, a former Miss Brazil winner, was hired as the national director of the newly created competition. The organization appointed a representative to be its inaugural titleholder in 2020, and held its first national pageant in 2021.

== Contestants ==
Each year, contestants are chosen through a series of state pageants held throughout Brazil (the 26 states and the Federal District) in the second half of the year before and the first half of the year before the national competition. Over time, the states represented at Miss Brazil have varied slightly. The following 27 state pageants (the Federal District, Distrito Federal, is counted as a state) currently send contestants to Miss Brazil:

- Miss Acre
- Miss Alagoas
- Miss Amapá
- Miss Amazonas
- Miss Bahia
- Miss Ceará
- Miss Distrito Federal
- Miss Espírito Santo
- Miss Goiás
- Miss Maranhão
- Miss Mato Grosso
- Miss Mato Grosso do Sul
- Miss Minas Gerais
- Miss Pará
- Miss Paraíba
- Miss Paraná
- Miss Pernambuco
- Miss Piauí
- Miss Rio de Janeiro
- Miss Rio Grande do Norte
- Miss Rio Grande do Sul
- Miss Rondônia
- Miss Roraima
- Miss Santa Catarina
- Miss São Paulo
- Miss Sergipe
- Miss Tocantins

The state competitions are organized by state organizations, and contestants must reside or attend school in the state they choose to represent. State Organizations have their own discretion as to how they wish to field candidates for the state contests. Some choose to organize a number of local contests corresponding to cities or municipalities within the state, while others use closed casting processes.

== Recent titleholders ==
Year	Miss Brazil	State	Notes
2026	Marcella Kozinski	Paraná	
2025	Maria Gabriela Lacerda	Piauí	Top 30
2024	Luana Cavalcante	Pernambuco	
2023	Maria Brechane	Rio Grande do Sul	Voice For Change (Top 10)
2022	Mia Mamede	Espírito Santo	
2021	Teresa Santos	Ceará	

=== Gallery ===
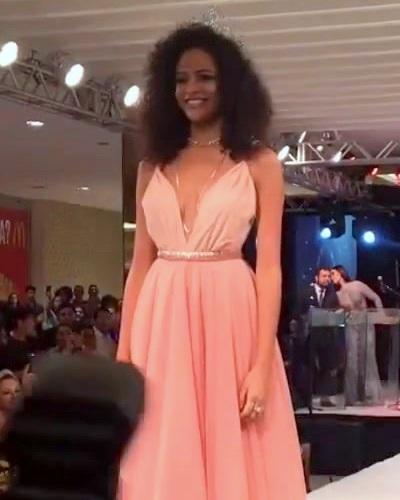
Miss Brazil 2017
Monalysa Alcântara

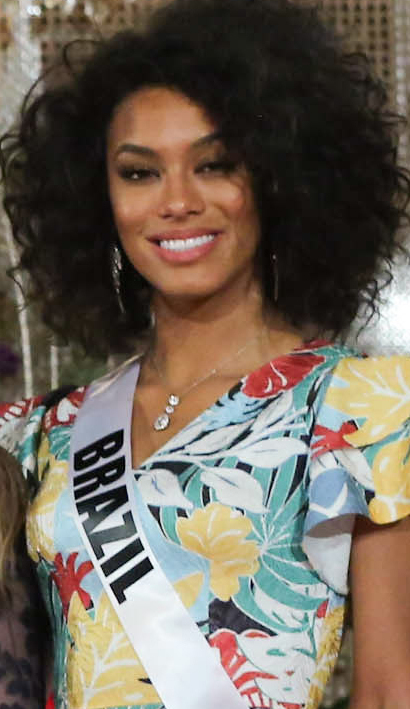
Miss Brazil 2016
Raissa Santana

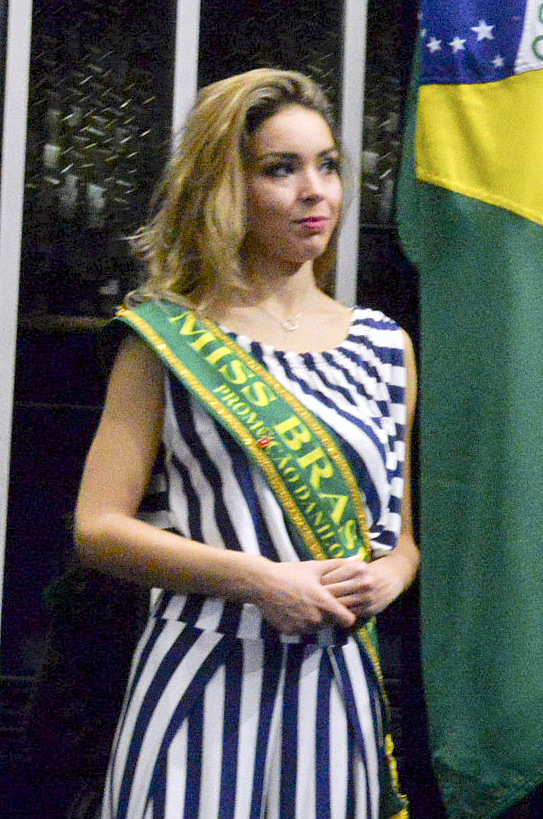
Miss Brazil 2015
Marthina Brandt

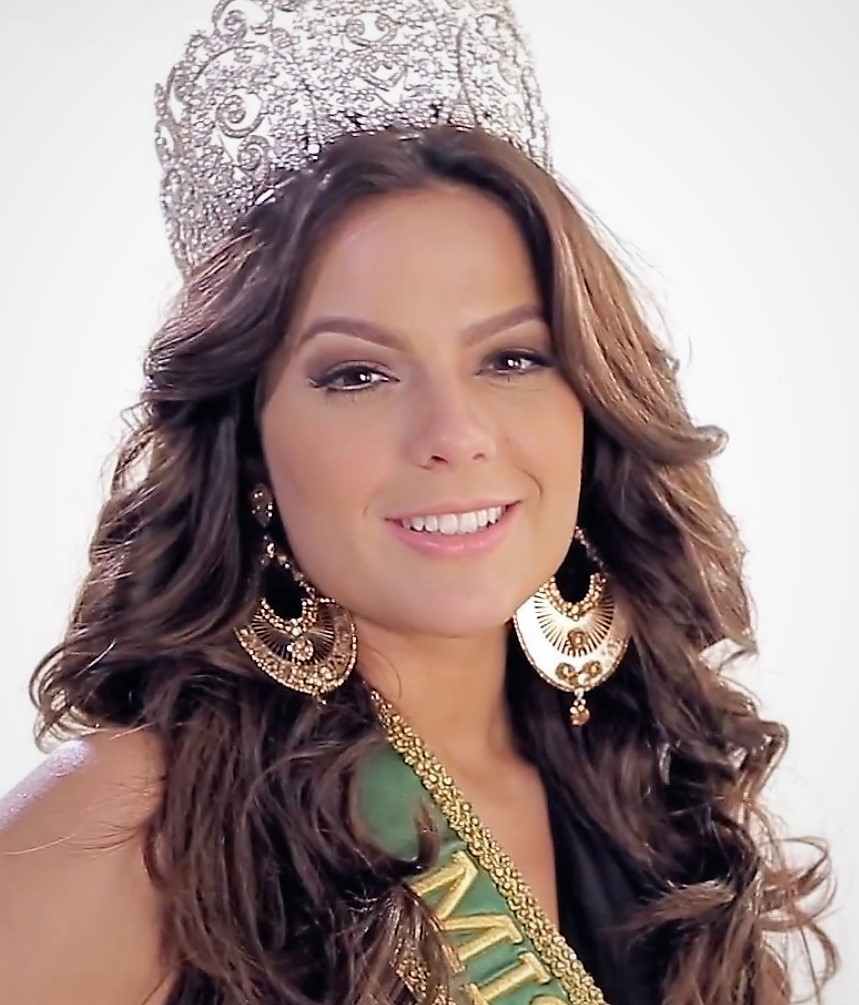
Miss Brazil 2014
Melissa Gurgel

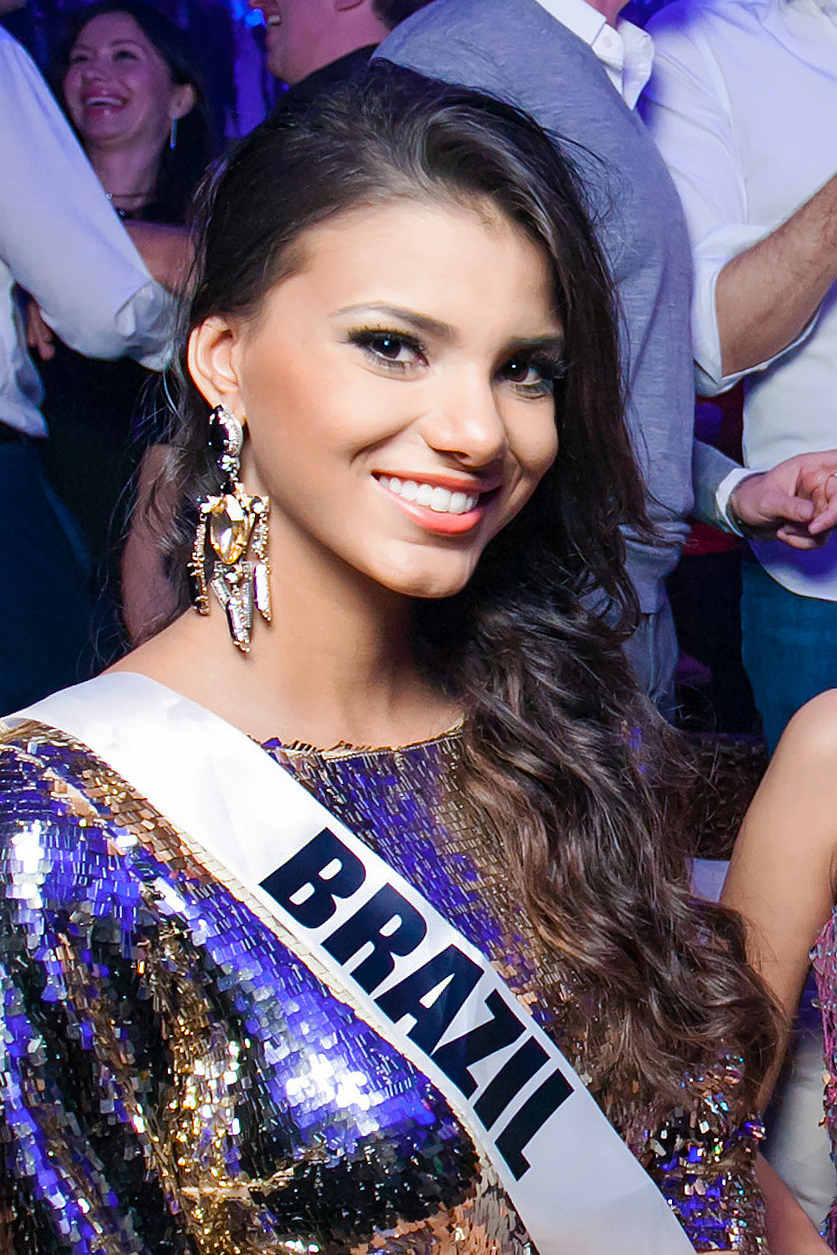
Miss Brazil 2013
Jakelyne Oliveira

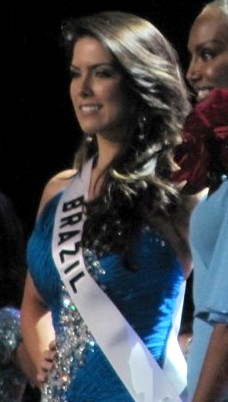
Miss Brazil 2010
Débora Lyra

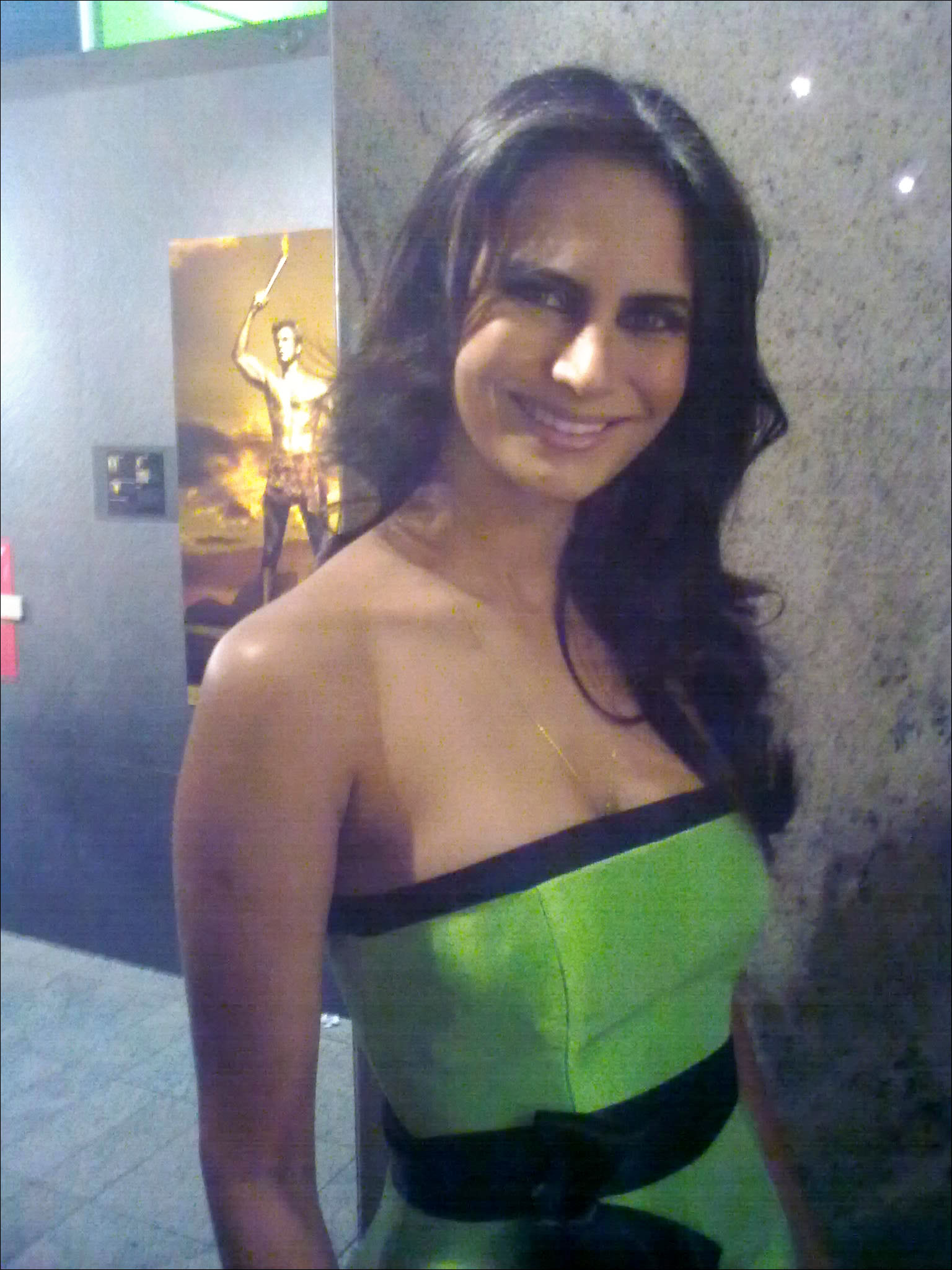
Miss Brazil 2009
Larissa Costa

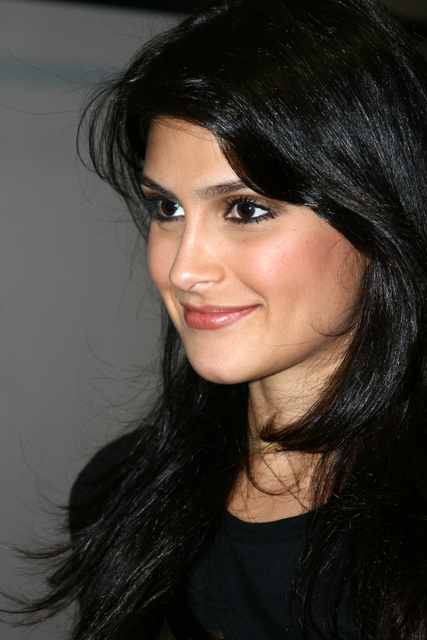
Miss Brazil 2007
Natália Guimarães

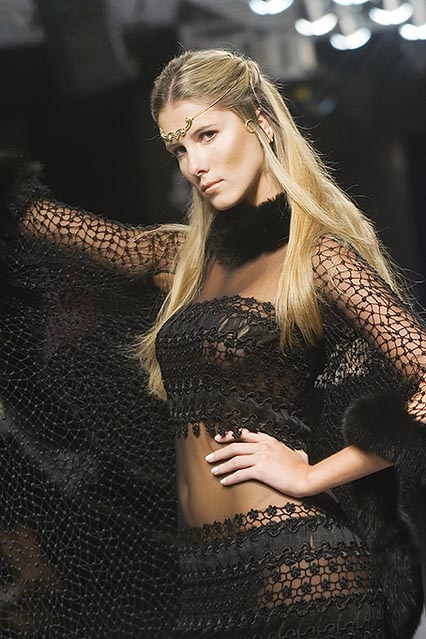
Miss Brazil 2005
Carina Beduschi

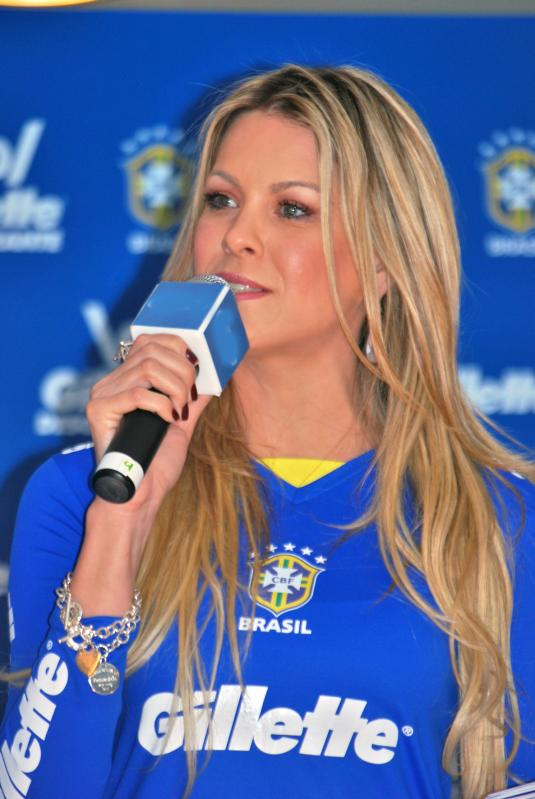
Miss Brazil 1999
Renata Fan

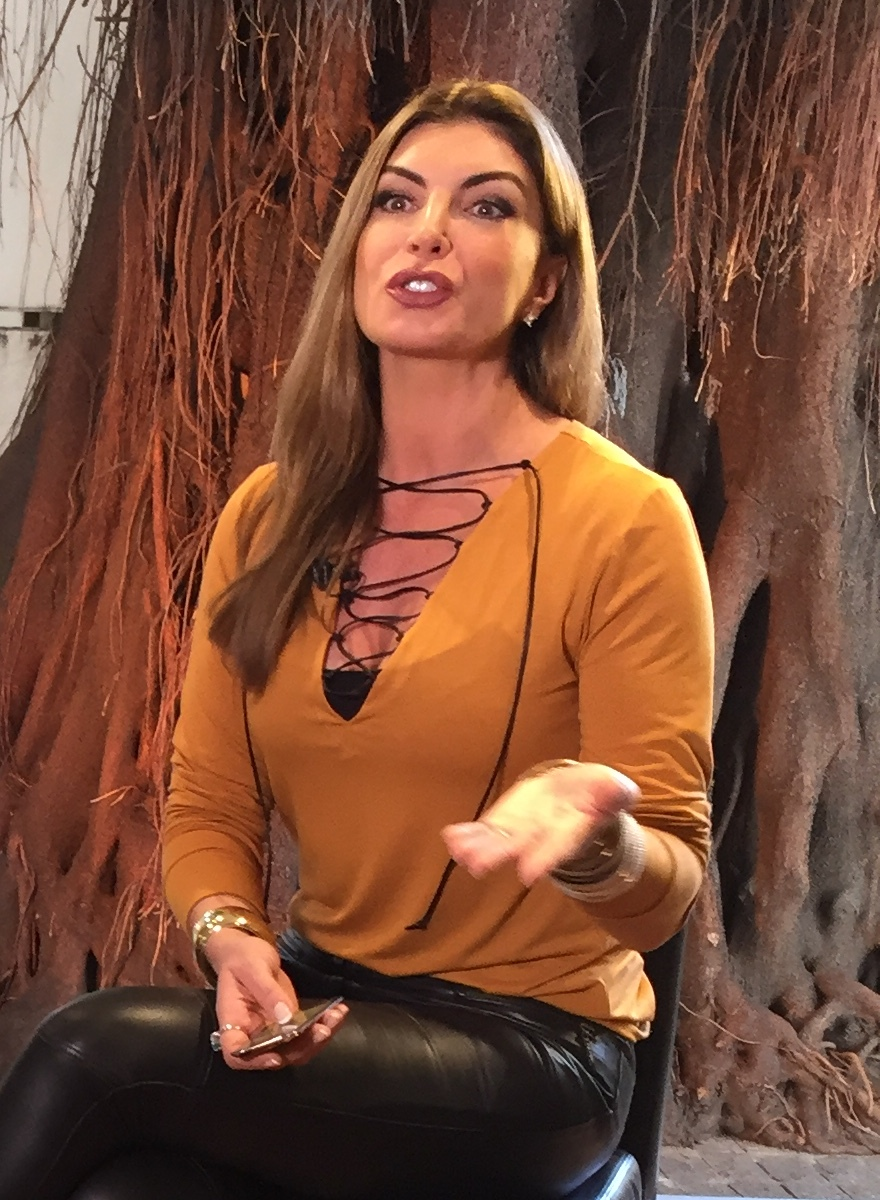
Miss Brazil 1993
Leila Schuster

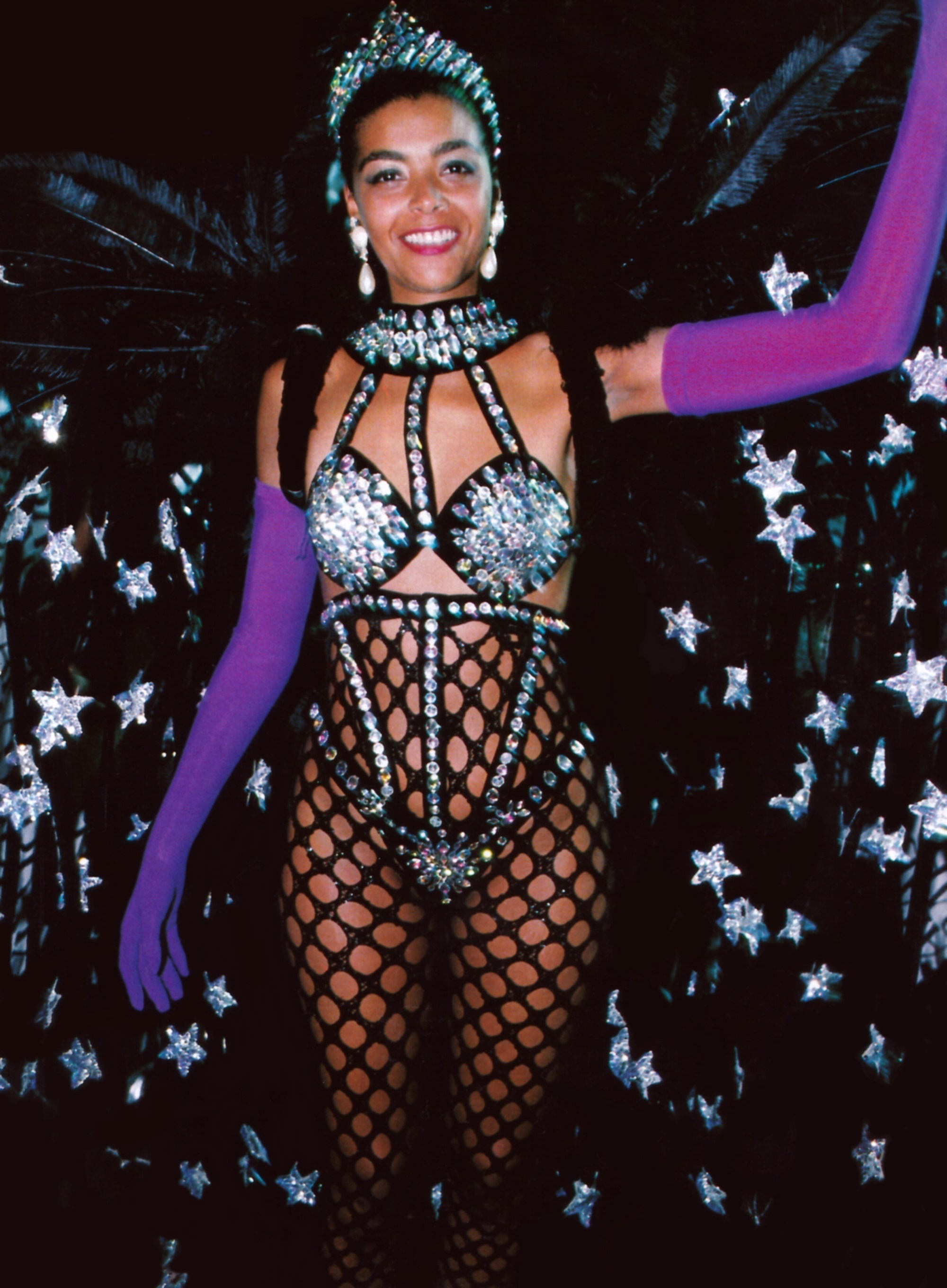
Miss Brazil 1986 Deise Nunes

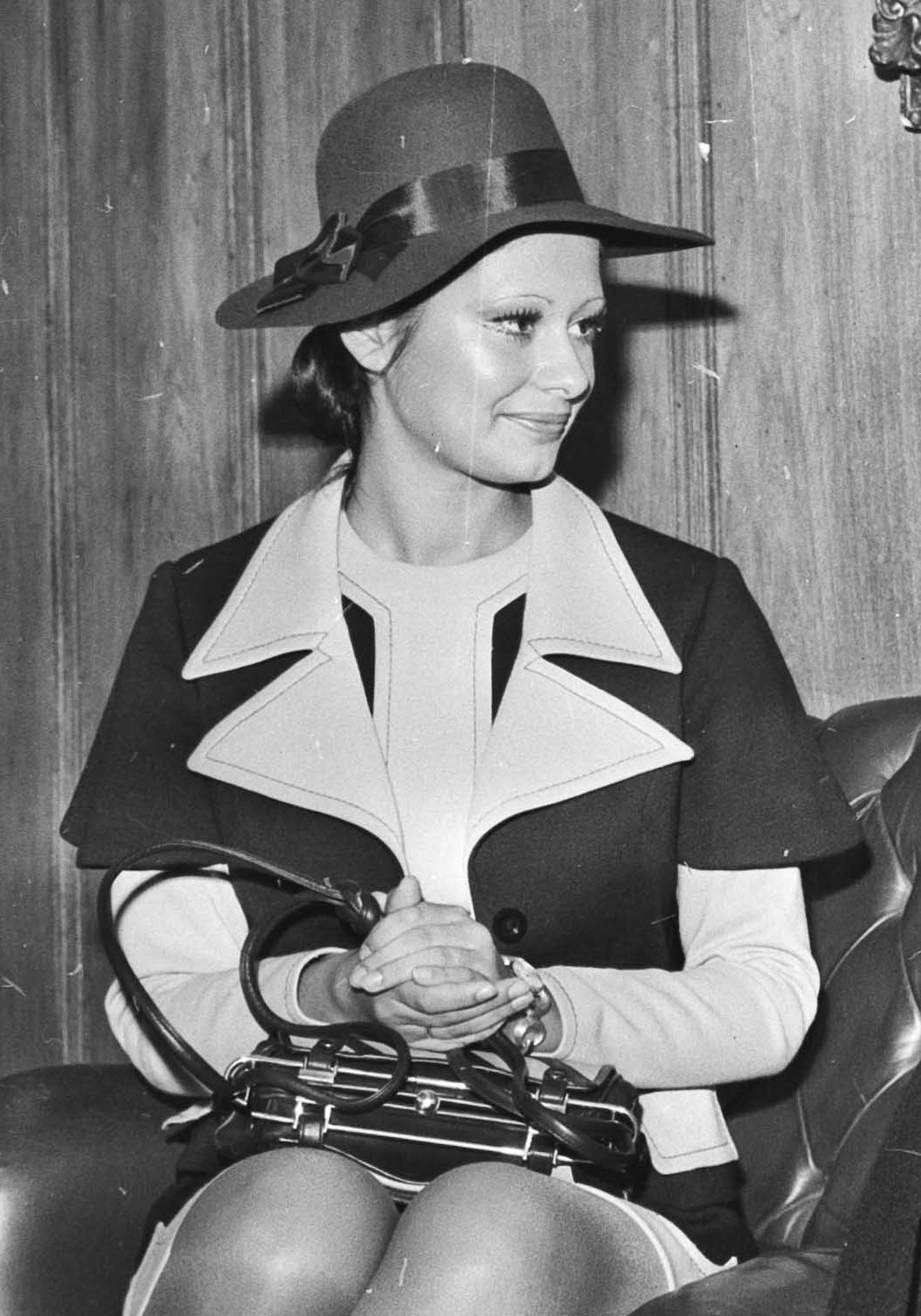
Miss Brazil 1973
Sandra Mara Ferreira

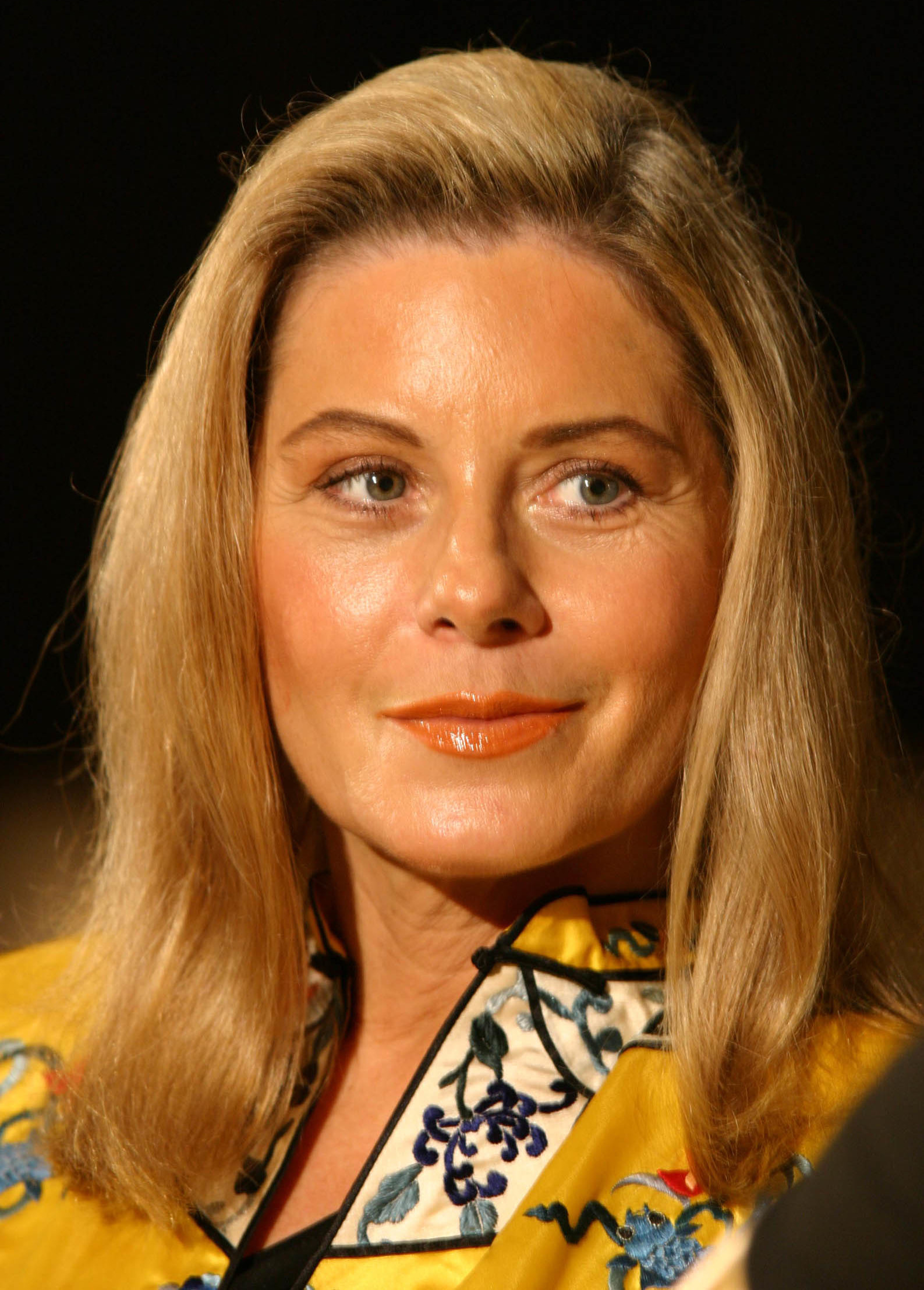
Miss Brazil 1969
Vera Fischer

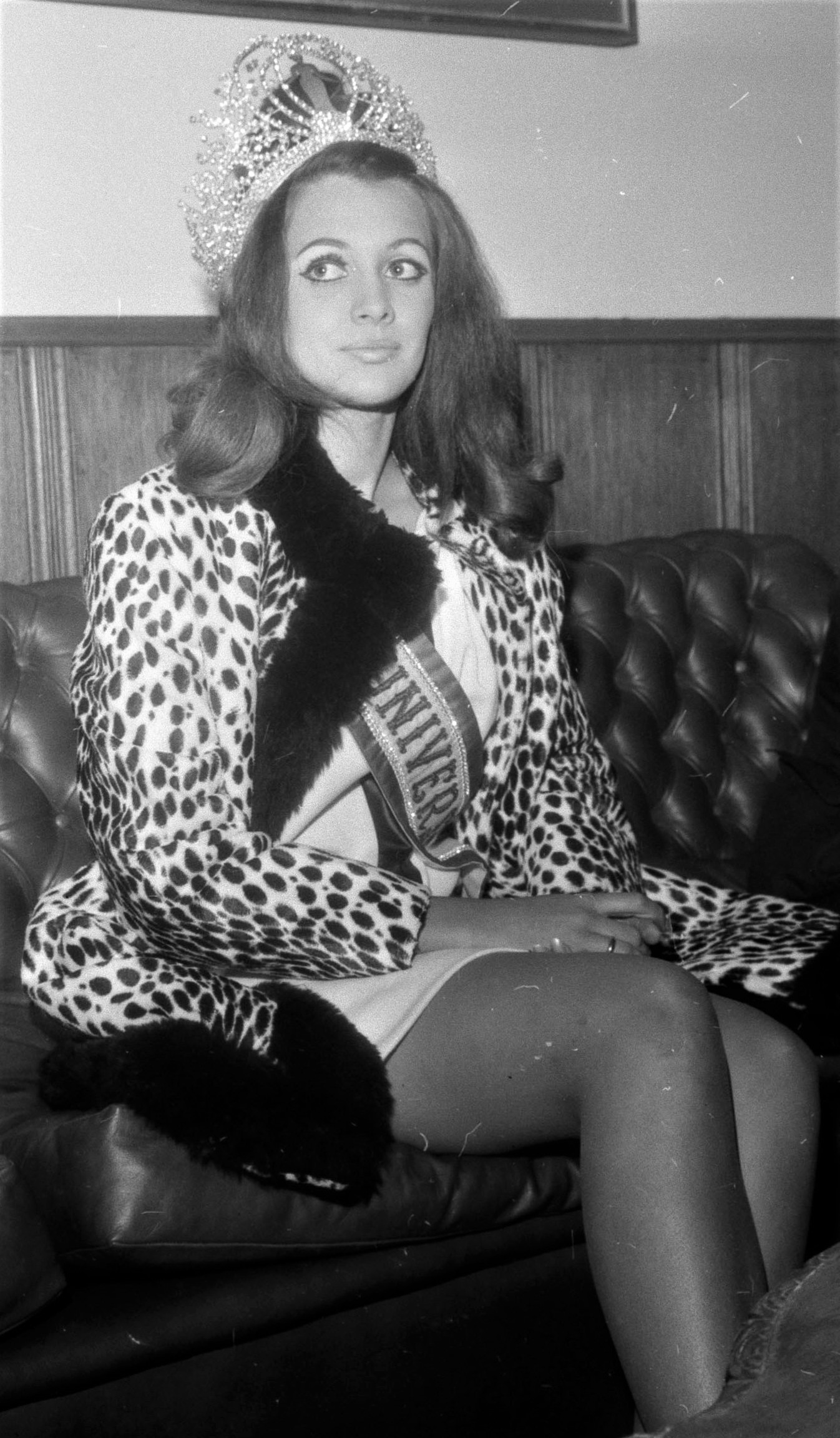
Miss Brazil 1968
Martha Vasconcellos

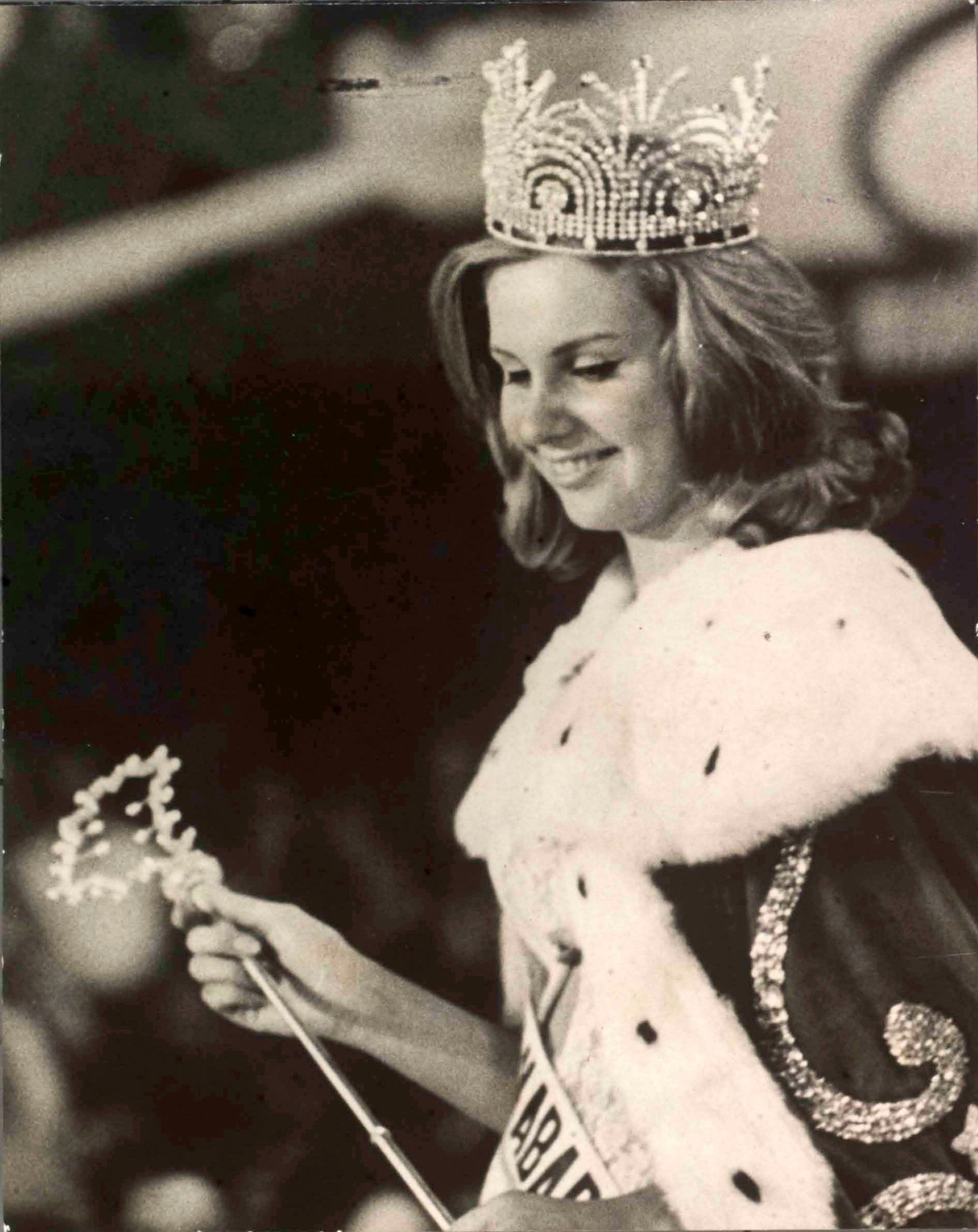
Miss Brazil 1965
Maria Raquel de Andrade

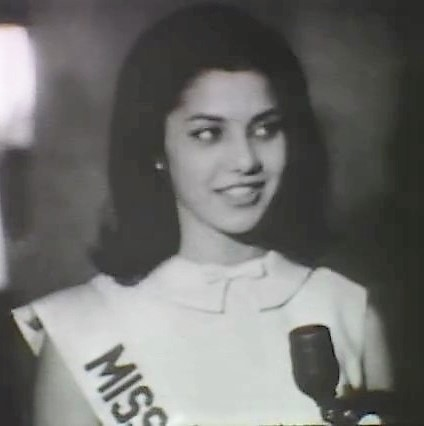
Miss Brazil 1963
Iêda Maria Vargas

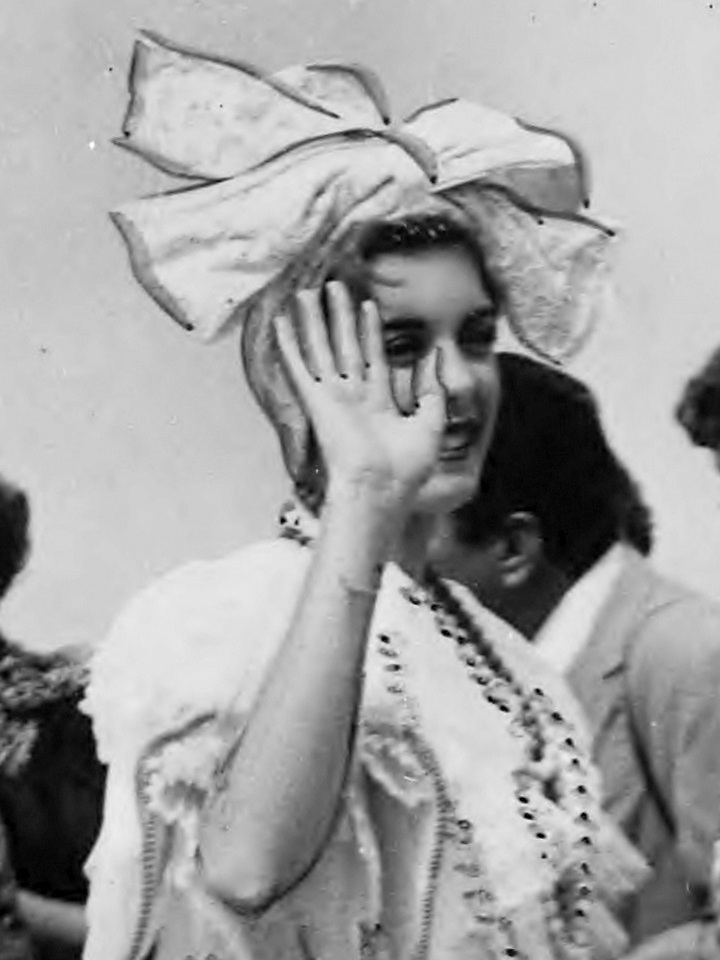
Miss Brazil 1959
Vera Ribeiro

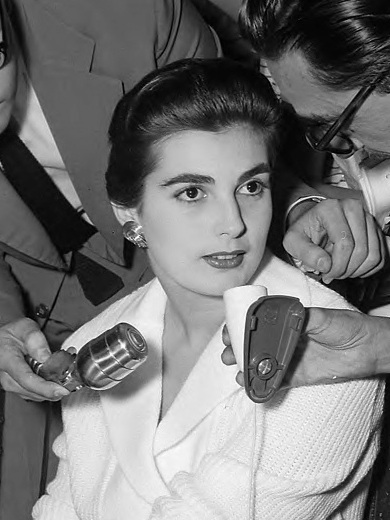
Miss Brazil 1958
Adalgisa Colombo

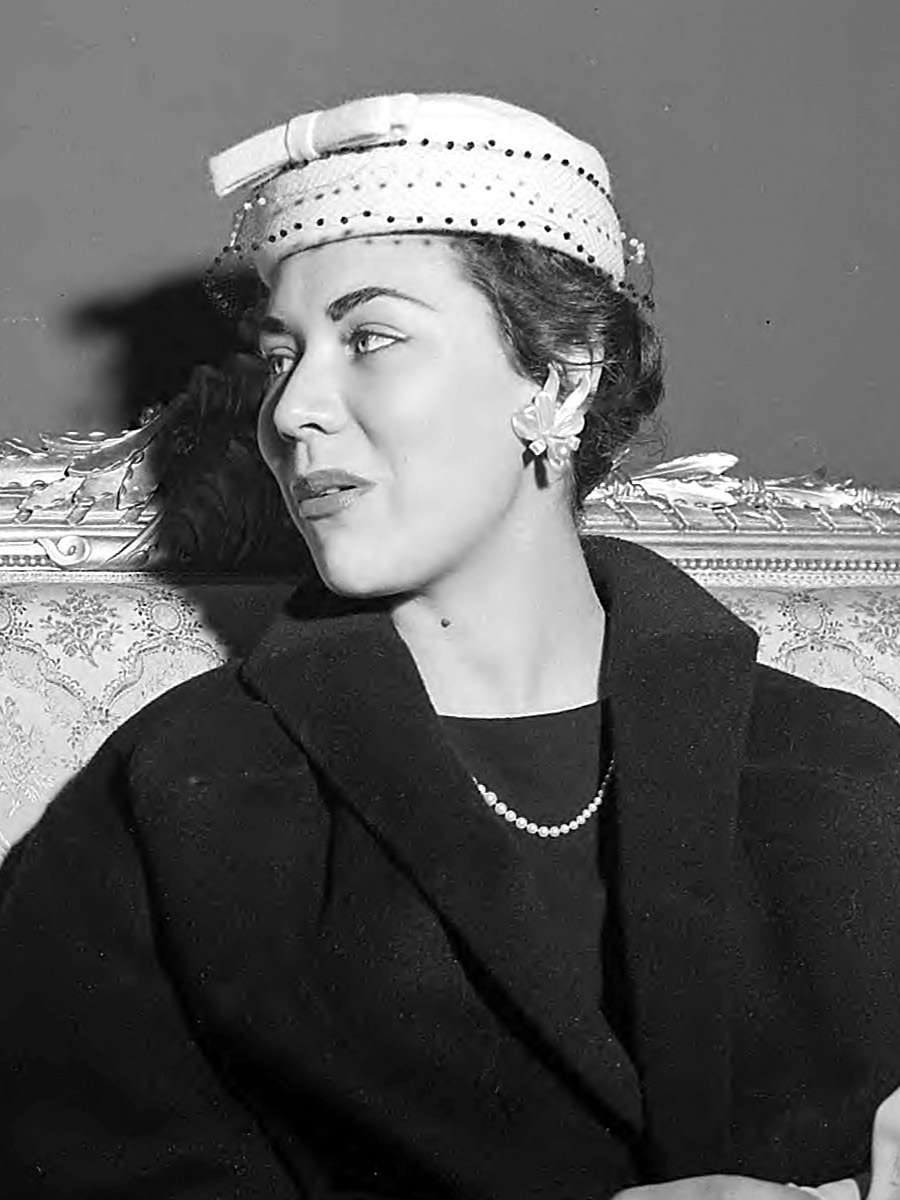
Miss Brazil 1956
Maria José Cardoso

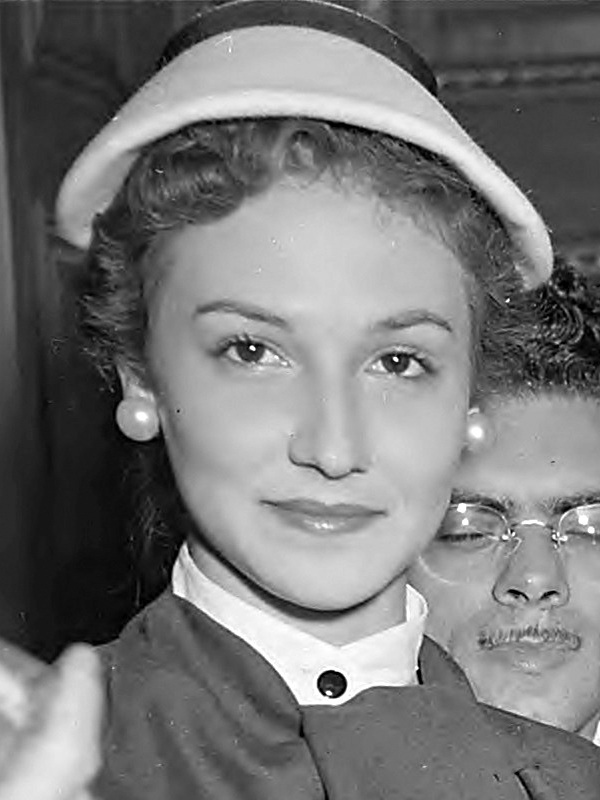
Miss Brazil 1955
Emília Barreto

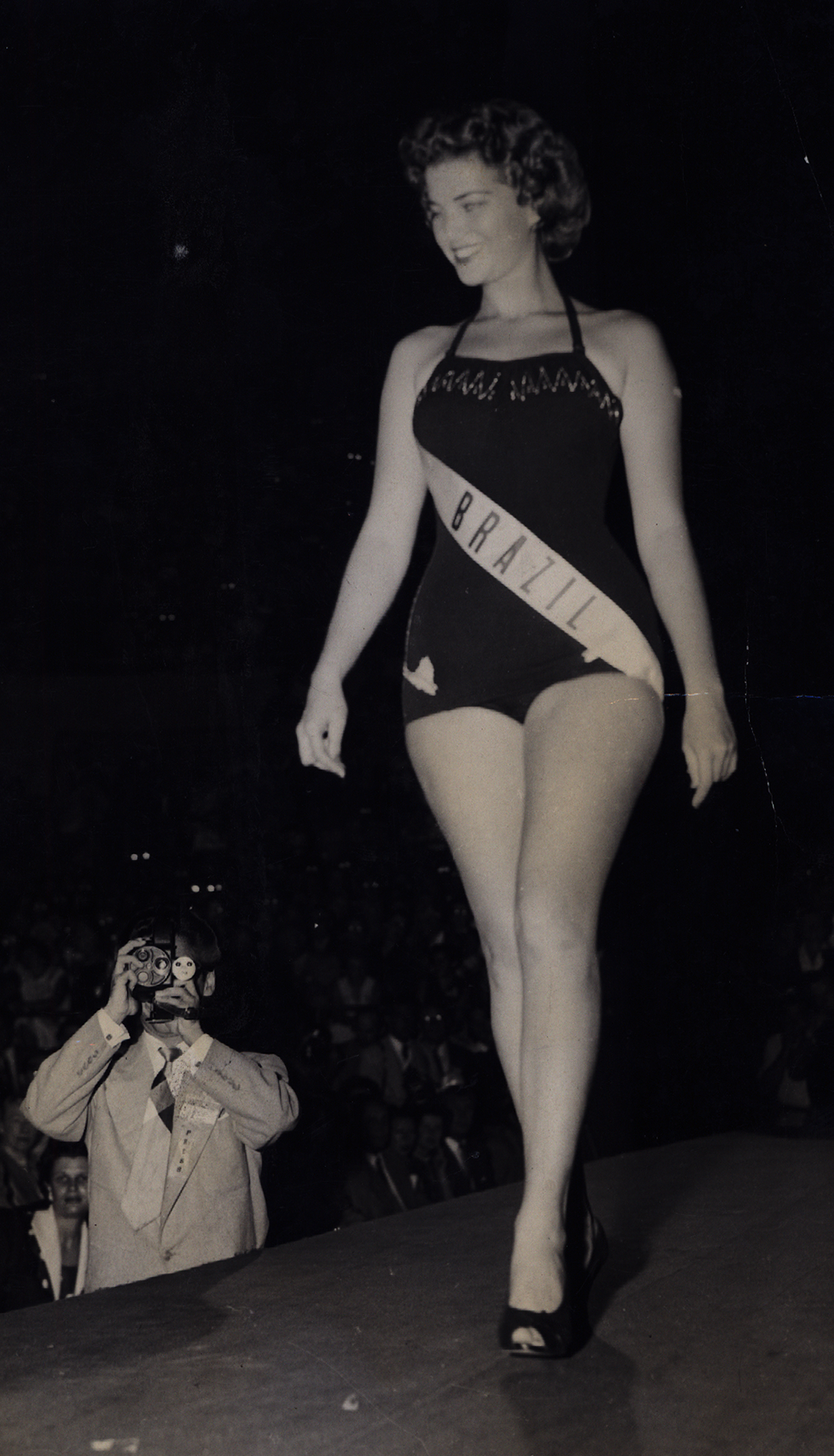
Miss Brazil 1954
Martha Rocha

=== Winners by state ===
Number	State	Years
15	Rio Grande do Sul	1956; 1963; 1972; 1986; 1993; 1999; 2001; 2004; 2006; 2008; 2011; 2012; 2015; 2020; 2023
9	Minas Gerais	1961; 1971; 1978; 1983; 1995; 1997; 2007; 2010; 2019
8	São Paulo	1967; 1973; 1974; 1976; 1977; 1984; 1991; 1994
8	Rio de Janeiro (Note: Until 1960, portions of Rio de Janeiro were administered under the Federal District of Brazil at the time, which was the city of Rio de Janeiro, and titleholders who represented Distrito Federal (Rio de Janeiro) are included here.) (Note: Until 1975, portions of Rio de Janeiro were administered under the state of Guanabara, and titleholders who represented Guanabara are included here.)	1958; 1959; 1960; 1965; 1966; 1970; 1980; 1981
5	Paraná	1964; 1992; 1996; 2016; 2026
5	Santa Catarina	1969; 1975; 1988; 2002; 2005
4	Ceará	1955; 1989; 2014; 2021
3	Mato Grosso	1985; 2000; 2013
3	Bahia	1954; 1962; 1968
2	Piauí	2017; 2025
2	Amazonas	1957; 2018
2	Rio Grande do Norte	1979; 2009
1	Pernambuco	2024
1	Espírito Santo	2022
1	Tocantins	2003
1	Mato Grosso do Sul	1998
1	Distrito Federal	1987
1	Pará	1982
