= List of Miss Brazil titleholders =

Miss Brazil is a Brazilian beauty pageant that has been held annually since 1954.

== Titleholders ==
Year	Miss Brazil	Hometown	State	Age (Note: Ages at the time of Miss Brazil)	Height	Notes
1954	Martha Rocha	Salvador	Bahia	21	1.70 m (5 ft 7 in)	1s runner-up at Miss Universe 1954
1955	Emília Barreto	Sobral	Ceará	18	1.71 m (5 ft 7 1/2 in)	Top 15 at Miss Universe 1955
1956	Maria José Cardoso	São Francisco do Sul	Rio Grande do Sul	21	1.70 m (5 ft 7 in)	Top 15 at Miss Universe 1956
1957	Terezinha Morango	São Paulo de Olivença	Amazonas	20	1.67 m (5 ft 5 1/2 in)	1st runner-up at Miss Universe 1957
1958	Adalgisa Colombo	Rio de Janeiro	Distrito Federal	18	1.69 m (5 ft 6 1/2 in)	Adalgisa resigned her title after being 1st runner-up at Miss Universe 1958 to get married. Sônia, the 1st runner-up, took over the title.
1958	Sônia Campos	Recife	Pernambuco	18	1.71 m (5 ft 7 1/2 in)	Adalgisa resigned her title after being 1st runner-up at Miss Universe 1958 to get married. Sônia, the 1st runner-up, took over the title.
1959	Vera Regina Ribeiro	Rio de Janeiro	Distrito Federal	19	1.70 m (5 ft 7 in)	4th runner-up at Miss Universe 1959
1960	Gina MacPherson	Niterói	Guanabara	20	1.72 m (5 ft 7 1/2 in)	Top 15 at Miss Universe 1960
1961	Staël Abelha	Caratinga	Minas Gerais	19	1.70 m (5 ft 7 in)	Staël relinquished the title after competing at Miss Universe 1961 to get married. Vera, the 1st runner-up took over the title.
1961	Vera Brauner	Pelotas	Rio Grande do Sul	19	1.70 m (5 ft 7 in)	Staël relinquished the title after competing at Miss Universe 1961 to get married. Vera, the 1st runner-up took over the title.
1962	Olívia Rebouças	Itabuna	Bahia	22	1.73 m (5 ft 8 in)	4th runner-up at Miss Universe 1962
1963	Iêda Maria Vargas	Porto Alegre	Rio Grande do Sul	18	1.70 m (5 ft 7 in)	Miss Universe 1963
1964	Ângela Vasconcelos	Rio de Janeiro	Paraná	19	1.75 m (5 ft 9 in)	Top 15 at Miss Universe 1964
1965	Raquel Andrade	Rio de Janeiro	Guanabara	20	1.70 m (5 ft 7 in)	Top 15 at Miss Universe 1965
1966	Ana Cristina Ridzi	Rio de Janeiro	Guanabara	19	1.72 m (5 ft 7 1/2 in)	
1967	Carmen Ramasco	Campinas	São Paulo	21	1.73 m (5 ft 8 in)	Carmen resigned the title after being Top 15 at Miss Universe 1967 due to personal reasons. Wilza, the 1st runner-up took over the title.
1967	Wilza Rainato	São João da Boa Vista	Paraná	17	1.75 m (5 ft 9 in)	Carmen resigned the title after being Top 15 at Miss Universe 1967 due to personal reasons. Wilza, the 1st runner-up took over the title.
1968	Martha Vasconcellos	Salvador	Bahia	20	1.75 m (5 ft 9 in)	Miss Universe 1968
1969	Vera Fischer	Blumenau	Santa Catarina	17	1.72 m (5 ft 7 1/2 in)	Top 15 at Miss Universe 1969
1970	Eliane Thompson	Piraí	Guanabara	21	1.71 m (5 ft 7 1/2 in)	Top 15 at Miss Universe 1970
1971	Eliane Guimarães	Mariana	Minas Gerais	21	1.80 m (5 ft 11 in)	4th runner-up at Miss Universe 1971
1972	Rejane Vieira Costa	Cachoeira do Sul	Rio Grande do Sul	17		1st runner-up at Miss Universe 1972
1973	Sandra Mara Ferreira	São Paulo	São Paulo	21	1.77 m (5 ft 9 1/2 in)	Top 12 at Miss Universe 1973
1974	Sandra Guimarães	Ribeirão Preto	São Paulo	18	1.72 m (5 ft 7 1/2 in)	Sandra resigned her national title after competing at Miss Universe 1974 to get married. Janeta, the 1st runner-up, took over the title.
1974	Janeta Hoeveler	Porto Alegre	Rio Grande do Sul	21	1.74 m (5 ft 8 1/2 in)	Sandra resigned her national title after competing at Miss Universe 1974 to get married. Janeta, the 1st runner-up, took over the title.
1975	Ingrid Budag	Blumenau	Santa Catarina	18	1.73 m (5 ft 8 in)	Top 12 at Miss Universe 1975
1976	Kátia Moretto	Sorocaba	São Paulo	18	1.80 m (5 ft 11 in)	
1977	Cássia Janys	Indaiatuba	São Paulo	20	1.70 m (5 ft 7 in)	
1978	Suzana Araújo	Dionísio	Minas Gerais	19		
1979	Marta Jussara	Mossoró	Rio Grande do Norte	20	1.80 m (5 ft 11 in)	3rd runner-up at Miss Universe 1979
1980	Eveline Schroeter	Rio de Janeiro	Rio de Janeiro	19	1.80 m (5 ft 11 in)	
1981	Adriana Alves	Rio Grande	Rio de Janeiro	18	1.80 m (5 ft 11 in)	3rd runner-up at Miss Universe 1981
1982	Celice Pinto	Belém	Pará	18	1.78 m (5 ft 10 in)	Top 12 at Miss Universe 1982
1983	Marisa Fully	Manhumirim	Minas Gerais	21	1.73 m (5 ft 8 in)	
1984	Ana Elisa Flores	São Paulo	São Paulo	18	1.76 m (5 ft 9 1/2 in)	
1985	Márcia Gabrielle	Rio de Janeiro	Mato Grosso	21	1.78 m (5 ft 10 in)	Top 10 at Miss Universe 1985
1986	Deise Nunes	Porto Alegre	Rio Grande do Sul	18	1.74 m (5 ft 8 1/2 in)	Top 10 at Miss Universe 1986
1987	Jacqueline Meirelles	Cuiabá	Distrito Federal	24	1.75 m (5 ft 9 in)	
1988	Isabel Beduschi	Blumenau	Santa Catarina	18	1.70 m (5 ft 7 in)	
1989	Flávia Cavalcante	Fortaleza	Ceará	20	1.73 m (5 ft 8 in)	
1990	No titleholder					
1991	Patrícia Godói	São Carlos	São Paulo	20	1.78 m (5 ft 10 in)	
1992	Carolina Otto	Rio de Janeiro	Paraná	18		
1993	Leila Schuster	Cachoeirinha	Rio Grande do Sul	19		Top 10 at Miss Universe 1993
1994	Valéria Péris	Conchal	São Paulo	23		
1995	Renata Bessa	Contagem	Minas Gerais	18	1.70 m (5 ft 7 in)	
1996	Joana Parizotto	Criciúma	Paraná	19	1.80 m (5 ft 11 in)	
1997	Nayla Micherif	Ubá	Minas Gerais	21	1.80 m (5 ft 11 in)	
1998	Michella Marchi	Dourados	Mato Grosso do Sul	20	1.79 m (5 ft 10 1/2 in)	Top 10 at Miss Universe 1998
1999	Renata Fan	Santo Ângelo	Rio Grande do Sul	22	1.79 m (5 ft 10 1/2 in)	
2000	Josiane Kruliskoski	Catanduvas	Mato Grosso	19	1.78 m (5 ft 10 in)	
2001	Juliana Borges	Santa Maria	Rio Grande do Sul	22	1.80 m (5 ft 11 in)	
2002	Joseane Oliveira	Canoas	Rio Grande do Sul	20	1.81 m (5 ft 11 1/2 in)	Oliveira was dethroned after it was revealed she was married; Thömsen, the first runner-up, then took over as Miss Brazil 2002.
2002	Taíza Thömsen	Joinvile	Santa Catarina	20	1.70 m (5 ft 7 in)	Oliveira was dethroned after it was revealed she was married; Thömsen, the first runner-up, then took over as Miss Brazil 2002.
2003	Gislaine Ferreira	Belo Horizonte	Tocantins (Note: Ferreira was from the state of Minas Gerais, but was appointed to represent Tocantins after the state pageant organizers were unable to find a suitable candidate from Tocantins.)	19	1.73 m (5 ft 8 in)	Top 10 at Miss Universe 2003
2004	Fabiane Niclotti	Gramado	Rio Grande do Sul	19	1.82 m (5 ft 11 1/2 in)	
2005	Carina Beduschi	Florianópolis	Santa Catarina	20	1.80 m (5 ft 11 in)	
2006	Rafaela Zanella	Santa Maria	Rio Grande do Sul	20	1.80 m (5 ft 11 in)	Top 20 at Miss Universe 2006
2007	Natália Guimarães	Juiz de Fora	Minas Gerais	22	1.75 m (5 ft 9 in)	1st runner-up at Miss Universe 2007
2008	Natálya Anderle	Roca Sales	Rio Grande do Sul	22	1.75 m (5 ft 9 in)	
2009	Larissa Costa	Natal	Rio Grande do Norte	25	1.75 m (5 ft 9 in)	
2010	Débora Lyra	Vila Velha	Minas Gerais	23	1.80 m (5 ft 11 in)	
2011	Priscila Machado	Canoas	Rio Grande do Sul	25	1.80 m (5 ft 11 in)	2nd runner-up at Miss Universe 2011
2012	Gabriela Markus	Taquari	Rio Grande do Sul	21	1.80 m (5 ft 11 in)	4th runner-up at Miss Universe 2012
2013	Jakelyne Oliveira	Rondonópolis	Mato Grosso	20	1.76 m (5 ft 9 1/2 in)	4th runner-up at Miss Universe 2013
2014	Melissa Gurgel	Fortaleza	Ceará	20	1.68 m (5 ft 6 in)	Top 15 at Miss Universe 2014
2015	Marthina Brandt	Vale Real	Rio Grande do Sul	23	1.77 m (5 ft 9 1/2 in)	Top 15 at Miss Universe 2015
2016	Raissa Santana	Itaberaba	Paraná	21	1.75 m (5 ft 9 in)	Top 13 at Miss Universe 2016
2017	Monalysa Alcântara	Teresina	Piauí	18	1.77 m (5 ft 9 1/2 in)	Top 10 at Miss Universe 2017
2018	Mayra Dias	Itacoatiara	Amazonas	26	1.75 m (5 ft 9 in)	Top 20 at Miss Universe 2018
2019	Júlia Horta	Juiz de Fora	Minas Gerais	24	1.72 m (5 ft 7 1/2 in)	Top 20 at Miss Universe 2019
2020	Julia Gama (Note: Did not win the Miss Brazil title in a national pageant, but was appointed as the titleholder by the pageant organizers when a national pageant was not held)	Porto Alegre	Rio Grande do Sul	27	1.77 m (5 ft 9 1/2 in)	1st runner-up at Miss Universe 2020
2021	Teresa Santos	Fortaleza	Ceará	23	1.72 m (5 ft 7 1/2 in)	
2022	Mia Mamede	Vitória	Espírito Santo	26	1.70 m (5 ft 7 in)	
2023	Maria Brechane	Rio Grande	Rio Grande do Sul	19	1.76 m (5 ft 9 1/2 in)	
2024	Luana Cavalcante	Recife	Pernambuco	25	1.74 m (5 ft 8 1/2 in)	
2025	Gabriela Lacerda	Teresina	Piauí	23	1.78 m (5 ft 10 in)	Top 30 at Miss Universe 2025
2026	Marcella Kozinski	Curitiba	Paraná	26	1.75 m (5 ft 9 in)	TBA

=== Gallery ===
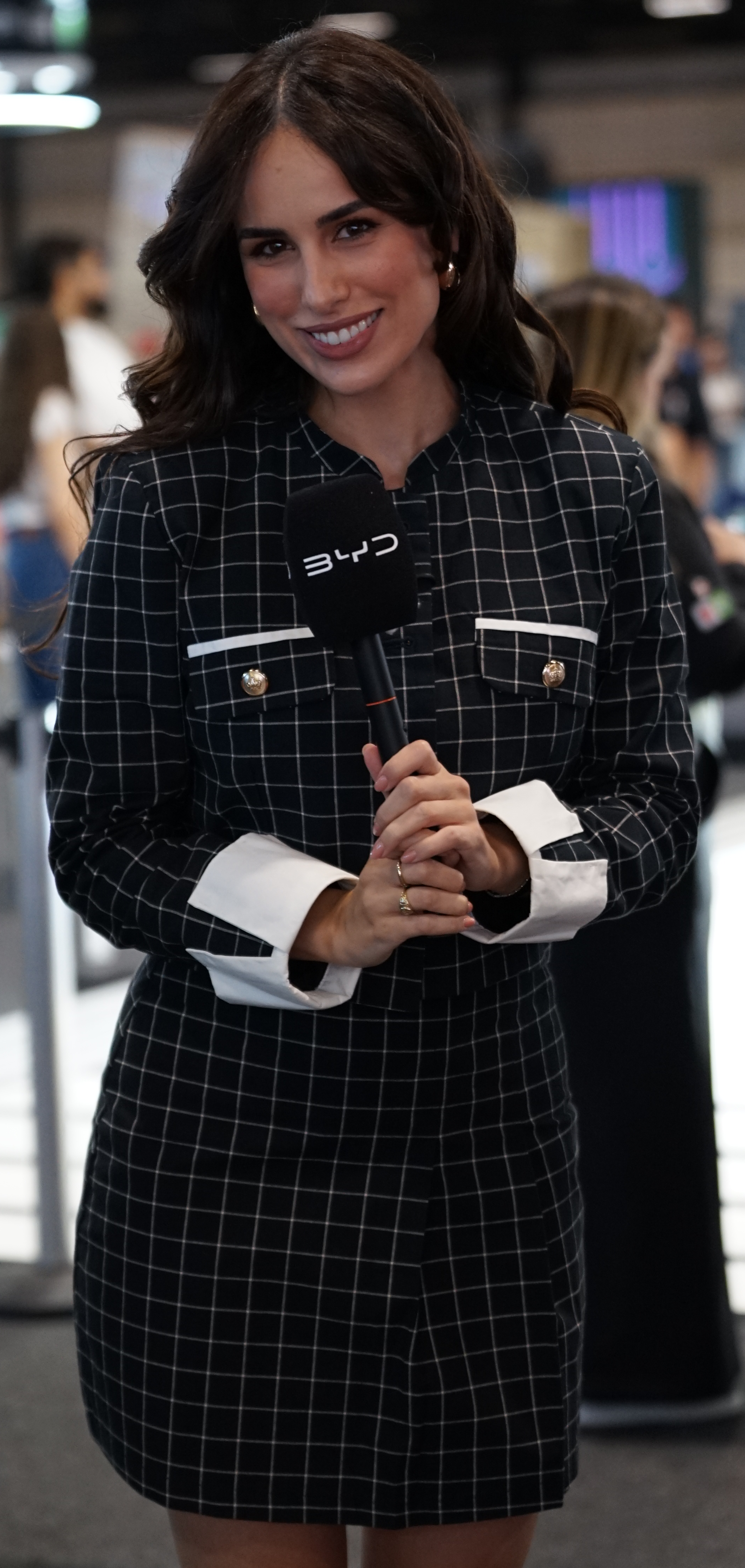
Miss Brazil 2022
Mia Mamede

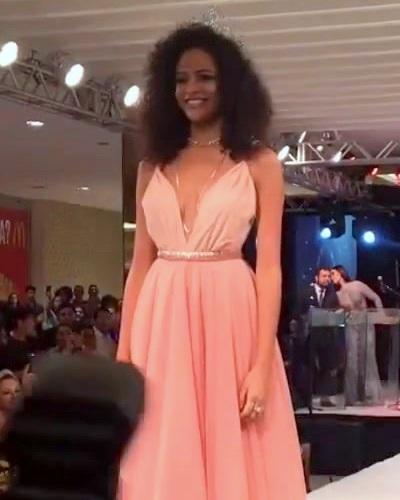
Miss Brazil 2017
Monalysa Alcântara

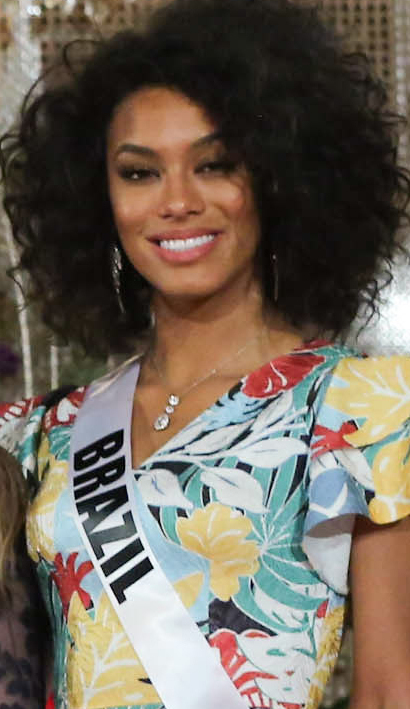
Miss Brazil 2016
Raissa Santana

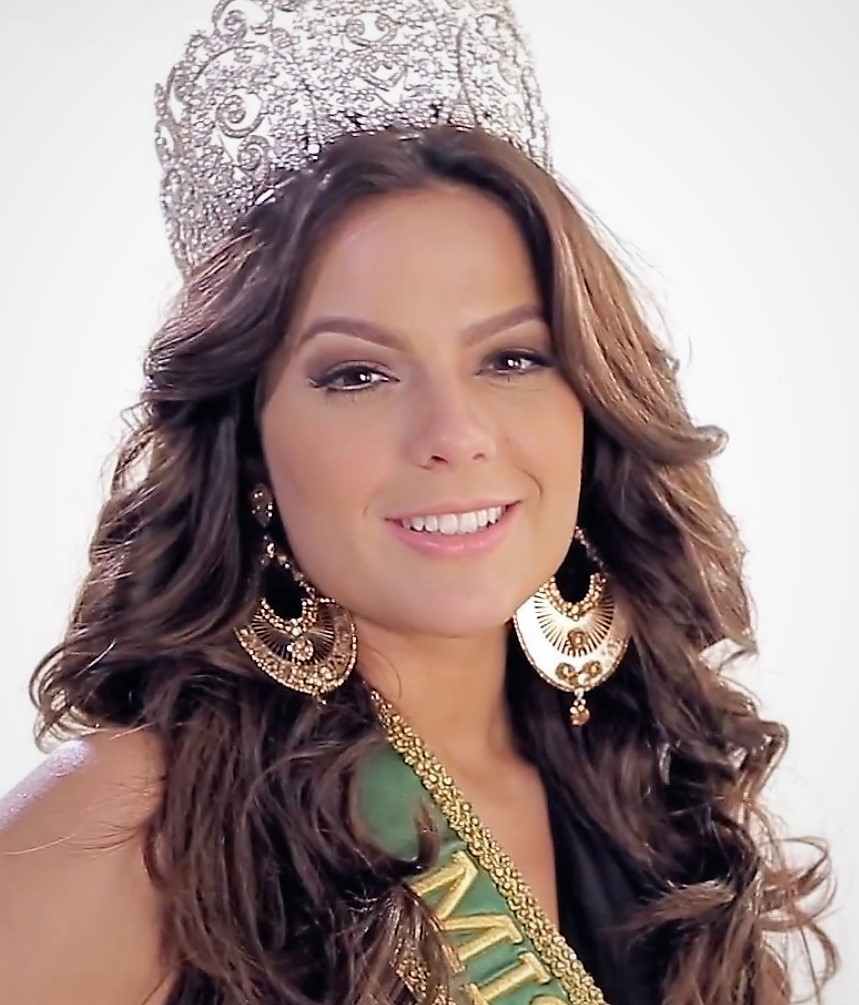
Miss Brazil 2014
Melissa Gurgel

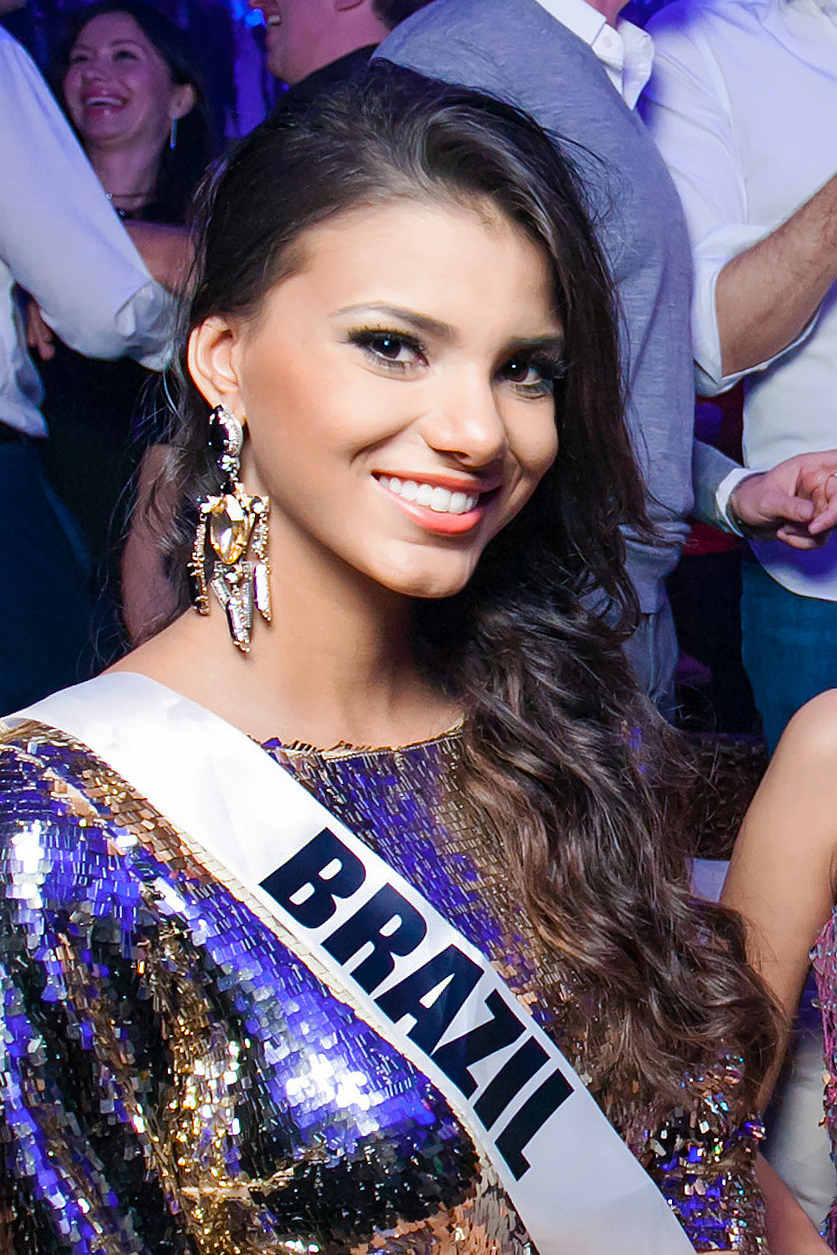
Miss Brazil 2013
Jakelyne Oliveira

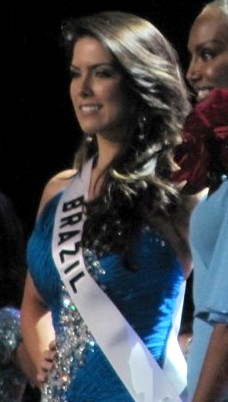
Miss Brazil 2010
Débora Lyra

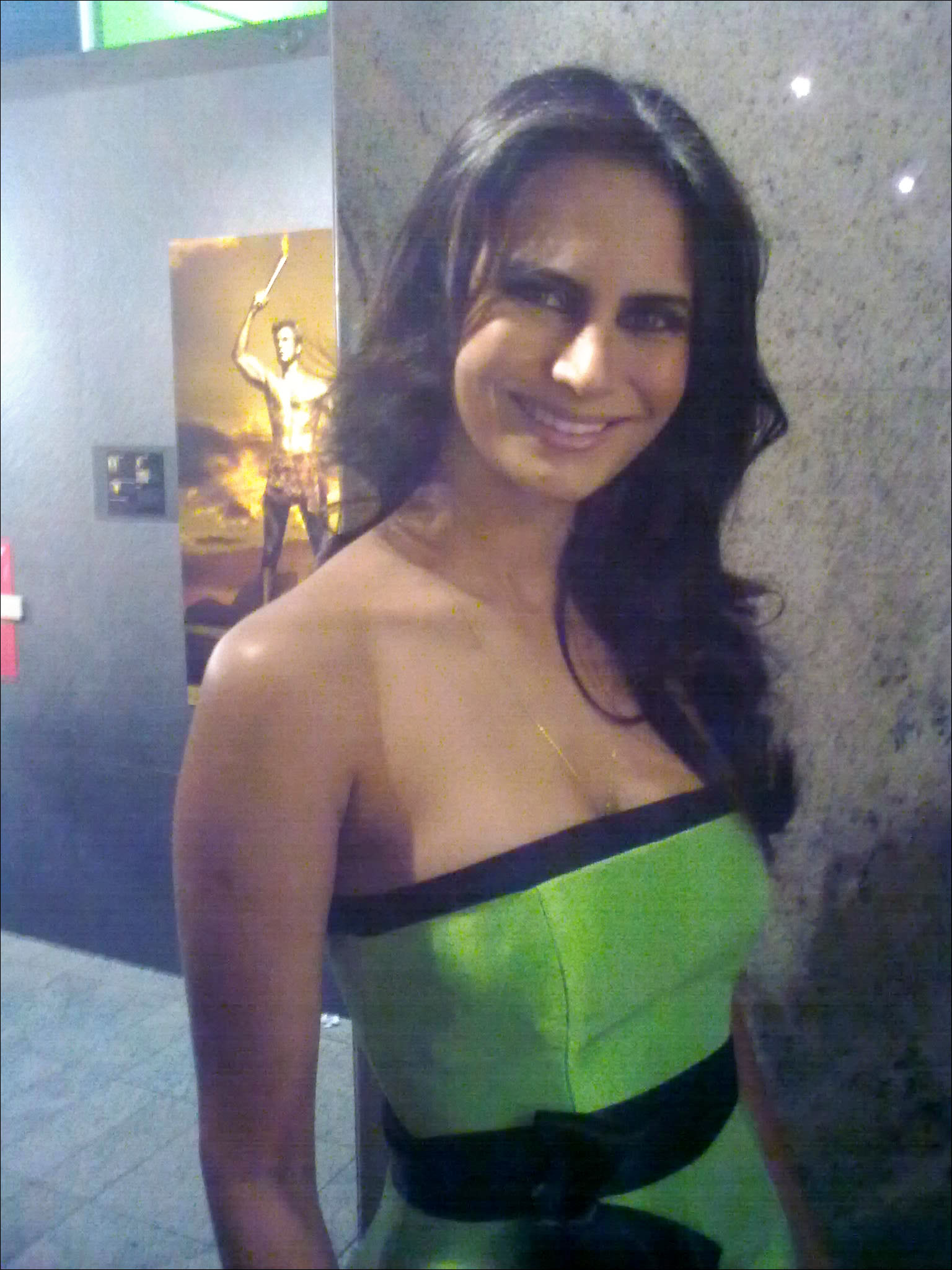
Miss Brazil 2009
Larissa Costa

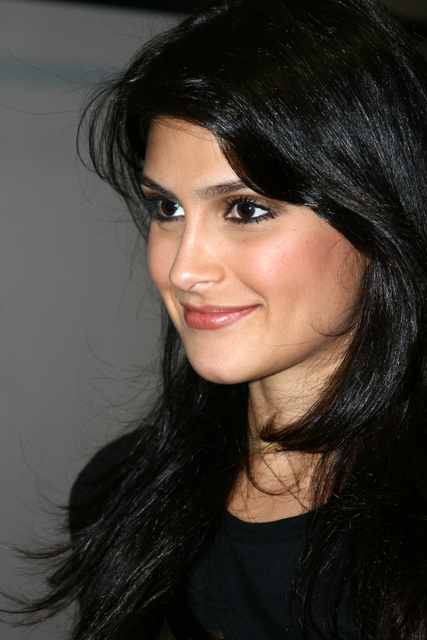
Miss Brazil 2007
Natália Guimarães

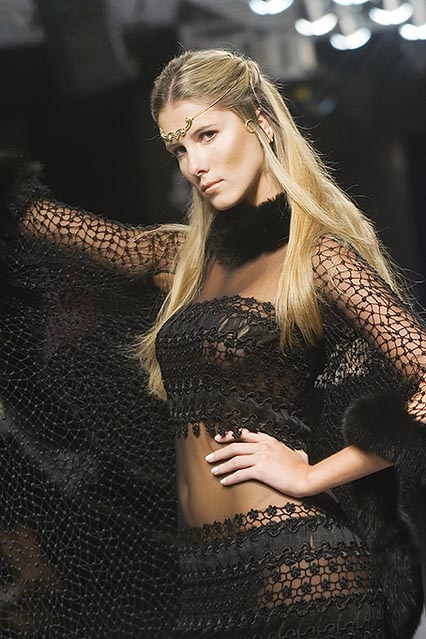
Miss Brazil 2005
Carina Beduschi

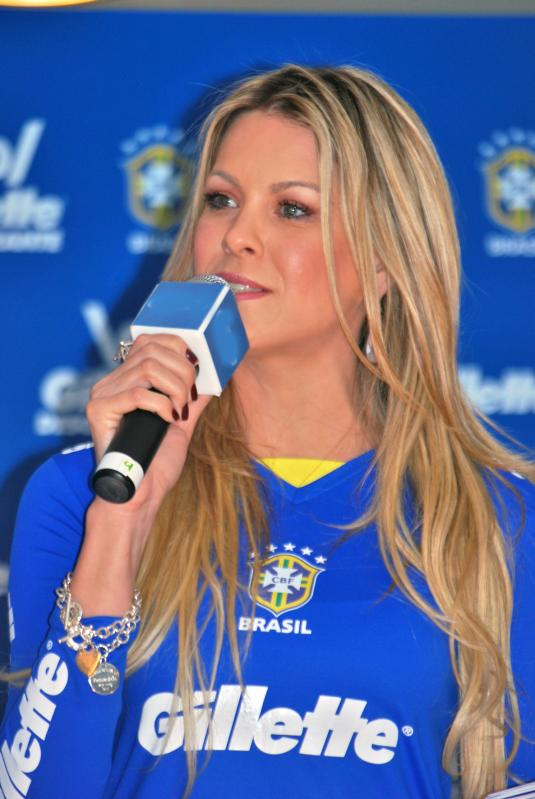
Miss Brazil 1999
Renata Fan

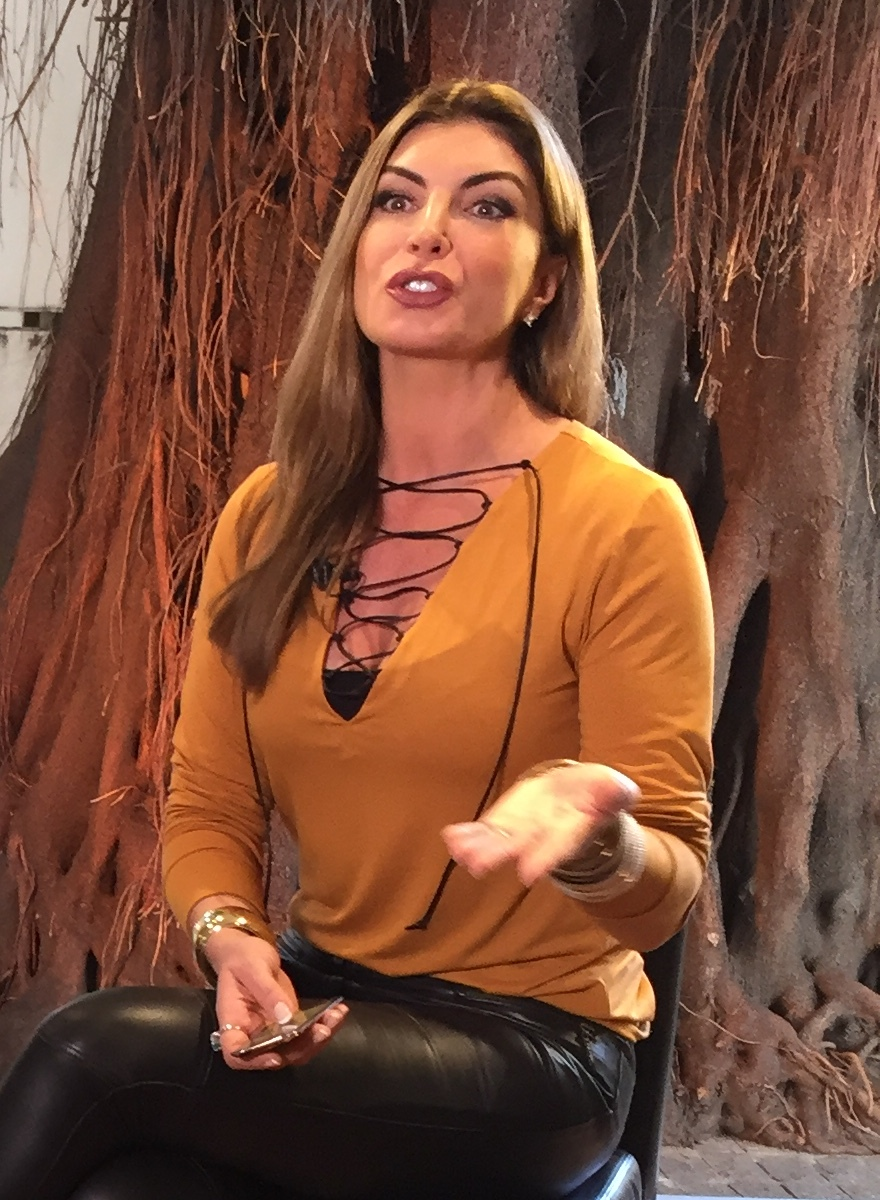
Miss Brazil 1993
Leila Schuster

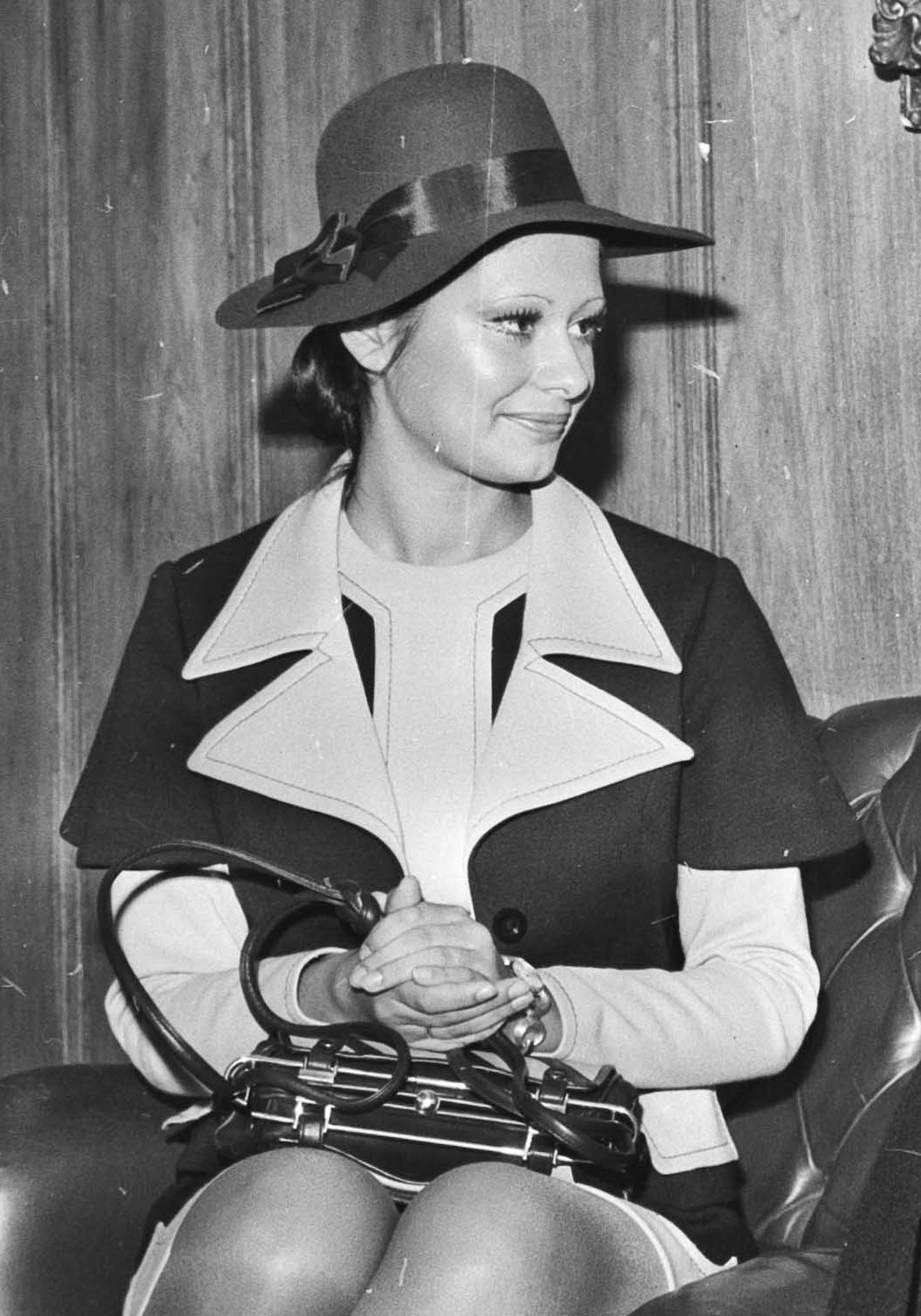
Miss Brazil 1973
Sandra Mara Ferreira

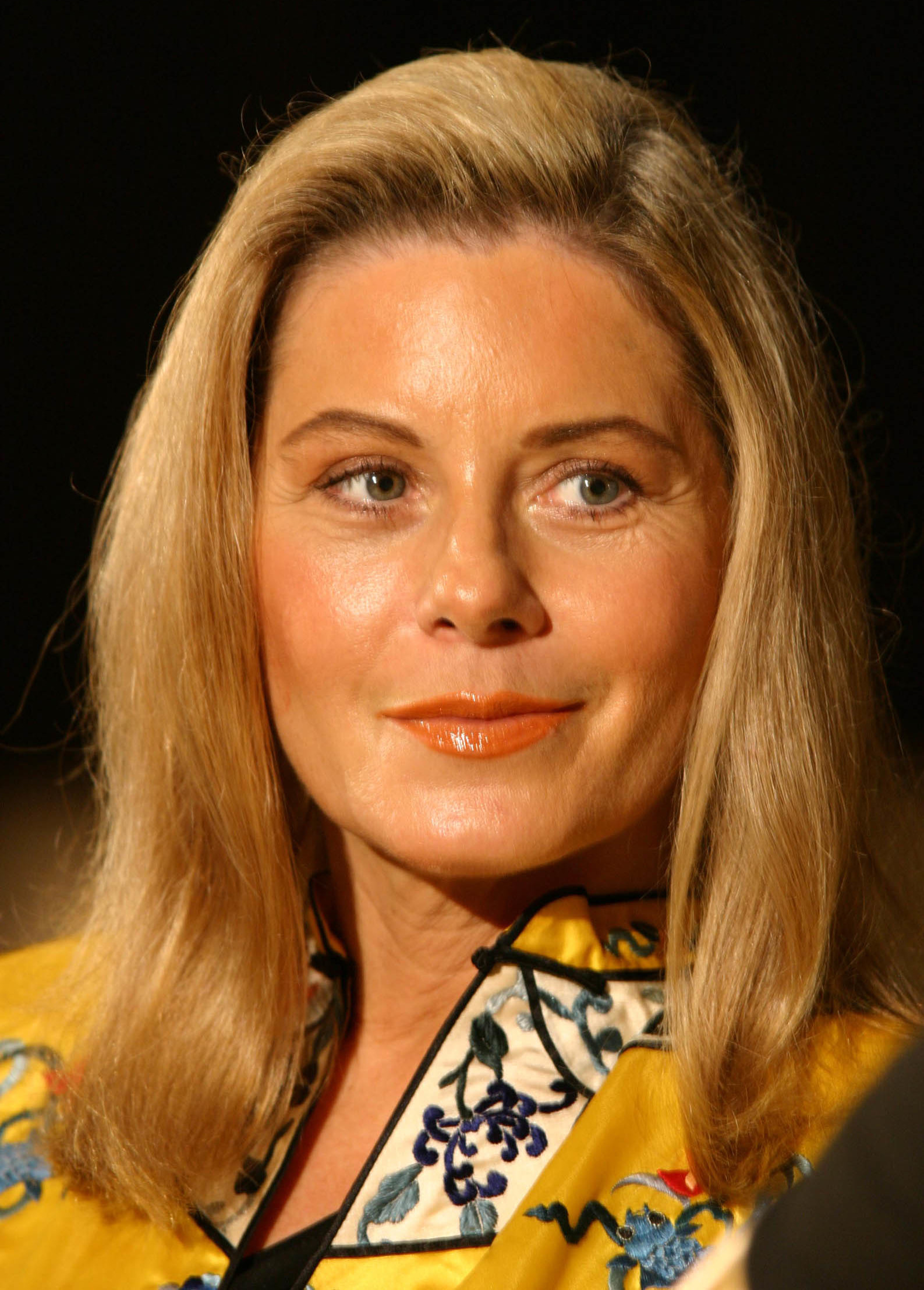
Miss Brazil 1969
Vera Fischer

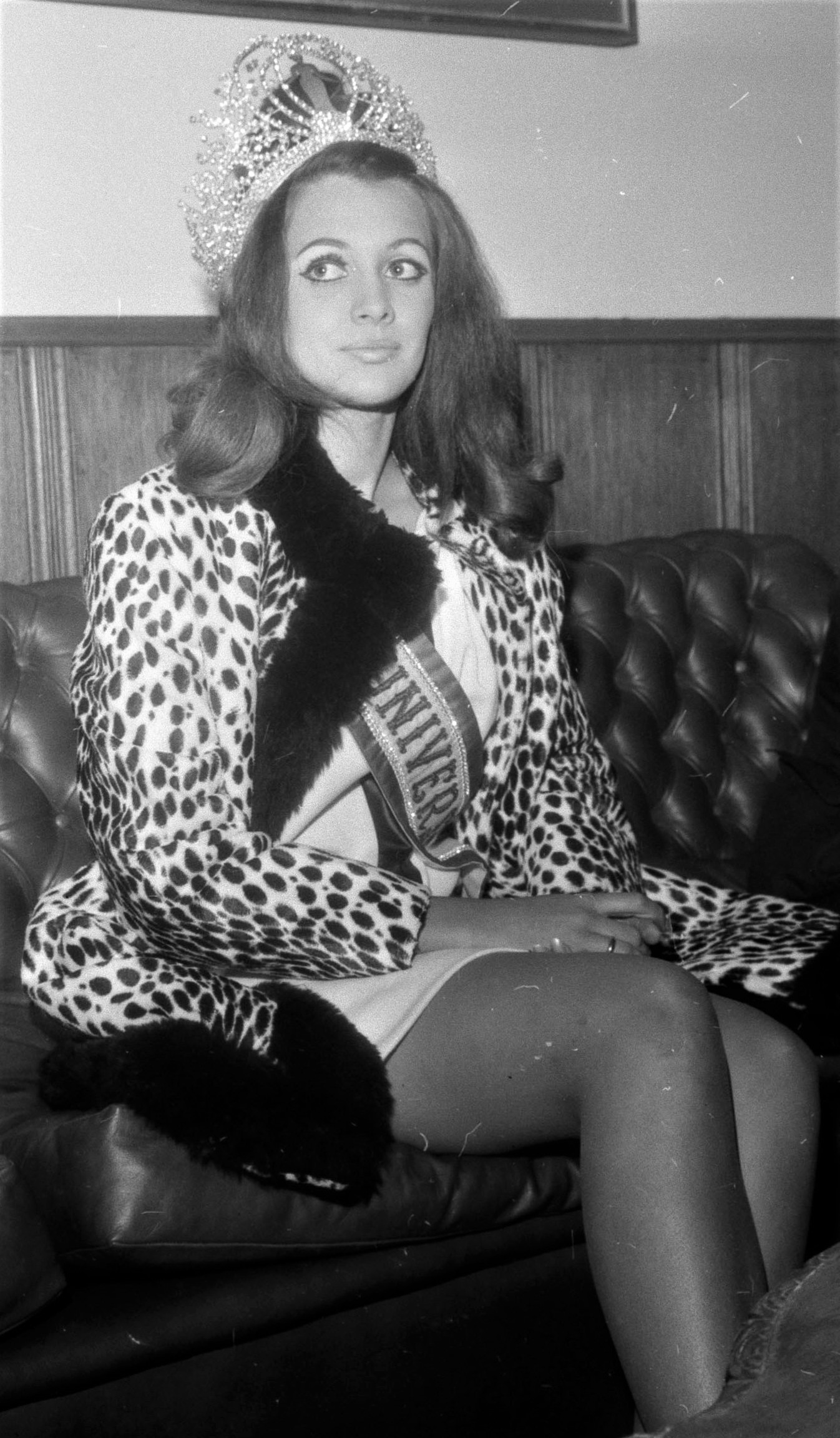
Miss Brazil 1968
Martha Vasconcellos

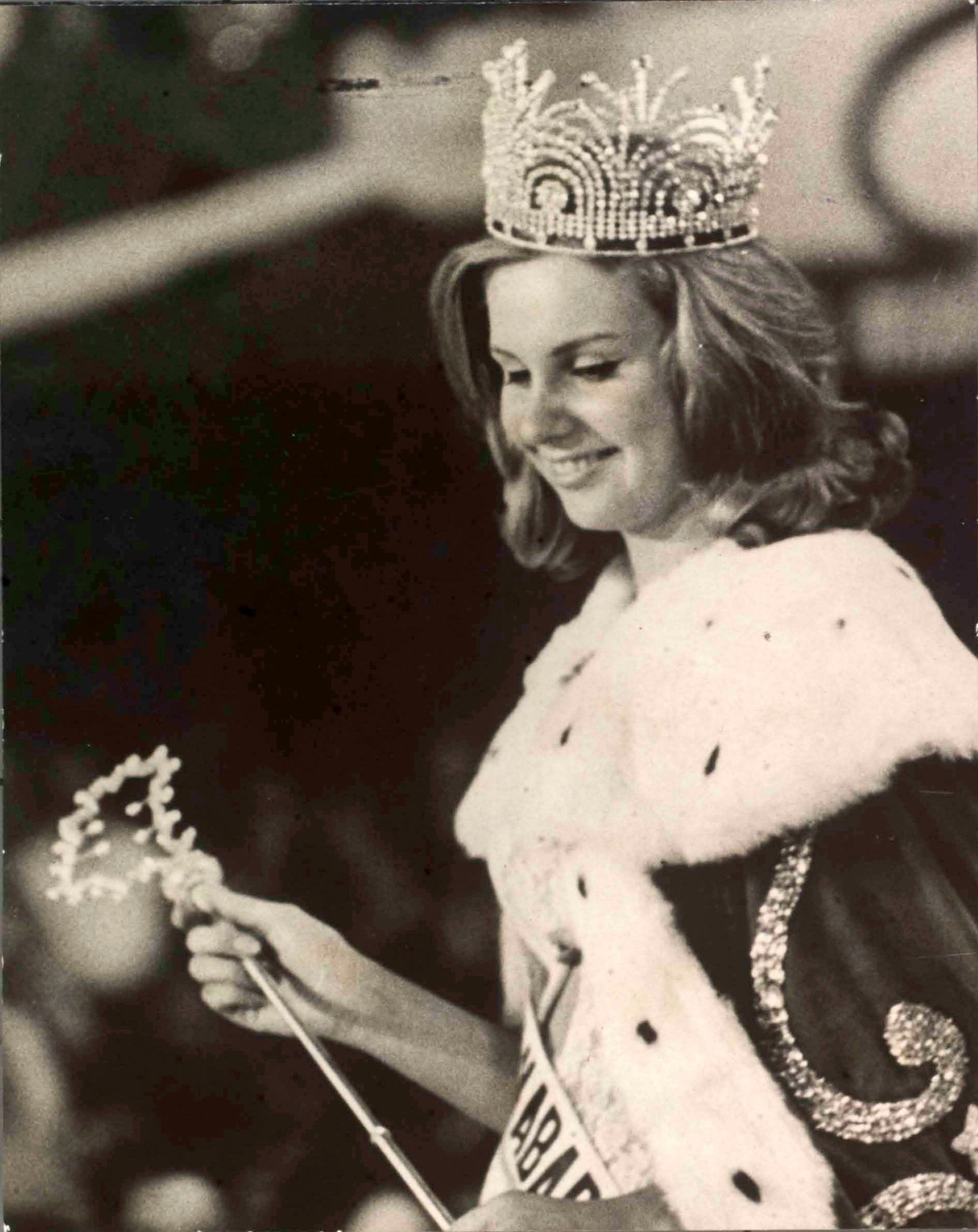
Miss Brazil 1965
Maria Raquel de Andrade

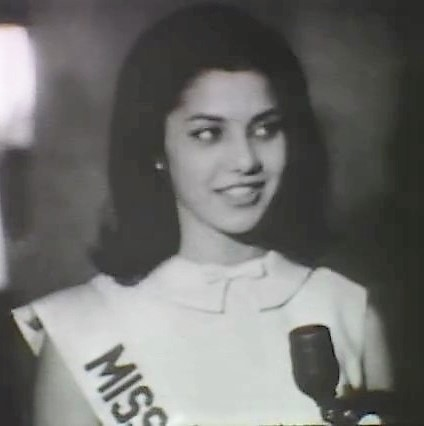
Miss Brazil 1963
Iêda Maria Vargas

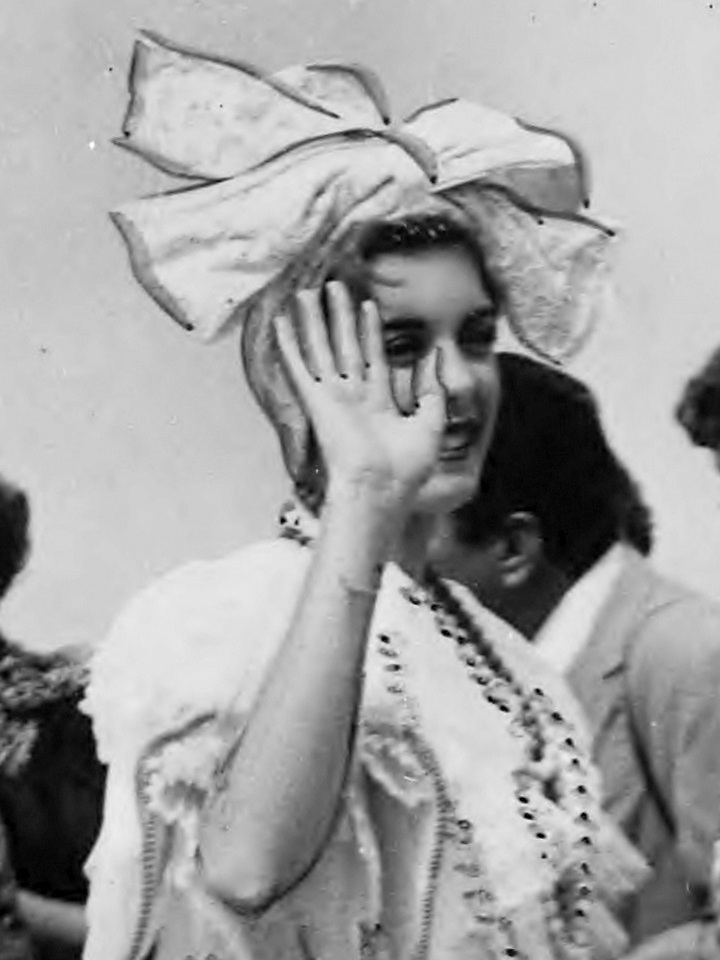
Miss Brazil 1959
Vera Ribeiro

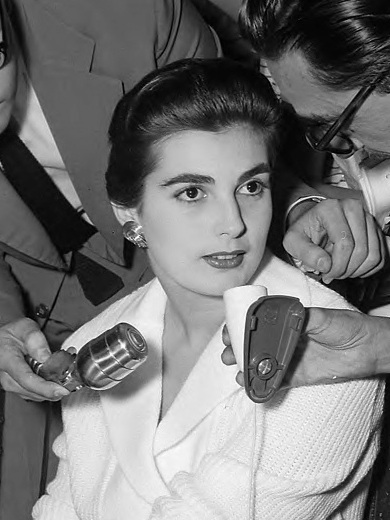
Miss Brazil 1958
Adalgisa Colombo

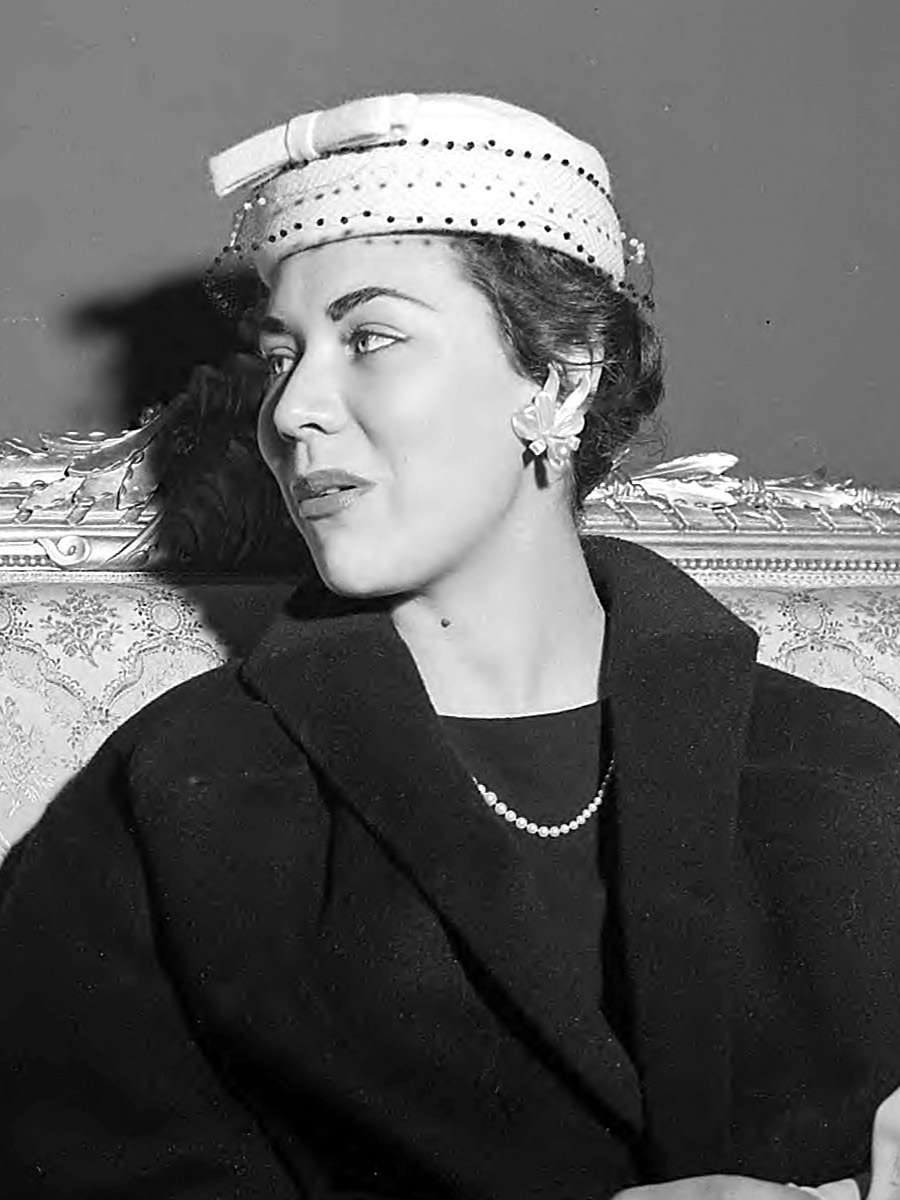
Miss Brazil 1956
Maria José Cardoso

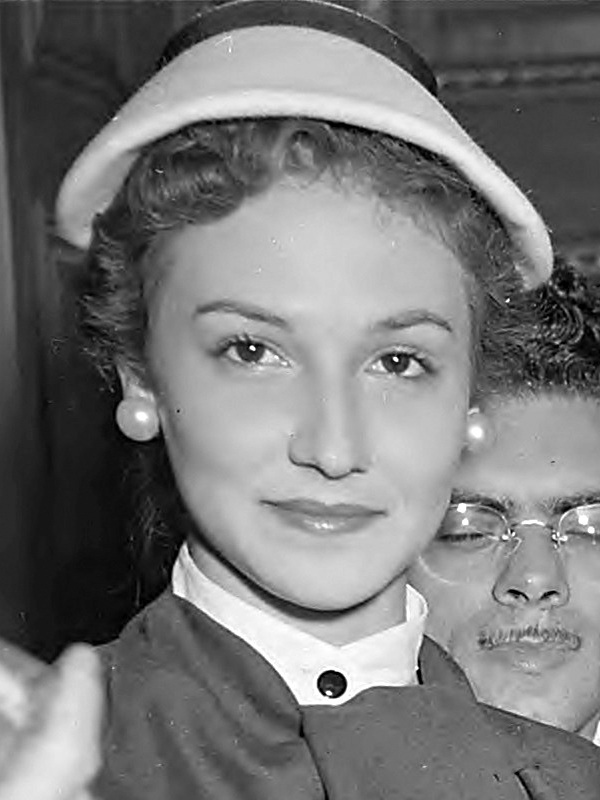
Miss Brazil 1955
Emília Barreto

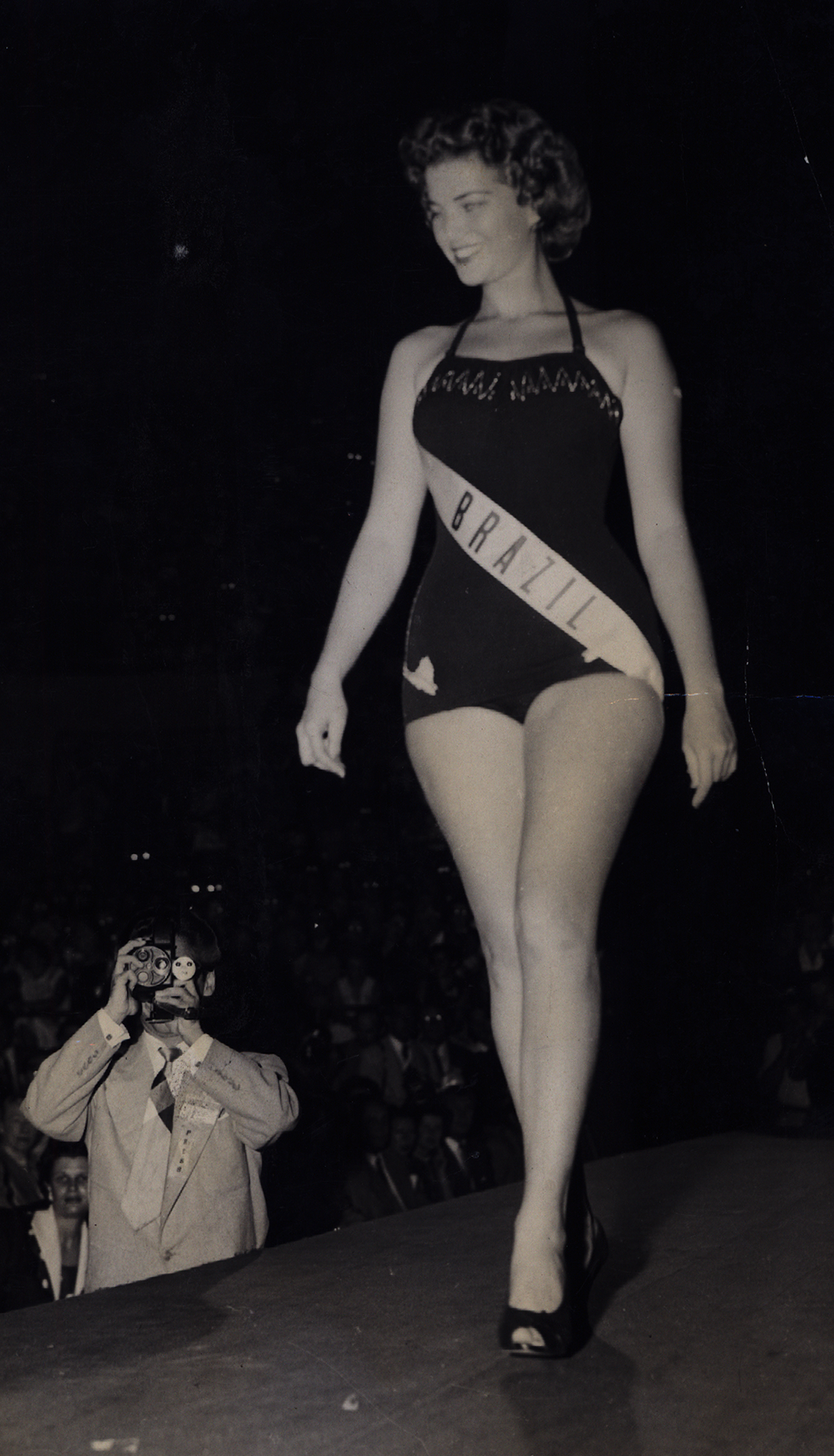
Miss Brazil 1954
Martha Rocha

=== Winners by state ===
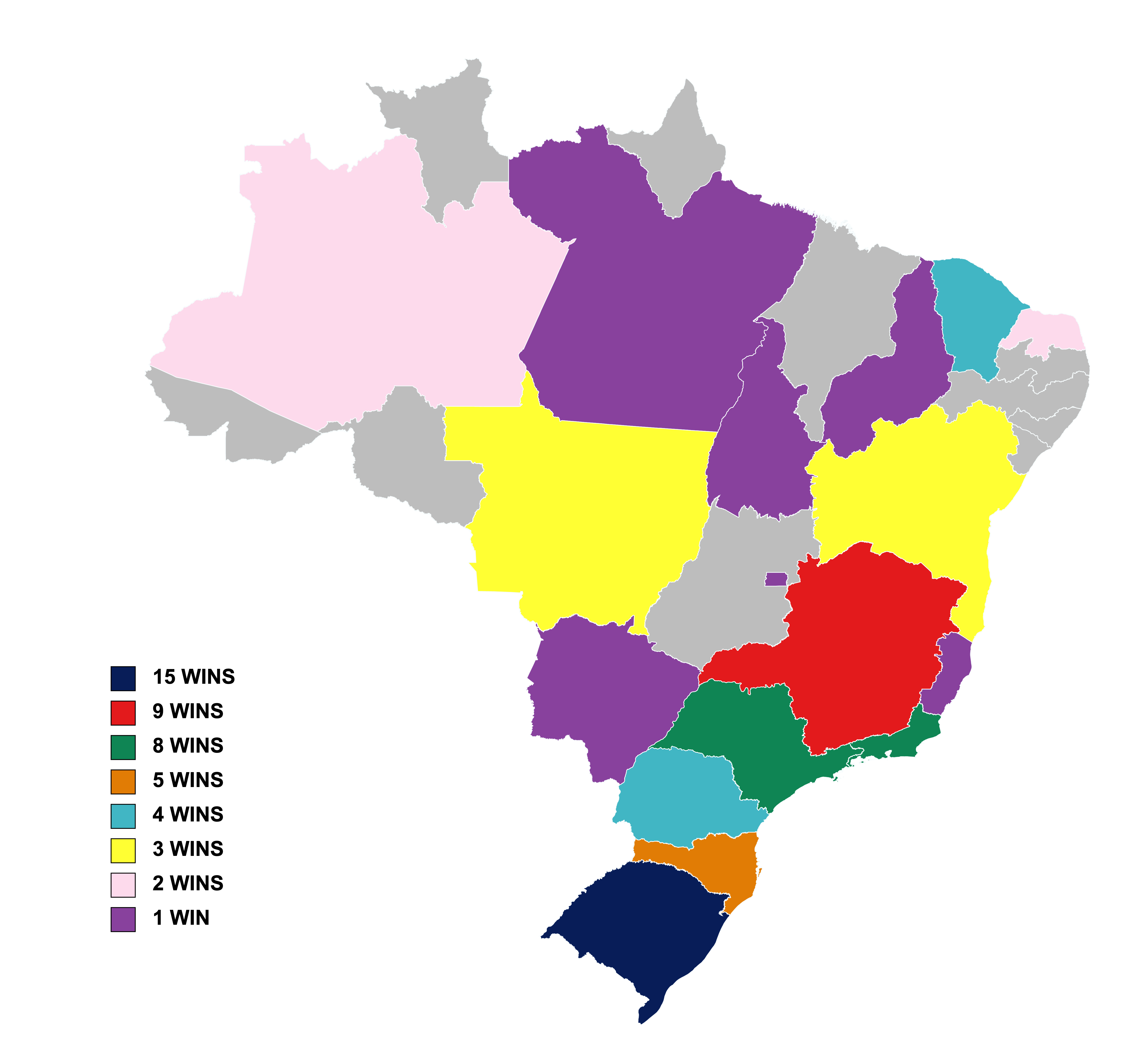
Miss Brazil winners by state (Note: Map includes titleholders who were dethroned or resigned and runners-up who assumed the title after the original winner was dethroned or resigned)

Number	State	Years
15	Rio Grande do Sul	1956; 1963; 1972; 1986; 1993; 1999; 2001; 2004; 2006; 2008; 2011; 2012; 2015; 2020; 2023
9	Minas Gerais	1961; 1971; 1978; 1983; 1995; 1997; 2007; 2010; 2019
8	São Paulo	1967; 1973; 1974; 1976; 1977; 1984; 1991; 1994
8	Rio de Janeiro (Note: Until 1960, portions of Rio de Janeiro were administered under the Federal District of Brazil at the time, which was the city of Rio de Janeiro, and titleholders who represented Distrito Federal (Rio de Janeiro) are included here.) (Note: Until 1975, portions of Rio de Janeiro were administered under the state of Guanabara, and titleholders who represented Guanabara are included here.)	1958; 1959; 1960; 1965; 1966; 1970; 1980; 1981
5	Santa Catarina	1969; 1975; 1988; 2002 (Note: In 2002, winner Joseane Oliveira of Rio Grande do Sul was dethroned after it was revealed that she was married at the time of her crowning. She was replaced as Miss Brazil by her first runner-up, Taíza Thömsen of Santa Catarina.); 2005
5	Paraná	1964; 1992; 1996; 2016; 2026
4	Ceará	1955; 1989; 2014; 2021
3	Mato Grosso	1985; 2000; 2013
3	Bahia	1954; 1962; 1968
2	Piauí	2017; 2025
2	Amazonas	1957; 2018
2	Rio Grande do Norte	1979; 2009
1	Pernambuco	2024
1	Espírito Santo	2022
1	Tocantins	2003
1	Mato Grosso do Sul	1998
1	Distrito Federal	1987
1	Pará	1982
