= Miss Ceará =

Brazilian beauty pageant in Ceará

Miss Ceará Miss Universe Ceará
- Formation: 1955
- Type: Beauty pageant
- Headquarters: Ceará, Brazil
- Members: Miss Brazil
- Official language: Portuguese
- State Directors: Valéria Mannarino and Guilhermino Benevides

Miss Ceará is a Brazilian Beauty pageant which selects the representative for the State of Ceará at the Miss Brazil contest. The pageant was created in 1955 and has been held every year since with the exception of 1990–1991, 1993, and 2020. The pageant is held annually with representation of several municipalities. Since 2018, the State directors for Miss Ceará are Valéria Mannarino and Guilhermino Benevides. Ceará has won four crowns in the national contest.

The following women from who competed as Miss Ceará have won Miss Brazil:

- Emília Barreto Corrêa Lima, from Sobral, in 1955
- Flávia Cavalcanti, from Fortaleza, in 1989
- Melissa Holanda Gurgel, from Maracanaú, in 2014
- Teresa Stela Barbosa Silva Santos, from Maranguape, in 2021

== Gallery of Titleholders ==
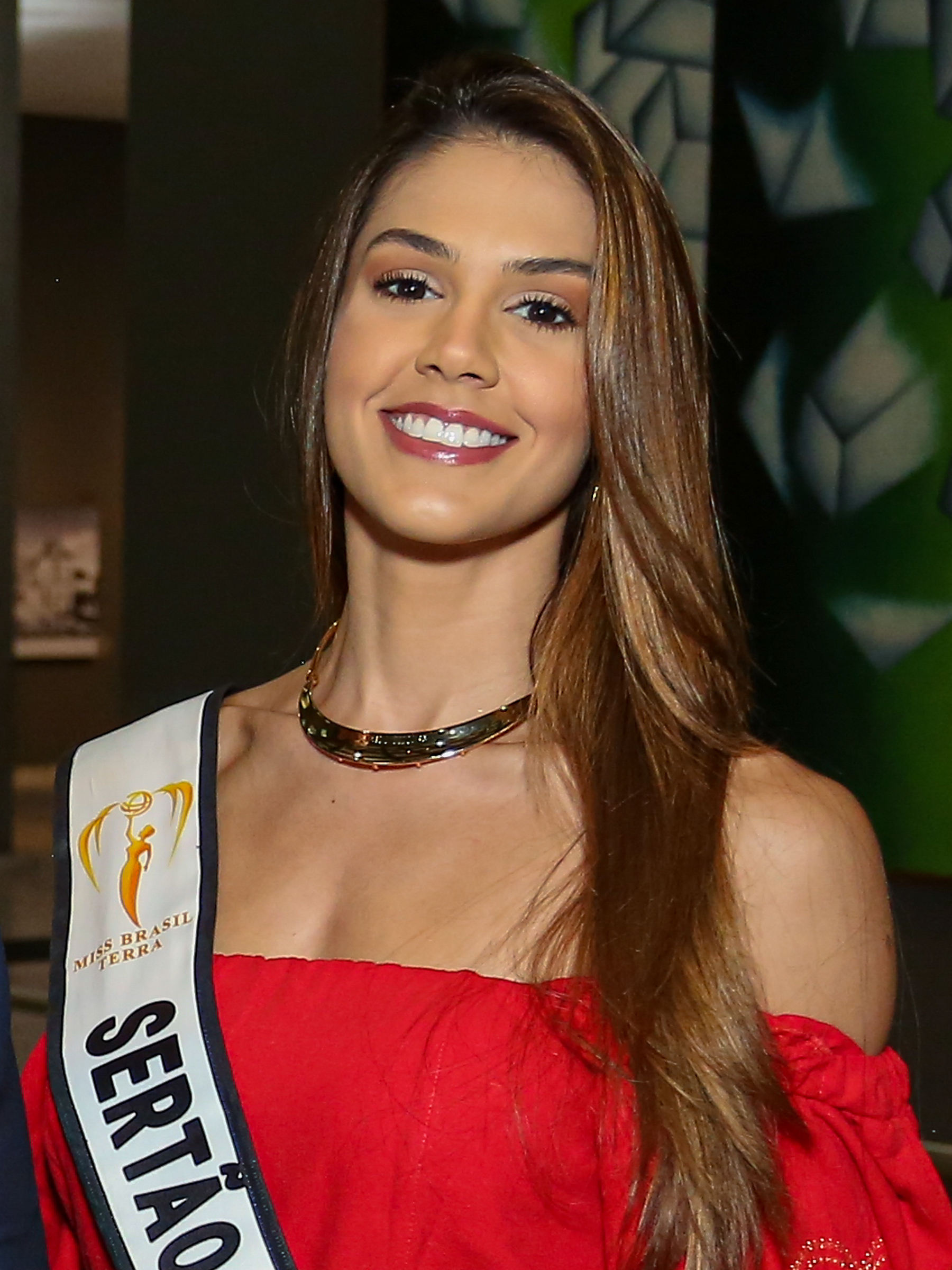
Miss Ceará 2016
Morgana Carlos

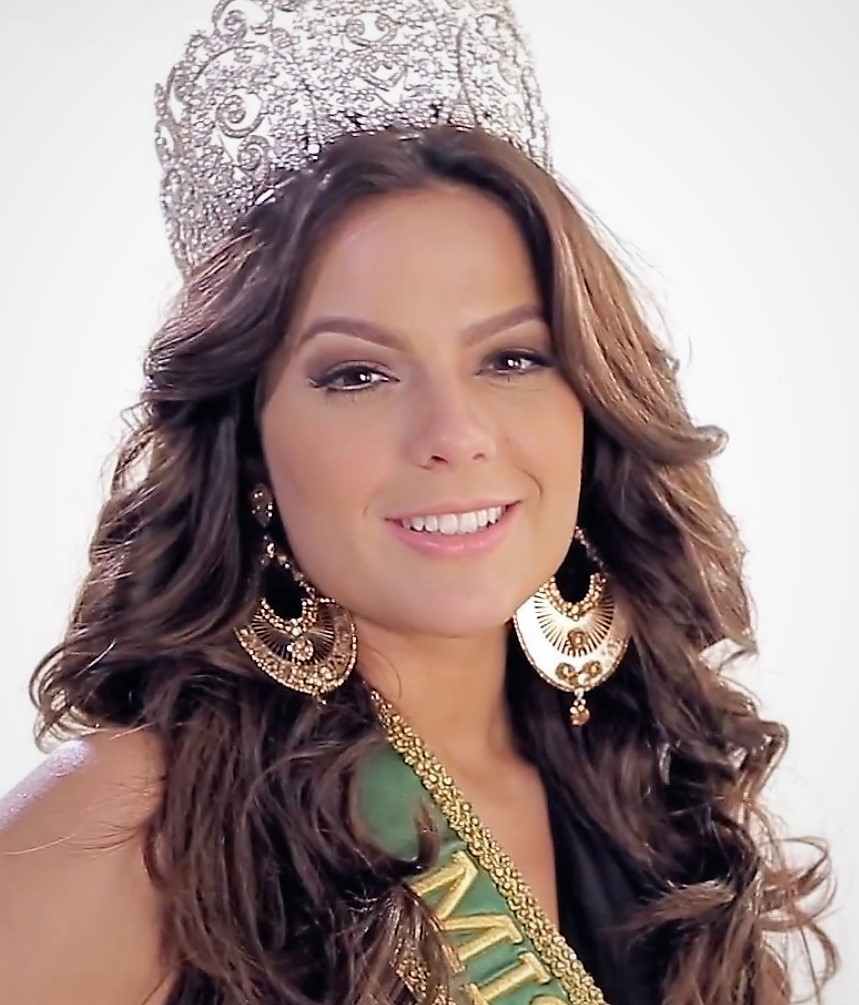
Miss Ceará 2014, and Miss Brazil 2014
Melissa Holanda Gurgel

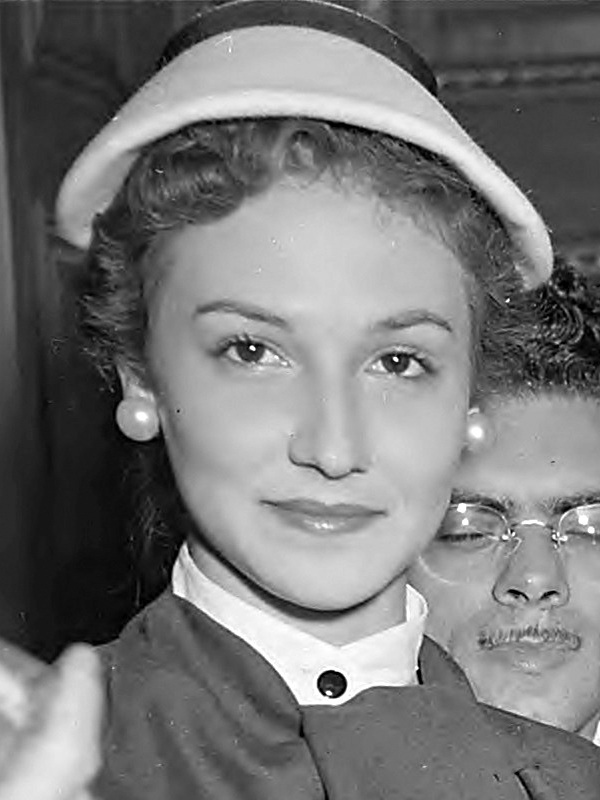
Miss Ceará 1955, and Miss Brazil 1955
Emília Barreto Corrêa Lima

== Results summary ==
=== Placements ===
- Miss Brazil: Emília Barreto Corrêa Lima (1955); Flávia Cavalcanti (1989); Melissa Holanda Gurgel (2014); Teresa Stela Barbosa Silva Santos (2021)
- 1st Runner-Up: Andréa Ferreira (1992); Vanessa Lima Vidal (2008); Luana Carvalho Lobo (2019)
- 2nd Runner-Up: Francy Nogueira (1966); Teresa Santos (2018)
- 3rd Runner-Up: Mazu Holanda (1956); Lia Guimarães (1957); Elza Laureano (1961); Luana Carvalho Lobo (2022)
- 4th Runner-Up: Khrisley Karlen (2009); Luana Carvalho Lobo (2020)
- Top 5/Top 7/Top 8/Top 9: Rita Nóbrega (1962); Ana Carvalhedo (1964); Vera Lúcia Camelo (1969); Ana Maria Kerth (1972); Morgana Carlos (2016)
- Top 10/Top 11/Top 12: Tânia Mara Piccoli (1982); Ana Cláudia Soares (1983); Luzia Miglioranzi (1985); Deusa Guerra (1986); Germana Gaspar (1998); Milena Ferrer (2012); Mariana Vasconcelos (2013); Aléxia Duarte (2017)
- Top 14/Top 15/Top 16: Anastácia Duarte (2011); Beatriz Moreira Militão (2023); Bruna Ramos del Nero (2025)

=== Special awards ===
- Miss Congeniality: Cláudia Saraiva (1967); Roseli de Lima (1973); Jacqueline Buarque (1975); Jacqueline Gaspar (2003)
- Best State Costume: Carla Rocha (2006)
- Miss Popular Vote: Vanessa Lima Vidal (2008)
- Miss Be Emotion: Aléxia Duarte (2017)

== Titleholders ==
Year	Name	Age (Note: Ages at the time of the pageant)	Height	Represented	Miss Brazil placement	Notes
Miss Universe Ceará
2026	Leila Carvalho	23	1.75 m (5 ft 9 in)	Horizonte	TBD	
2025	Bruna Ramos del Nero	39		Fortaleza	Top 14	
2024	Kellen Alves	30	1.67 m (5 ft 5 1/2 in)	Fortaleza		
2023	Beatriz Moreira Militão	25	1.72 m (5 ft 7 1/2 in)	Trairi	Top 16	
2022	Luana Carvalho Lobo	27	1.73 m (5 ft 8 in)	Fortaleza	3rd Runner-Up	Previously crowned Miss Ceará Be Emotion 2019, then placed 1st Runner-Up at Miss Brazil 2019 and was placed as 4th Alternative/Runner-Up at Miss Brazil 2020.
2021	Teresa Stela Barbosa Silva Santos	23	1.72 m (5 ft 7 1/2 in)	Maranguape	Miss Brazil 2021	Previously crowned Miss Ceará Be Emotion 2018 and placed 2nd Runner-Up at Miss Brazil 2018. Competed at Miss Universe 2021.
U Miss Ceará 2020 and Miss Ceará Be Emotion 2020
2020	Luana Carvalho Lobo	25	1.73 m (5 ft 8 in)	Maracanaú	4th Alternative/Runner-Up	No national Miss Brazil contest due to the COVID-19 pandemic and change in the national franchise holder which caused the national titleholder to be appointed.
Miss Ceará Be Emotion
2019	Luana Carvalho Lobo	24	1.73 m (5 ft 8 in)	Maracanaú	1st Runner-Up	Later became Miss Universe Ceará 2022, then placed 3rd Runner-Up at Miss Brazil 2022 and placed as 4th Alternative/Runner-Up at Miss Brazil 2020. Last Miss Miss Ceará Be Emotion
2018	Teresa Stela Barbosa Silva Santos	19	1.71 m (5 ft 7 1/2 in)	Groaíras	2nd Runner-Up	Later became Miss Universe Ceará 2021 and won Miss Brazil 2021.
2017	Aléxia Duarte	21	1.80 m (5 ft 11 in)	Fortaleza	Top 10	Also won Miss Be Emotion.
2016	Morgana Carlos	20	1.72 m (5 ft 7 1/2 in)	Quixadá	Top 5	
2015	Arianne Miranda	24	1.78 m (5 ft 10 in)	Horizonte		
Miss Ceará Universe
2014	Melissa Holanda Gurgel	20	1.68 m (5 ft 6 in)	Maracanaú	Miss Brazil 2014	Top 15 at Miss Universe 2014.
2013	Mariana Vasconcelos	23	1.72 m (5 ft 7 1/2 in)	Fortaleza	Top 10	
2012	Milena Lemos do Monte Ferrer	20	1.79 m (5 ft 10 1/2 in)	Guaraciaba do Norte	Top 10	
Miss Ceará
2011	Anastácia Line Alves Duarte			Fortaleza	Top 15	
2010	Eugênia Justino Barbosa	23		Crato		
2009	Khrisley Karlen Gonçalves da Silva			Pacajus	4th Runner-Up	
2008	Vanessa Lima Vidal			Clube dos Diários	1st Runner-Up	Also won Miss Popular Vote.
2007	Raphaella Benevides			Mombaça		
2006	Carla Medeiros Rocha		1.69 m (5 ft 6 1/2 in)	Juazeiro do Norte		Won Best State Costume.
2005	Daniela Amaral Silva			Limoeiro do Norte		
2004	Jorlene Rodrigues Cordeiro			Fortaleza		
2003	Jacqueline Gaspar de Oliveira Carneiro			Fortaleza		Won Miss Congenitality. Became Miss Ceará after the original winner was dethroned.
2003	Rebeca Pimentel	17		Fortaleza	Did not compete	Was not allowed to compete for Miss Brazil due to being underage.
2002	Andréia Batista Monteiro			Barbalha		
2001	Orleide Ferreira Castro			Barbalha		
2000	Wanuska Aguiar Dantas			Crato		
1999	Geisa Jinkings de Oliveira			Fortaleza		
1998	Germana Gaspar			Fortaleza	Top 12	
1997	Roselane Cândida Lima			Fortaleza		
1996	Mônica do Rêgo Matias			Maracanaú		
1995	Maria de Lourdes Silva			Horizonte		
1994	Synara Barroso			Fortaleza		
1993	No delegate sent in 1993 due to Miss Brazil 1993 being appointed rather than having a contest.					
1992	Andréa Ferreira			Fortaleza	1st Runner-Up	
1991	No delegate sent in 1991.					
1990	No contest in 1990.					
1989	Flávia Cavalcanti	20	1.73 m (5 ft 8 in)	Fortaleza	Miss Brazil 1989	Competed at Miss Universe 1989.
1988	Joana D'Arc Maia			Maranguape		
1987	Marta Pessoa			Fortaleza		
1986	Deusa Guerra			Fortaleza	Top 12	
1985	Luzia Miglioranzi			Fortaleza	Top 12	
1984	Zeilma Loiola			Sobral		
1983	Ana Cláudia Soares			Fortaleza	Top 12	
1982	Tânia Mara Piccoli			Clube das Casas Pernambucanas	Top 12	
1981	Glória Virgínia Chaves			Itapipoca		
1980	Maria das Dores Neves			AABEC		
1979	Aracília Arruda			Crateús		
1978	Aparecida Carvalho			Clube de Regatas Barra do Ceará	Did not compete	Became Miss Ceará after the original winner resigned.
1978	Zuleika Zardo			Ceará Country Club		Resigned after competing in Miss Brazil.
1977	Maria Luiza Holanda			Clube de Regatas Barra do Ceará		
1976	Imaculada Cicarelli			Clube Bradesco		
1975	Jacqueline Buarque			Colégio Batista Santos Dumont		Won Miss Congenitality.
1974	Elizabeth Gomes			Náutico Atlético Cearense		
1973	Roseli de Lima			Escola Doméstica São Rafael		Won Miss Congenitality.
1972	Ana Maria Kerth			Clubes de Fortaleza	Top 8	
1971	Aldenora Nogueira			Quixeramobim		
1970	Tânia Mara Tavares			Comercial Clube		
1969	Vera Lúcia Camelo			Clube Iracema	Top 8	
1968	Vera Maria Veras			Clube dos Diários		
1967	Cláudia Saraiva			Náutico Atlético Cearense		Won Miss Congenitality.
1966	Maria Cláudia Maciel			União dos Clubes Suburbanos	Did not compete	Became Miss Ceará after the original winner resigned.
1966	Francy Nogueira			Crato		Resigned after competing in Miss Brazil.
1965	Ana Clara Ferreira			Círculo Militar	Did not compete	Became Miss Ceará after the original winner resigned.
1965	Iassodara Cavalcante			Clube dos Diários		Resigned after competing in Miss Brazil.
1964	Ana Carvalhedo			Comercial Clube	Top 9	
1963	Vera Lúcia Maia			Fortaleza Esporte Clube		
1962	Rita Nóbrega			Associação Atlética Banco do Brasil	Top 8	
1961	Elza Laureano			Clube Iracema • Clube Náutico	3rd Runner-Up	
1960	Wanda Medeiros			Crato		
1959	Airtes Arruda			Sobral	Did not compete	Became Miss Ceará after the original winner resigned.
1959	Rufina Braga			Clube Iracema		Resigned after competing in Miss Brazil.
1958	Maria Sanford			Sobral		
1957	Lia Guimarães			Clube Massapeense	3rd Runner-Up	
1956	Mazu Holanda			Clube dos Diários	3rd Runner-Up	
1955	Emília Barreto Corrêa Lima	18	1.71 m (5 ft 7 1/2 in)	Sport Club Maguari	Miss Brazil 1955	Top 15 at Miss Universe 1955.
1954	No delegate sent in 1954 as the contest didn't exist until 1955.					
