= Sobral Regional Airport =

Sobral Luciano de Arruda Coelho Regional Airport Aeroporto Regional de Sobral Luciano de Arruda Coelho
- IATA: JSO; ICAO: SN6L; LID: CE0164

Summary
- Airport type: Public
- Operator: Infraero (2023–2025); Visac Aeroportos (2025-present)
- Serves: Sobral
- Opened: 1 April 2022; 4 years ago
- Time zone: BRT (UTC−03:00)
- Elevation AMSL: 91 m (299 ft)
- Coordinates: 03°36′53″S 040°13′56″W
- Website: www4.infraero.gov.br/aeroporto-sobral/

Map
- Location in Brazil

Runways
Direction	Length		Surface
Direction	m	ft	Surface
10/28	1,800	5,906	Asphalt

Statistics (2024)
- Passengers: 2,497
- Aircraft Operations: 1,243
- Metric tonnes of cargo: 4
- Statistics: Infraero; Sources: Airport Website, ANAC, DECEA

Sobral Luciano de Arruda Coelho Regional Airport (IATA: JSO, ICAO: SN6L), is the airport serving Sobral, Brazil.

It is managed by contract by Visac Aeroportos.

== History ==
The airport opened on April 1, 2022. It replaced the former airport of Sobral, Cel. Virgílio Távora Airport.

Previously operated by Infraero, on April 22, 2025 the State of Ceará signed a one-year contract of operation with Visac Aeroportos.

== Access ==
The airport is located 25 km (16 mi) from downtown Sobral.

== See also ==
- List of airports in Brazil
