= Sobral Airport =

Cel. Virgílio Távora Airport Aeroporto Cel. Virgílio Távora
- IATA: QBX; ICAO: SNOB; LID: CE0013

Summary
- Airport type: Public
- Serves: Sobral
- Time zone: BRT (UTC−03:00)
- Elevation AMSL: 64 m (210 ft)
- Coordinates: 03°40′44″S 040°20′12″W

Map
- Location in Brazil

Runways
Direction	Length		Surface
Direction	m	ft	Surface
10/28	1,033	3,389	Asphalt
- Sources: ANAC, DECEA

Sobral Public Airport, named after Cel. Virgílio Távora Airport (IATA: QBX, ICAO: SNOB), is an airport serving Sobral, Brazil.

== History ==
The airport ceased to receive commercial flights on February 26, 2023. Those flights now operate at Luciano de Arruda Coelho Airport.

The following airline once served the airport: Azul Conecta.

== Access ==
The airport was located 2 km (1 mi) from downtown Sobral.

== See also ==
- List of airports in Brazil
