= Vanessa Lima Vidal =

Brazilian model, beauty pageant contestant and beach volleyball player (born 1984)

Vanessa Vidal
- Born: Vanessa Lima Vidal; March 3, 1984 (age 42); Fortaleza, Ceará, Brazil
- Other name: Vanessa Vidal
- Beauty pageant titleholder
- Hair color: Brown
- Eye color: Black
- Major competition: Miss Brasilia (2008) runners-up

Vanessa Lima Vidal also simply known as Vanessa Vidal (born 3 March 1984) is a Brazilian volleyball player, model and beauty pageant titleholder.

== Career ==
Vidal was the first deaf beauty pageant contestant to compete at the Miss Brasil in 2008. Vanessa Vidal is also a national deaf beach volleyball player and has competed at the 2013 Summer Deaflympics representing the national deaf beach volleyball team.

She received more publicity and fame as the only deaf entrant in the Miss Brasil pageant contest among the hearing in 2008 and emerged as first runner-up. She also became only the third candidate to participate in Miss International as a Deaf person in competing in the Miss International 2008 contest after two other Deaf contestants Sophie Vouzelaud of France and Vanessa Peretti of Venezuela.
