= Melissa Gurgel =

Brazilian model (born 1994)

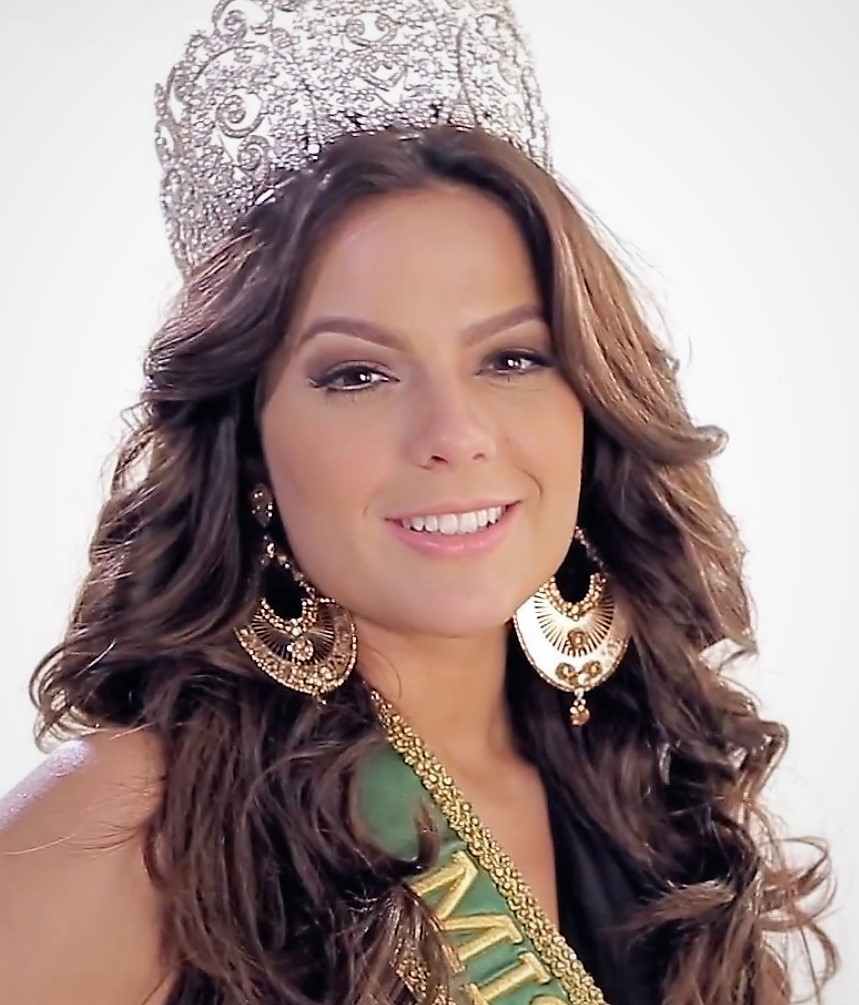
- Gurgel
- Born: Melissa Holanda Gurgel; June 3, 1994 (age 32); Fortaleza, Ceará, Brazil
- Height: 5 ft 6 in (1.68 m)
- Beauty pageant titleholder
- Hair color: Brown
- Eye color: Brown
- Major competitions: Miss Maracanaú 2014 (Winner); Miss Ceará 2014 (Winner); Miss Brazil 2014 (Winner); Miss Universe 2014 (Top 15)

Melissa Holanda Gurgel (born June 3, 1994) is a Brazilian designer, model and beauty pageant titleholder who was crowned Miss Brasil 2014 and represented her country at Miss Universe 2014.

== Early life ==
Gurgel is working as model and majoring in fashion and design studies.

== Pageantry ==
=== Miss Brasil 2014 ===
Gurgel was crowned as Miss Brasil 2014 and represented Ceará. The 60th annual Miss Brasil pageant was held at Centro de Eventos do Ceará, Fortaleza, on September 27, 2014. Meanwhile, at the same event Miss São Paulo and Miss Rio Grande de Norte were crowned as the runners-up respectively. The 2nd Runner-up, Deise Benício of Rio Grande do Norte competed at Miss International 2014.

=== Miss Universe 2014 ===
Gurgel represented her country in the Miss Universe 2014 pageant where she placed among the Top 15.

Awards and achievements
Preceded by (Mato Grosso) Jakelyne Oliveira	Miss Brazil; 2014	Succeeded by (Rio Grande do Sul) Marthina Brandt
Preceded by Mariana Vasconcelos	Miss Ceará; 2014	Succeeded by Arianne Miranda
