= Mia Mamede =

Brazilian model and beauty pageant titleholder, Miss Brazil 2022 winner

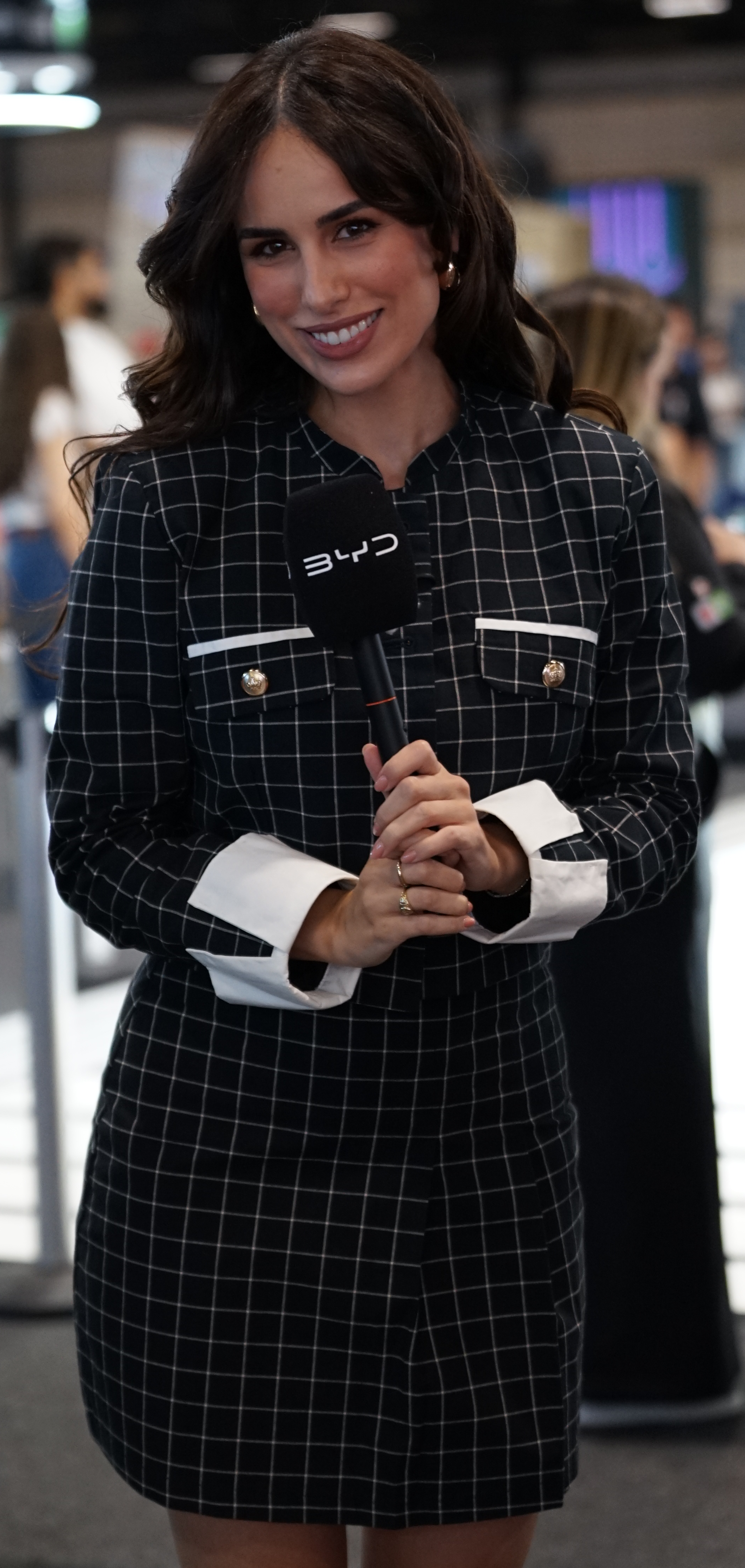
- Mia Mamede in 2025
- Born: Maria Eugênia Mamede; 24 October 1995 (age 30); Vitória, Espírito Santo, Brazil
- Education: New York University (BA)
- Occupations: Journalist; Producer
- Height: 1.72 m (5 ft 7 1/2 in)
- Beauty pageant titleholder
- Title: Miss Espírito Santo 2022; Miss Brazil 2022
- Hair color: Brown
- Eye color: Brown
- Major competitions: Miss Brazil 2022 (Winner); Miss Universe 2022 (Unplaced)

Maria Eugênia "Mia" Mamede (born 24 October 1995) is a Brazilian model, actress and beauty pageant titleholder who was crowned 67th Miss Universe Brasil and was the first woman from her state (Espírito Santo) to win Miss Brazil. As Miss Brazil, Mamede represented Brazil at the Miss Universe 2022 competition.

== Pageantry ==
=== Miss Brazil 2022 ===
Mamede represented Vitória in the 2022 Miss Espírito Santo competition, and went on to win the title. As Miss Espírito Santo, Mamede received the right to represent Espírito Santo at the Miss Brazil 2022 pageant on July 19, 2022. In the competition, Mamede advanced to the top sixteen, then the top ten, and ultimately the top five. At the end of the event, Mamede went on to win the competition and was crowned as Miss Universe Brazil 2022 by outgoing titleholder Teresa Santos of Ceará, becoming the first woman from Espírito Santo to win Miss Brazil.

=== Miss Universe 2022 ===
Mamede represented Brazil at the Miss Universe 2022 competition on 14 January 2022 but was unplaced.

Awards and achievements
Preceded by Eduarda Braum	Miss Espírito Santo; 2022	Succeeded by Anna Beatriz Pereira de Souza
Preceded by (Ceará) Teresa Santos	Miss Brazil; 2022	Succeeded by (Rio Grande do Sul) Maria Brechane
