= Miss Brazil 2019 =

- Date: 9 March 2019
- Presenters: Cassio Reis; Marthina Brandt; Raissa Santana; Monalysa Alcântara; Mayra Dias
- Venue: Sao Paulo Expo Exhibition & Convention Center, São Paulo
- Broadcaster: Rede Bandeirantes
- Entrants: 27
- Placements: 15
- Winner: Júlia Horta; Minas Gerais

Miss Brazil 2019 (Portuguese: Miss Brasil 2019), officially Miss Brazil Be Emotion 2019 (Portuguese: Miss Brasil Be Emotion 2019), was the 65th edition of the Miss Brazil beauty pageant which was held on 9 March 2019 at São Paulo Expo Exhibition & Convention Center in the city of São Paulo, Brazil. The event was broadcast by Rede Bandeirantes network nationally. 27 candidates from all the each States of Brazil and the Federal District participated in the pageant. At the end of the event, Mayra Dias of Amazonas crowned Júlia Horta of Minas Gerais as her successor. Horta represented Brazil at Miss Universe 2019 pageant and placed Top 20.

== Results ==
Result	Contestant
Miss Brazil 2019	Minas Gerais – Júlia Horta
1st Runner-up	Ceará – Luana Lobo
2nd Runner-up	São Paulo – Bianca Lopes
Top 5	Rio Grande do Norte – Erika Fontes; Rio Grande do Sul – Bianca Scheren
Top 10	Amazonas – Lorena Alencar; Espírito Santo – Thainá Castro; Piauí – Dagmara Landim; Santa Catarina – Patricia Marafon; Tocantins – Alessandra Almeida
Top 15	Federal District – Gabriela Borges; Paraíba – Kennya Araújo; Paraná – Djenifer Frey; Roraima – Natali Vitoria; Sergipe – Ingrid Moraes

=== Challenge events ===
Challenge	Winner
Best Speech	Minas Gerais - Júlia Horta
Miss Brazil History Quiz	São Paulo - Bianca Lopes
Best in Fashion Clothes	Ceará - Luana Lobo

=== Miss Internet ===
Result	Contestant
Winner	Minas Gerais - Júlia Horta

=== Special Award ===
Award	Winner
Miss BE Emotion	Minas Gerais - Júlia Horta

== Contestants ==
The following is the list of the official delegates of Miss Brazil 2019 representing each states of the country:

Representing	Delegate	Age	Height	Hometown
(Acre (state)) Acre	Sayonara Moura	25	1.75 m (5 ft 9 in)	Rio Branco
Alagoas	Raíssa de Souza	26	1.75 m (5 ft 9 in)	Rio Largo
Amapá	Brenda Lazareth	22	1.74 m (5 ft 8 1/2 in)	Santana
(Amazonas (Brazilian state)) Amazonas	Lorena Alencar	26	1.74 m (5 ft 8 1/2 in)	Manaus
Bahia	Liliane Natiele	25	1.75 m (5 ft 9 in)	Feira de Santana
Ceará	Luana Lobo	24	1.73 m (5 ft 8 in)	Maracanaú
Espírito Santo	Thainá Castro	24	1.75 m (5 ft 9 in)	Vitória
(Federal District (Brazil)) Federal District	Ana Gabriela Borges	21	1.75 m (5 ft 9 in)	Brasília
Goiás	Isadora Dantas	22	1.73 m (5 ft 8 in)	Aparecida de Goiânia
Maranhão	Anna Carolina Sousa	24	1.78 m (5 ft 10 in)	Itapecuru Mirim
Mato Grosso	Ingrid Santin	25	1.78 m (5 ft 10 in)	Rondonópolis
Mato Grosso do Sul	Priscilla Vacchiano	24	1.76 m (5 ft 9 1/2 in)	Campo Grande
Minas Gerais	Júlia Horta	24	1.72 m (5 ft 7 1/2 in)	Juiz de Fora
Pará	Wilma Paulino	19	1.78 m (5 ft 10 in)	Itaituba
Paraíba	Kennya Araújo	26	1.71 m (5 ft 7 1/2 in)	João Pessoa
(Paraná (state)) Paraná	Djenifer Frey	20	1.80 m (5 ft 11 in)	Missal
Pernambuco	Bárbara Souza	22	1.79 m (5 ft 10 1/2 in)	Recife
Piauí	Dagmara Landim	22	1.77 m (5 ft 9 1/2 in)	São Raimundo Nonato
(Rio de Janeiro (state)) Rio de Janeiro	Isadora Meira	26	1.75 m (5 ft 9 in)	Barra Mansa
Rio Grande do Norte	Erika Fontes	24	1.76 m (5 ft 9 1/2 in)	Monte Alegre
Rio Grande do Sul	Bianca Scheren	20	1.75 m (5 ft 9 in)	Estrela
Rondônia	Hunaide Horitham	23	1.68 m (5 ft 6 in)	Ji-Paraná
Roraima	Natali Vitoria	19	1.68 m (5 ft 6 in)	Pacaraima
(Santa Catarina (state)) Santa Catarina	Patricia Marafon	25	1.70 m (5 ft 7 in)	Florianópolis
(São Paulo (state)) São Paulo	Bianca Lopes	22	1.68 m (5 ft 6 in)	Jaú
Sergipe	Ingrid Moraes	24	1.76 m (5 ft 9 1/2 in)	Barra dos Coqueiros
Tocantins	Alessandra Almeida	19	1.77 m (5 ft 9 1/2 in)	Tocantinópolis

== Judges ==
=== Preliminary ===
- Karina Ades – Miss Brazil national director
- Daniele da Mata – Businesswoman and beauty artist
- Priscila Prade – Photographer

=== Finals ===
- Alexandre Herchcovitch - Stylist
- Marcos Proença - Beauty stylist
- Wanderley Nunes - Beauty stylist
- Luíza Brunet - Businesswoman, activist, and model
- Rachel Maia - CEO of Lacoste
- Natália Guimarães - Businesswoman and Miss Brasil 2007 from Minas Gerais
- Mônica Salgado - Journalist
- Taciele Alcolea - YouTuber
- Ricky Hiraoka - Journalist
- Leila Schuster - Businesswoman, model, and Miss Brasil 1993 from Rio Grande do Sul
