= Emília Barreto =

Brazilian beauty queen (1934–2022)

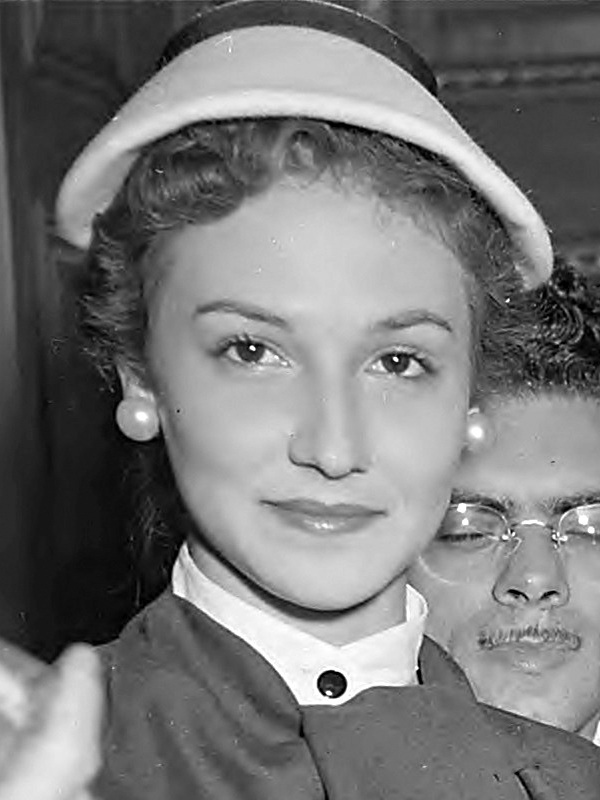
- Emília Barreto Corrêa Lima, Miss Brazil of 1955, Rio de Janeiro, RJ
- Born: Emília Barreto Corrêa Lima; 10 April 1934; Sobral, Brazil
- Died: 4 February 2022 (aged 87); Rio de Janeiro, Brazil

Emília Barreto Corrêa Lima (10 April 1934 – 4 February 2022) was a Brazilian model and beauty pageant titleholder. She was the second-ever Miss Brazil, a title which was awarded to her in 1955.

== Biography ==
Barreto was born in Sobral and grew up in Camocim. After her victory in the Miss Brazil competition, she received a letter from Rachel de Queiroz. She was subsequently one of the semifinalists for Miss Universe 1955. She was also the first-ever Miss Ceará and represented Sport Club Maguari. During her time as reigning Miss Brazil, she kept a low profile, only attending charitable events and refusing to charge for her presence.

She married engineer Wilson Santa Cruz Caldas in 1956, with whom she had four children: Nelson, Marília, Emília, and Anna Cecília. She was also the maternal grandmother of actor Eduardo Caldas.

Barreto died in Rio de Janeiro on 4 February 2022, at the age of 87.
