= Sobral, Ceará =

Municipality in Ceará, Brazil

Sobral
- Municipality
- Municipality of Sobral
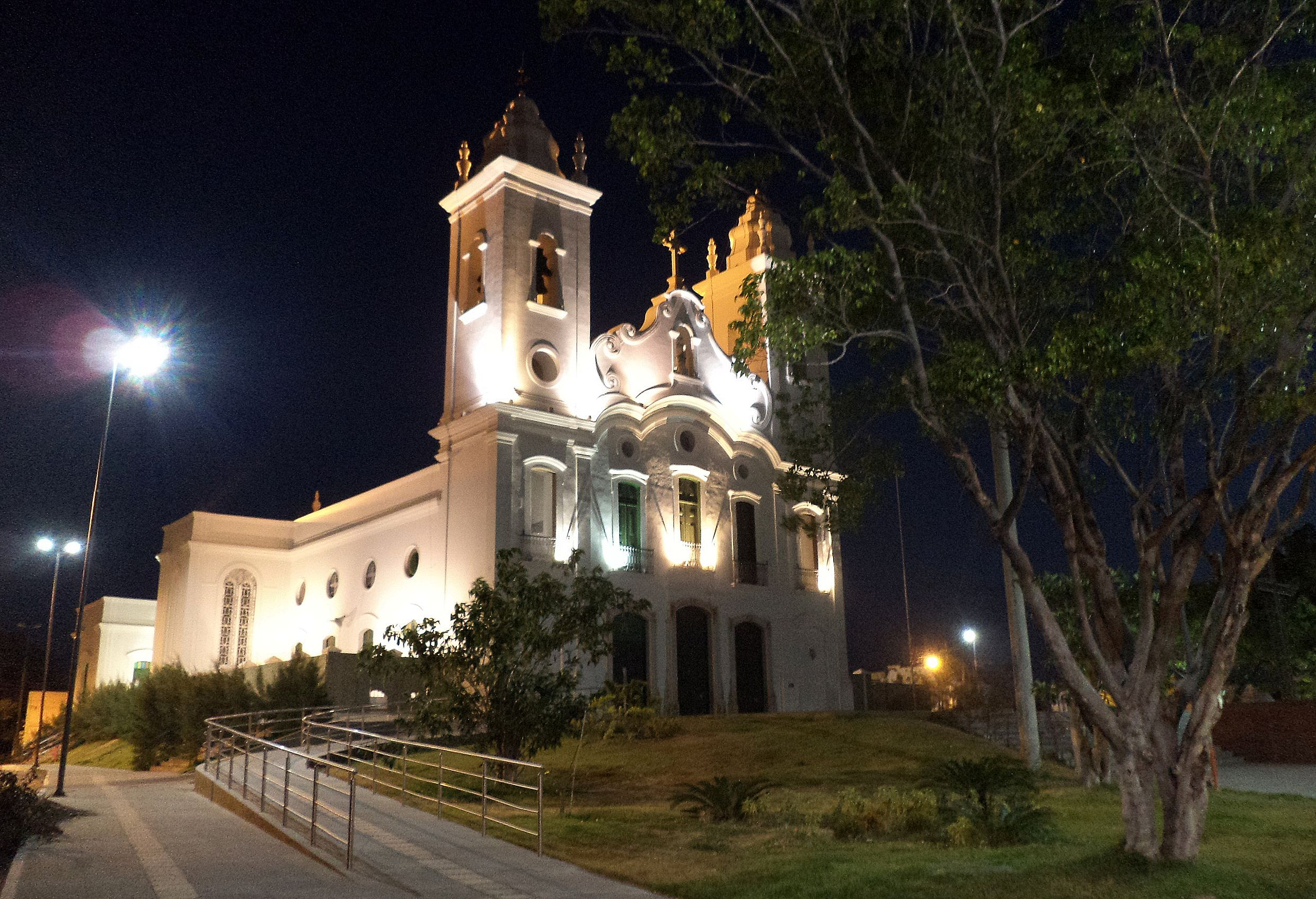
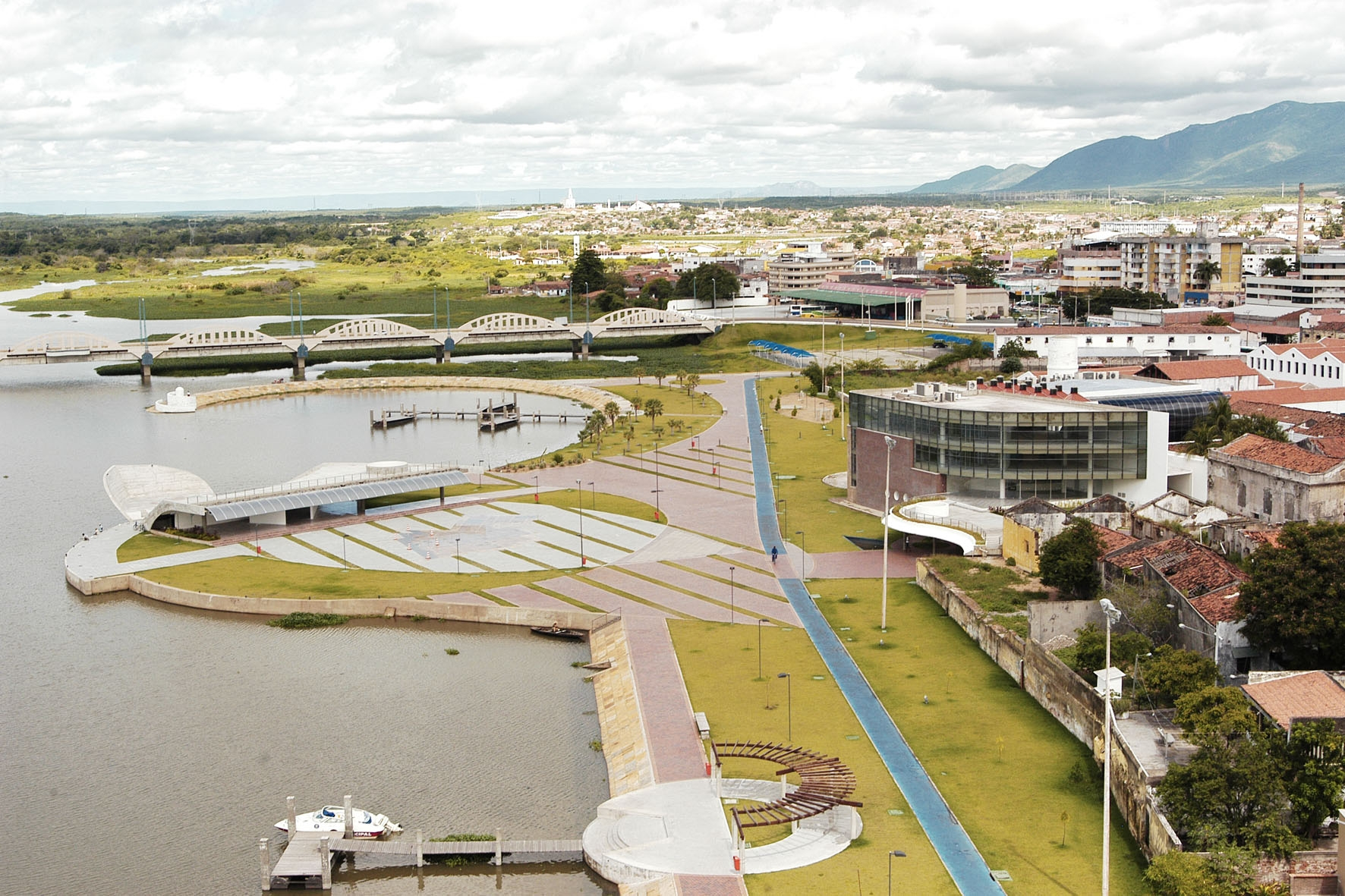
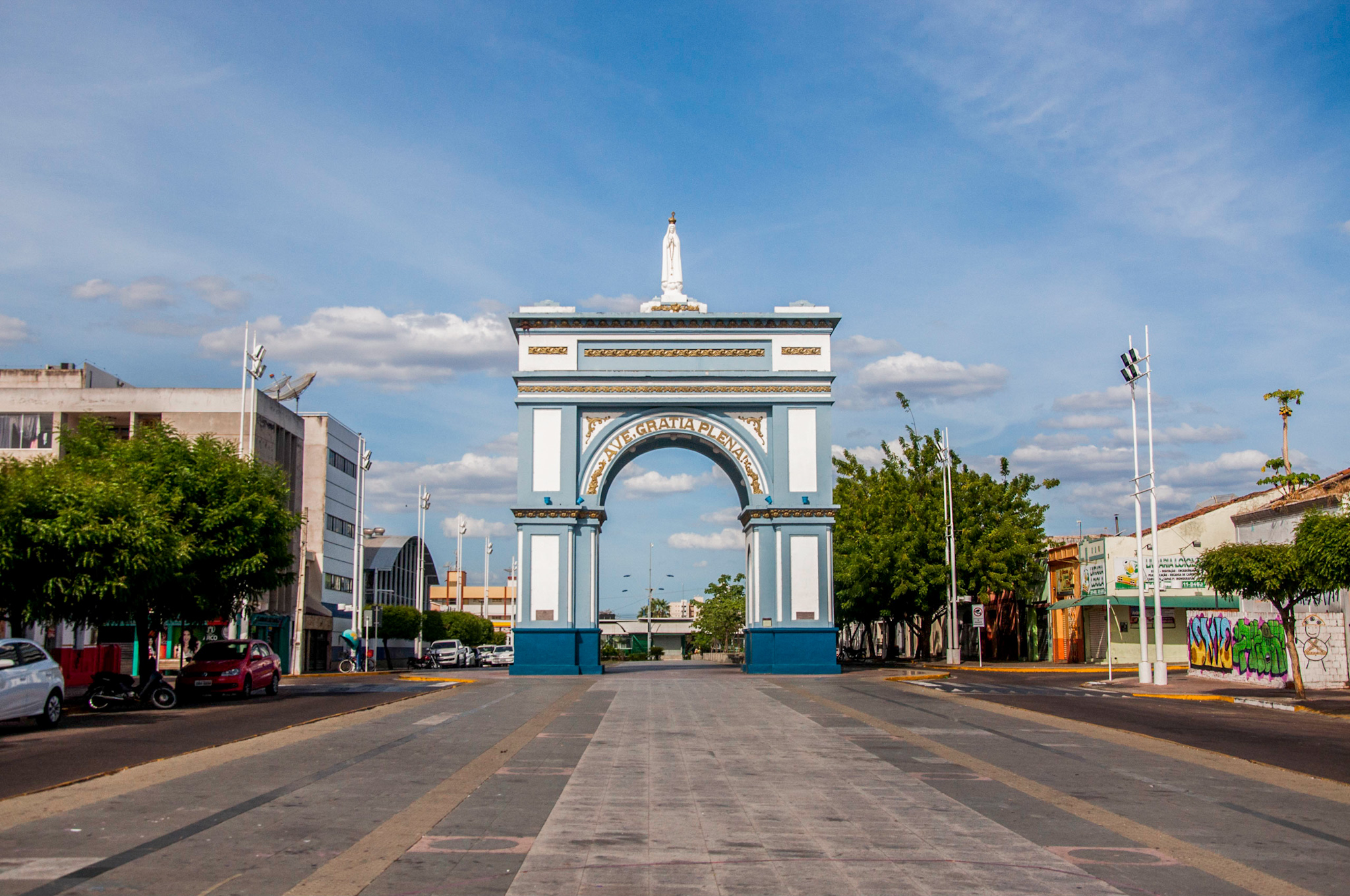
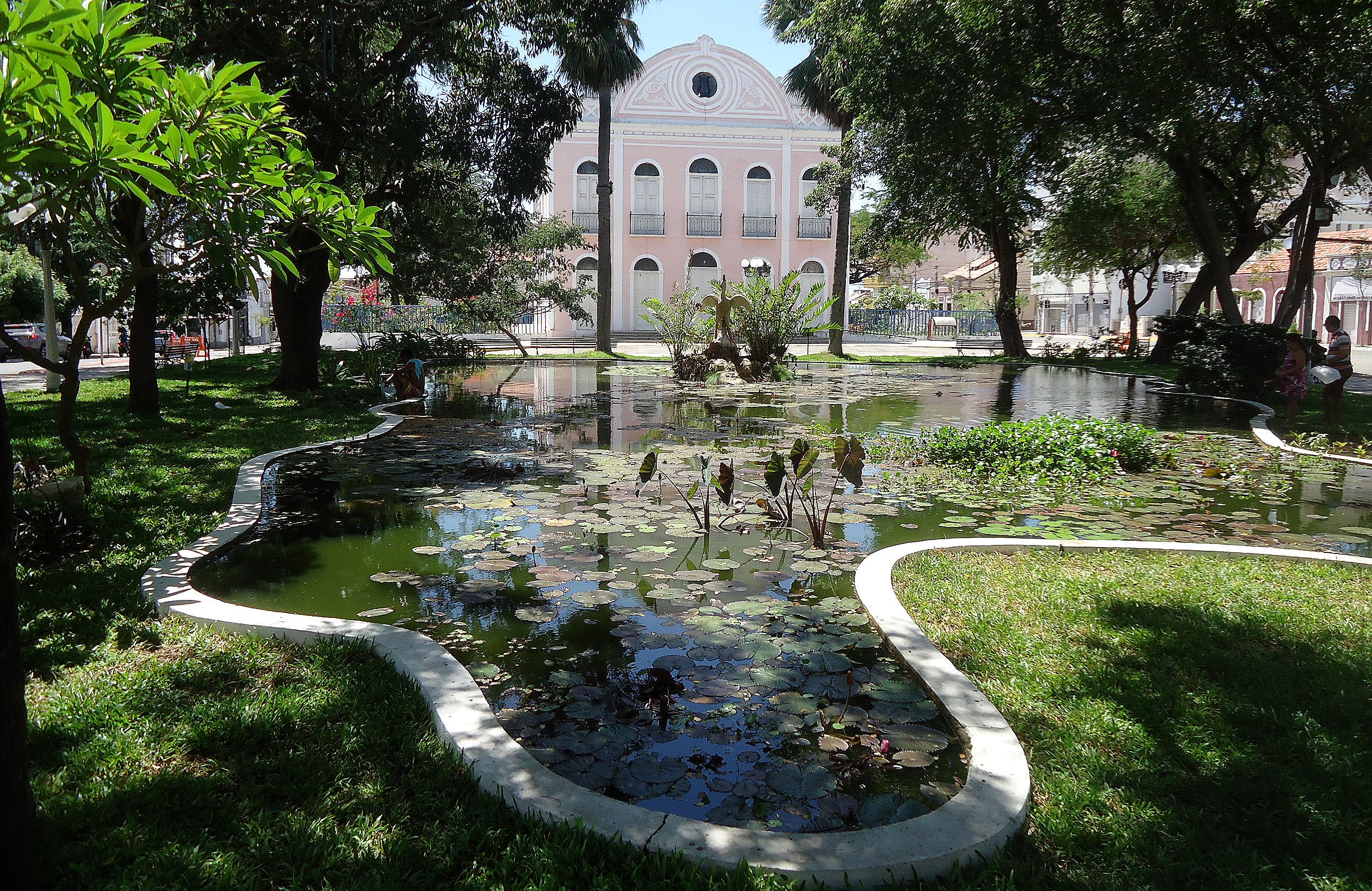
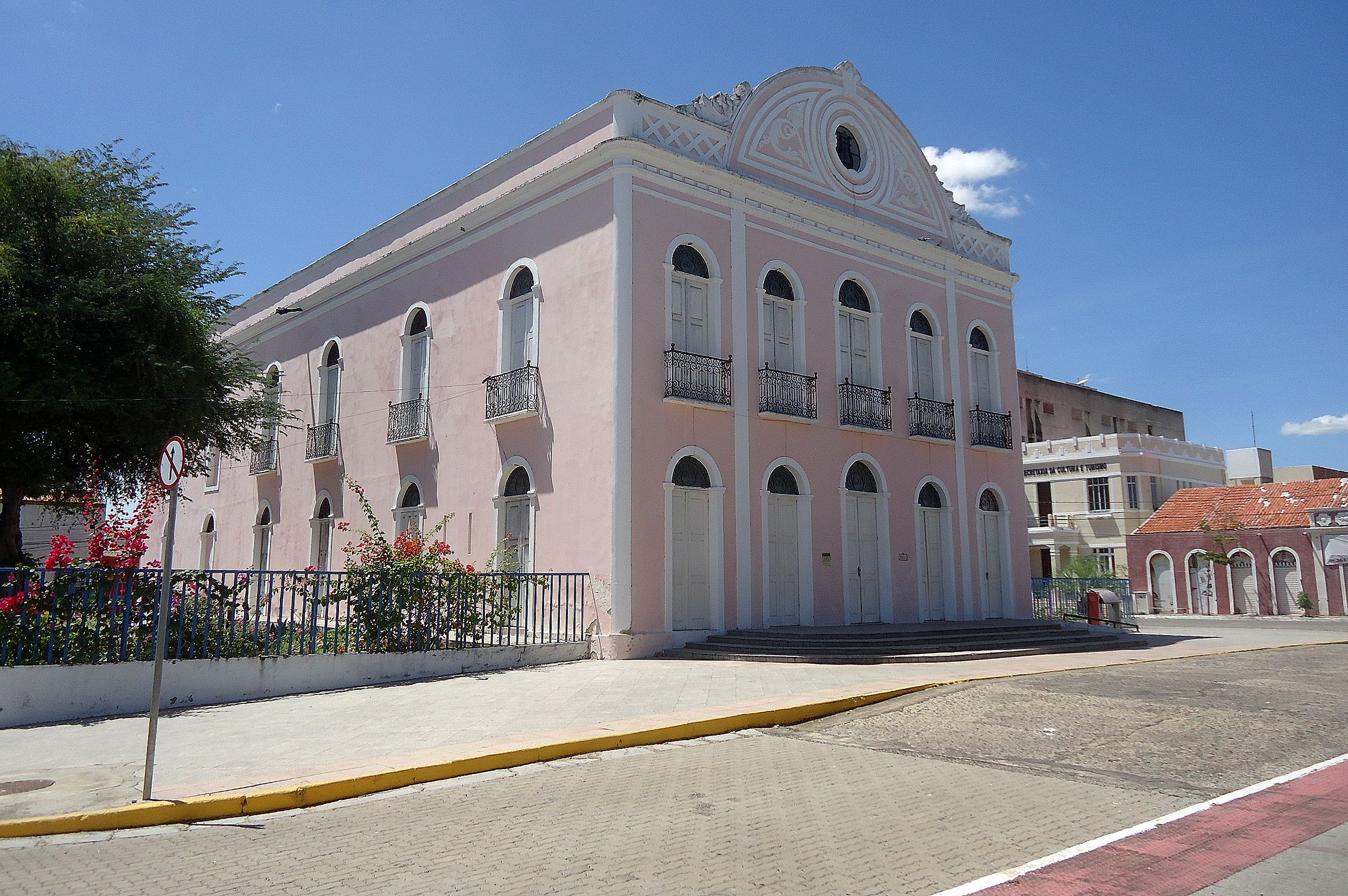
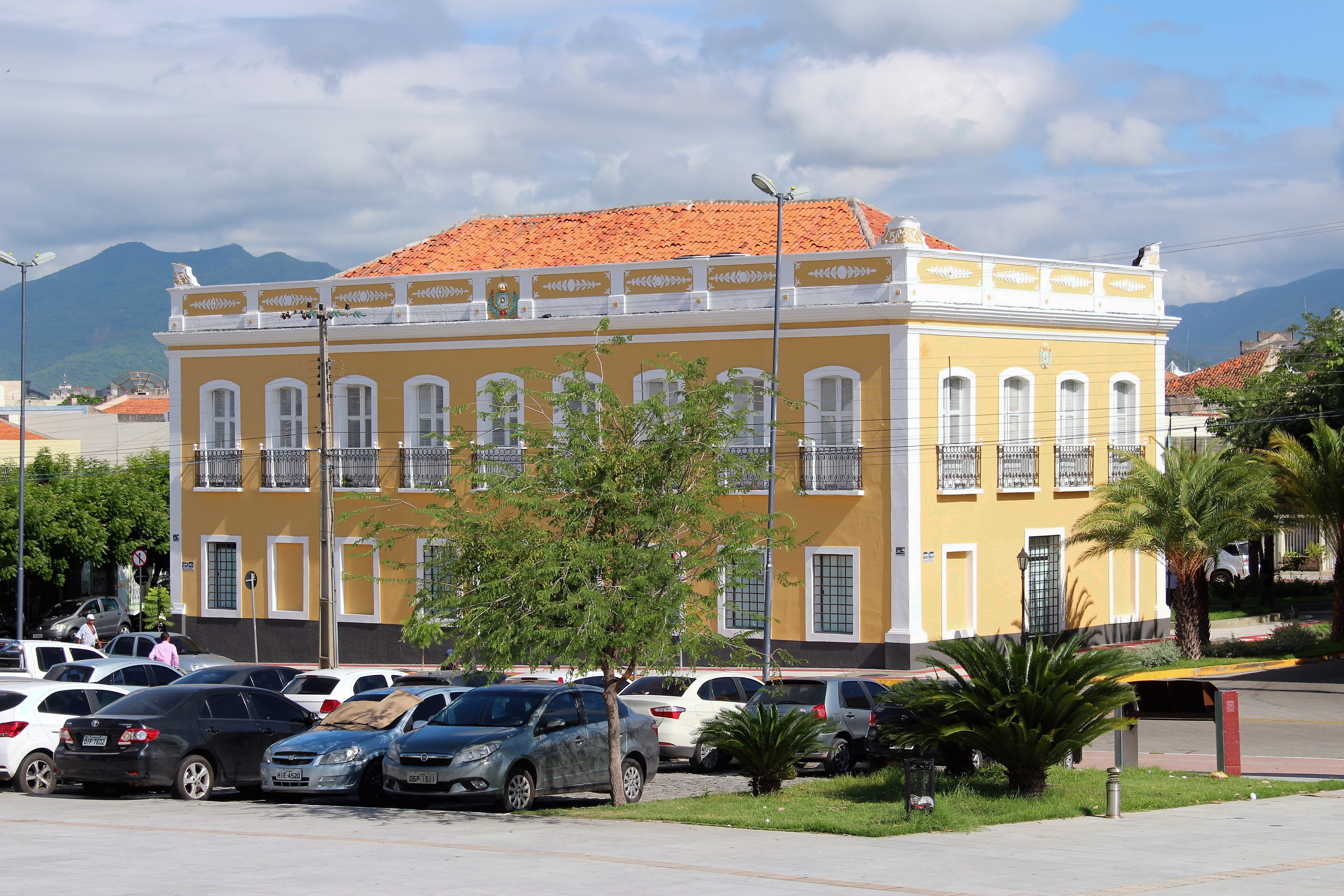
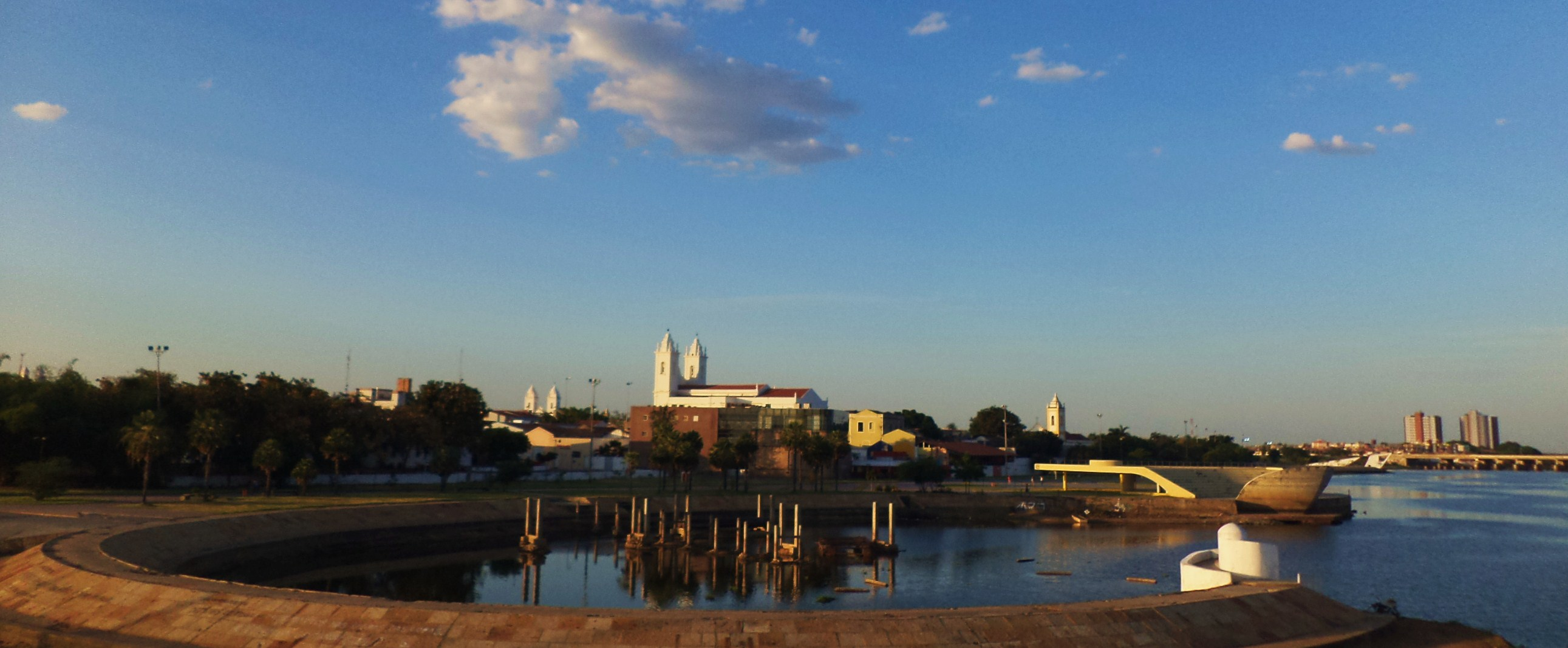

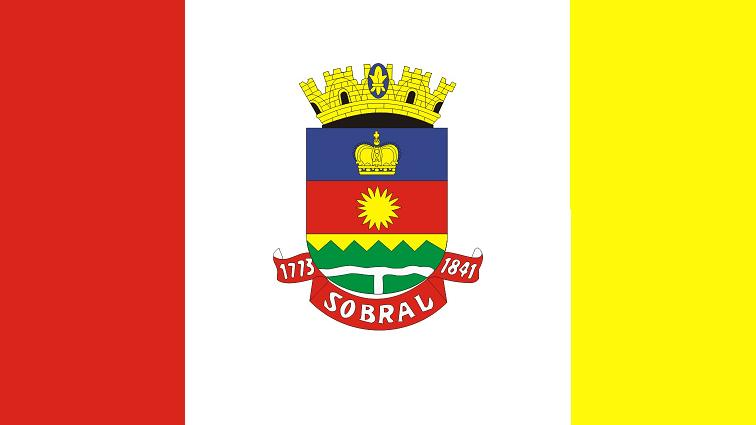
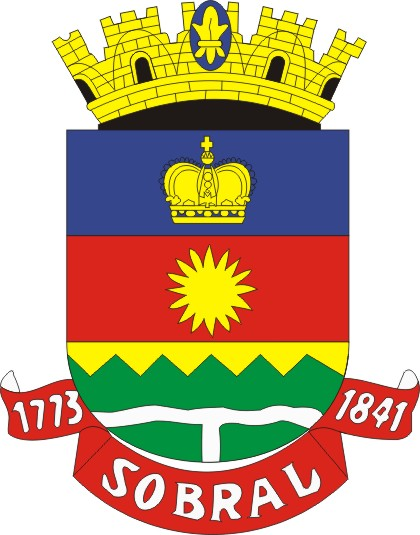
- Flag Coat of arms
- Nickname: "Princesa do Norte" (North's Princess)
- Motto: Sobral cada vez melhor
- Location in Ceará
- Coordinates: 03°40′26″S 40°14′20″W
- Country: Brazil
- Region: Northeast
- State: Ceará
- Settled: July 5, 1773

Government
  - Mayor: Oscar Rodrigues (UNIÃO)

Area
  - Total: 2,122.898 km^{2} (819.656 sq mi)
- Elevation: 70 m (230 ft)

Population (2022 Brazilian Census)
  - Total: 203,023
  - Estimate (2025): 216,519
  - Density: 95.6348/km^{2} (247.693/sq mi)
- Time zone: UTC−3 (BRT)
- HDI (2010): 0.714 – high
- Website: sobral.ce.gov.br

National Historic Heritage of Brazil
- Designated: 1379
- Reference no.: 944

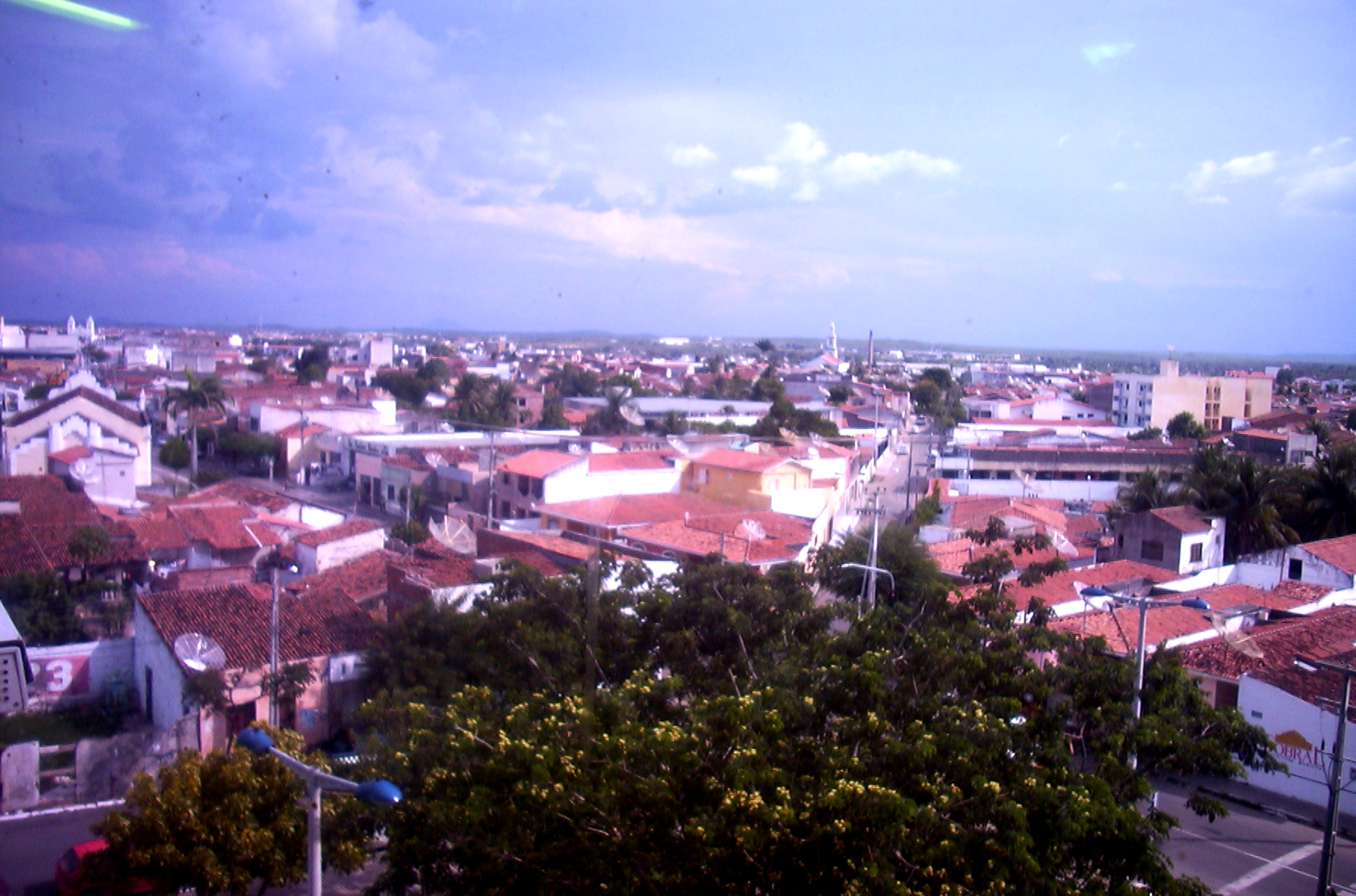
A general view of the city's downtown area as photographed from the seat of the city government

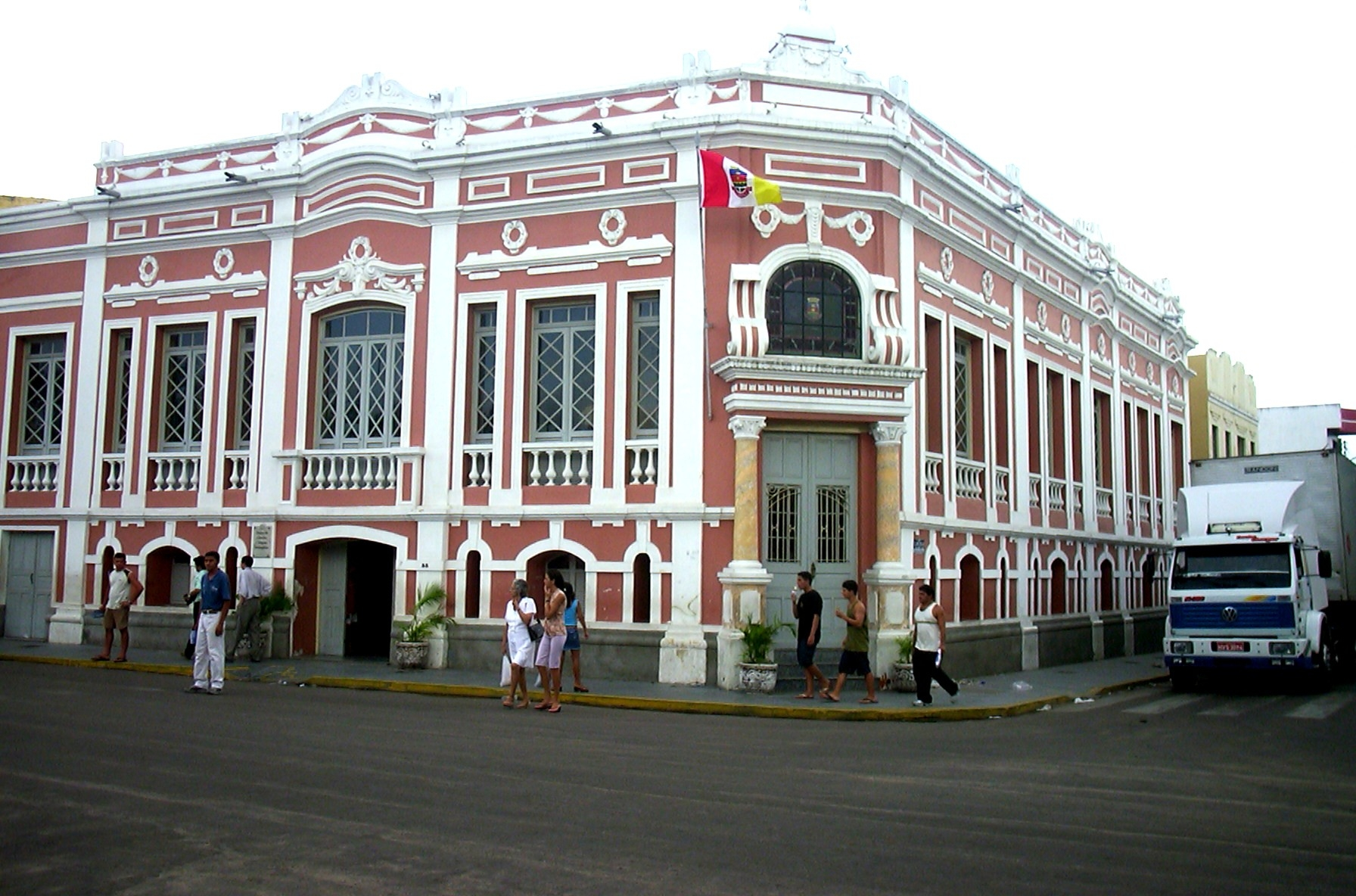
A historical building in downtown Sobral

Sobral is a municipality in the state of Ceará, Brazil.

Sobral is the fifth largest municipality of Ceará, after Fortaleza. Its economy is based on agriculture, services and some manufacturing industries. The city has two public universities: Universidade Federal do Ceará and Universidade Estadual do Vale do Acaraú. It also has private universities, such as Faculdade Luciano Feijão, Unopar, and UNINTA − a theological institute. The city is the seat of the Roman Catholic Diocese of Sobral.

The city is known for being the place where the astronomical observation of a solar eclipse on May 29, 1919, by a team of British scientists led by Sir Frank Watson Dyson was offered as the first proof of Albert Einstein's theory of general relativity, which had been published in 1916. The town's Museu do Eclipse ("Museum of the Eclipse") celebrates this event. There is a monument in Patrocínio Square marking the location of this solar eclipse. A planetarium was also inaugurated in 2015 next to this monument.

== Government ==
- Ivo Gomes (PDT)

== Geography ==
=== Climate ===
The climate of Sobral is hot almost all year. The temperature in the municipality varies from 22 to 36 °C (72 to 97 °F).

Climate data for Sobral (1991–2020)
| Month | Jan | Feb | Mar | Apr | May | Jun | Jul | Aug | Sep | Oct | Nov | Dec | Year |
|---|---|---|---|---|---|---|---|---|---|---|---|---|---|
| Mean daily maximum °C (°F) | 34.2 (93.6) | 32.7 (90.9) | 32.1 (89.8) | 31.4 (88.5) | 32.2 (90.0) | 33.1 (91.6) | 34.2 (93.6) | 35.8 (96.4) | 36.7 (98.1) | 36.9 (98.4) | 36.7 (98.1) | 36.2 (97.2) | 34.4 (93.9) |
| Daily mean °C (°F) | 27.5 (81.5) | 26.7 (80.1) | 26.3 (79.3) | 26.0 (78.8) | 26.2 (79.2) | 26.3 (79.3) | 26.8 (80.2) | 27.5 (81.5) | 28.1 (82.6) | 28.3 (82.9) | 28.4 (83.1) | 28.5 (83.3) | 27.2 (81.0) |
| Mean daily minimum °C (°F) | 22.9 (73.2) | 22.7 (72.9) | 22.6 (72.7) | 22.6 (72.7) | 22.1 (71.8) | 21.1 (70.0) | 20.9 (69.6) | 21.1 (70.0) | 21.9 (71.4) | 22.4 (72.3) | 22.5 (72.5) | 22.9 (73.2) | 22.1 (71.8) |
| Average precipitation mm (inches) | 123.7 (4.87) | 161.8 (6.37) | 220.1 (8.67) | 206.3 (8.12) | 93.2 (3.67) | 30.1 (1.19) | 17.4 (0.69) | 3.9 (0.15) | 0.4 (0.02) | 2.0 (0.08) | 5.5 (0.22) | 23.2 (0.91) | 887.6 (34.94) |
| Average precipitation days (≥ 1.0 mm) | 9 | 12 | 17 | 15 | 9 | 4 | 2 | 1 | 0 | 0 | 0 | 2 | 71 |
| Average relative humidity (%) | 70.5 | 78.9 | 83.0 | 84.8 | 80.2 | 72.0 | 67.7 | 58.5 | 57.8 | 56.3 | 57.3 | 64.5 | 69.3 |
| Mean monthly sunshine hours | 194.2 | 174.2 | 184.1 | 181.7 | 219.3 | 226.1 | 250.6 | 289.4 | 284.1 | 290.0 | 259.4 | 246.0 | 2,799.1 |
Source: Instituto Nacional de Meteorologia

== Education ==
=== Universities ===
- Universidade Vale do Acaraú (Acaraú Valley University)
- Universidade Federal do Ceará (Federal University of Ceará)

There are 105 schools in the city.

=== Public schools ===
- Escola Municipal de Ensino Fundamental Sinhá Saboia
- Escola Estadual Dom José Tupinambá da Frota
- Escola Municipal Emílio Sendim
- Escola Municipal Maria do Carmo de Andrade
- Escola Municipal Mocinha Rodrigues
- Escola Padre Osvaldo Chaves
- Escola Prof Gerardo Rodrigues de Albuquerque
- Colégio Sobralense de Tempo Integral Maria Dias Ibiapína

=== Private schools ===
- Escola Sant'Ana
- Escola Luciano Feijão
- Escola Farias Brito Sobralense
- Escola José Romão
- Escola do Patrocinio
- Escola São Francisco de Assis
- Colégio Maria Imaculada

== Media ==
=== Radio ===
The city has thirteen radio stations.

- Jovem Pan FM
- Rede Jangadeiro
- Rede Som Zoom Sat
- Rede Plus FM
- Coqueiros FM
- Paraíso FM
- Public Radio
- Sobral Public Radio
- Caiçara AM
- Tupinambá AM
- Regional
- Ressureição
- Educadora do Nordeste de Sobral

=== Television ===
The city has one television station, NordesTV.

== Tourist attractions ==
- Museu do Eclipse (Museum)
- Museu Dom José (Museum)
- Museu MADI (Museum)
- Teatro São José (Theatre)
- Teatro São João (Theatre)
- Biblioteca Pública Municipal (Library)

== Access ==
Four roads give access to the city: BR-222, CE-440, CE-441 and BR-220.

The city is served by Cel. Virgílio Távora Airport.

== Notable people ==
- Antônio Renato Aragão, comic actor, film producer, and writer
- Belchior, singer
- Florent Amodio, figure skater
- Fernando Sobral, football player
- Daniel Sobralense, football player
- Emília Barreto, model and Miss Brazil 1955
- Zacarias Gondim, one of those responsible for creating the Anthem of Ceará.
- Caio Magalhães, MMA fighter
- Carlos Hamilton Vasconcelos Araújo, economist
- Luís Silvestre Gomes Coelho, colonel in the Brazilian Army and governor of the Territory of Acre
