= Miss Grand Rio de Janeiro =

State-level pageant in Brazil

- Formation: September 12, 2021; 5 years ago
- Founder: Noemi Rosseto
- Type: Beauty pageant
- Headquarters: Rio de Janeiro
- Location: Brazil
- Members: Miss Grand Brazil
- Official language: Portuguese
- Director: Noemi Rosseto (2022–2023); Fabrício Granito (2024)
- Website: helecossistema.com.br

Miss Grand Rio de Janeiro is a Brazilian state-level female beauty pageant, founded by Noemi Rosseto in 2021, to select the representatives of Rio de Janeiro for the Miss Grand Brazil pageant. The competition license was transferred to Fabrício Granito, who has owned and run the pageant since 2024.

Since the establishment of Miss Grand Brazil, Rio de Janeiro representatives have not won the title yet. The highest achievement they obtained was the first runner-up, won in 2014 by an appointed Camila Coutinho.

== History ==
The state of Rio de Janeiro has participated in the Miss Grand Brazil pageant since the first edition which was held in 2014. However, its first three representatives were appointed. The first Miss Grand Rio de Janeiro was held in September 2021 after the state franchise was granted to a local organizer led by Noemi Rosseto. The contest, held virtually due to the COVID-19 pandemic, consisted of 20 finalists, of whom a model Keila Campbell was elected the winner. Campbell later participated in the national pageant held the following year but was unplaced.

Later in 2024, after Miss Brazil CNB lost the national license to another organizer, Evandro Hazzy, led by Hazzy Top Talent, the license of Miss Grand Rio de Janeiro was then transferred to Fabrício Granito of Hel Ecossistema.

== Editions ==
The following table details Miss Grand Rio de Janeiro's annual editions since 2021.

Edition	Date	Final venue	Entrants	Winner	Ref.
1st	September 12, 2021	Online pageant	20	Keila Campbell	
2nd	May 7, 2023	Baden Powel Theater Copacabana Room, Rio de Janeiro	12	Esthefane Souza	
3rd	July 30, 2024	Vivo Rio, Flamengo Park, Rio de Janeiro	27	Andrieli Rozin	

== National competition ==
The following is a list of representatives of the state of Rio de Janeiro in the Miss Grand Brazil national pageant.

Year	Representative	Original state title (Note: Title directly obtained from any state-level pageants, not the appointed title.)	Placement at Miss Grand Brazil	State director	Ref.
2014	Camila Coutinho	Appointed	1st runner-up	Appointed to the state title by national organizer	
2019	Isabelle Pandini	Appointed	3rd runner-up	Appointed to the state title by national organizer	
2020	Jessica Nunes	Appointed	Top 15	Appointed to the state title by national organizer	
No national pageant in 2021 due to the COVID-19 pandemic
2022	Keila Campbell	Miss Grand Rio de Janeiro 2021	Unplaced	Noemi Rosseto	
2023	Esthefane Souza	Miss Grand Rio de Janeiro 2023	Top 11	Noemi Rosseto	
2024	Andrieli Rozin	Miss Grand Rio de Janeiro 2024	Top 10	Fabrício Granito	
2025	Eduarda Dallagnol	Appointed	Resigned	Adriano André	
