= Miss Grand Minas Gerais =

State-level pageant in Brazil

- Formation: November 13, 2021; 4 years ago
- Founder: Braz Alves
- Type: Beauty pageant
- Headquarters: Belo Horizonte
- Location: Brazil
- Members: Miss Grand Brazil
- Official language: Portuguese
- Director: Adriana Macedo

Miss Grand Minas Gerais is a Brazilian state-level female beauty pageant, founded in 2021 by a Patos de Minas-based organizer, Braz Alves, to select the representatives of Minas Gerais for the Miss Grand Brazil pageant. The competition license was transferred to Adriana Macedo, who has owned and run the pageant since 2024.

Since the establishment of Miss Grand Brazil, Minas Gerais representatives have not won the title yet. The highest achievement they obtained was the first runner-up, won in 2019 by an appointed Lorena Rodrigues, who was later appointed Miss Grand Brazil 2021 and received the second runner-up in the international competition held in Thailand.

== History ==
The state of Minas Gerais has participated in the Miss Grand Brazil pageant since the first edition which was held in 2014. However, its first three representatives were appointed. The first Miss Grand Minas Gerais was held in November 2021 after the state franchise was granted to a local organizer led by Braz Alves. The contest, held on November 13 at the HZ Hotel in Patos de Minas, consisted of 20 finalists, of whom a model Malu Camargos was elected the winner. Camargos later participated in the national pageant held the following year and qualified for the top 12 round.

Later in 2024, Braz Alves planned to organize the 2024 state competition in Patos de Minas, on 17 January, but lost the license to another local organizer, Adriana Macedo, due to the change of national franchise holder.

In addition to the state-level contest, another regional event, Miss Grand Zona da Mata Mineira, was held in 2023 in the city of Barbacena. The event consisted of 12 candidates, of whom Adriana Yanca was named the winner. Yanca later participated in the Miss Grand Brazil 2023 pageant and won the title.

== Editions ==
The following table details Miss Grand Minas Gerais's annual editions since 2021.

Edition	Date	Final venue	Entrants	Winner	Ref.
1st (Note: Held in parallel with the Miss Supranational Minas Gerais and Miss Minas Gerais CBN Teen pageants.)	November 13, 2021	HZ Hotel, Patos de Minas, Minas Gerais	11	Malu Camargos	
2nd	November 15, 2022	HZ Hotel, Patos de Minas, Minas Gerais	8	Júlia de Castro Rodrigues	
3rd	July 15, 2024	Hotel Ouro Minas, Belo Horizonte	20	Bruna Rezende	

== National competition ==
The following is a list of representatives of the state of Minas Gerais in the Miss Grand Brazil national pageant.

Year	Representative	Original state title	Placement at Miss Grand Brazil	Ref.
2014	Cynthia Gomes	Appointed	3rd runner-up	
2019	Lorraine Rodrigues	Appointed	2nd runner-up	
2020	Luísa Rocha	Appointed	Top 12	
No national pageant in 2021 due to the COVID-19 pandemic
2022	Malu Camargos	Miss Grand Minas Gerais 2022	Top 16	
2023	Júlia de Castro Rodrigues	Miss Grand Minas Gerais 2023	4th runner-up	
2024	Bruna Rezende	Miss Grand Minas Gerais 2024	Top 10	
2025	Anne Alice Rhein	Appointed	Top 15	
