= Miss Grand Paraná =

State-level pageant in Brazil

- Formation: June 26, 2021; 5 years ago
- Founder: Edy Godoy
- Type: Beauty pageant
- Headquarters: Paraná
- Location: Brazil
- Members: Miss Grand Brazil
- Official language: Portuguese
- Director: Edy Godoy (2021–2023); Marta Cathiusse (2024–Present)

Miss Grand Paraná is a Brazilian state-level female beauty pageant, founded in 2021 by a São Paulo-based organizer, Edy Godoy, to select the representatives of Paraná for the Miss Grand Brazil pageant. The competition license was transferred to Marta Cathiusse, who has owned and run the pageant since 2024.

Since the establishment of Miss Grand Brazil, Paraná representatives won the contest once in 2014 by an appointed Yameme Ibrahim.

== History ==
The state of Paraná has participated in the Miss Grand Brazil pageant since the first edition which was held in 2014. However, its first three representatives were appointed. The first Miss Grand Paraná was held in November 2021 after the state franchise was granted to a local organizer led by Edy Godoy. The contest, held on June 26 at the HZ Hotel in Patos de Minas, consisted of 18 finalists, of whom a model Gabriela Borges was elected the winner. Borges later participated in the national pageant held the following year and was named the first runner-up.

Later in late 2023, Edy Godoy organized the state pageant to select a representative for the 2024 national contest; however, the 2024 state winner, Aline Biolchi, had to withdraw from the national event due to the change of national franchise holder, and the state license for Miss Grand Paraná 2024 was granted to another organizer.

== Editions ==
The following table details Miss Grand Paraná's annual editions since 2021.

Edition	Date	Final venue	Entrants	Winner	Ref.
1st	June 26, 2021	Recanto Cataratas Thermas Resort & Convention, Foz do Iguaçu	18	Gabriela Borges	
2nd (Note: The first runner-up of the contest, Bárbara David Vázquez, was later appointed to compete as the representative of Cataratas do Iguaçu.)	September 6, 2022	Recanto Cataratas Thermas Resort & Convention, Foz do Iguaçu	20	Ana Finkler	
3rd	November 22, 2023	Recanto Cataratas Thermas Resort & Convention, Foz do Iguaçu	29	Aline Biolchi (Note: The competition was held under Miss Brazil CNB, who later lost the 2024 Miss Grand Brazil license to Hazzy Top Talent, and the state license of Miss Grand Paraná was granted to another organizer; thus, the winner of the contest, Aline Biolchi, was automatically disqualified for the Miss Grand Brazil 2024 pageant.)	
3rd	July 20, 2024	Teatro Calil Haddad, Maringá	24	Jessica Aguiar	

== National competition ==
The following is a list of representatives of the state of Paraná in the Miss Grand Brazil national pageant.

Year	Representative	Original state title	Placement at Miss Grand Brazil	Ref.
2014	Yameme Ibrahim	Appointed	Winner	
2019	Polyana Rosa	Appointed	Top 12	
2020	Clarissa Thomsen	Appointed	3rd runner-up	
No national pageant in 2021 due to the COVID-19 pandemic
2022	Gabriela Borges	Miss Grand Paraná 2021	1st runner-up	
2023	Ana Finkler	Miss Grand Paraná 2023	3rd runner-up	
2024	Jessica Aguiar	Miss Grand Paraná 2024	Top 16	
