= Miss Grand Pará =

State-level beauty pageant in Brazil

- Formation: March 30, 2023; 3 years ago
- Founder: Lucas Camisão
- Type: Beauty pageant
- Headquarters: Pará
- Location: Brazil
- Members: Miss Grand Brazil
- Official language: Portuguese
- Director: Lucas Camisão (2022–2023); Herculano Silva (2024–Present)

Miss Grand Pará is a Brazilian state-level female beauty pageant, founded in 2023 by an architect, Lucas Camisão, to select the representatives of Pará for the Miss Grand Brazil pageant. The competition license was transferred to Herculano Silva, who has owned and run the pageant since 2024.

Since the establishment of Miss Grand Brazil, Pará representatives have not won the contest yet. The highest placement they obtained was the top 11 finalist, won in 2023 by Yasmin Alcântara Resende.

== History ==
The state of Pará has participated in the Miss Grand Brazil pageant since the first edition which was held in 2014. However, its first three representatives were appointed. The first Miss Grand Pará was held in November 2021 after the state franchise was granted to a local organizer led by Lucas Camisão. The contest, held on March 30 at the Tetaro Maria Sylvia Nunes in Belém, consisted of 14 finalists, of whom a 19-year-old Veterinary medicine student representing Ulianópolis, Yasmin Alcântara Resende, was elected the winner. Yasmin later participated in the national pageant held in Foz do Iguaçu, Paraná, and was placed among the top 11 finalists.

Due to the change of national franchise holder in 2024, the state license for Miss Grand Pará 2024 was granted to another organizer led by Herculano Silva.

== Editions ==
The following table details Miss Grand Pará's annual editions since 2023.

Edition	Date	Final venue	Entrants	Winner	Ref.
1st (Note: Held in parallel with the Miss World Pará 2023 (Miss Pará CNB 2023), Miss Supranational Pará 2023, and Miss Earth Pará 2023 pageants.)	March 30, 2023	Teatro Maria Sylvia Nunes, Belém	14	Yasmin Resende	
2nd	July 18, 2024	Teatro Maria Sylvia Nunes, Belém	11	Karla Carneiro	

== National competition ==
The following is a list of representatives of the state of Pará in the Miss Grand Brazil national pageant.

Year	Representative	Original state title	Placement at Miss Grand Brazil	Ref.
2014	Dréssica Alves	Appointed	Withdrew	
2019	Thalita Maués	Appointed	Top 12	
2020	Vivian Henriques	Appointed	Unplaced	
No national pageant in 2021 due to the COVID-19 pandemic
2022	Shanti Devi	Appointed	Top 12	
2023	Yasmin Alcântara Resende	Miss Grand Pará 2023	Top 11	
2024	Karla Carneiro	Miss Grand Pará 2024	Unplaced	
