= Miss Grand Piauí =

State-level pageant in Brazil

- Formation: November 26, 2023; 2 years ago
- Founder: Everton Cesar
- Type: Beauty pageant
- Headquarters: Piauí
- Location: Brazil
- Members: Miss Grand Brazil
- Official language: Portuguese
- Director: Everton Cesar (2023); Eltton Carvalho (2024–Present)

Miss Grand Piauí is a Brazilian state-level female beauty pageant, founded in 2023 by an event organizer, Everton Cesar, to select the representatives of Piauí for the Miss Grand Brazil pageant. The competition license was transferred to Eltton Carvalho, who has owned and run the pageant since 2024.

Since establishing the Miss Grand Brazil pageant, Piauí representatives have yet to win or obtain any placement in the contest.

== History ==
The state of Piauí began participating in the Miss Grand Brazil pageant in 2022 with the representation of an appointed Ana Paula Souza. Later in 2023, the right to send Piauí candidate to Miss Grand Brazil was granted to the organizer of the Miss e Mister Model Piauí pageant, Everton Cesar, and the winner of that year's state event was automatically assumed Miss Grand Piauí 2023.

Everton Cesar later organized the first Miss Grand Piauí in late 2023 to select the state representative for the Miss Grand Brazil 2024 pageant. The contest, held on November 26 at the Blue Town Tower in Teresina, consisted of 13 finalists, of whom a model Lara Rodrigues was named the winner. However, due to the change of national franchise holder in 2024, and the state license for Miss Grand Piauí 2024 was granted to another organizer, Rodrigues was disqualified for the 2024 Miss Grand Brazil pageant and was sent to compete at another Miss Brazil CNB-organized pageant instead.

In 2023, some cities, such as Floriano, local pageants were also organized to select their representatives for Miss Grand Piauí.

== Editions ==
The following table details Miss Grand Piauí's annual editions since 2023.

Edition	Date	Final venue	Entrants	Winner	Ref.
1st	November 26, 2023	Blue Town Tower, Teresina	13	Lara Rodrigues (Note: The competition was held under Miss Brazil CNB, who later lost the 2024 Miss Grand Brazil license to Hazzy Top Talent, and the state license of Miss Grand Piauí was granted to another organizer; thus, the winner of the contest, Lara Rodrigues, was automatically disqualified for the Miss Grand Brazil 2024 pageant.)	

== National competition ==
The following is a list of representatives of the state of Piauí in the Miss Grand Brazil national pageant.

Year	Representative	Original state title	Placement at Miss Grand Brazil	Ref.
2022	Ana Paula Souza	Appointed	Unplaced	
2023	Maria Veloso	Miss Model Piauí 2022	Unplaced	
2024	Lara Rodrigues	Miss Grand Piauí 2024	Unable to competed due to the licensee change	
2024	Cecilia Almeida	Appointed	4th runner-up	
