= Miss Grand Brazil =

National female beauty contest in Brazil

- Formation: 25 July 2014; 12 years ago
- Founder: Gerson Antonelli
- Type: Beauty pageant
- Headquarters: São Paulo
- Location: Brazil
- Members: Miss Grand International
- Official language: Portuguese
- National Director: Rodrigo Ferro (2026 – Present)

Miss Grand Brazil licensees timeline
Stand-alone pageant; Appointed titleholder

Miss Grand Brazil is an annual female beauty pageant in Brazil, founded in 2014 by a São Paulo-based event organizer Gerson Antonelli, to select the country's representatives to compete in its parent international contest, Miss Grand International. From 2015 to 2023, the pageant was managed by Concurso Nacional de Beleza Miss Brasil (CNB Miss Brazil), led by Henrique Fontes. From 2024 to 2025, the franchise was transferred to former Miss Universe Brazil organizer, Evandro Hazzy of Hazzy Top Talent. Then, in 2026, Rodrigo Ferro assumed the leadership of the brazilian national pageant.

In its first two editions, 2014 and 2019, all national entrants were selected by the organization directly. However, after the license was distributed to the regional organizer in 2020, the pageant has regularly been featuring the contestants chosen by either the central organ or the licensed organizers. Since its inception, the contest was canceled once in 2021 due to the COVID-19 pandemic.

Brazil holds a record of 11 placements at Miss Grand International, the highest position was the first place won by Isabella Menin in 2022, followed by the first runner-up by the hands of Talita Hartmann in 2024, second runner-up, obtained by Lorena Rodrigues of Minas Gerais in 2021, and the fourth runner-up in 2019 and 2020, won by Marjorie Marcelle and Alaíse Guedes, respectively.

The reigning Miss Grand Brazil is Paula Assunção from Paraná, who was appointed on 25 July 2026.

== Background ==
=== History ===
Since the establishment of Miss Grand International in 2013, Brazil has always send the representatives to participate in such. Its first representative, Tamara de Costa Bicca Top 16 finalists Miss Brazil World 2013, was appointed by the licensee Concurso Nacional de Beleza Miss Brasil to join the international contest in Thailand where she was placed among the Top 10 finalist. In the following year, the inaugural contest of the Miss Grand Brazil was held after a São Paulo-based event organizer Gerson Antonelli had purchased the license. The contest was held as the sub-event of the annual festival Festival Nacional do Folclore at the Anfiteatro da Casa de Cultura of Olímpia city in São Paulo on 25 July, featuring 13 contestants, in which Yameme Ibrahim of Paraná won the main title. Ibrahim then participated at Miss Grand International 2014 in Thailand on 25 October and was placed among the Top 20 finalists. However, the license had been brought back to the hand of the CNB Miss Brazil in the following year then the country representatives at Miss Grand International were appointed to the position instead of organizing the Miss Grand national for four years consecutively; the elected queens includes Paula Gomes (2015), Renata Sena (2016), Caroline Venturini (2017), and Gabrielle Vilela (2018). Besides Miss Grand Brazil, CNB Miss Brazil also holds the country licenses for Miss World, Mister World as well as Miss and Mister Supranational.

The pageant was planned to be resurrected in 2017 at Hotel do Bosque Eco Resort in Angra dos Reis (RJ) on 5 May but the program, unfortunately, was rescheduled to 2019 for undisclosed reasons. Two years later, the suspended program was finally held on 28 February at Dall'Onder Grande Hotel in Bento Gonçalves of Rio Grande do Sul state, with 22 candidates representing each federative unit of Brazil participating, and the event has been held annually since then.

After its first postponement in 2017, the pageant, originally planned to be held on 12 October, has been canceled once again in 2021, resulting from the widespread COVID-19 infection in Brazil, which exceeds more than twenty thousand new positive cases per day in the second half of the year. Therefore, the director decided to assign the second runner-up of the 2019 contest – Lorena Rodrigues – to participate in the international edition, in which she finished as the second runner-up.

=== Selection of contestants ===
The Miss Grand Brazil pageant has been licensing the participant rights to the local agency since 2019. The regional licensees then select their representatives through either the local contest, internal casting, or by a hand-picking. In the 2022 edition, at least 13 federative units of Brazil (i.e., Goiás, Mato Grosso do Sul, Minas Gerais) held the state pageant or casting event to determine the finalists for Miss Grand Brazil 2022. Moreover, the national organizer also receives the application directly to choose the supplementary national finalists.

Several states have organized their state-level pageant to select representatives for Miss Grand Brazil, as detailed below.

- Miss Grand Minas Gerais (est. 2021)
- Miss Grand Pará (est. 2023)
- Miss Grand Paraná (est. 2021)
- Miss Grand Rio de Janeiro (est. 2021)
- Miss Grand Piauí (est. 2023)

== Editions ==
=== Location and date ===
Edition	Date	Final venue	Entrants	Ref.
1st	25 July 2014	Anfiteatro da Casa de Cultura, Olímpia, São Paulo	14	
2nd	28 February 2019	Dall'Onder Grande Hotel, Bento Gonçalves, Rio Grande do Sul	22	
3rd	30 January 2020	Dall'Onder Grande Hotel, Bento Gonçalves, Rio Grande do Sul	24	
4th	28 July 2022	Theater Caesb, Federal District, Brasília	31	
5th	10 June 2023	Recanto Cataratas Thermas Resort, Foz do Iguaçu, Paraná	28	
6th	8 August 2024	Tokio Marine Hall, Várzea de Baixo, São Paulo	27	
7th	6 July 2025	Centro de Convenções Espaço Immensità, São Paulo	27	

=== Competition result ===
Edition	Winner	Runners-up				Ref.
Edition	Winner	First	Second	Third	Fourth	Ref.
1st	Yameme Ibrahim (Paraná)	Camila Coutinho (Rio de Janeiro)	Naiara Thomé (São Paulo)	Cynthia Gomes (Minas Gerais)	Not awarded	
2nd	Marjorie Marcelle (São Paulo)	Amanda Brenner (Maranhão)	Lorena Rodrigues (Minas Gerais)	Isabelle Pandini (Rio de Janeiro)	Amanda Cardoso (Espírito Santo)	
3rd	Lala Guedes (Paraíba)	Mylena Duarte (Espírito Santo)	Caroline Andrade (Sergipe)	Clarissa Thomsen (Paraná)	Ruthy Rafaella (Alagoas)	
4th	Isabella Menin (Alto Cafezal)	Ana Gabriela Borges (Paraná)	Vitória Brodt (Rio Grande do Sul)	Bárbara Reis (Norte Mato-Grossense)	Maythe Varzoni (Mato Grosso)	
5th	Adriana Yanca (Zona da Mata Mineira)	Cinthya Moura (Pernambuco)	Luciana Gomes (Tocantins)	Ana Finkler (Paraná)	Júlia de Castro Rodrigues (Minas Gerais)	
6th	Talita Hartmann (Rio Grande do Sul)	Loraine Lumatelli (Mato Grosso do Sul)	Laila Vieira (Alagoas)	Laila Frizon (Tocantins)	Cecilia Almeida (Piauí)	
7th	Kaliana Diniz (Paraíba)	Monã Vianna (Pará)	Ana Beatriz Nazareno (Rio de Janeiro)	Ananda Santos (Bahia)	Thaís de Souza Bonatti (Santa Catarina)	

== Winner gallery ==
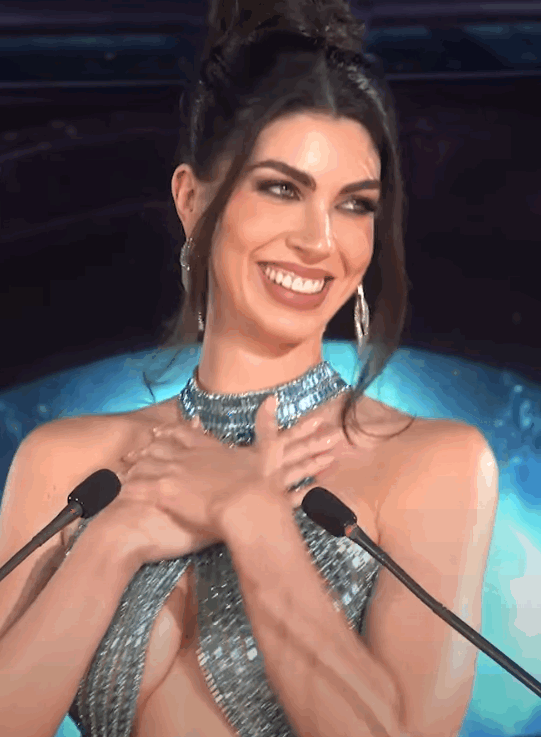
Miss Grand Brazil 2025
Kaliana Diniz
Paraíba

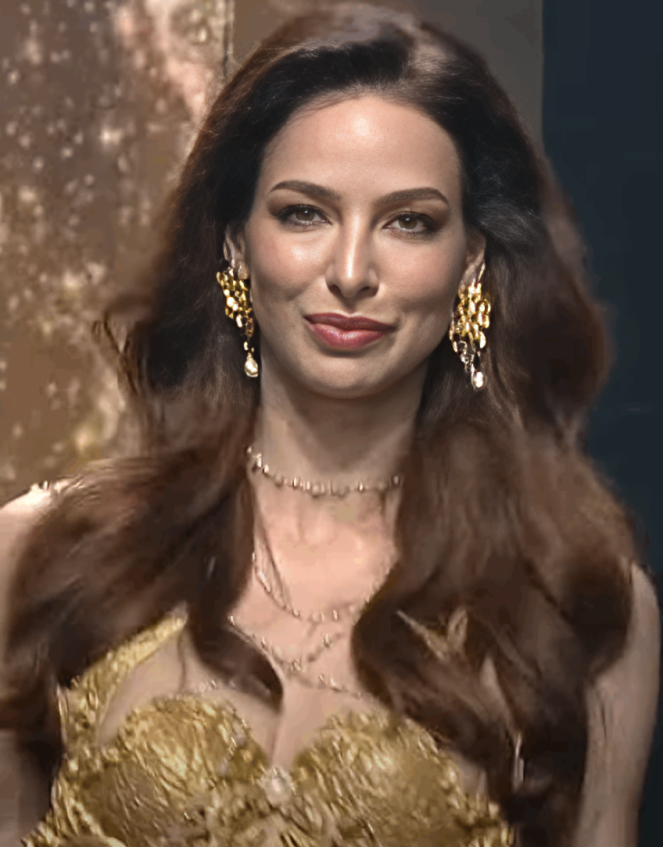
Miss Grand Brazil 2024
Talita Hartmann
Rio Grande do Sul

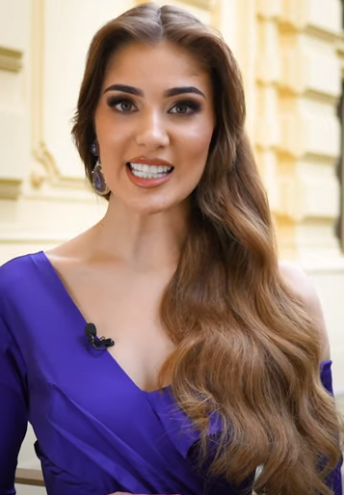
Miss Grand Brazil 2023
Adriana Yanca
Minas Gerais

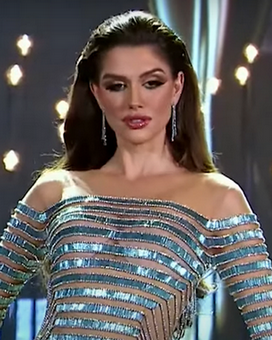
Miss Grand Brazil 2022
Isabella Menin
São Paulo

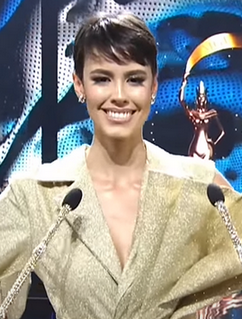
Miss Grand Brazil 2021
Lorena Rodrigues
Minas Gerais

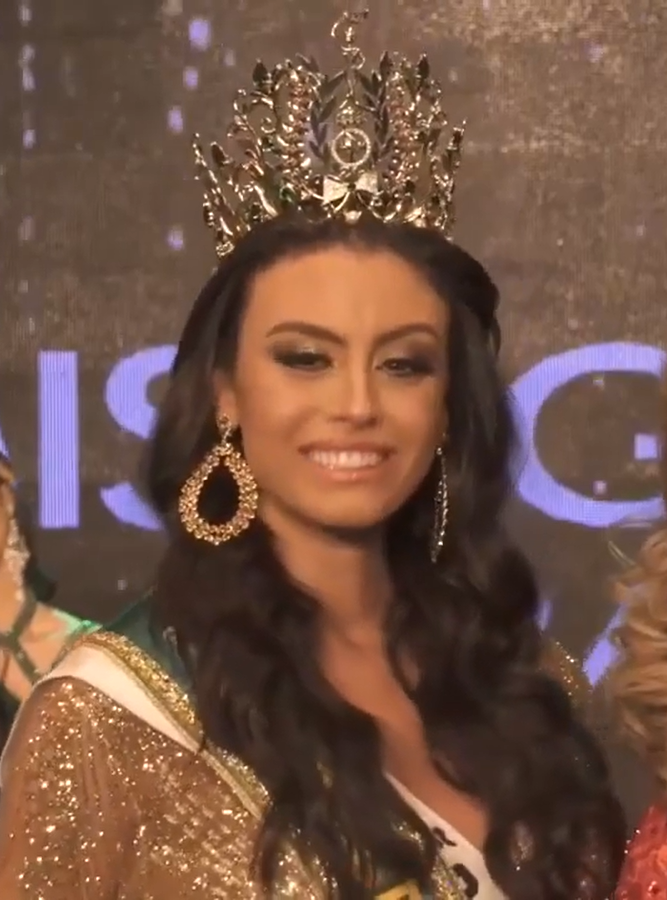
Miss Grand Brazil 2019
Marjorie Marcelle
São Paulo

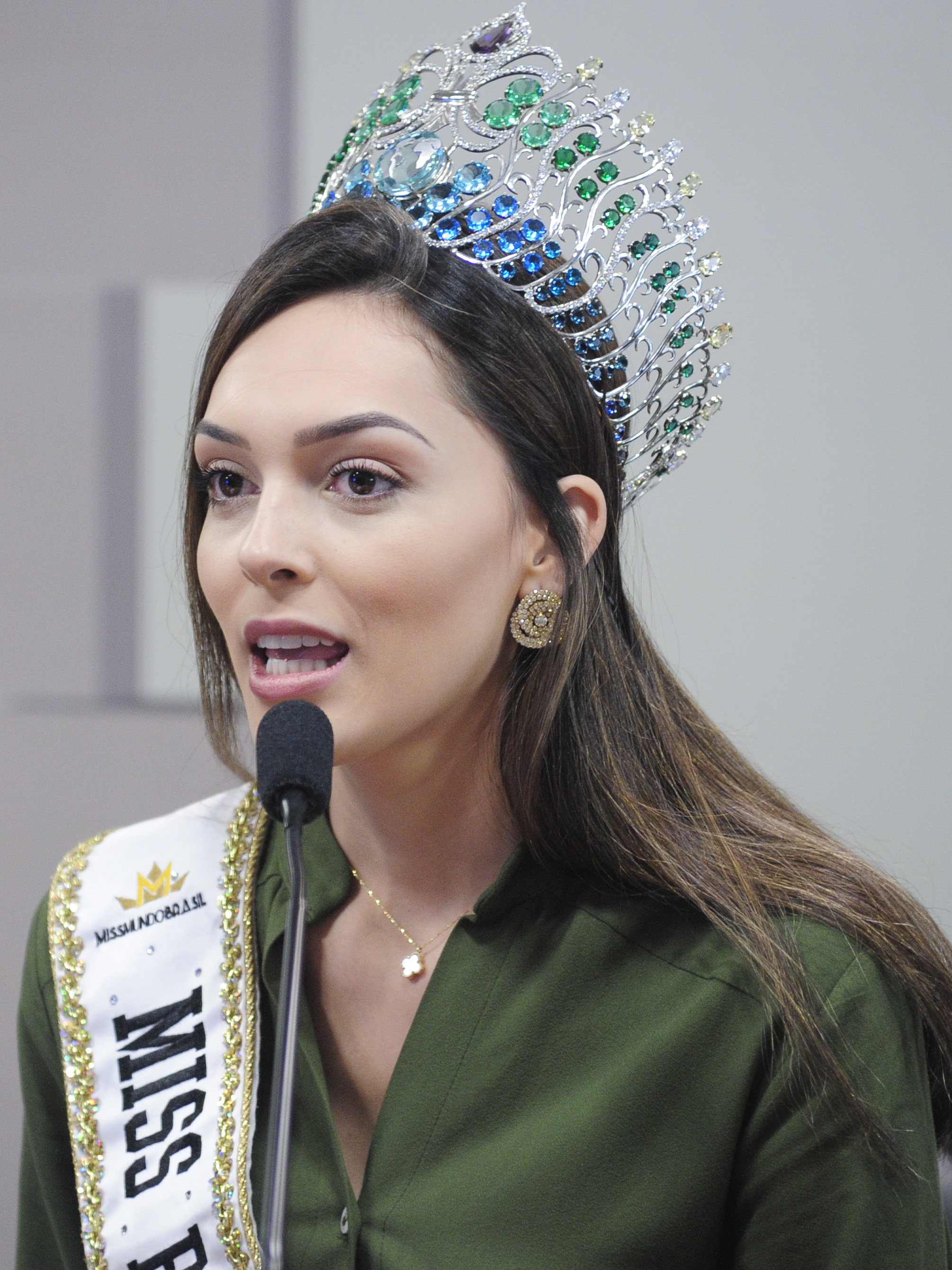
Miss Grand Brazil 2018
Gabrielle Vilela
Rio de Janeiro

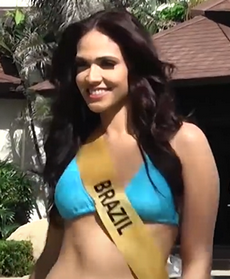
Miss Grand Brazil 2015
Paula Gomes
Mato Grosso do Sul

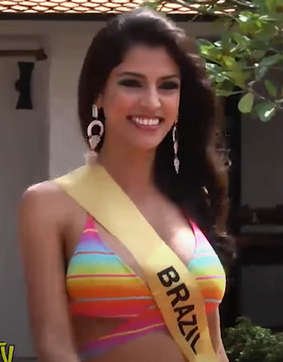
Miss Grand Brazil 2014
Yameme Ibrahim
Paraná

Winners by state

State	Number	Years
Rio Grande do Sul	3	2013; 2017; 2024
Paraná	2	2014; 2026
Paraíba	2	2020; 2025
Minas Gerais	2	2021; 2023
São Paulo	2	2019; 2022
Mato Grosso do Sul	2	2015; 2016
Rio de Janeiro	1	2018

by region

Region	Number	Last winning state
Southeast	5	Minas Gerais (2023)
South	5	Paraná (2026)
Northeast	2	Paraíba (2025)
Central-West	2	Mato Grosso do Sul (2016)
North	0	

== International competition ==
The following list is the Brazilian representatives who participated in the Miss Grand International pageant.

Color keys

- : Declared as the winner
- : Ended as a runner-up (Top 5)
- : Ended as a finalist (Top 10)
- : Ended as a semifinalist (Top 20/21/22)
- : Ended as special awards winner

Year	Representative	Title	Placement	Special Awards	National Director	Ref.
2026	Paula Assunção	Top 6 Miss Brazil 2025	Unplaced		Rodrigo Ferro	
2025	Kaliana Diniz	Miss Grand Brazil 2025	Top 22	Best National Costume	Evandro Hazzy	
2024	Talita Hartmann	Miss Grand Brazil 2024	1st runner-up (Note: Originally named the 4th runner-up, but was later promoted to the 1st runner-up following the dethronement and resignation of several 2024 top 5 finalists.)	Best in Swimsuit; Best National Costume	Evandro Hazzy	
2023	Adriana Yanca	Miss Grand Brazil 2023	Unplaced		Henrique Fontes	
2022	Isabella Menin	Miss Grand Brazil 2022	Winner		Henrique Fontes	
2021	Lorena Rodrigues	2nd runner-up Miss Grand Brazil 2019	2nd runner-up		Henrique Fontes	
2020	Lala Guedes	Miss Grand Brazil 2020	4th runner-up	Best in Swimsuit	Henrique Fontes	
2019	Marjorie Marcelle	Miss Grand Brazil 2019	4th runner-up		Henrique Fontes	
2018	Gabrielle Vilela	Miss Brazil CNB 2017	Top 20		Henrique Fontes	
2017	Caroline Venturini	Top 7 Miss Brazil World 2016	Top 20		Henrique Fontes	
2016	Renata Sena	1st runner-up Miss Brazil World 2016	Unplaced		Henrique Fontes	
2015	Paula Gomes	2nd runner-up Miss Brazil World 2015	Top 10		Henrique Fontes	
2014	Yameme Ibrahim	Miss Grand Brazil 2014	Top 20		Gerson Antonelli	
2013	Tamara de Costa Bicca	Top 16 Miss Brazil World 2013	Top 10		Henrique Fontes	

== National pageant finalists ==
=== Participating state representatives ===
The following list is the national finalists of the Miss Grand Brazil pageant, as well as the competition results.

Representatives	1st	2nd	3rd	4th	5th	6th	7th
States
Acre			Y		Y	Y	Y
Alagoas		12					Y
Amapá			Y			Y	Y
Amazonas		Y	15		20	Y	Y
Bahia	8	Y	9	9	Y	Y	
Ceará		9		Y	11	10	15
Distrito Federal	8	Y	12	16	Y	16	9
Espírito Santo	Y			Y		Y	Y
Goiás	8	Y	9	9	20	Y	9
Maranhão			12	12	11	16	Y
Mato Grosso	8	Y	Y		20	16	15
Mato Grosso do Sul	Y	15	15	16			Y
Minas Gerais			12	16		10	15
Pará	Y	12	Y	12	11	Y	
Paraíba		15		Y	Y	Y	
Paraná		12				16	9
Pernambuco		9	Y	Y		10	15
Piauí				Y	Y		Y
Rio de Janeiro			15	Y	11	10	
Rio Grande do Norte			9	16	Y	Y	Y
Rio Grande do Sul	Y	9	Y		20		15
Rondônia		Y	Y	Y		10	15
Roraima						16	Y
Santa Catarina	Y	9	Y	9	20	Y	
São Paulo			9	9	11	16	9
Sergipe		15				Y	Y
Tocantins	Y	Y	Y	Y			Y
Non States
Alto Cafezal							
Cânions Paulistas				Y			
Cataratas do Iguaçu					11		
Circuito das Frutas				Y	20		
Guanabara					20		
Ilhabela				Y	20		
Ilha Comprida				Y			
Ilha de São Luís					Y		
Ipiranga					Y		
Norte Mato-Grossense							
Olímpia	Y						
Plano Piloto				Y	20		
Sul Mineiro				Y			
Vale do Aço				12			
Zona da Mata Mineira				Y			
Total	14	22	22	31	28	27	27
Color keys: : Declared as the winner; : Ended as a 1st runner-up; : Ended as a 2nd runner-up; : Ended as a 3rd runner-up; : Ended as a 4th runner-up; A : Ended as a finalist, semifinalist and unplaced; × : Ended as withdrew during the competition; × : Ended as no representative
