= Miss Grand Brazil 2024 =

6th edition of the Miss Grand Brazil beauty pageant

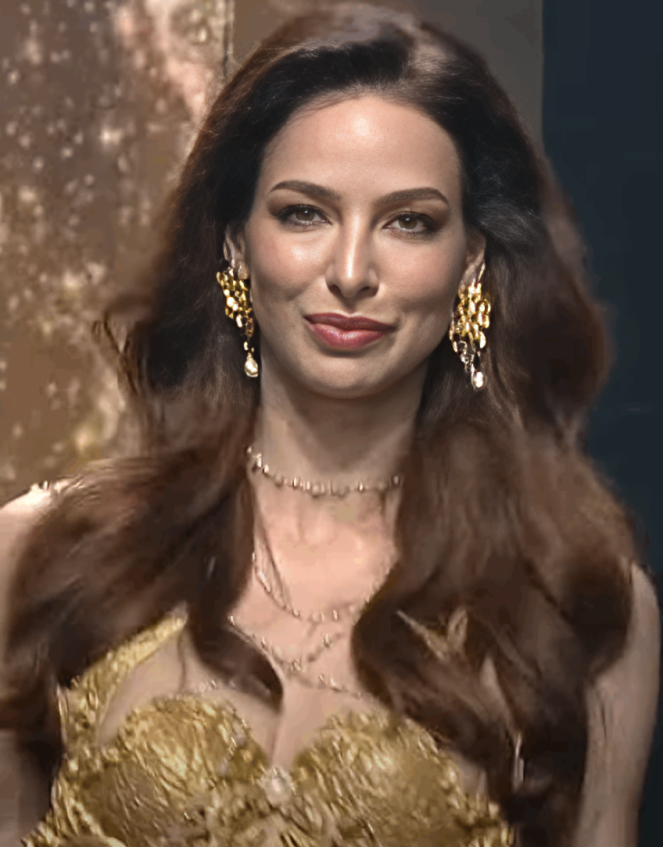
- Talita Hartmann, the winner of the contest
- Date: August 8, 2024
- Entertainment: Vanessa Jackson
- Venue: Tokio Marine Hall, São Paulo
- Broadcaster: Rede Brasil de Televisão; YouTube
- Entrants: 27
- Placements: 16
- Debuts: Amapá; Roraima
- Withdrawals: Cataratas do Iguaçu; Circuito das Frutas; Guanabara; Ilhabela; Ilha de São Luís; Ipiranga; Plano Piloto; Zona da Mata Mineira
- Returns: Alagoas; Espírito Santo; Mato Grosso do Sul; Rondônia; Sergipe
- Winner: Talita Hartmann (Rio Grande do Sul)

External videos
- Grand final competition

Miss Grand Brazil 2024 was the 6th edition of the Miss Grand Brazil pageant, held on August 8, 2024, at the Tokio Marine Hall, São Paulo. Candidates from 27 states and federal district of Brazil competed for the title. Of whom, a 27-year-old model representing Rio Grande do Sul, Talita Hartmann, was named the winner and received R$ 200,000 cash prize as the reward. Hartmann later represented the country at the international parent stage, Miss Grand International 2024, and was named the 4th runner-up.

The event featured a live performance by Vanessa Jackson, and was broadcast nationwide through the Rede Brasil de Televisão.

== Background ==
=== History ===
After the completion of the Miss Grand International 2023 pageant in Vietnam, the Miss Brazil CNB organization, headed by Henrique Fontes, began franchising the 2024 regional contest to local coordinators to select the state representatives for the Miss Grand Brazil 2024 pageant. Thus, several states organized the events and their representatives were elected such as Aline Biolchi of Paraná, Lara Rodrigues of Piauí, and Maria Eduarda Zordão of São Paulo.

However, Fontes later lost the national franchise to Evandro Hazzy of the Hazzy Top Talent agency in December 2023, causing the elected Miss Grand states under the CNB to be disqualified for the Miss Grand Brazil 2024 pageant, and were sent to compete at another Miss Brazil CNB-related pageant instead. New representatives were later elected by new local licensees accredited by Hazzy Top Talent.

=== Selection of contestants ===
Under the management of a new national licensee, the right to send delegates to compete in this year's edition was distributed to local organizers in all 27 federative units of Brazil. The local licensee then either organized an event to select their state representative or appointed an eligible girl to the title.

Any titles below the 27 federative-state level were prohibited in this edition, which caused eight cities, regions, and former states that competed in the 2023 competition to withdraw. Two states, Amapá and Roraima, were expected to make their debuts, while five states will return after being absent in the Miss Grand Brazil 2023 contest.

Twenty-seven contestants have been confirmed but only thirteen were elected directly through the 2024 state pageants. The following table details the state-level preliminary pageant for Miss Grand Brazil 2024.

List of Miss Grand Brazil 2024 preliminary pageants, by the coronation date
Pageant	Edition	Date & Venue	Entrants	Ref.
Miss Grand Pernambuco	1st	July 5, 2024, at the Palazzo Recepções Hall, Belo Jardim	11	
Miss Grand São Paulo	1st	July 11, 2024, at the Cine Teatro Auditório Alphaville, Barueri	10	
Miss Grand Maranhão	1st	July 12, 2024, at the Teatro Arthur Azevedo, São Luís	20	
Miss Grand Minas Gerais	3rd	July 14, 2024, at the Hotel Ouro Minas, Belo Horizonte	20	
Miss Grand Alagoas	1st	July 17, 2024, at the Teatro Deodoro, Maceió	18	
Miss Grand Pará	2nd	July 18, 2024, at the Teatro Maria Sylvia Nunes, Belém	11	
Miss Grand Espírito Santo	1st	July 19, 2024, at the Jaragua Tennis Club, Cachoeiro de Itapemirim	16	
Miss Grand Paraná (Note: The pageant's 2nd runner-up, Laila Frizon of Palotina, was later appointed Miss Grand Tocantins 2024.)	3rd	July 20, 2024, at the Teatro Calil Haddad, Maringá	24	
Miss Grand Mato Grosso	1st	July 26, 2024, at Goiabeiras Shopping, Cuiabá	12	
Miss Grand Goiás	1st	July 27, 2024, at the Anfiteatro Municipal, Aparecida de Goiânia	17	
Miss Grand Rio de Janeiro (Note: The pageant's finalists, Leylane Fernandes of Campos dos Goytacazes, Carolina Faria of Nova Friburgo and Maysa Victoria of São Francisco de Itabapoana, were later appointed Miss Grand Rondônia 2024, Miss Grand Roraima and Miss Grand Amapá 2024, respectively.)	3rd	July 30, 2024, at the Vivo Rio, Flamengo Park, Rio de Janeiro	27	
Miss Grand Santa Catarina	1st	July 30, 2024, at the Teatro da Liga, Joinville	9	
Miss Grand Bahia	1st	July 31, 2024, at the Teatro Alberto Martins, Camaçari	9	

== Results ==
=== Placements ===
Miss Grand Brazil 2024 competition result by state
Color key:
Winner	1st RU	2nd RU
3rd RU	4th RU	Top 10
Top 16	Unplaced	RU = Runner-up

Placement	Contestant
Miss Grand Brazil 2024	Rio Grande do Sul – Talita Hartmann
1st Runner-Up	Mato Grosso do Sul – Loraine Lumatelli
2nd Runner-Up	Alagoas – Laila Vieira
3rd Runner-Up	Tocantins – Laila Frizon
4th Runner-Up	Piauí – Cecilia Almeida
Top 10	Ceará – Júlia Maia; Minas Gerais – Bruna Rezende; Pernambuco – Débora Valença; Rio de Janeiro – Andrieli Rozin; Rondônia – Leylane Fernandes §
Top 16	Distrito Federal – Maisha Castro; Maranhão – Júlia Albuquerque; Mato Grosso – Taiany Zimpel; Paraná – Jessica Aguiar; Roraima – Carolina Faria; São Paulo – Yuna Hipólito

§ – Voted into the Top 10 by viewers

=== Special awards ===
Award	Contestant
Best State Costume	Espírito Santo – Yasmin Luize
Miss Popular Vote	Rondônia – Leylane Fernandes

== Candidates ==
Number of participants classified by representative selection methods
Method	Number (%)
State pageant	13 (48.15%)
Appointed	14 (51.85%)

The 27 candidates have been selected for the pageant:

State	Contestant	Age (Note: Ages at the time of the pageant)
Acre	Isabella Gomes	22
Alagoas	Laila Vieira	23
Amapá	Maysa Victoria Pinheiro	23
Amazonas	Mariana Barroso	24
Bahia	Rayssa Santos	19
Ceará	Júlia Maia	21
Distrito Federal	Maisha Castro	24
Espírito Santo	Yasmin Luize	19
Goiás	Samara Ferreira	24
Maranhão	Júlia Albuquerque	23
Mato Grosso (Note: On July 29, 2024, the winner of the state pageant, Maria Vitória Rondon, resigned. Later, the 1st runner-up, Taiany Zimpel, assumed.)	Taiany Zimpel	26
Mato Grosso do Sul	Loraine Lumatelli	23
Minas Gerais	Bruna Rezende	28
Pará	Karla Carneiro	20
Paraíba	Ana Beatriz Alves	22
Paraná	Jessica Aguiar	23
Pernambuco	Débora Valença	27
Piauí	Cecilia Almeida	25
Rio de Janeiro	Andrieli Rozin	26
Rio Grande do Norte	Gersiana Duarte	27
Rio Grande do Sul	Talita Hartmann	27
Rondônia	Leylane Fernandes	28
Roraima	Carolina Faria	22
Santa Catarina	Eduarda Freiberger	24
São Paulo	Yuna Hipólito	24
Sergipe	Jamilly Campos	19
Tocantins	Laila Frizon	22
