= Adriana Yanca =

Brazilian beauty pageant titleholder

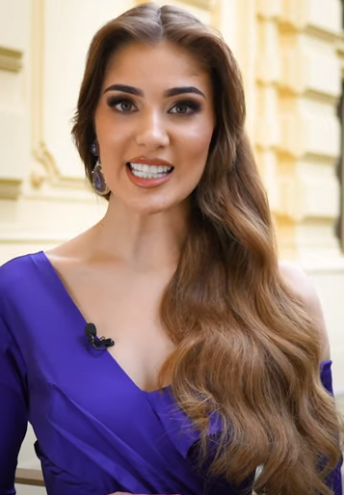
- Yanca in 2023
- Born: Adriana Yanca Rodrigues Alves; Rio de Janeiro, Brazil
- Beauty pageant titleholder
- Title: Miss Grand Brazil 2023
- Major competitions: Miss Brazil CNB 2021 (Top25); Miss Supranational Brazil 2022 (4th runner-up); Miss Grand Brazil 2023 (Winner); Miss Grand International 2023 (Unplaced)

Adriana Yanca Rodrigues Alves is a Brazilian beauty pageant titleholder. She has competed in Miss Brazil CNB 2021 and Miss Supranational Brazil 2022, and was the winner of Miss Grand Brazil 2023. Yanca represented Brazil at Miss Grand International 2023 but was unplaced.

== Pageantry ==
Yanca previously participated in Miss Brazil CNB 2021 representing Costa Branca, and was placed among the top 25 finalists. After that, she participated in the Miss Supranational Brazil 2022 pageant and was fourth runner-up.

Later in 2023, Yanca returned to compete again at Miss Grand Brazil 2023. She was the representative of Zona da Mata Mineira and later won Miss Grand Brazil 2023 in June, succeeding the current MGI, Isabella Menin, in Brazil, against 27 other candidates.

Awards and achievements
Preceded by Isabella Menin	Miss Grand Brazil; 2023	Succeeded by Talita Hartmann
