= Miss Brazil CNB 2021 =

- Date: August 19, 2021
- Presenters: Juliano Crema
- Entertainment: DJ Gabriel Souza
- Venue: Brasília Palace Hotel, Brasília, Distrito Federal, Brazil
- Broadcaster: Livestream (YouTube)
- Entrants: 48
- Placements: 25
- Winner: Caroline Teixeira; Distrito Federal
- Congeniality: Carolina Borsatto; Lagoas & Mares do Sul
- Photogenic: Gabriela Melo; Ceará

Miss Brazil CNB 2021 was the 31st edition of the Miss Brazil CNB pageant and the 6th under CNB Miss Brazil. The contest took place on August 19, 2021. Each state, the Federal District and various Insular Regions & Cities competed for the title. Elís Miele Coelho of Espírito Santo crowned her successor, Caroline Teixeira of Distrito Federal at the end of the contest. Teixeira will represent Brazil at Miss World 2021. The contest was held at the Brasília Palace Hotel in Brasília, Distrito Federal, Brazil. This year's contest was originally supposed to take place in 2020 but was delayed to 2021 due to the COVID-19 pandemic.

== Results ==
| Final results | Contestant |
|---|---|
| Miss Brazil CNB 2021/2020 | Distrito Federal - Caroline Teixeira |
| 1st Runner-up | Rio Grande do Sul - Alina Furtado |
| 2nd Runner-up | Espírito Santo - Gabriela Botelho |
| Top 6 | Mato Grosso do Sul - Dandara Queiroz; Pernambuco - Guilhermina Montarroyos; Piauí - Larissa Barros |
| Top 12 | Goiás - Ariely Stoczyński; Guanabara - Marcele Cataldo; (South Korea) Korea-Brazil - Larissa Han; (Rio Grande do Sul) Pampa Gaúcho - Andrieli Rozin; Pará - Maria Carolina Costa; Rio de Janeiro - Janaína Ribeiro |
| Top 25 | Amazonas - Julliana Pachêco; Bahia - Odara Skubinčan; Brasília - Ludymila Monteiro; (Rio Grande do Norte) Costa Branca - Adriana Yanca; (Santa Catarina (state)) Costa Verde & Mar - Mayara Heydt; (Alagoas) Lagoas & Mares do Sul - Carolina Borsatto; Maranhão - Flávia Melo; Paraná - Ana Finkler; Planalto Central - Giulia Melles; Plano Piloto - Karina Souza; Rio Grande do Norte - Andreza Viana; São Paulo - Cibele Lorente; Tocantins - Milena Silva |

=== Regional Queens of Beauty ===
| Award | Winner |
|---|---|
| Miss Midwest | Mato Grosso do Sul - Dandara Queiroz |
| Miss North | Pará - Maria Carolina Costa |
| Miss Northeast | Piauí - Larissa Barros |
| Miss South | Rio Grande do Sul - Alina Furtado |
| Miss Southeast | Espírito Santo - Gabriela Botelho |

=== Special Awards ===
| Award | Winner |
|---|---|
| Best Interview | Piauí - Larissa Barros |
| Best Skin | Rio de Janeiro - Janaína Ribeiro |
| Best Smile | Rio Grande do Sul - Alina Furtado |
| Miss Congeniality | (Alagoas) Lagoas & Mares do Sul - Carolina Borsatto |
| Miss Cordiality | Ipiranga - Daniele França |
| Miss Elegance | Distrito Federal - Caroline Teixeira |
| Miss Personality | Central Goiás - Rayka Vieira |
| Miss Photogenic | Ceará - Gabriela Melo |
| Miss Popularity | (Santa Catarina (state)) Costa Verde & Mar - Mayara Heydt |
| Most Beautiful dress | Goiás - Ariely Stoczyński |
| 40th Revelation Model | Mato Grosso do Sul - Dandara Queiroz |

== Challenge Events ==
=== Beauty with a Purpose ===
| Final results | Contestant |
|---|---|
| Winner | Espírito Santo - Gabriela Botelho |
| Top 5 | Bahia - Odara Skubinčan; Maranhão - Flávia Melo; Plano Piloto - Karina Souza; Rio Grande do Norte - Andreza Viana |

=== Cover Girl ===
| Final results | Contestant |
|---|---|
| Winner | Piauí - Larissa Barros |

=== dōTERRA Business Challenge ===
| Final results | Contestant |
|---|---|
| Winner | Tocantins - Milena Silva |

=== Miss Mobstar/Miss Multimedia ===
| Final results | Contestant |
|---|---|
| Winner | Espírito Santo - Gabriela Botelho |

=== Miss Talent ===
| Final results | Contestant |
|---|---|
| Winner | Planalto Central - Giulia Melles |

=== Regional Costume ===
| Final results | Contestant |
|---|---|
| Winner | Pará - Maria Carolina Costa |

=== Top Model ===
| Final results | Contestant |
|---|---|
| Winner | Distrito Federal - Caroline Teixeira |

== Delegates ==
The delegates for Miss Brazil CNB 2021 were:

| Represented | Contestant | Age (Note: Ages at the time of the pageant) | Hometown | Placement |
|---|---|---|---|---|
| (São Paulo (state)) ABCD Region | Pâmela Tiglia | 22 | São Bernardo do Campo, SP | |
| Acre | Emely Pérez | 22 | Cruzeiro do Sul | |
| Alagoas | Vitória Alcântara | 20 | Maceió | |
| Amapá | Abthyllane Amaral | 24 | Macapá | |
| Amazonas | Julliana Pachêco | 26 | Presidente Figueiredo | Top 25 |
| Bahia | Odara Skubinčan | 21 | Além Paraíba, MG | Top 25 |
| Brasília | Ludymila Monteiro | 20 | Brasília, DF | Top 25 |
| Ceará | Gabriela Melo | 19 | Icó | |
| Central Goiás | Rayka Vieira | 25 | Anápolis | |
| (Rio Grande do Norte) Costa Branca | Adriana Yanca | 23 | Nova Iguaçu, RJ | Top 25 |
| (Santa Catarina (state)) Costa Verde & Mar | Mayara Heydt | 22 | Cunha Porã, SC | Top 25 |
| Distrito Federal | Caroline Teixeira | 22 | Brasília, DF | Miss Brazil CNB 2021/2020 |
| Espírito Santo | Gabriela Botelho | 19 | Belo Horizonte, MG | 2nd Runner-up |
| (Minas Gerais) Estrada Real | Ana Luiza Rigueira | 18 | Coronel Fabriciano, MG | |
| Fernando de Noronha | Stella Cabral | 25 | Olinda, PE | |
| Goiás | Ariely Stoczyński | 25 | Goiânia | Top 12 |
| Greater Curitiba | Letícia Cocito | 18 | Curitiba, PR | |
| Greater São Paulo | Nicole Hadassa | 23 | Borrazópolis, PR | |
| Guanabara | Marcele Cataldo | 23 | Rio de Janeiro, RJ | Top 12 |
| Ilhabela | Ariana de Melo | 26 | Arcoverde, PE | |
| (Paraná (state)) Ilha do Mel | Beatriz Benetti | 26 | Brasília, DF | |
| Ipiranga | Daniele França | 25 | São Paulo, SP | |
| (South Korea) Korea-Brazil | Larissa Han | 26 | São Paulo, SP | Top 12 |
| (Alagoas) Lagoas & Mares do Sul | Carolina Borsatto | 25 | Viçosa, AL | Top 25 |
| (Maranhão) Lençóis Maranhenses | Gabrielly Aranha | 23 | Brasília, DF | |
| Maranhão | Flávia Melo | 22 | São Luís | Top 25 |
| Mato Grosso | Luana Vedana | 18 | Sorriso | |
| Mato Grosso do Sul | Dandara Queiroz | 22 | Três Lagoas | Top 6 |
| Minas Gerais | Rayane Araújo | 21 | Sete Lagoas | |
| (Rio Grande do Sul) Pampa Gaúcho | Andrieli Rozin | 22 | São Lourenço do Sul, RS | Top 12 |
| Pará | Maria Carolina Costa | 20 | Belém | Top 12 |
| Paraíba | Ingrid Vidal | 19 | Campina Grande | |
| Paraná | Ana Finkler | 24 | Cascavel | Top 25 |
| (Goiás) Pegadas no Cerrado | Andrielly Azevêdo | 19 | Rio Verde, GO | |
| Pernambuco | Guilhermina Montarroyos | 20 | Moreno | Top 6 |
| Planalto Central | Giulia Melles | 19 | Brasília, DF | Top 25 |
| Plano Piloto | Karina Souza | 24 | Brasília, DF | Top 25 |
| Piauí | Larissa Barros | 24 | Teresina | Top 6 |
| Rio de Janeiro | Janaína Ribeiro | 25 | Itatiaia | Top 12 |
| Rio Grande do Norte | Andreza Viana | 20 | Acari | Top 25 |
| Rio Grande do Sul | Alina Furtado | 25 | Pelotas | 1st Runner-up |
| Rondônia | Priscila Santos | 20 | Ministro Andreazza | |
| Santa Catarina | Isadora Pereira | 18 | Garopaba | |
| São Paulo | Cibele Lorente | 23 | Campinas | Top 25 |
| Sergipe | Emilly Andrade | 18 | Ribeirópolis | |
| (Minas Gerais) Sul de Minas | Larissa Lima | 20 | Andradas, MG | |
| Tocantins | Milena Silva | 22 | Palmas | Top 25 |
| (Minas Gerais) Triângulo Mineiro | Bruna Rodarte | 18 | Patos de Minas, MG | |

== Notes ==
=== Withdrawals ===
- Roraima - Natali Vitória

=== Replacements ===
- Rio Grande do Norte - Andreza Viana replaced Paula Joseane after Joseane withdrew from the pageant.
