= Miss Brazil World 2016 =

- Date: June 25, 2016
- Presenters: Chris Barth; Juliano Crema; Alessandro Boiah
- Entertainment: Paula Gomes
- Venue: Resort Il Campanario, Florianópolis, Santa Catarina, Brazil
- Broadcaster: Record News
- Entrants: 41
- Placements: 16
- Winner: Beatrice Fontoura; Goiás
- Congeniality: Kelly Sendy (Mato Grosso) Pantanal
- Photogenic: Beatrice Fontoura; Goiás

Miss Brazil World 2016 was the 27th edition of the Miss Brazil World pageant and the 2nd under CNB Miss Brazil. The contest took place on June 25, 2016. Each state, the Federal District and various Insular Regions & Cities competed for the title. Catharina Choi of Ilhabela crowned her successor, Beatrice Fontoura of Goiás at the end of the contest. Fontoura represented Brazil at Miss World 2016. The contest was held at the Resort Il Campanario in Florianópolis, Santa Catarina, Brazil.

== Results ==
Final results	Contestant
Miss Brazil World 2016	Goiás - Beatrice Fontoura
1st Runner-up (Vice-Miss Brazil World 2016)	Mato Grosso do Sul - Renata Sena
2nd Runner-up (1st Princess)	Espírito Santo - Stephany Pim
3rd Runner-up (2nd Princess)	(Rio Grande do Sul) Pampa Gaúcho - Samen dos Santos
4th Runner-up (3rd Princess)	Encantos do Sul - Francielly Ouriques
Top 7	Rio Grande do Sul - Caroline Venturini; São Paulo - Isabele Pandini
Top 16	Ceará - Raíra Cendi; (Rio Grande do Sul) Ilha da Pintada - Jheniffer Ev; (Rio Grande do Sul) Ilha dos Lobos - Gabriela Frühauf; Ilhas de Búzios - Vitória Félix; Minas Gerais - Mariana Vieira; (Rio Grande do Sul) Missões - Muriel Prestes; (Mato Grosso) Pantanal - Kelly Sendy; Paraná - Taynara Gargantini; Pernambuco - Leidyane Vasconcelos

=== Regional Queens of Beauty ===
Award	Winner
Miss Midwest	Goiás - Beatrice Fontoura
Miss North	Pará - Victória Tereza
Miss Northeast	Pernambuco - Leidyane Vasconcelos
Miss South	(Rio Grande do Sul) Pampa Gaúcho - Samen dos Santos
Miss Southeast	Espírito Santo - Stephany Pim

=== Special awards ===
Award	Winner
Best Hair	Pará - Victória Tereza
Best Smile	Espírito Santo - Stephany Pim
Miss Congeniality	Goiás - Beatrice Fontoura
Miss Cordiality	(Mato Grosso) Ilhas do Araguaia - Jhaddy Hayra
Miss Elegance	Alagoas - Jucyelly Pereira
Miss Fitness & Health	Mato Grosso do Sul - Renata Sena
Miss New Face 40°	Goiás - Beatrice Fontoura
Miss Personality	(Rio Grande do Sul) Vale dos Sinos - Carol Luz
Miss Photogenic	(Mato Grosso) Pantanal - Kelly Sendy

== Challenge Events ==
=== Beauty with a Purpose ===
Final results	Contestant
Winner	Minas Gerais - Mariana Vieira
1st Runner-Up	Encantos do Sul - Francielly Ouriques
2nd Runner-Up	(Mato Grosso) Pantanal - Kelly Sendy
Top 5	(Rio Grande do Sul) Ilha dos Lobos - Gabriela Frühauf; (Rio Grande do Sul) Missões - Muriel Prestes

=== Beauty & Photography ===
Final results	Contestant
Winner	Goiás - Beatrice Fontoura
1st Runner-Up	São Paulo - Isabele Pandini
2nd Runner-Up	Espírito Santo - Stephany Pim
Top 5	Mato Grosso do Sul - Renata Sena; Rio Grande do Sul - Caroline Venturini

=== Best in Interview ===
Final results	Contestant
Winner	Espírito Santo - Stephany Pim
1st Runner-Up	Mato Grosso do Sul - Renata Sena
2nd Runner-Up	Pernambuco - Leidyane Vasconcelos
Top 5	Rio Grande do Norte - Vanessa Muniz; (Minas Gerais) Triângulo Mineiro - Marianne Faina

=== Miss Popularity ===
Final results	Contestant
Winner	(Mato Grosso) Pantanal - Kelly Sendy

=== Miss Talent ===
Final results	Contestant
Winner	Mato Grosso do Sul - Renata Sena
1st Runner-Up	(Rio Grande do Sul) Pampa Gaúcho - Samen dos Santos
2nd Runner-Up	Espírito Santo - Stephany Pim
Top 10	Amazonas - Tayana Maia; (Goiás) Cerrado Goiano - Laís Gava; Distrito Federal - Carolline Torres; Encantos do Sul - Francielly Ouriques; Ilhas de Búzios - Vitória Félix; (Santa Catarina (state)) Jurerê Internacional - Nayara Silveira; Vale do Itajaí - Letícia Angelino

=== Miss Top Model ===
Final results	Contestant
Winner	Goiás - Beatrice Fontoura
1st Runner-Up (Tie)	(Rio Grande do Sul) Pampa Gaúcho - Samen dos Santos
1st Runner-Up (Tie)	São Paulo - Isabele Pandini
Top 5	(Rio Grande do Sul) Ilha da Pintada - Jheniffer Ev; Paraná - Taynara Gargantini

=== Night Fashion ===
Final results	Contestant
Winner	São Paulo - Isabele Pandini
1st Runner-Up	Goiás - Beatrice Fontoura
2nd Runner-Up	Ilhas de Búzios - Vitória Félix
Top 5	Alagoas - Jucyelly Pereira; (Paraná (state)) Cataratas do Iguaçu - Tamíres Terrazon

=== Sports ===
Final results	Contestant
Winner	Minas Gerais - Mariana Vieira
Top 5	Amazonas - Tayana Maia; (Mato Grosso) Ilhas do Araguaia - Jhaddy Hayra; Paraná - Taynara Gargantini; Rondônia - Karliany Barbosa

== Delegates ==
The delegates for Miss Brazil World 2016 were:

=== States ===
- Alagoas - Jucyelly Pereira
- Amapá - Brena Wanzeler
- Amazonas - Tayana Maia
- Bahia - Lavínia Calumby
- Ceará - Raíra Cendi
- Distrito Federal - Carolline Torres
- Espírito Santo - Stephany Pim
- Goiás - Beatrice Fontoura
- Mato Grosso - Amanda Barbacena
- Mato Grosso do Sul - Renata Sena
- Minas Gerais - Mariana Vieira
- Pará - Victória Pinto
- Paraná - Taynara Gargantini
- Pernambuco - Leidyane Vasconcelos
- Rio de Janeiro - Carolina Ermel
- Rio Grande do Norte - Vanessa Muniz
- Rio Grande do Sul - Caroline Venturini
- Rondônia - Karliany Barbosa
- Santa Catarina - Nayara Guimarães
- São Paulo - Isabele Pandini
- Sergipe - Katiúscia Menezes

=== Insular Regions and Cities ===
- (Paraná (state)) Cataratas do Iguaçu - Tamíres Terrazon
- (Goiás) Cerrado Goiano - Laís Gava
- (Santa Catarina (state)) Costa Verde & Mar - Sara Ramos
- Encantos do Sul - Francielly Ouriques
- Greater Florianópolis - Flaviane Elias
- (Rio Grande do Sul) Ilha da Pintada - Jheniffer Ev
- (Paraná (state)) Ilha do Mel - Katherin Strickert
- (Rio Grande do Sul) Ilha dos Lobos - Gabriela Frühauf
- Ilhas de Búzios - Vitória Félix
- (Mato Grosso) Ilhas do Araguaia - Jhaddy Hayra
- (Santa Catarina (state)) Jurerê Internacional - Nayara Silveira
- (Pará) Marajó - Yasmin Engelke
- (Rio Grande do Sul) Missões - Muriel Prestes
- (Rio Grande do Sul) Pampa Gaúcho - Samen dos Santos
- (Mato Grosso) Pantanal - Kelly Sendy
- Plano Piloto - Ana Gabriela Borges
- (Minas Gerais) Triângulo Mineiro - Marianne Faina
- Vale do Itajaí - Letícia Angelino
- (Rio Grande do Sul) Vale dos Sinos - Carolina Luz
- Vale Europeu - Nicoli Lindner

== Notes ==
=== Replacements ===
- Mato Grosso - Jéssica Duarte was originally supposed to represent Mato Grosso at Miss Brazil World 2016 but withdrew and was replaced by Amanda Barbacena.

=== Withdrawals ===
- Great West - Kimberly Maciel
- Ilhabela - Alice Silva
- (Tocantins) Ilha do Bananal - Marcela Castro
- Roraima - Mariana Andrade
- Vale do Araguaia - Mikaela Freitas

=== Did not compete ===
- Acre
- Maranhão
- Paraíba
- Piauí
- Tocantins
