= Miss Grand Brazil 2025 =

6th edition of the Miss Grand Brazil beauty pageant

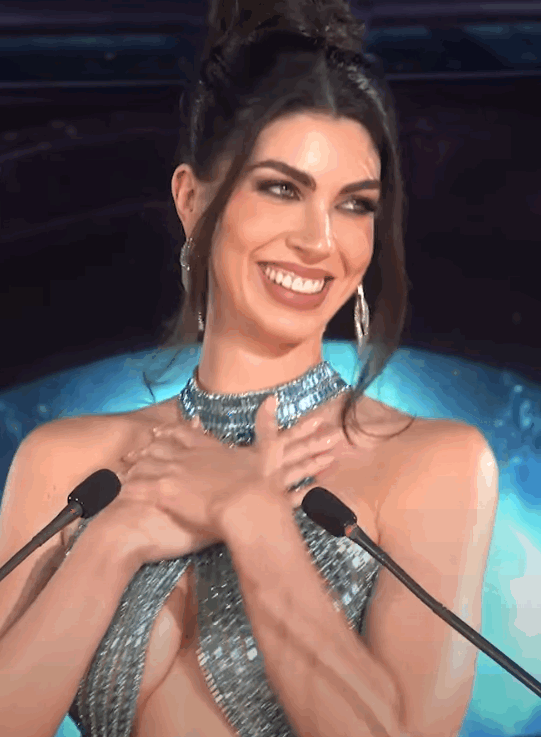
- Kaliana Diniz, the winner of the contest
- Date: 6 July 2025
- Presenters: Chris Barth; Karol Morais
- Venue: Centro de Convenções Espaço Immensità, São Paulo
- Broadcaster: YouTube
- Entrants: 27
- Placements: 15
- Winner: Kaliana Diniz (Paraíba)

Competition logo

External videos
- Grand final competition

Miss Grand Brazil 2025 was the 7th edition of the Miss Grand Brazil beauty pageant and was held on 6 July 2025, at the Centro de Convenções Espaço Immensità, São Paulo. Contestants from all 27 states and federal district of Brazil competed for the title.

At the end of the event, Talita Hartmann from Rio Grande do Sul crowned Kaliana Diniz from Paraíba, who represented the country at Miss Grand International 2025 in Thailand.

== Background ==
=== History ===
After announcing that he would still be directing the pageant in 2025, Evandro Hazzy, the current holder of the Miss Grand International license in Brazil, released the official song for this edition of the pageant, titled "Sinta o Brasil" (lit. 'Feel Brazil'), on 20 December 2024. Later on 25 April, the Centro de Convenções Espaço Immensità located in São Paulo was announced as the venue for the grand final, which was set for 6 July 2025.

=== Replacements ===
Eduarda Dallagnol, Miss Grand Rio de Janeiro, resigned to pursue other professional opportunities and was later replaced by Ana Beatriz Nazareno.

Joyce Kelly, Miss Grand Rio Grande do Norte, resigned for undisclosed reasons and was replaced by Joyce Santana.

Due to health issues, Camila Albuquerque resigned as Miss Grand Pernambuco, and the first runner-up, Joyce Saraiva, assumed the title.

Marina Pacífico Ramos, Miss Grand Ceará, and Leidiane Mesquita, Miss Grand Tocantins, resigned for health reasons and were replaced by Amanda Lima and Maria Antônia Lima, respectively.

Isadora Frucri, Miss Grand Rondônia, withdrew from the competition for unknown reasons and was replaced by Ana Liz Bittencourt.

=== Selection of contestants ===
Twenty-seven contestants have been confirmed, but only five were elected through a 2025 state pageant, reduced from 13 in the 2024 edition.

The following is the list of Miss Grand Brazil 2025 preliminary pageants, by coronation date.

Pageant	Edition	Date & Venue	Entrants	Ref.
Miss Grand Distrito Federal	1st	19 April 2025, at the Auditório - Uniprojeção Taguatinga, Taguatinga	16	
Miss Grand Paraíba	1st	24 May 2025, at the Teatro Santa Catarina, Cabedelo	9	
Miss Grand Pernambuco	2nd	29 May 2025, at the Centro de Convenções do Senac, Caruaru	8	
Miss Grand Amapá	1st	30 May 2025, at the Senac Amapá, Macapá	3	
Miss Grand Maranhão	2nd	31 May 2025, at the Teatro Zenira Fiquene, São Luís	14	

== Results ==
=== Placements ===
Miss Grand Brazil 2025 competition result by state
Color key:
Winner	1st RU	2nd RU
3rd RU	4th RU	Top 9
Top 15	Unplaced	RU = Runner-up

Placement	Contestant
Miss Grand Brazil 2025	Paraíba - Kaliana Diniz
1st Runner-Up	Pará - Monã Vianna
2nd Runner-Up	Rio de Janeiro - Ana Beatriz Nazareno
3rd Runner-Up	Bahia - Ananda Santos
4th Runner-Up	Santa Catarina - Thaís de Souza Bonatti
Top 9	Distrito Federal - Maritza Martins; Goiás - Lorena Campos §; Paraná - Kimberly Rhiane; São Paulo - Ana Carolina Rodrigues
Top 15	Ceará - Amanda Lima; Mato Grosso - Jessfaine Macêdo; Minas Gerais - Anne Alice Rhein; Pernambuco - Joyce Saraiva; Rio Grande do Sul - Bianca Becker; Rondônia - Ana Liz Bittencourt

§ – Voted into the Top 9 by viewers

=== Special awards ===
Award	Contestant
Best in Swimsuit	Bahia - Ananda Santos
Best State Costume	Piauí - Pietra Aguiar
Miss Popular Vote	Goiás - Lorena Campos

Award	Director
Best State Director	Paraíba - Christian Oliver

== Candidates ==
Number of participants classified by representative selection methods
Category	Number (%)
State winner (Note: State-level pageant winner)	5 (18.52%)
Appointed (Note: Appointed to the title without competing in any related 2025 state pageants.)	22 (81.48%)
_________________________________________

27 contestants competed for the title:

State	Contestant	Age (Note: Ages at the time of the pageant)	Hometown
Acre	Guilheny Abramamoski (Note: Appointed to the title without participating in any related 2025 state pageants.)	23	Rio Branco
Alagoas	Maria Leide Noia	22	Maceió
Amapá	Eline Cruz	29	Macapá
Amazonas	Ingrid Modesto	21	Manaus
Bahia	Ananda Santos	27	Salvador
Ceará	Amanda Lima	27	Fortaleza
Distrito Federal	Maritza Martins	22	Paranoá
Espírito Santo	Amanda Marinato	18	Cachoeiro de Itapemirim
Goiás	Lorena Campos	24	Goianápolis
Maranhão	Beatriz Medrado	26	Buriticupu
Mato Grosso	Jessfaine Macêdo	20	-
Mato Grosso do Sul	Thalyta Kézia Rafachinho	20	Três Lagoas
Minas Gerais	Anne Alice Rhein	25	Domingos Martins
Pará	Monã Vianna	21	Belém
Paraíba	Kaliana Diniz	25	Nova Floresta
Paraná	Kimberly Rhiane	29	Curitiba
Pernambuco	Joyce Saraiva	20	Recife
Piauí	Pietra Aguiar	27	Castelo do Piauí
Rio de Janeiro	Ana Beatriz Nazareno	28	Mata Roma
Rio Grande do Norte	Joyce Santana	22	João Pessoa
Rio Grande do Sul	Bianca Becker	25	Passo Fundo
Rondônia	Ana Liz Bittencourt	22	Campos dos Goytacazes
Roraima	Iandra Kellen Assunção	23	Caracaraí
Santa Catarina	Thaís de Souza Bonatti	27	Blumenau
São Paulo	Ana Carolina Rodrigues	26	-
Sergipe	Thuyline Dyandra	26	Queimados
Tocantins	Maria Antônia Lima	21	-

== List of state coordinators ==
The following is a list of local organizers accredited by the national agent to select their respective state representative for this year's contest.

- Acre – Meyre Manaus
- Alagoas – Márcio Mattos
- Amapá – Lucas Ferreira
- Amazonas – Joao Paulo
- Bahia – Kaênia Santana
- Ceará – Samuel Oliveira
- Distrito Federal – Overlan Oliveira
- Espírito Santo – Marinho Freitas
- Goiás – Leandro Crosara (1)
- Maranhão – Marcio Prado
- Mato Grosso – Warner Willon
- Mato Grosso do Sul – Marcos Afonso
- Minas Gerais – Adriana Macedo
- Pará – Herculano Silva
- Paraíba – Christian Oliver
- Paraná – Marta Cathiusse
- Pernambuco – Erisson Silva
- Piauí – Cézar Araújo
- Rio de Janeiro – Adriano André
- Rio Grande do Norte – Kenya Siqueira
- Rio Grande do Sul – Sandra Ávila
- Rondônia – Nayara Ferreira
- Roraima – Paulo Silas Valente
- Santa Catarina – Tulio Cordeiro
- São Paulo – Adriano Moran
- Sergipe – Bruce Jarod
- Tocantins – Leandro Crosara (2)
