= Talita Hartmann =

Peruvian beauty pageant titleholder (born 1997)

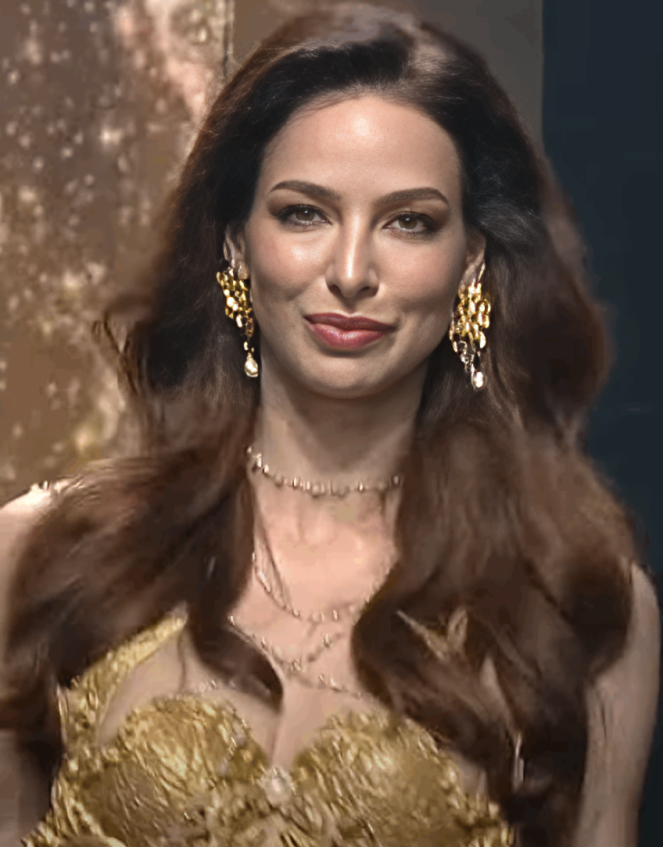
- Talita Hartmann in 2024
- Born: May 7, 1997 (age 29); São Vicente do Sul, Rio Grande do Sul, Brazil
- Beauty pageant titleholder
- Title: Miss Grand Brazil 2024
- Major competitions: Miss Grand Brazil 2024; (Winner); Miss Grand International 2024; (1st Runner-Up; Assumed)

Talita Hartmann (born May 7, 1997) is a Brazilian model and pageant titleholder. She was crowned Miss Grand Brazil 2024 and later placed as 1st Runner-Up at Miss Grand International 2024.

== Early life and modelling career ==
Hartmann was born on May 7, 1997, in São Vicente do Sul. She began her modelling career at the age of 14, with her first international assignment in Tokyo, Japan in 2011. Over the years, she worked across several continents and for notable fashion brands, gaining recognition for her professionalism, poise, and strong representation of Brazilian heritage.

== Pageantry ==
=== Miss Grand Brazil 2024 ===
On August 8, 2024, Talita represented the state of Rio Grande do Sul at Miss Grand Brazil 2024, held at Tokio Marine Hall in São Paulo. Among 27 contestants, she emerged as the winner and received a cash prize of R$200,000.

=== Miss Grand International 2024 ===
Hartmann represented Brazil at Miss Grand International 2024 in Bangkok, Thailand. She was initially declared as the 4th Runner-Up, but following several resignations and dethronements within the top finalists, she was officially promoted to 1st Runner-Up. Additionally, she won awards for Best in Swimsuit and Best National Costume.

== Additional highlights ==
Hartmann's journey reflects her passion ,qualities that bolstered her success on the global stage.

Awards and achievements
| Preceded by CJ Opiaza | 1st Runner-up Miss Grand International (Assumed); 2024 | Succeeded by (Thailand) Sarunrat Puagpipat |
| Preceded by Lê Hoàng Phương | 4th Runner-up Miss Grand International; 2024 | Succeeded by María Felix |
| Preceded by Adriana Yanca | Miss Grand Brazil; 2024 | Succeeded by Kaliana Diniz |
