= Missões =

Region of Rio Grande do Sul, Brazil

Missões, Brazil is a region of Rio Grande do Sul in Brazil roughly occupying the same area previously dominated by the colonial missions founded by Saint Roque González.

The Missões region is located in the northwestern part of the state and is part of a larger missions' settlement system, extending into Argentina, and other neighboring countries. Which in turn were part of a larger project, the Spanish missions in South America.

== Minority languages ==
The majority of present population of the Missões region first began to arrive in this area starting only over one hundred years ago. Therefore, about three centuries after the original historical Jesuit missions had long vanished and what had been left of the native Christianized population had dispersed, reverting into their traditional semi-nomadic way of living.

The more recent settlements, in great part by transplanted by Europeans from old settlements on the eastern part of the state, brought with them their minority immigrant languages which are still in use today in greater or lesser extent throughout the countryside, in hamlets, towns and municipalities. German is by far being the most commonly found minority language in this region, it specifically the home of the Riograndenser Hunsrückisch German dialect, being part of the Moselle Franconian dialects.

The municipality of Guarani das Missões was settled primarily by Polish immigrants, and the town still maintains its cultural and linguistic roots.

Campina das Missões is a municipality where the majority of its population has German background, however a substantial percentage of the inhabitants are descendant of Russian immigrants. and as a result, aside from Portuguese, the national language, both Russian and German are spoken locally as regional languages.

== See also ==
- Spanish missions in the Americas
