= Vivo Rio =

Vivo Rio is a concert hall located in Aterro do Flamengo, Rio de Janeiro. The site is attached to the Museu de Arte Moderna (MAM) and was opened in November 2006.

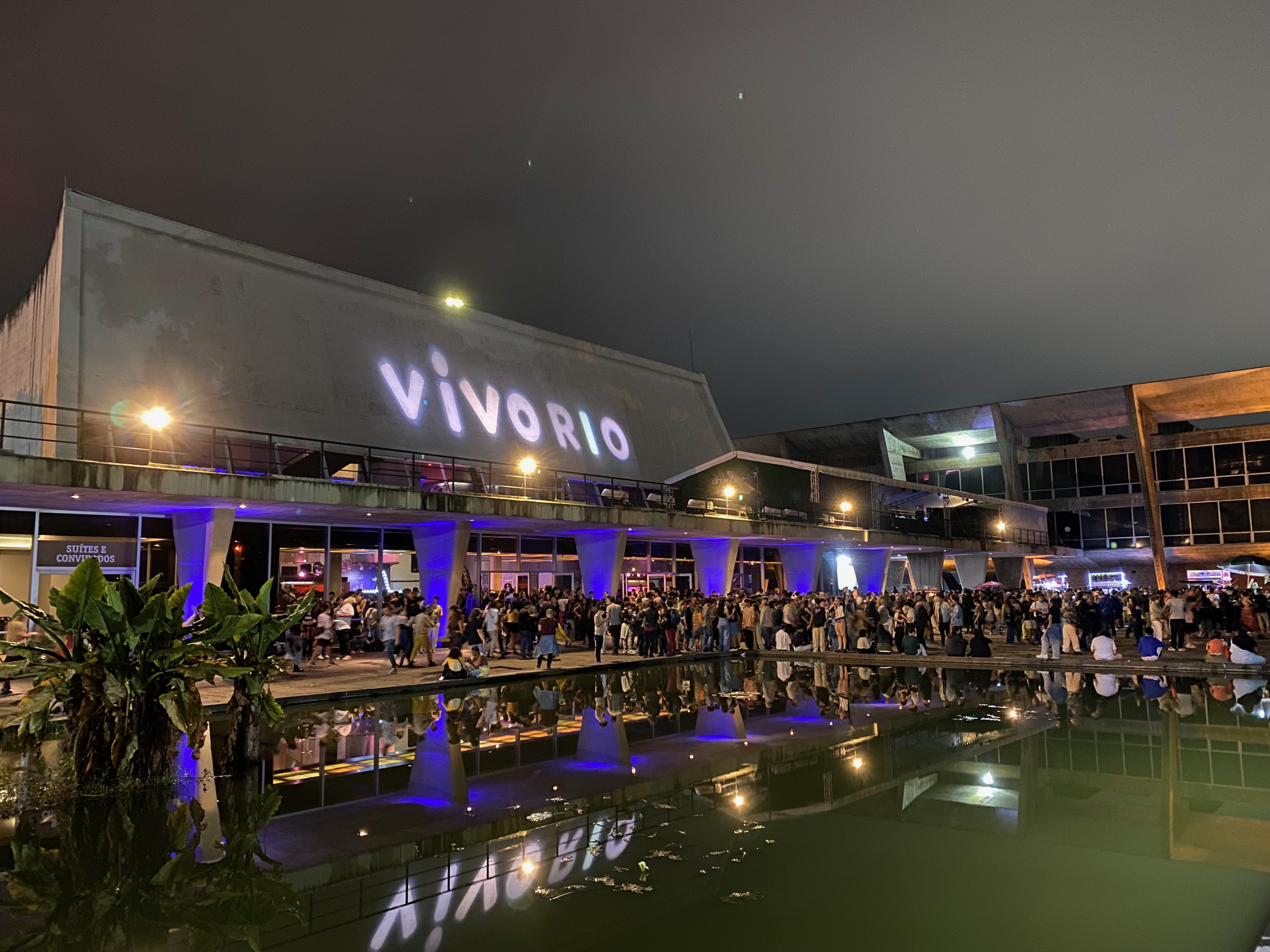
Vivo Rio in 2022.

== History ==
Vivo Rio was created in a partnership between Grupo Tom Brasil and the mobile phone Vivo. The cost of the work was estimated at R$25 million and was the conclusion of Affonso Eduardo Reidy's architectural project, in the 1950s, at the Museu de Arte Moderna in Rio de Janeiro.

The house was inaugurated on November 10, 2006, still with part of the structure to be assembled. Gilberto Gil was the first artist to perform, with the special participation of Maria Rita, Adriana Calcanhoto and Sandy & Júnior in his concert.

== Structure ==
With a capacity for 4,000 people, divided between floor area (with 3,000 m^{2}), mezzanine booths and balcony seats, the house hosts concerts of national and foreign music, theater, dance and awards parties. Near Santos Dumont Airport, Vivo Rio also offers snack bars, an American bar, with waiters for all sectors and its own parking lot. Its address is Avenida Infante Dom Henrique, number 85, in the area of Aterro do Flamengo.
