= Miss Grand Brazil 2023 =

5th Miss Grand Brazil competition, beauty pageant edition

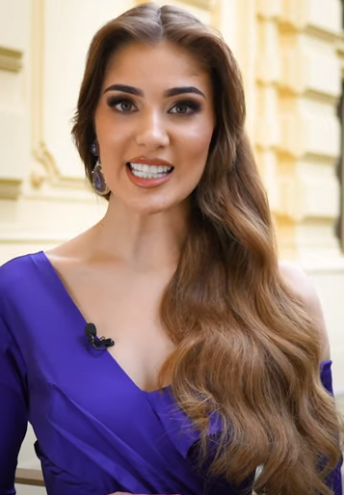
- Adriana Yanca, the winner of the contest
- Date: 10 June 2023
- Presenters: Juliano Crema; Gabrielle Vilela
- Venue: Recanto Cataratas Thermas Resort, Foz do Iguaçu, Paraná
- Broadcaster: YouTube
- Entrants: 28
- Placements: 20
- Debuts: Acre・Cataratas do Iguaçu・Guanabara・Ilha de São Luís・Ipiranga
- Withdrawals: Alto Cafezal; Cânions Paulistas; Espírito Santo; Ilha Comprida; Mato Grosso do Sul; Norte Mato-Grossense; Rondônia; Sul Mineiro; Vale do Aço
- Returns: Amazonas
- Winner: Adriana Yanca (Zona da Mata Mineira)
- Photogenic: Luciana Gomes (Tocantins)

External videos
- Miss Grand Brazil 2023 Grand final competition, on June 10, 2023, Youtube Video

Miss Grand Brazil 2023 was the 5th edition of the Miss Grand Brazil beauty pageant, originally programmed to be held on June 29, 2023, at Hotel Sibara Flat & Conventions in Balneário Camboriú, Santa Catarina, but was later rescheduled to June 10 and the venue was moved to Recanto Cataratas Thermas Resort, Foz do Iguaçu, Paraná.

Twenty-eight candidates, who were chosen through either the state pageants or national preliminary casting held directly by a central licensee, competed for the title, of whom a 26-year-old dentist, nursing technician and medical student representing Zona da Mata Mineira, Adriana Yanca, was announced the winner, while the representatives of Pernambuco, Tocantins, Paraná, and Minas Gerais, were named runners-up. Adriana was crowned by Miss Grand Brazil 2022 , Isabella Menin of Alto Cafezal, and later represented Brazil at Miss Grand International 2023 held in Vietnam on October 25, but was unplaced.

The grand final round of the pageant was hosted by Juliano Crema and Gabrielle Vilela. Meanwhile, Lorena Rodrigues who was previously crowned as Miss Grand Brazil 2021, and Henrique Fontes, Miss Grand Brazil national director, served as backstage correspondents. The event was live transmitted to an audience worldwide through its international parent contest's YouTube channel, GrandTV.

== Selection of contestants ==
=== Overview ===
Number of participants classified by representative selection methods
Method	Number (%)
A1	4 (14.29%)
A2	1 (3.57%)
B1	7 (25.00%)
B2	1 (3.57%)
C1	4 (14.29%)
C2	11 (39.29%)
A1: Miss Grand State winners A2: Other pageant main winners B1: Obtained Miss Grand as supplemental title B2: Runner-up Miss Grand State pageant C1: Appointed from other 2023 pageants C2: Appointed, no pageant held in 2023

Twenty-eight contestants took part in the pageant. As per the data collected in the regional pageants section below, thirteen of whom were directly determined through state pageants; four were the winners of the Miss Grand regional pageants (A1), including the representatives of Minas Gerais, Paraná, Rio de Janeiro, and Zona da Mata Mineira; while the representative of Piauí obtained Miss Grand title as the main award in the Miss and Mister Model Piauí pageant (A2). The remaining seven candidates obtained the Miss Grand title as a supplemental title in the Miss Brazil CNB state pageant (B1), such as the representatives of Santa Catarina, São Paulo, and Goiás.

Of the appointed candidates, the representative of Cataratas do Iguaçu was appointed to the title after finishing as the vice-miss in the Miss Grand Paraná 2023 pageant (B2), while the other four candidates, including the representative of Ilha de São Luís, Pernambuco, Plano Piloto, and Rio Grande do Sul, were appointed after obtaining the runner-up title at other state pageants (C1). The remaining eleven candidates, such as Paraíba's representative, were appointed to the position without participating in any state pageant in this particular year (C2).

One contestant, Letícia Santana, the representative of Sergipe, resigned from the title for unknown reasons and no replacement was assigned. Meanwhile, the original representative of Ipiranga, Sandy Menezes. was replaced by Brooke Shields Assunção.

Four states and insular cities made their debut in this edition, including Acre, Cataratas do Iguaçu, Guanabara, Ilha de São Luís, and Ipiranga. Compared to the previous edition, Amazonas returned, while nine states and cities withdrew, making the finalized total of twenty-eight contestants.

The information is summarized below.

Returns	Withdrawals		Debuts
Last competed in 2020: Amazonas	(São Paulo (state)) Alto Cafezal; (São Paulo (state)) Cânions Paulistas; Espírito Santo; Ilha Comprida; Mato Grosso do Sul	(Mato Grosso) Norte Mato-Grossense; Rondônia; Sergipe^{[§]}; (Minas Gerais) Sul Mineiro; (Minas Gerais) Vale do Aço	Acre
Note: ^§ Representative determined but did not compete

=== Regional pageants ===
Several Brazilian states organized Miss Grand state pageants separately to select representatives for the Miss Grand Brazil 2023 contest, such as Paraná, Minas Gerais, Sergipe; moreover, tertiary-level contests were also observed, such as Miss Grand Nova Iguaçu, with the winners representing their communities in the state-level pageants.

The following is a list of state pageants of Miss Grand Brazil 2023.

List of Miss Grand Brazil 2023 preliminary pageants, by the state coronation date
Host state	Pageant	Type	Date & Venue	Entrants	Ref.
Santa Catarina	Miss and Mister Santa Catarina CNB	B1	26 March 2022 at Centreventos Itajaí, Itajaí	32	
Pernambuco	Miss Pernambuco CNB	C1	16 April 2022 at Centro de Convenções Empresário Djalma Farias Cintra, Caruaru	15	
São Paulo	Miss and Mister São Paulo CNB	B1	18 June 2022 at Tênis Clube de Campinas, Campinas	25	
Paraná	Miss Grand Paraná^{[α]}	A1	6 September 2022 at Recanto Cataratas Thermas Resort & Convention, Foz do Iguaçu	20	
Minas Gerais	Miss Grand Zona da Mata Mineira	A1	16 October 2022 at the Barbacena Exhibition Park, Barbacena	12	
Minas Gerais	Miss Grand Minas Gerais	A1	15 November 2022 at HZ Hotel, Patos de Minas, Minas Gerais	8	
(São Paulo (state)) Ipiranga	Miss Ipiranga CNB^{[β]}	B1	3 November 2022 at the Commercial Association of São Paulo, São Paulo	15	
Ceará	Miss Ceará CNB	B1	8 December 2022 at Francisca Clotilde Theatre, Aracati	17	
Piauí	Miss and Mister Model Piauí	A2	16 December 2022 at the 309 Bar, Teresina	20	
Goiás	Miss & Mister Goiás CNB	B1	5 February 2023 at the Augustus Hotel, Goiânia	18	
Distrito Federal	Miss & Mister Brasília CNB^{[γ]}	C1	10 February 2023 at Theater Caesb, Federal District	11	
Rio Grande do Sul	Garota da Praia	C1	25 February 2023 on the Tramandaí beach, Rio Grande do Sul	63	
Mato Grosso	Miss Mato Grosso CNB	B1	4 March 2023 at the Church of the Immaculate Conception, Querência	17	
Pará	Miss Pará CNB	B1	30 March 2023 at the Maria Sylvia Nunes Theater, Belém	14	
Rio de Janeiro	Miss Grand Rio de Janeiro	A1	7 May 2023 at the Baden Powel Theater Copacabana Room, Rio de Janeiro	12	
Maranhão	Miss Maranhão CNB^{[δ]}	C1	1 July 2023 at the Arthur Azevedo Theater, São Luís	18	
Note: 1. ^α: The first runner-up of the contest, Bárbara David Vázquez, was later appointed to compete as the representative of Cataratas do Iguaçu.; 2. ^β: The title qualified for Miss Grand Brazil 2023 was Miss Grand Ilhabela.; 3. ^γ: The title qualified for Miss Grand Brazil 2023 was Miss Grand Plano Piloto.; 4. ^δ: The title qualified for Miss Grand Brazil 2023 was Miss Grand Ilha de São Luís.

== Competition ==
Miss Grand Brazil 2023 scoring procedure
Round/category	Criteria/events	Point(s)
Pre-pageant media	Video: 5 facts about me	2.50
Pre-pageant media	Video Presentation	2.50
Pre-pageant media	Magazine cover	2.50
Pre-pageant media	TV Commercial campaign	2.50
Miss Popularity	Winner^{[ε]}	1.00
Miss Popularity	2nd place	0.50
Miss Popularity	3rd place	0.25
Pageant boot camp	Discipline and behavior	2.50
Pageant boot camp	Closed-door interview	15.00
Pageant boot camp	Peace talks	15.00
Preliminary round	Evening gown round	15.00
Preliminary round	Swimsuit round	15.00
All scores mentioned above were used to determine the top 20 and top 11
Top 11 finalists	Swimsuit round	15.00
Top 11 finalists	Evening gown round	15.00
Top 11 finalists	Speech round	15.00
All scores mentioned above were used to determine the top 5
Top 5 finalists	Question and answer round	10.00
The candidate with the highest accumulated points was announced the winner

In the grand final competition held on June 10, the results of the preliminary competition—which consisted of the swimsuit and evening gown competition as well as the closed-door interview and all other pre-pageant activities—determined the top 20 and top 10 semifinalists. After the swimsuit and evening gown parade of the top 20 finalists, the final ten were announced.

In the final ten rounds, each qualified candidate delivered a speech related to the pageant campaign, Stop War and Violence. The judges then scored each candidate based on their stage performances and the speech. Together with previous scores, five candidates with the highest accumulated scores qualified for the final question and answer round, in which all of the five candidates were asked the same questions, and the judges scored them based on their answers. The candidate with the highest accumulated score, Adriana Yanca of Zona da Mata Mineira, was announced as Miss Grand Brazil 2023.

At all stages, the lowest score given by a juror was excluded to prevent biased scoring.

The judges for the preliminary and grand final rounds include:

- Ceres Sessin Ribeiro — Businessperson and godmother of the Miss Brazil CNB
- Mário Medeiros — Plastic surgeon and member of the Brazilian Society of Plastic Surgery
- Isabella Menin — Miss Grand International 2022
- Henrique Martins — Mister Brasil CNB 2023
- Lala Guedes — Miss Grand Brazil 2020
- Caroline Venturini — Miss Grand Brazil 2017
- Fábio Paula — Journalist specializing in covering beauty contests
- Eva Bitar — Film and television manager

== Result ==
=== Main placement ===
Miss Grand Brazil 2023 competition result by states/cities/etc.
Color key:
Winner	First runner-up	Second runner-up
Third runner-up	Fourth runner-up	Top 11
Top 20	Unplaced	Did not participate
Representative determined but did not compete

Position	Delegate
Miss Grand Brazil 2023	(Minas Gerais) Zona da Mata Mineira – Adriana Yanca
1st runner-up	Pernambuco – Cinthya Moura Escavadeira
2nd runner-up	Tocantins – Luciana Gomes
3rd runner-up	Paraná – Ana Finkler
4th runner-up	Minas Gerais – Júlia de Castro Rodrigues
Top 11	Ceará – Victoria Melo; Maranhão – Natália Seipel Nikolić; Pará – Yasmin Alcântara Resende; (Paraná (state)) Cataratas do Iguaçu – Bárbara David Vázquez; Rio de Janeiro – Esthefane Souza; São Paulo – Caroline Valentino
Top 20	Amazonas – Nathália Acácia da Cruz Costa; Circuito das Frutas – Carina Manzi; Goiás – Kelry Fernandes; Guanabara – Nathália Salema; Ilhabela – Bruna Sartori; Mato Grosso – Hélen Gonçalves Larocca; Plano Piloto – Rebeca Amorim; Rio Grande do Sul – Amanda Brasil Macedo; Santa Catarina – Fernanda Lupato

=== Special awards ===
Award	Delegate
Miss Photogenic	Tocantins – Luciana Gomes
Miss Congeniality	Guanabara – Nathália Salema
Miss Popularity^{[ε]}	Pará – Yasmin Alcântara Resende
Best in Swimsuit	Pernambuco - Cinthya Moura Escavadeira
Best Evening Gown	(Minas Gerais) Zona da Mata Mineira – Adriana Yanca

Note

- ^ε The winner of Miss Popularity automatically qualifies for the top 11 finalists.

== Candidates ==
28 delegates competed for the title.

State/Region	Contestant	Age (Note: Ages at the time of the pageant)	Hometown
Acre	Sarah Cristinny	19	Rio Branco
Amazonas	Nathália Acácia da Cruz Costa	22	Manaus
Bahia	Kalline Zins	24	Salvador
(Paraná (state)) Cataratas do Iguaçu	Bárbara David Vázquez	22	Foz do Iguaçu
Ceará	Victoria Melo	24	Redenção
Circuito das Frutas	Carina Manzi	27	São José dos Campos
Distrito Federal	Carol Tibery	28	Taguatinga
Goiás	Kelry Fernandes	22	Goiânia
Guanabara	Nathália Salema	21	Jacarepaguá
Ilhabela	Bruna Sartori	25	Rio Claro
Ilha de São Luís	Roberta Carvalho	24	São Luís Island
Ipiranga	Brooke Shields Assunção	20	Amazonas
Maranhão	Natália Seipel Nikolić	24	São José de Ribamar
Mato Grosso	Hélen Gonçalves Larocca	20	Alta Floresta
Minas Gerais	Júlia de Castro Rodrigues	24	Divinópolis
Pará	Yasmin Alcântara Resende	19	Ulianópolis
Paraíba	Elen Guedes	23	Campina Grande
Paraná	Ana Finkler	26	Cascavel
Pernambuco	Cinthya Moura	23	Recife
Piauí	Maria Veloso	22	Floriano
Plano Piloto	Rebeca Amorim	22	Brasília
Rio de Janeiro	Esthefane Souza	27	Rio de Janeiro
Rio Grande do Norte	Suan Magnone	21	Natal
Rio Grande do Sul	Amanda Bernardo Brasil Macedo	19	Bento Gonçalves
Santa Catarina	Fernanda Lupato	24	Tangará
São Paulo	Caroline Valentino	27	Sorocaba
Tocantins	Luciana Gomes	28	Palmas
(Minas Gerais) Zona da Mata Mineira	Adriana Yanca	26	Belford Roxo
