= Miss Grand Brazil 2019 =

2nd Miss Grand Brazil competition, beauty pageant edition

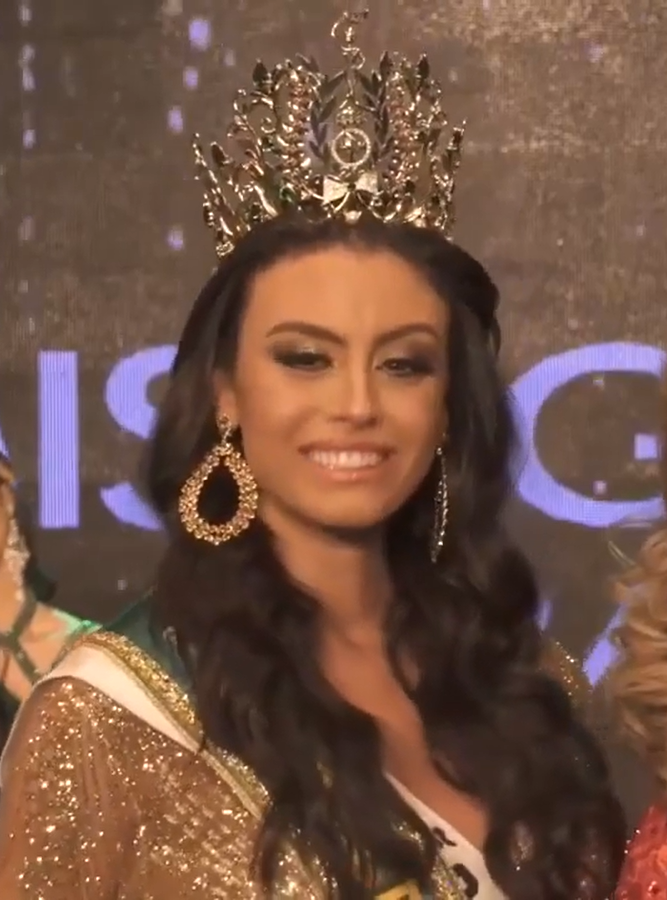
- Marjorie Marcelle of São Paulo, the winner of the contest
- Date: February 28, 2019
- Presenters: Sancler Frantz; Beatrice Fontoura
- Venue: Dall'Onder Grande Hotel, Bento Gonçalves, Rio Grande do Sul
- Broadcaster: Cartão de Visita; Facebook
- Entrants: 22
- Placements: 15
- Debuts: Alagoas; Amazonas; Ceará; Maranhão; Paraíba; Pernambuco; Rondônia; Sergipe
- Withdrawals: Olímpia
- Winner: Marjorie Marcelle (São Paulo)
- Photogenic: Isabelle Pandini (Rio de Janeiro)

External videos
- Miss Grand Brazil 2019 Grand Final Competition, on February 28, 2019, Video on Internet Archive

Miss Grand Brazil 2019 was the second edition of the Miss Grand Brazil beauty pageant, held on February 28, 2019, at the Dall'Onder Grande Hotel in Bento Gonçalves, Rio Grande do Sul. Twenty-two contestants, who qualified for the national stage through state contests held by the Concurso Nacional de Beleza (CNB Brazil), competed for the title, of whom a nutrition student and model resident of Mooca representing the state of São Paulo, Marjorie Marcelle, was elected the winner. She later represented Brazil at the Miss Grand International 2019 contest held that year on October 25 in Venezuela, and was named the fourth runner-up.

The contest was showcased under the direction of Henrique and Marina Fusquine Fontes, presidents of the CNB Brazil, who have owned the Miss Grand Brazil license since 2015. The tournament's grand gala final was broadcast via Cartão de Visita, which is part of the news portal R7, one of the three most accessed in the country, as well as on the official Facebook page of its parent platform, Miss Grand International.

The event was hosted by Sancler Frantz, Miss Brazil World 2013, and Beatrice Fontoura, Miss Brazil World 2016. Miss Grand International 2018 from Paraguay Clara Sosa, and the president of Miss Grand International Nawat Itsaragrisil, attended the competition since the pageant boot camp on February 26. The mayor of Bento Gonçalves Guilherme Pasin was present in the final event with the first lady, Cynthia Pasin, as well as the Secretary of Tourism of Bento Gonçalves, Rodrigo Ferri Parisotto.

== Competition ==
In the grand final competition held on February 28, the results of the preliminary competition—which consisted of the swimsuit and evening gown competition and the closed-door interview—determined the 15 semifinalists. The top 15 competed in the swimsuit round and were narrowed down to the top 12, who then competed in the evening gown round and were further cut down to the last nine finalists. The nine qualified candidates delivered a speech related to the pageant campaign, "Stop wars and violence," which determined the last five semifinalists, who then competed in the question and answer portion. After this, Miss Grand Brazil 2019 and her four runners-up were announced.

== Result ==
=== Main placement ===
Position	Delegate
Miss Grand Brazil 2019	São Paulo – Marjorie Marcelle
1st runner-up	Maranhão - Amanda Brenner
2nd runner-up	Minas Gerais - Lorraine Rodrigues^{[α]}
3rd runner-up	Rio de Janeiro - Isabelle Pandini
4th runner-up	Espírito Santo - Amanda Cardoso
Top 9	Ceará - Yasmin Martins; Pernambuco- Slovenia Marques; Rio Grande do Sul - Vanessa Salva; Santa Catarina - Thylara Brenner
Top 12	Alagoas - Gabriela Ribeiro; Pará - Thalita Maués; Paraná- Polyana Rosa
Top 15	Mato Grosso do Sul - Luciana Novais; Paraíba - Jéssica Costa; Sergipe - Gabriela Santana

=== Special awards ===
Award	Delegate
Miss Photogenic	Rio de Janeiro - Isabelle Pandini
Miss Popularity	Minas Gerais - Lorena Rodrigues^{[α]}
Miss Cordialidad Dall'Onder	Espírito Santo - Amanda Cardoso
Best Body	São Paulo - Marjorie Marcelle
Best Evening Gown	Minas Gerais - Lorena Rodrigues
Best Social Network	Paraná - Poliana Rosa
Best Hair	Amazonas - Fabielle Pereira

Note

- ^α Automatically qualified for the top 15 finalists after winning the fast tack, Miss Popularity.

== Contestants ==
Twenty-two contestants competed for the title of Miss Grand Brazil 2019.

- Alagoas – Gabriela Ribeiro
- Amazonas – Fabielle Pereira
- Bahia – Luiza Braz
- Ceará – Yasmin Martins
- Distrito Federal – Laís Barros
- Espírito Santo – Amanda Cardoso
- Goiás – Claudianne Vacarezza
- Maranhão – Amanda Brenner
- Mato Grosso – Thaisa Cristina Boeno
- Mato Grosso do Sul – Mato Grosso do Sul
- Minas Gerais – Lorena Rodrigues
- Pará – Thalita Maués
- Paraíba – Jéssica Costa
- Paraná – Poliana Rosa
- Pernambuco – Eslovênia Marques
- Rio de Janeiro – Isabelle Pandini
- Rio Grande do Sul – Vanessa Salva
- Rondônia – Gisele Cristina
- Santa Catarina – Thylara Brenner
- São Paulo – Marjorie Marcelle
- Sergipe – Gabriela Santana
- Tocantins – Monique Freitas
