= Miss Grand Brazil 2014 =

1st Miss Grand Brazil competition, beauty pageant edition

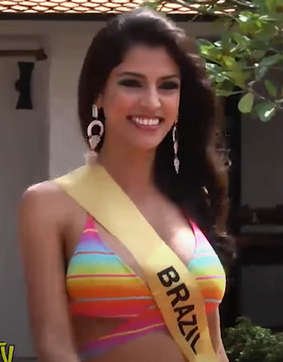
- Yameme Ibrahim of Paraná, the winner of the contest
- Date: 25 July 2014
- Presenters: Vinicius Scarano; Marcella Marques
- Entertainment: Grupo Olimpiense de Danças Parafolclóricas "Cidade Menina Moça" (GODAP)
- Venue: Anfiteatro da Casa de Cultura, Olímpia, São Paulo
- Entrants: 13
- Placements: 8
- Debuts: Bahia; Federal District; Espírito Santo; Goiás; Mato Grosso; Mato Grosso do Sul; Minas Gerais; Olímpia; Pará; Paraná; Rio de Janeiro; Rio Grande do Sul; Santa Catarina; São Paulo; Tocantins
- Winner: Yameme Ibrahim (Paraná)
- Photogenic: Naiara Thomé (São Paulo)

Miss Grand Brazil 2014 was the first edition of the Miss Grand Brazil beauty pageant, held at the Anfiteatro da Casa de Cultura in Olímpia, São Paulo on July 25, 2014. Fourteen candidates competed for the title, of whom the representative of Paraná, Yameme Ibrahim, was named the winner. She then represented Brazil on the parent stage, Miss Grand International 2014, held on November 1, 2014, in Bangkok, Thailand, where she was placed among the top 20 finalists.

The event featured a traditional performance of the Olímpiense Group of Parafolkloric Dances (Portuguese: Grupo Olímpiense de Danças Parafolclóricas; GODAP), and was supported by the Municipality of Olímpia, the Municipal Secretariat of Culture, Sport, Tourism, and Leisure led by Gustavo Zanette, as well as Miss Teen Brasil director, Gerson Antonelli, who also served as the Miss Grand Brazil licensee that year.

== Background ==
In early 2014, after Gerson Antonelli took over the franchise of the Miss Grand Brazil contest from the organization chaired by Henrique Fontes, Concurso Nacional de Beleza (CNB Brazil), he collaborated with the Olímpia City Council to organize the first Miss Grand Brazil contest in the city as the special event of the city's annual festival, the National Folklore Festival of Olímpia, on occasion to celebrate the 50th anniversary of the festival, and also to select the country representative for the Miss Grand International 2014 contest, which was later held in Thailand that year. The contest was held in parallel with the traditional pageant of the festival, the Concurso da Rainha do Folclore, with the winner received both titles.

The application period for the contest was technically open from June 25 to July 4, however only Olímpia residents with at least high school education were permitted to participate. The pageant's boot camp happened along with the 2014 Folklore Festival, and the grand final night, originally scheduled for July 11, was arranged on July 25.

The organizer also intended to organize an additional contest the following year to select the country representative for the Miss Grand International 2015 pageant, but lost the license to the former 2013 licensee, CNB Brazil.

== Results ==
Position	Delegate
Miss Grand Brazil 2014	Paraná – Yameme Ibrahim
1st runner-up	Rio de Janeiro – Camila Coutinho
2nd runner-up	São Paulo – Naiara Thomé
3rd runner-up	Minas Gerais – Cynthia Gomes
Top 8	Bahia – Gabriella Losacco; Distrito Federal – Ariane Franco; Goiás – Fernanda Lemes; Mato Grosso – Fabiola Abad
Special Award
Miss Photogenic	São Paulo – Naiara Thomé

== Contestants ==
Fourteen contestants competed for the title of Miss Grand Brazil 2014.

- Bahia – Gabriella Losacco
- Distrito Federal – Ariane Franco
- Espírito Santo – Ingrid Franco
- Goiás – Fernanda Lemes
- Mato Grosso – Fabiola Abad
- Mato Grosso do Sul – Núbia Gouvêa (withdrew)
- Minas Gerais – Cynthia Gomes
- Olímpia – Dayane Kelly
- Pará – Dréssica Alves (withdrew)
- Paraná – Yameme Ibrahim
- Rio de Janeiro – Camila Coutinho
- Rio Grande do Sul – Séphora Costa
- Santa Catarina – Camila Bornhäusen
- São Paulo – Naiara Thomé
- Tocantins – Beatriz Libonatti
