= Isabella Menin =

Brazilian model and beauty queen (born 1996)

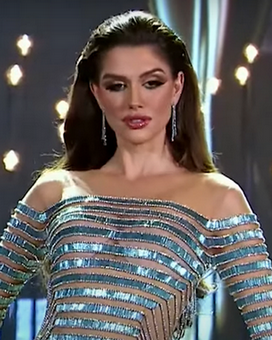
- Menin as Miss Grand International 2022
- Born: Isabella Novaes Menin; June 2, 1996 (age 30); Marília, São Paulo, Brazil
- Education: University College London
- Height: 1.80 m (5 ft 11 in)
- Beauty pageant titleholder
- Title: Miss Teen International 2013; Miss Grand Brazil 2022; Miss Grand International 2022
- Major competitions: Miss Grand Brazil 2022; (Winner); Miss Grand International 2022; (Winner)
- Website: isamenin.com

Isabella Novaes Menin (born June 2, 1996) is a Brazilian model and beauty queen who was crowned Miss Grand International 2022. She is the first Brazilian woman to win the Miss Grand International pageant.

== Early life and education ==
Isabella Menin is of Brazilian and Italian descent, and was born into a family of businesspeople in Marília, a city in the midwestern region of the state of São Paulo. Her mother, Adriana Novaes, is a former Miss Marília winner and a candidate in many international contests. She is also the great-granddaughter of businessman, Lazaro Ramos Novaes, and granddaughter of Alfredo Novaes, two of the biggest names in the early industrialization of Marília.

During 2015 – 2016, she studied business and managerial economics program at a sixth form private school, David Game College, graduated first-class honors in a bachelor's degree in economics from University of Westminster in early 2019 and earned a master's degree in Finance from University College London in 2020. Before entering Miss Grand Brazil pageant in 2022, she worked as an international model and a paraplanner for Thomson Tyndall, a financial planning and investment management private firm in the United Kingdom.

Isabella also established a charitable organization named "Beyond Project", which supports associations for people with disabilities in Brazil.

== Pageantry ==
Since she grew up in a family that was usually involved in beauty pageants, her mother, grandmother, and great-grandmother had all previously won beauty pageants; she entered a beauty pageant at the age of three with the encouragement and support of her mother and has won several mini-miss titles, including Miss Goiás, Miss Student of Marilia, Miss Teen Marilia, and Miss Teen São Paulo, as well as the international title Miss Teen International in 2013.

=== Miss Grand International 2022 ===
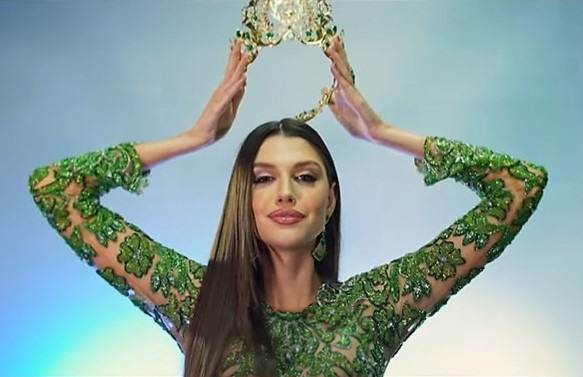
Menin as Miss Grand Brazil 2022

Menin represented Alto Cafezal at Miss Grand Brazil 2022, competed against 30 other candidates, and won the national title. She then represented the country in Miss Grand International 2022 and also won the competition, held on October 25, 2022, at Sentul International Convention Center in West Java, Indonesia, when she was crowned by outgoing titleholder Miss Grand International 2021, Nguyễn Thúc Thùy Tiên of Vietnam. She is the first titleholder from Brazil as Miss Grand International. She is also the first titleholder from Brazil to win a major international beauty pageant since Larissa Ramos that was the last Brazilian competitor who won Miss Earth 2009.

During the top ten speech round, in which all ten qualified competitors had to present a message to accompany the pageant campaign "Stop the wars and violence," Menin declared:

Do you know what is one of the most expensive problems in the world? Every five hours a child is killed. When a child is killed, part of society was also deleted. We should work together to promote education, instead of meeting each other in war. Because we humans will have different races but we have one thing in common, humanity. Let's work together and build a good foundation for our world.

The last stage was a question-answer round, with the host posing the same question to all top five finalists, "Currently there is a war between Russia and Ukraine. Russia’s president has ordered an invasion of Ukraine, killing people, destroying architecture, and create uncertainties in the future. If you have the opportunity to send a message to President Putin, what will you say in 1 minute?" Menin replied:

I would tell President Putin that they share history with Ukraine for long, long years, and also they share the most important thing – the same fate as humans. War just brings pain. We need to start thinking what you can do, even if it's a small action, to work towards diplomacy and understanding. Because together, conflict and pain can rise – but we can rise above violence and brutality.

=== Placements ===
Competition	Placement	Location	Special Awards	Represented
Miss Teen International 2013	Winner	San José, Costa Rica		Brazil
Miss Grand Brazil 2022	Winner	Brasília, Brazil		Alto Cafezal, Brazil
Miss Grand International 2022	Winner	West Java, Indonesia	Top 10 – Best in Sportswear and Swimsuit; Top 20 – Best National Costume	Brazil

Awards and achievements
Preceded by (Vietnam) Nguyễn Thúc Thùy Tiên	Miss Grand International; 2022	Succeeded by (Peru) Luciana Fuster
Preceded by Lorena Rodrigues	Miss Grand Brazil; 2022	Succeeded by Adriana Yanca
Preceded by (Puerto Rico) Valerie Hernández	Miss Teen International; 2013	Succeeded by (Paraguay) Ailin Adorno
Preceded by Rebeca Mendes	Miss Teen Brasil; 2013	Succeeded by Andressa Gomes
