= Miss Grand Brazil 2020 =

3rd Miss Grand Brazil competition, beauty pageant edition

- Date: January 30, 2020
- Presenters: Gabriel Souza
- Venue: Dall'Onder Grande Hotel, Bento Gonçalves, Rio Grande do Sul
- Broadcaster: YouTube; Facebook
- Entrants: 22
- Placements: 15
- Debuts: Rio Grande do Norte
- Withdrawals: Ceará
- Winner: Lala Guedes (Paraíba)
- Photogenic: Mariana Pinheiro (Goiás)

External videos
- Miss Grand Brazil 2020 Grand Final Competition, on January 30, 2020, Video on Internet Archive

Miss Grand Brazil 2020 was the third edition of the Miss Grand Brazil beauty pageant, held on January 30, 2020, at the Dall'Onder Grande Hotel in Bento Gonçalves, Rio Grande do Sul. Twenty-two contestants, who qualified for the national stage through state contests held by the Concurso Nacional de Beleza (CNB Brazil), competed for the title, of whom a 27-year-old medicine from Campina Grande representing the state of Paraíba, Lala Guedes, was elected the winner. She then represented Brazil at the Miss Grand International 2020 contest, previously scheduled to take place in Venezuela, held a year later on March 27, 2021, in Thailand, and was named the fourth runner-up.

The contest was showcased under the direction of Henrique and Marina Fusquine Fontes, presidents of the CNB Brazil, who have owned the Miss Grand Brazil license since 2015. The tournament's grand gala final was broadcast on the organizer's Youtube channel, TV CNB, as well as on the official Facebook page of its parent platform, Miss Grand International.

== Competition ==
In the grand final competition held on January 30, the results of the preliminary competition—which consisted of the swimsuit and evening gown competition and the closed-door interview—determined the 15 semifinalists. The top 15 competed in the swimsuit round and were narrowed down to the top 12, who then competed in the evening gown round and were further cut down to the last nine finalists. The nine qualified candidates delivered a speech related to the pageant campaign, "Stop wars and violence," which determined the last five semifinalists, who then competed in the question and answer portion. After this, Miss Grand Brazil 2019 and her four runners-up were announced.

== Result ==
=== Main placement ===
Position	Delegate
Miss Grand Brazil 2019	Paraíba – Alaise Guedes
1st runner-up	Espírito Santo – Mylena Duarte
2nd runner-up	Sergipe – Caroline Andrade
3rd runner-up	Paraná – Clarissa Thomsen
4th runner-up	Alagoas – Ruthy Rafaella
Top 9	Bahia – Juliana Santana; Goiás – Mariana David Pinheiro; Rio Grande do Norte – Yanna Gomes; São Paulo – Isadora Meira
Top 12	Distrito Federal – Maria Eduarda Estrela; Maranhão – Luciana Silva; Minas Gerais – Luísa Rocha
Top 15	Amazonas – Luisa Eliza Fonteles; Mato Grosso do Sul – Amanda Andrade; Rio de Janeiro – Jessica Nunes^{[α]}

=== Special awards ===
Award	Delegate
Miss Photogenic	Goiás – Mariana David Pinheiro
Miss Popularity	Rio de Janeiro – Jessica Nunes^{[α]}
Best Body	Goiás – Mariana David Pinheiro
Best Evening Gown	Mato Grosso – Jéssica Dutkewicz
Best Social Network	Paraíba – Alaise Guedes
Best Hair	Paraná – Clarissa Thomsen

Note

- ^α Automatically qualified for the top 15 finalists after winning the fast tack, Miss Popularity.

== Contestants ==
Twenty-two contestants competed for the title of Miss Grand Brazil 2020.

- Acre – Fabyanna Albuquerque (withdrew)
- Alagoas – Ruthy Rafaella
- Amazonas – Luisa Eliza Fonteles
- Amapá – Carolina Rodríguez (withdrew)
- Bahia – Juliana Santana
- Distrito Federal – Maria Eduarda Estrela
- Espírito Santo – Mylena Duarte
- Goiás – Mariana David Pinheiro
- Maranhão – Luciana Silva
- Mato Grosso – Jéssica Dutkewicz
- Mato Grosso do Sul – Amanda Andrade
- Minas Gerais – Luísa Rocha
- Pará – Vivian Henriques
- Paraíba – Alaise Guedes
- Paraná – Clarissa Thomsen
- Pernambuco – Emily Chizoba
- Rio de Janeiro – Jessica Nunes
- Rio Grande do Norte – Yanna Gomes
- Rio Grande do Sul – Natália Benchimol Maggi
- Rondônia – Allyne Macêdo
- Santa Catarina – Larissa Sevegnani
- São Paulo – Isadora Meira
- Sergipe – Caroline Andrade
- Tocantins – Raiany Alves
