= Guanabara (state) =

Former state of Brazil (1960–1975)

State of Guanabara
- State of the Fourth Brazilian Republic, and the Military dictatorship in Brazil
- 1960–1975
- Flag Coat of arms

- The location of the State of Guanabara, within modern State of Rio de Janeiro
- Capital: Rio de Janeiro
- Area
  - 1975: 1,356 km^{2} (524 sq mi)
- Population
  - 1975: 4,858,000
- Government
- Governor
  - 1960 (first): José Sette Câmara Filho
  - 1971–1975 (last): Chagas Freitas
- History
  - Replacement of the Federal District of Brazil: 1960
  - Disestablished: 1975
- Contained within
  - Country: Fourth Brazilian Republic (1960–1964); Military dictatorship in Brazil (1964–1975)
Preceded by	Succeeded by
Federal District of Brazil	Rio de Janeiro

The State of Guanabara (Portuguese: Estado da Guanabara, IPA: [ɡwɐnaˈbaɾɐ]) was a state of Brazil from 1960 to 1975, which included the city of Rio de Janeiro. It was named after Guanabara Bay to the east of the state. It was created from the territory of the old Federal District when the federal capital moved from Rio de Janeiro to Brasília and a new Federal District was erected around the new capital. In 1975 the State of Guanabara was merged with the surrounding State of Rio de Janeiro, within which its territory became the Municipality of Rio de Janeiro.

== History ==
In 1834, the city of Rio de Janeiro was elevated to Imperial capital of the Empire of Brazil, and was included in the Neutral Municipality (Portuguese: Município Neutro). The surrounding Province of Rio de Janeiro (which did not include the city) had its capital city in Niterói. When Brazil became a republic in 1889, the city of Rio de Janeiro remained the national capital, and the territory of the Neutral Municipality became the Federal District (Portuguese: Distrito Federal), while the surrounding homonymous province became a state, still with Niterói as its capital.

In 1960 the Fourth Brazilian Republic moved the national capital to Brasília and a new Federal District was created for it. The old Federal District became a state, named Guanabara.

Throughout its 15-year existence, Guanabara was a unique state in many ways. Comprising only one city (albeit a large one), Guanabara was the smallest Brazilian state by land. It also had the peculiarity of being the only Brazilian state that was not divided into municipalities. There was no mayor, municipal legislature or any other municipal government institution there, as the city of Rio de Janeiro was directly administered by the state government of Guanabara. On the other hand, that also meant that the Guanabara state government had some functions that were normally assigned to municipalities elsewhere, such as regulating urban zoning, inspecting the safety of buildings, or issuing licenses for commercial venues, for example.

All the characteristics disappeared in 1975, when the military dictatorship merged the state of Guanabara into the state of Rio de Janeiro. (Legally, the merger dissolved both Guanabara and Rio de Janeiro, creating a new state, also named Rio de Janeiro.) The capital of the reconstituted state of Rio de Janeiro was changed from Niterói back to the city of Rio de Janeiro, as had been the case until 1834.

== Electoral history ==
In gubernatorial elections held on 3 October 1965, Francisco Negrão de Lima, a candidate supported by a coalition formed by PTB and PSD and a close associate of former President Juscelino Kubitschek, won the race to be the state's governor, garnering 52% of the votes cast.
