= Miss Grand Brazil 2022 =

4th Miss Grand Brazil competition, beauty pageant edition

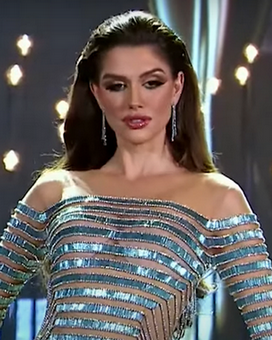
- Isabella Menin of Alto Cafezal Region, the winner of the pageant
- Date: July 28, 2022
- Presenters: Juliano Crema; Gabrielle Vilela
- Entertainment: Gabriel Souza
- Venue: Caesb Headquarters, Brasília
- Broadcaster: YouTube; Facebook
- Entrants: 31
- Placements: 16
- Debuts: Alto Cafezal; Cânions Paulistas; Circuito das Frutas; Ilhabela; Ilha Comprida; Norte Mato-Grossense; Plano Piloto; Sul Mineiro; Vale do Aço; Zona da Mata
- Withdrawals: Alagoas; Amazonas; Sergipe
- Returns: Ceará
- Winner: Isabella Menin (Alto Cafezal)
- Congeniality: Gabriela Souza (Espírito Santo)
- Photogenic: Nina Spasiani (Circuito das Frutas)

External videos
- Miss Grand Brazil 2022 Grand final competition, on July 28, 2022, Youtube Video

Miss Grand Brazil 2022 was the fourth edition of the Miss Grand Brazil beauty pageant, held on July 28, 2022, at the Caesb Headquarters in Brasília. Thirty-one contestants, who qualified for the national stage either through state contests held by the Concurso Nacional de Beleza (CNB Brazil) or being appointed, competed for the title, of whom a 26-year-old financial planner and international model from Marília representing the Alto Cafezal Region, Isabella Menin, was elected the winner. She then represented Brazil at the Miss Grand International 2022 held that year on October 25 in Indonesia, and won the first place, making her the first Brazilian representative to win the Miss Grand International title.

The pageant's entire tournament was incorporated into the program of the Brasilia Movie Festival, which was organized by the Center-West Art Center (Portuguese: Núcleo de Arte do Centro-Oeste; NACO), in collaboration with the State Secretariat of Culture and Creative Economy of the Federal District.

The contest was showcased under the direction of Henrique Fontes, president of the CNB Brazil, who has had the Miss Grand Brazil license since 2015. The grand gala of the event was televised on Miss Grand International's YouTube channel, GrandTV. Juliano Crema served as the Portuguese host, while Gabrielle Vilela, Miss Grand Brazil 2018, was the English MC.

== Competition ==
In the grand final competition held on July 28, the results of the preliminary competition—which consisted of the swimsuit and evening gown competition and the closed-door interview—determined the 16 semifinalists. The top 16 competed in the swimsuit round and were narrowed down to the top 12, who then competed in the evening gown round and were further cut down to the last nine finalists. The nine qualified candidates delivered a speech related to the pageant campaign, "Stop wars and violence," which determined the last five semifinalists, who then competed in the question and answer portion. After this, Miss Grand Brazil 2019 and her four runners-up were announced.

The panel of judges for the grand final contest includes;

- Patricia Godói – Lawyer and Miss Brasil Universe 1991 and Reina Sudamericana 1991
- Janaína Dias – Businessperson and owner of Janaína Dias Ateliê de Flores
- Fábio Paula – Journalist of Folha de S.Paulo
- Guilhermina Montarroyos – Reina Hispanoamericana Brazil 2022
- João Ricardo Dias – Miss Brazil CNB blogger
- Janssen Machado – Director of La Renovence Groups
- Caroline Teixeira – Miss Brazil CNB 2021
- Flávia Cavalcante – Journalist, presenter, and Miss Universe Brazil 1989
- Lorena Rodrigues – Journalist, model, and Miss Grand Brasil 2021

== Result ==
=== Main placement ===
Miss Grand Brazil 2022 competition result by states/cities/etc.
Color key:
Winner	First runner-up	Second runner-up
Third runner-up	Fourth runner-up	Top 9
Top 12	Top 16	Unplaced
Did not participate

Position	Delegate
Miss Grand Brazil 2022	Alto Cafezal – Isabella Menin
1st runner-up	Paraná – Gabriela Borges
2nd runner-up	Rio Grande do Sul – Vitória Brodt
3rd runner-up	(Mato Grosso) Norte Mato-Grossense – Bárbara Reis
4th runner-up	Mato Grosso – Maythe Varzoni
Top 9	Bahia – Tainara Santos; Goiás – Taynnara Gimenez; Santa Catarina – Sthefany Aragão; São Paulo – Larissa Galvão
Top 12	Maranhão – Thaís Fischer; Pará – Shanti Devi; (Minas Gerais) Vale do Aço – Víviane Lópes
Top 16	Distrito Federal – Rosa Carvalho; Mato Grosso do Sul – Bia Martins; Minas Gerais – Malu Camargos; Rio Grande do Norte – Cristianne Medeiros

=== Special awards ===
Award	Delegate
Miss Photogenic	(São Paulo (state)) Circuito das Frutas – Nina Spasiani
Miss Congeniality	Espírito Santo – Gabriela Souza
Miss Popularity	Goiás – Taynnara Gimenez^{[α]}
Miss La Renovence	Bahia – Tainara Santos^{[α]}
Best in Swimsuit	(Mato Grosso) Norte Mato-Grossense – Bárbara Reis

Note

- ^α Automatically qualified for the top 16 finalists after winning the fast tacks, Miss Popularity, or La Renovence challenge.

== Contestants ==
Thirty-one contestants competed for the title of Miss Grand Brazil 2022.

- Alto Cafezal – Isabella Menin
- Bahia – Tainara Santos
- Cânions Paulistas – Stephanie Pavani
- Ceará – Isadora Katlen
- (São Paulo (state)) Circuito das Frutas – Nina Spasiani
- Distrito Federal – Rosa Carvalho
- Espírito Santo – Gabriela Souza
- Goiás – Taynnara Gimenez
- Ilhabela – Bruna Bonomo
- Ilha Comprida – Nicole Hadassa
- Maranhão – Thaís Fischer
- Mato Grosso – Maythe Varzoni
- Mato Grosso do Sul – Bia Martins
- Minas Gerais – Malu Camargos
- (Mato Grosso) Norte Mato-Grossense – Bárbara Reis
- Pará – Shanti Devi
- Paraíba – Chaene Guedes
- Paraná – Gabriela Borges
- Pernambuco – Julia Ohanna
- Piauí – Ana Paula Souza
- (Federal District (Brazil)) Plano Piloto – Mohaly França
- Rio de Janeiro – Keila Campbell
- Rio Grande do Norte – Cristianne Medeiros
- Rio Grande do Sul – Vitória Brodt
- Rondônia – Vitória Ribeiro
- Santa Catarina – Sthefany Aragão
- São Paulo – Larissa Galvão
- (Minas Gerais) Sul Mineiro – Sara Santos
- Tocantins – Khalynne Silva
- (Minas Gerais) Vale do Aço – Víviane Lópes
- (Minas Gerais) Zona da Mata Mineira – Maria Azevedo
