= Miss Brazil World =

Ann Miss World Beauty contest

- Formation: 1958
- Type: Beauty pageant
- Headquarters: Rio de Janeiro
- Location: Brazil
- Members: Miss World; Miss Supranational; Miss Grand International; Miss Charm International; Miss United Continents; Miss Eco International; Reina Hispanoamericana; Reinado del Café; Reinado de la Ganadería
- Official language: Portuguese
- President: Henrique Fontes
- Website: CNB

Miss Brazil World (Portuguese: Miss Brasil Mundo) is an annual national beauty pageant that selects Brazil's official representative to Miss World.

The Brazilian representatives began to be sent from the year 1958, with girl from Pernambuco Sônia Maria Campos. Since 2006 who manages the sending of representatives to the international event is the team led by Henrique Fontes (Global Beauties Website director). The country has so far only an international crown, obtained with the medicine student Lúcia Petterle in 1971.

== Organization ==
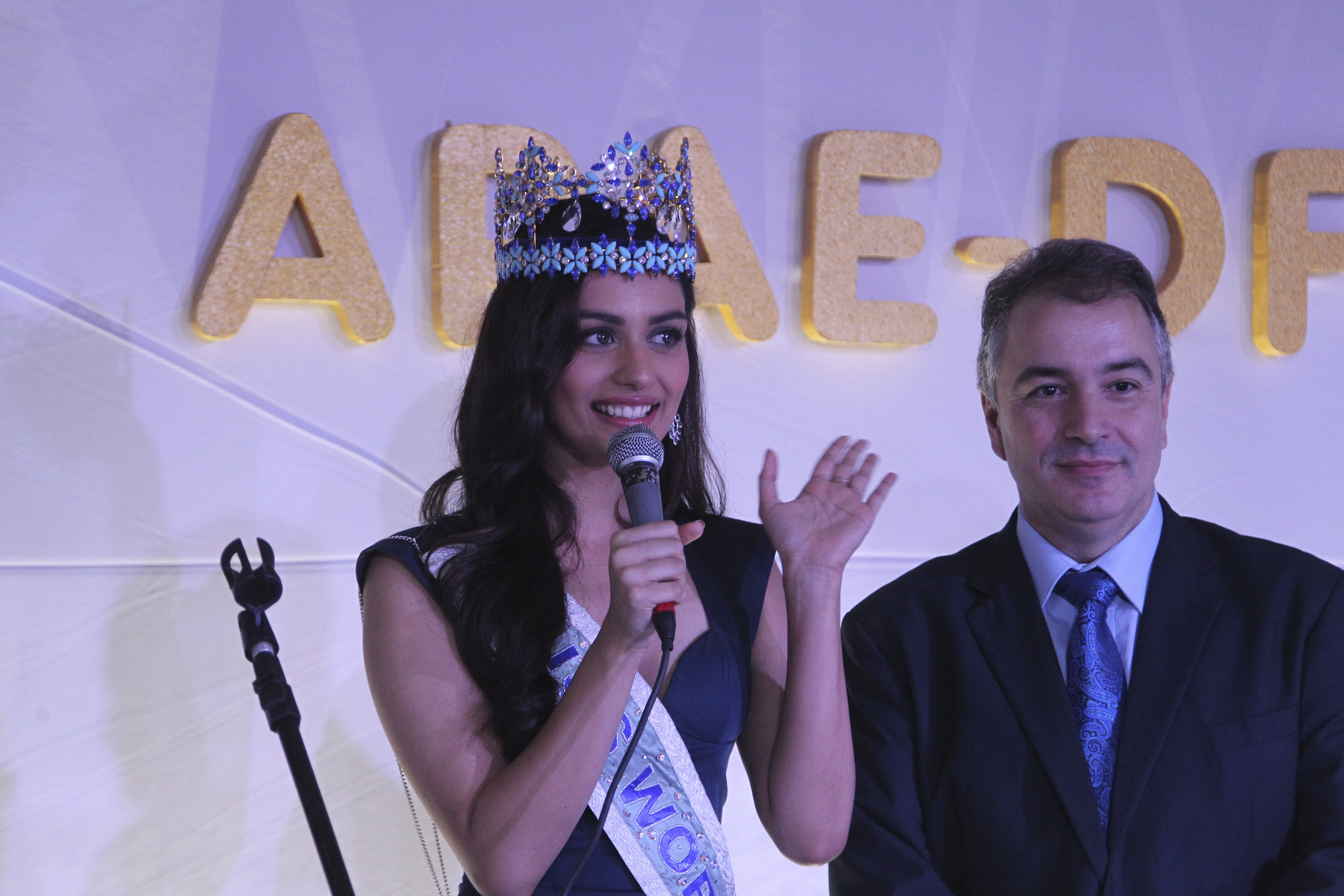
Henrique Fontes with Miss World 2017, Manushi Chhillar, in Brasília.

The event excels in originality and social responsibility, having been the first large national beauty contest to include in its official activities evidence of talent, sports and fashion, in addition to encouraging the practice of philanthropic actions (following its motto, Beauty with a Purpose). All of this, not to mention the privilege and responsibility of representing Brazil - all its culture and biodiversity - at Miss World, which is currently considered the main beauty contest on the planet, since it was the pioneer worldwide, having its first edition held in 1951.

Since taking on the coordination of the contest in 2006, Henrique Fontes has been trying to reposition the image of the Brazilian stage with a Miss World organization by bringing the winners of the competitions to honor the event. The visit of the British Julia Morley, CEO of the international dispute in 2013 to watch and closely monitor the election of the most beautiful Brazilian, consolidating the work of Fontes ahead of the organization for more than ten years. Among the holders of the Miss World title who have already been present in the national, the following stand out: Unnur Birna, Icelandic elected Miss World 2005, came to Brazil to honor the election of Jane Borges in the highly disputed competition of Miss Mundo Brasil 2006; Seven years after the arrival of Unnur, it was the turn of the Chinese Yu Wenxia to participate in the election of the most beautiful Brazilian of 2013 who crowned the gaucho Sancler Frantz as the winner; The third and last time that a Miss World stepped on Brazilian soil was the Indian Manushi Chhillar in 2018 as part of her tour of "Beauty with a Purpose" Chhlar visited several cities in the country such as the capital Brasília.

== Titleholders ==
=== Miss Brazil for Miss World ===
Note: The current franchise owner started the competition on 2006.

Color key

- Declared as Winner
- Ended as runner-up
- Ended as one of the finalists or semifinalists

Host/Year	Participation	Contestant	Represented	Placement	Special Awards
2026	64	Gabriela Botelho	Sergipe	Top 12	Queen of Americas
2025	63	Jéssica Pedroso	São Paulo	Top 08	Queen of Americas
2023	62	Letícia Frota	Amazonas	Top 08	Queen of Americas & BWP Winner
2022	Miss World 2021 was rescheduled to 16 March 2022 due to the COVID-19 pandemic outbreak in Puerto Rico, no edition started in 2022				
2021	61	Caroline Teixeira	Distrito Federal	Top 40	
2020	Due to the impact of COVID-19 pandemic, no pageant in 2020.				
2019	60	Elis Miele	Espírito Santo	Top 05	Queen of Americas
2018	59	Jéssica Carvalho	Piauí		
2017	58	Gabrielle Vilela	Rio de Janeiro	Top 40	
2016	57	Beatrice Fontoura	Goiás	Top 11	
2015	56	Catharina Choi	Ilhabela	Top 20	Queen of Americas
2014	55	Júlia Gama	Rio Grande do Sul	Top 11	Beauty with a Purpose Winner
2013	54	Sancler Frantz	Ilha dos Lobos	Top 06	Queen of Americas & Beach Fashion
2012	53	Mariana Notarângelo	Rio de Janeiro	Top 07	Queen of Americas
2011	52	Juceila Bueno	Rio Grande do Sul	Top 31	
2010	51	Kamilla Salgado	Pará		
2009	50	Luciana Reis	Roraima	Top 16	
2008	49	Tamara Almeida	Minas Gerais	Top 15	
2007	48	Regiane Andrade	Santa Catarina		
2006	47	Jane Borges	Goiânia	Top 06	Queen of Americas
2005	46	Patrícia Reginato	Paraná		
2004	45	Iara Coelho	Minas Gerais		
2003	44	Lara Brito	Goiás		
2002	43	Taíza Thomsen	Santa Catarina		
2001	42	Joyce Aguiar	São Paulo		
2000	41	Francine Eickemberg	Santa Catarina		
1999	40	Paula Carvalho	Rio de Janeiro		
1998	39	Adriana Reis	Rondônia	Top 10	Miss Photogenic
1997	38	Fernanda Agnes	Rio Grande do Sul		
1996	37	Anuska Prado	Espírito Santo	2nd runner-up	Most Spectacular National Dress
1995	36	Elessandra Dartora	Paraná		
1994	35	Valquíria Melnik	Paraná		
1993	34	Lyliá Virna	Alagoas		
1992	33	Priscila Furlan	São Paulo		
1991	32	Cátia Kupssinskü	Rio Grande do Sul		
1990	31	Karla Kwiatkowski	Paraná		
1989	Brazil did not compete.				
1988	Brazil did not compete.				
1987	30	Simone Augusto	Pernambuco		
1986	29	Roberta Pereira	Santa Catarina		
1985	28	Leila Bittencourt	Rio Grande do Sul	Top 15	
1984	27	Adriana Alves	Rio Grande do Sul	Top 07	
1983	26	Cátia Pedrosa	Rio de Janeiro	2nd runner-up	Miss Personality
1982	25	Mônica Januzzi	Paraná		
1981	24	Maristela Grazzia	São Paulo	Top 07	
1980	23	Loiane Aiache	Brasília		
1979	22	Léa Dall'Acqua	São Paulo	Top 07	
1978	21	Angélica Viana	Bahia		
1977	20	Madalena Sbaraini	Rio Grande do Sul	3rd runner-up	
1976	19	Adelaide Fraga	Brasília		
1975	18	Zaida Costa	Bahia		
1974	17	Marisa Sommer	Brasília	Top 15	
1973	16	Florence Alvarenga	Minas Gerais	Top 15	
1972	15	Ângela Favi	São Paulo		
1971	14	Lúcia Petterle	Guanabara	Miss World 1971	
1970	13	Sônia Guerra	São Paulo	Top 07	
1969	12	Cristina Rodrigues	Rio Grande do Sul		
1968	11	Ângela Stecca	Minas Gerais		
1967	10	Wilza Rainato	Paraná		
1966	9	Marluce Manvailler	Mato Grosso	3rd runner-up	
1965	8	Berenice Lunardi	Minas Gerais		
1964	7	Isabel Avelar	Sergipe	3rd runner-up	
1963	6	Vera Maia	Guanabara	Top 14	
1962	5	Vera Sabá	Guanabara		
1961	4	Alda Coutinho	Guanabara		
1960	3	Edilene Torreão	Pernambuco	Top 10	
1959	2	Dione Brito	Pernambuco		
1958	1	Sônia Campos	Pernambuco		

=== Miss Brazil for Miss Supranational ===
Note: Between 2014 and 2017, the Brazilian representatives was sent by another organization, led by Luiz Roberto Kauffmann.

Color key

- Declared as Winner
- Ended as runner-up
- Ended as one of the finalists or semifinalists

Host/Year	Participation	Contestant	City/State of Birth	Placement	Special Awards
2026	17	Lara Marina	Afonso Cláudio, ES	2nd runner-up	Supra Model Americas
2025	16	Eduarda Braum	Afonso Cláudio, ES	Miss Supranational 2025	
2024	15	Isadora Murta	Belo Horizonte, MG	3rd Runner-up	
2023	14	Sancler Frantz	Arroio do Tigre, RS	2nd runner-up	Miss Supra Influencer
2022	13	Giovanna Reis	Cascavel, PR	Top 24	
2021	12	Deise Benício	São Rafael, RN	Top 24	Queen of Americas
2020	Due to the impact of COVID-19 pandemic, no pageant in 2020.				
2019	11	Fernanda Souza	Joinville, SC		
2018	10	Bárbara Reis	Novo Repartimento, PA	Top 10	Best Model & Queen of Americas
2017	9	Thayná Lima	Brasília, DF	Top 25	
2016	8	Clóris Junges	Curitiba, PR	Top 25	
2015	7	Amanda Gomes	Jaú, SP		
2014	6	Milla Vieira	São Paulo, SP		
2013	5	Raquel Benetti	São Francisco de Paula, RS	Top 10	Queen of Americas
2012	4	Mariane Silvestre	Araraquara, SP		
2011	3	Suymara Barreto	Belém, PA	Top 20	Best National Costume
2010	2	Luciana Reis	Belo Horizonte, MG	Top 10	
2009	1	Karine Osório	Ponta Grossa, PR	Top 15	Queen of Americas

=== Miss Brazil for Miss Grand International ===
In 2014, 2024, and 2025, the representatives were chosen by different organizations. In 2019, 2020 and 2022 – 2023, the CNB separately held the pageants Miss Grand Brazil to select the country representatives for the international stage.

Color key

- Declared as Winner
- Ended as runner-up
- Ended as one of the finalists or semifinalists

Host/Year	Participation	Contestant	City/State of Birth	Placement	Special Awards
2022	10	Isabella Menin	Marília, SP	Miss Grand International 2022	
2021	9	Lorena Rodrigues	Juiz de Fora, MG	2nd runner-up	
2020	8	Lala Guedes	Campina Grande, PB	4th runner-up	Best in Swimsuit
2019	7	Marjorie Marcelle	São Paulo, SP	4th runner-up	
2018	6	Gabrielle Vilela	Angra dos Reis, RJ	Top 20	
2017	5	Caroline Venturini	Tramandaí, RS	Top 20	
2016	4	Renata Sena	Lisbon, PT		
2015	3	Paula Gomes	Campo Grande, MS	Top 10	
2014	2	Yameme Ibrahim	Criciúma, SC	Top 20	
2013	1	Tamara Bicca	Porto Alegre, RS	Top 10	

=== Miss Brazil for Miss Charm ===
Note: The international competition was supposedly scheduled to debut in 2021 with Ariely Stoczynski as the Brazilian representative. The pageant was then cancelled. The pageant is now set to debut on February 16, 2023 with Luma Russo as the Brazilian representative.

Color key

- Declared as Winner
- Ended as runner-up
- Ended as one of the finalists or semifinalists

Host/Year	Participation	Contestant	City/State of Birth	Placement	Special Awards
2025	3	Maiara Braga Porto	Nova Friburgo, RJ	Top 12	
2024	2	Thaís Cristina Jagelski	Pérola d'Oeste, PR	Unplaced	
2023	1	Luma Russo Moura	Divinópolis, MG	Miss Charm 2023	

=== Miss Brazil for Miss United Continents ===
Note: Before 2013, Miss United Continents was Miss Continente Americano, a continental pageant.

Color key

- Declared as Winner
- Ended as runner-up
- Ended as one of the finalists or semifinalists

Host/Year	Participation	Contestant	City/State of Birth	Placement	Special Awards
2022	8	Larissa Barros	São Paulo, SP	Top 10	
2021	Due to the impact of COVID-19 pandemic, no pageant in this period.				
2020	Due to the impact of COVID-19 pandemic, no pageant in this period.				
2019	7	Thylara Brenner	Itajaí, SC		
2018	6	Gleycy Correia	Macaé, RJ		
2017	5	Emanuelle Costa	Belém, PA		
2016	4	Taynara Gargantini	Paranavaí, PR	3rd runner-up	
2015	3	Nathália Lago	Castanhal, PA	Miss United Continents	
2014	2	Camila Nantes	Campo Grande, MS	Top 10	
2013	1	Thainara Latenik	Herval d'Oeste, SC		

=== Miss Brazil for Reina Hispanoamericana ===
Note: Before 2007, Reina Hispanoamericana was Miss Sudamericana, a continental pageant.

Color key

- Declared as Winner
- Ended as runner-up
- Ended as one of the finalists or semifinalists

Host/Year	Participation	Contestant	City/State of Birth	Placement	Special Awards
2026	17	Cássia Adriane	Belém, PA		
2025	16	Júlia Castro	Divinópolis, MG	5th Runner-up	
2023	15	Cinthya Moura	Recife, PE	2nd Runner-up	Miss Piel Radiante Solaris
2022	14	Guilhermina Montarroyos	Moreno, PE	2nd Runner-up	5 Awards
2021	13	Bruna Zanardo	Laranjal Paulista, SP	5th Runner-up	Best Body, Chica Amazonas & ENSC
2020	Due to the impact of COVID-19 pandemic, no pageant in 2020.				
2019	12	Gabrielle Vilela	Angra dos Reis, RJ	1st runner-up	Top 3 Best Body
2018	11	Isabele Pandini	São José do Rio Preto, SP	1st runner-up	Chica Amazonas & Miss Patra Sports
2017	10	Laís Berté	Garibaldi, RS	2nd runner-up	
2016	9	Mayra Dias	Itacoatiara, AM	2nd runner-up	Miss Personality
2015	8	Larissa Dienstmann	Campo Grande, MS		
2014	7	Raquel Benetti	São Francisco de Paula, RS	7th runner-up	
2013	6	Kimberly Maciel	Videira, SC		
2012	5	Jeanine Castro	Sete Lagoas, MG	4th runner-up	
2011	Tamara Almeida fainte for diabetes during the preliminaries. She withdrew.				
2010	4	Suymara Barreto	Belém, PA	3rd runner-up	
2009	3	Lívia Nepomuceno	Brasília, DF	2nd runner-up	Chica Aerosur
2008	2	Vivian Noronha	Umuarama, PR	Reina Hispanoamericana	Best Figure
2007	1	Jane Borges	Goiânia, GO	1st runner-up	Best Smile

=== Miss Brazil for Reinado Internacional del Café ===
Note: Before 2007, another organization was responsible for sending the Brazilian representatives.

Color key

- Declared as Winner
- Ended as runner-up
- Ended as one of the finalists or semifinalists

Host/Year	Participation	Contestant	City/State of Birth	Placement	Special Awards
2026	41	Lorena Ohana	Caruaru, PE	1st runner-up	Best Face
2025	40	Cristiane Stipp	Querência, MT	Reina Internacional del Café	
2024	39	Luciana Gomes	Porto Nacional, TO	Top 10	
2023	38	Gabrielle Araújo	Ibirité, MG		
2022	37	Eduarda Valotto	Cianorte, PR	1st runner-up	
2021	Due to the impact of COVID-19 pandemic, no pageant in 2021.				
2020	36	Bianca Loyolla	Linhares, ES		
2019	35	Inessa Pontes	Limoeiro do Norte, CE	4th runner-up	Best Face
2018	34	Anna Lyssa Valim	Brasília, DF		Best Face
2017	33	Francielly Ouriques	São José, SC	3rd runner-up	Best Hair & Best Legs
2016	32	Júlia Horta	Juiz de Fora, MG	1st runner-up	
2015	31	Vitória Bisognin	Santa Maria, RS	3rd runner-up	Best Hair
2014	30	Priscilla Durand	Campina Grande, PB	Reina Internacional del Café	Best Legs
2013	29	Andressa Mello	Ijuí, RS		Queen of Police
2012	28	Aline Reis	Belém, PA	4th runner-up	
2011	27	Isabelle Sampaio	Recife, PE		
2010	26	Mariana Notarângelo	Duque de Caxias, RJ	Reina Internacional del Café	Queen of Police
2009	25	Anelize Garcia	Maringá, PR		
2008	24	Loraine Gimenez	Salvador, BA		
2007	23	Clarissa Caetano	São José dos Pinhais, PR		

=== Miss Brazil for Reinado Internacional de la Ganadería ===
Note: The international competition started on 2008.

Color key

- Declared as Winner
- Ended as runner-up
- Ended as one of the finalists or semifinalists

Host/Year	Participation	Contestant	City/State of Birth	Placement	Special Awards
2026	-	Jamilly Campos	Estância, SE	Did not compete	
2025	14	Thaís Zanatta	Guaraniaçu, PR	Reina Int. de la Ganadería	Best Body
2024	13	Jamille Baretta	Alta Floresta, MT	Reina Int. de la Ganadería	Best Body
2023	12	Maíza Santa Rita	Brasília, DF		
2022	Due to the impact of COVID-19 pandemic, no pageant in 2020, 2021 and 2022.				
2021	Due to the impact of COVID-19 pandemic, no pageant in 2020, 2021 and 2022.				
2020	Due to the impact of COVID-19 pandemic, no pageant in 2020, 2021 and 2022.				
2019	11	Joanna Camargo	Soledade, RS	Reina Int. de la Ganadería	Best Hair
2018	10	Amanda Brenner	Santa Maria, RS	1st runner-up	Queen of Police
2017	9	Kelly Sendy	Várzea Grande, MT		Queen of Police
2016	-	Jaqueline Verrel	Palmas, TO	Did not compete	
2015	8	Elisa Freitas	Florianópolis, SC		Best: Face, Body and in Fandango
2014	7	Taynara Gargantini	Paranavaí, PR	Reina Int. de la Ganadería	
2013	6	Gabrielle Vilela	Angra dos Reis, RJ	Reina Int. de la Ganadería	
2012	5	Nataly Uchôa	Macapá, AP		
2011	4	Marina Fagundes	São José, SC		
2010	3	Cristiane Kampa	São José dos Pinhais, PR	2nd runner-up	
2009	2	Samara Valêncio	Cuiabá, MT		
2008	1	Cissa Stolariki	Jaboticabal, SP	1st runner-up	
