= List of films about the Naxalite–Maoist insurgency =

Below is an incomplete list of feature films, television films or television series which include events of the Naxalite–Maoist insurgency. This list does not include documentaries, short films.

== 1970s ==
Year	Country	Main title (Alternative title)	Original title (Original script)	Director	Subject
1970	India	You made me a communist	കമ്മ്യൂണിസ്റ്റാക്കി	Thoppil Bhasi	Based on the play Ningalenne Communistakki.
1970	India	The Adversary, Siddharta and the City	প্রতিদ্বন্দ্বী	Satyajit Ray	Drama. Based on the novel Pratidwandi.
1971	India	Company Limited	সীমাবদ্ধ	Satyajit Ray	Drama. Based on the novel Seemabaddha.
1975	India	When the River Kabani Turned Red	കബനീനദി ചുവന്നപ്പോൾ	P. A. Backer	Arikkad Varghese

== 1980s ==
Year	Country	Main title (Alternative title)	Original title (Original script)	Director	Subject
1980	India	The Naxalites	द नक्सेलाइटस	Khwaja Ahmad Abbas	Drama.
1981	India	Red Jasmines	ఎర్రమల్లెలు	Dhavala Satyam	Drama.
1983	India	Colourful Dreams	రంగులకల	B. Narsing Rao	Drama.
1984	India	Dead End	अंधी गली	Buddhadeb Dasgupta	Drama, Thriller. Based on the story Ghar Bari.
1986	India	Five fires	പഞ്ചാഗ്നി	Hariharan	Crime, Drama, Romance. K. Ajitha
1988	India	Forest	ആരണ്യകം	Hariharan	Crime, Drama, Thriller.
1989	India	Scales of Justice	நியாயத் தராசு	K. Rajeshwar	

== 1990s ==
Year	Country	Main title (Alternative title)	Original title (Original script)	Director	Subject
1991	India	Afternoon	അപരാഹ്നം	M. P. Sukumaran Nair	Drama.
1993	India	Aayirappara	ആയിരപ്പറ	Venu Nagavally	Action, Comedy, Drama, History.
1993	India	Food for the Journey	പാഥേയം	Bharathan	Drama.
1993	India	Seeding	అంకురం	C. Umamaheswara Rao	Drama.
1994	India	Times of Treason	द्रोह काल	Govind Nihalani	Action, Crime, Drama, Thriller.
1994	India	Red army	ఎర్రసైన్యం	R. Narayana Murthy	Drama.
1995	India	River of Blood	குருதிப்புனல்	P. C. Sreeram	Action, Drama, Thriller.
1997	India	Aravindhan	அரவிந்தன்	T. Nagarajan	Drama. Kilvenmani massacre
1997	India	Vermilion	సింధూరం	Krishna Vamsi	Action, Drama, Romance.
1997	India	Osey Ramulamma	ఒసేయ్ రాములమ్మా	Dasari Narayana Rao	Action, Drama, Thriller.
1998	India	The Mother of 1084	हज़ार चौरासी की माँ	Govind Nihalani	Drama. Based on the novel Hajar Churashir Maa.
1999	India	Newspaper	പത്രം	Joshiy	Action, Thriller.
1999	India	Veerappa Nayaka	ವೀರಪ್ಪನಾಯ್ಕ	S. Narayan	Drama.

== 2000s ==
Year	Country	Main title (Alternative title)	Original title (Original script)	Director	Subject
2000	India	The Rite... A Passion	తిలదానం	K. N. T. Sastry	
2000	India	Naxalite	ನಕ್ಸಲೈಟ್	Shivamani	Action.
2002	India	Red Salute	लाल सलाम	Gaganvihari Borate	Action, Drama.
2003	India; France	A Thousand Wishes Like This	हज़ारों ख़्वाहिशें ऐसी	Sudhir Mishra	Drama. The Emergency (India)
2004	India	143		Puri Jagannadh	Action, Romance, Thriller.
2005	India	Tango Charlie	टैंगो चार्ली	Mani Shankar	Action, Adventure, Drama, War.
2007	India	Speak, Speak out, Jasmine	ಮಾತಾಡ್ ಮಾತಾಡು ಮಲ್ಲಿಗೆ	Nagathihalli Chandrashekhar	Drama.
2008	India	Chamku	चमकू	Kabeer Kaushik	Action, Crime, Thriller.
2008	India	Fun	జల్సా	Trivikram Srinivas	Action, Comedy.
2008	India	Turban	തലപ്പാവ്	Madhupal	Drama. Arikkad Varghese
2008	India	Informer	मुखबिर	Mani Shankar	Crime, Drama, Mystery, Thriller.
2009	India	Calcutta My Love	কালবেলা	Goutam Ghose	Drama. Based on the novel Critical Hour.
2009	India	Arrow	బాణం	Chaitanya Dantuluri	Action, Drama.
2009	India	Red Alert: The War Within	रेड अलर्ट: द वॉर विद-इन	Anant Mahadevan	Action, Drama, Thriller, War.

== 2010s ==
Year	Country	Main title (Alternative title)	Original title (Original script)	Director	Subject
2010	India	Raavan	रावण	Mani Ratnam	Action, Adventure, Drama, Romance, Thriller.
2010	India	Raavanan	ராவணன்	Mani Ratnam	Action, Adventure, Drama, Thriller.
2010	India	Swayamsiddha	ସ୍ୱୟଂସିଦ୍ଧା	Sudhanshu Sahu	Drama.
2011	India	King	கோ	K. V. Anand	Action, Musical, Thriller.
2011	India	Virodhi	విరోధి	Neelakanta	Drama.
2012	India	Wheel formation more idiomatically puzzle	चक्रव्यूह	Prakash Jha	Action, Drama, Thriller.
2012	India	Dutta Vs Dutta	দত্ত ভার্সেস দত্ত	Anjan Dutt	Drama.
2013	India	D Company	ഡി കമ്പനി	M. Padmakumar; Diphan; Vinod Vijayan	Action, Crime, Drama, Mystery, Thriller.
2013	India	Dalam	దళం	B. Jeevan Reddy	Action.
2013	India	Whats Your Religion?	तुह्या धर्म कोंचा	Satish Manwar	Action, Drama, Family.
2013	India	Cloud Capped Star	মেঘে ঢাকা তারা	Kamaleshwar Mukherjee	Biography, Drama. Ritwik Ghatak
2015	India	Naxal	নকশাল	Debaditya Bandyopadhyay	History.
2016	India	Once upon a time, there was a man	అప్పట్లో ఒకడుండేవాడు	Saagar K Chandra	Drama.
2016	India	Buddha in a Traffic Jam		Vivek Agnihotri	Crime, Thriller.
2016	India	Ricky	ರಿಕ್ಕಿ	Rishab Shetty	Romance, Thriller.
2017	India; United States	Detective Jagga	जग्गा जासूस	Anurag Basu	Adventure, Comedy, Musical, Mystery. Purulia arms drop case
2017	India	Newton	न्यूटन	Amit V. Masurkar	Comedy, Drama.
2018	India	Kaattu Vithachavar	കാറ്റ് വിതച്ചവർ	Satheesh Paul	Drama, Thriller. Rajan case, The Emergency (India)
2019	India	George Reddy	జార్జ్ రెడ్డి	B. Jeevan Reddy	Action, Biography. George Reddy
2019	India	Raktham – The Blood	రక్తం - ది బ్లడ్	Rajesh Touchriver	Action, Crime, Drama, War. Based on the play The Just Assassins.
2019	India	Bullet	ഉണ്ട	Khalid Rahman	Action, Comedy, Thriller.

== 2020s ==
Year	Country	Main title (Alternative title)	Original title (Original script)	Director	Subject
2020	India	Ayyappan and Koshy	അയ്യപ്പനും കോശിയും	Sachy	Action, Drama, Thriller.
2020	India	Friend	Yaara	Tigmanshu Dhulia	Action. Remake of the movie A Gang Story.
2020	India	Fourth River	നാലാം നദി	RK Dreamwest	Thriller.
2022	India	The book of Virata	విరాట పర్వం	Venu Udugula	Action, Drama, Romance.
2022	India	Teacher	ఆచార్య	Koratala Siva	Action, Drama.
2022	India	Many	Anek	Anubhav Sinha	Action, Drama, Sport, Thriller.
2022	India	The hill	కొండా	Ram Gopal Varma	Action, Biography, Drama. Konda Surekha, Errabelli Dayakar Rao, Konda Murali, Akkiraju Haragopal
2023	India	Home, Gun, Biryani	घर बंदूक बिरयानी	Hemant Jangal Awtade	Comedy, Drama, Thriller.
2023	India	Ambush	Ghaath	Chhatrapal Ninawe	Drama, Thriller.
2023	India	Lohardaga	लोहरदगा	Lal Vijay Shahdeo	Drama.
2024	India	Bastar: The Naxal Story		Sudipto Sen	Action, Crime, Drama. April 2010 Maoist attack in Dantewada
2024	India	Jahangir National University		Vinay Sharma	Drama.
2025	India	Operation London Cafe		Sadagara Raghavendra	Drama.

== Science fiction, fantasy, and horror films ==
Year	Country	Main title (Alternative title)	Original title (Original script)	Director	Subject
1974	India	Chorus	কোরাস	Mrinal Sen	Fantasy, Drama.
