= List of accolades received by Yuva =

Yuva awards and nominations
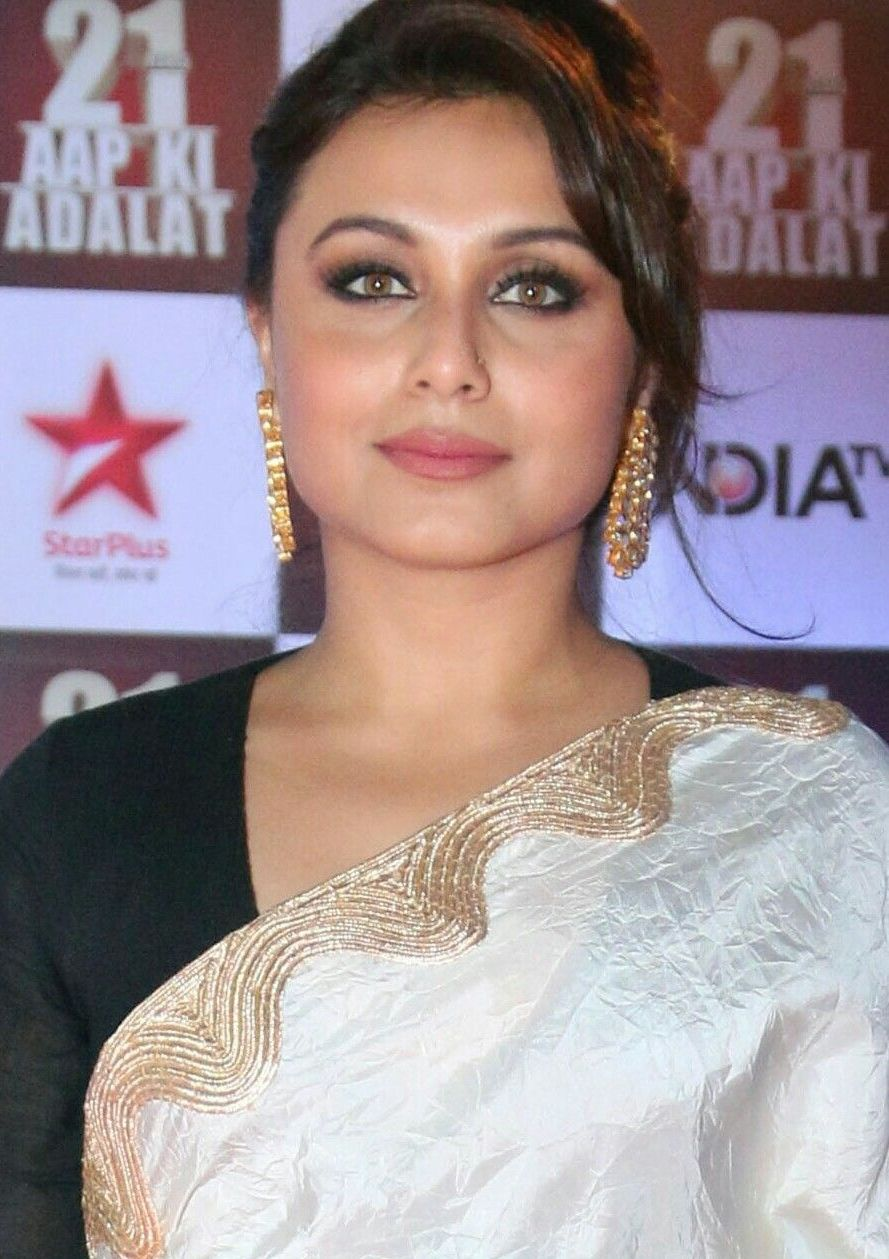
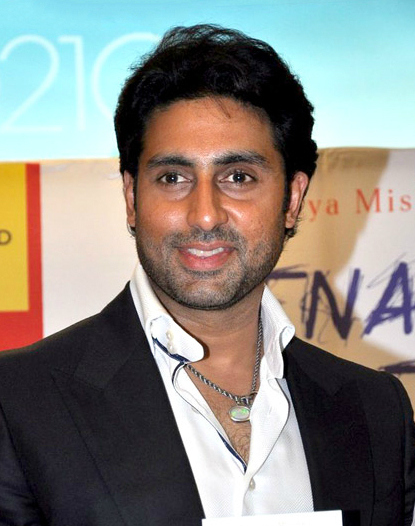
- Rani Mukerji and Abhishek Bachchan garnered several accolades for their performance in Yuva.
Awards and nominations
Award	Wins	Nominations
Bollywood Movie Awards	4	5
Filmfare Awards	6	7
International Indian Film Academy Awards	1	2
People's Choice Awards India	1	1
Producers Guild Film Awards	1	1
Screen Awards	4	11
Stardust Awards	2	4

Totals (Note: Certain award groups do not simply award one winner. They acknowledge several different recipients, have runners-up, and have third place. Since this is a specific recognition and is different from losing an award, runner-up mentions are considered wins in this award tally. For simplification and to avoid errors, each award in this list has been presumed to have had a prior nomination.)
- Wins: 19
- Nominations: 47

Yuva (transl. Youth) is a 2004 Indian Hindi-language political action film directed by Mani Ratnam. The film was simultaneously shot in Tamil as Aayutha Ezhuthu, and it is loosely based on the life story of George Reddy, a scholar from Osmania University of Hyderabad. It stars Ajay Devgn, Abhishek Bachchan, Vivek Oberoi, Rani Mukerji, Kareena Kapoor and Esha Deol.

The film tells the stories of three young men from completely different strata of society and how one fateful incident on Kolkata's Howrah Bridge changes their lives forever. The narrative of the story is partially in hyperlink format. The film was a success at the box office, with a gross of ₹260 million (US$2.7 million). It became one of the highest-grossing films of the year.

The film received several accolades. At the 50th Filmfare Awards, Yuva received 7 nominations and won a leading 6 awards, including Best Film (Critics), Best Supporting Actor (Bachchan) and Best Supporting Actress (Mukerji). At the 6th IIFA Awards, Yuva received 2 nominations and won one award, Best Supporting Actor (Bachchan). Yuva also earned one Producers Guild Film Awards, four Screen Awards and two Stardust Awards.

== Awards and nominations ==
Award (Note: Awards, festivals and organizations are in alphabetical order.)	Date of ceremony (Note: Date is linked to the article about the awards held that year, wherever possible.)	Category	Recipient(s)	Result	Ref.
Bollywood Movie Awards	30 April 2005	Best Screenplay	Mani Ratnam	Nominated	
Bollywood Movie Awards	30 April 2005	Best Supporting Actor	Abhishek Bachchan	Won	
Bollywood Movie Awards	30 April 2005	Best Villain	Abhishek Bachchan	Won	
Bollywood Movie Awards	30 April 2005	Best Supporting Actress	Rani Mukerji	Won	
Bollywood Movie Awards	30 April 2005	Best Editing	A. Sreekar Prasad	Won	
Filmfare Awards	26 May 2005	Best Film - Critics (Note: Shared with Govind Nihalani for Dev.)	Mani Ratnam	Won	
Filmfare Awards	26 May 2005	Best Screenplay	Mani Ratnam	Won	
Filmfare Awards	26 May 2005	Best Supporting Actor	Abhishek Bachchan	Won	
Filmfare Awards	26 May 2005	Best Performance in a Negative Role	Abhishek Bachchan	Nominated	
Filmfare Awards	26 May 2005	Best Supporting Actress	Rani Mukerji	Won	
Filmfare Awards	26 May 2005	Best Art Direction	Sabu Cyril	Won	
Filmfare Awards	26 May 2005	Best Action	Vikram Dharma	Won	
Global Indian Film Awards	25 January 2005	Best Story	Mani Ratnam	Nominated	
Global Indian Film Awards	25 January 2005	Best Dialogue	Anurag Kashyap	Nominated	
Global Indian Film Awards	25 January 2005	Best Villain	Abhishek Bachchan	Nominated	
Global Indian Film Awards	25 January 2005	Best Music Director	A. R. Rahman	Nominated	
Global Indian Film Awards	25 January 2005	Best Choreography	Brinda – (for song "Fanaa")	Nominated	
Global Indian Film Awards	25 January 2005	Best Art Direction	Sabu Cyril	Nominated	
Global Indian Film Awards	25 January 2005	Best Action	Vikram Dharma	Nominated	
Global Indian Film Awards	25 January 2005	Best Editing	A. Sreekar Prasad	Nominated	
International Indian Film Academy Awards	11 June 2005	Best Supporting Actor	Abhishek Bachchan	Won	
International Indian Film Academy Awards	11 June 2005	Best Supporting Actress	Rani Mukerji	Nominated	
People's Choice Awards India	2004	Best Negative Performance.	Abhishek Bachchan	Won	
Producers Guild Film Awards	21 January 2006	Best Supporting Actor	Abhishek Bachchan	Won	
Screen Awards	18 January 2005	Best Film	Yuva	Nominated	
Screen Awards	18 January 2005	Best Director	Mani Ratnam	Nominated	
Screen Awards	18 January 2005	Best Screenplay	Mani Ratnam	Nominated	
Screen Awards	18 January 2005	Best Supporting Actor	Abhishek Bachchan	Won	
Screen Awards	18 January 2005	Best Supporting Actress	Rani Mukerji	Won	
Screen Awards	18 January 2005	Best Supporting Actress	Kareena Kapoor	Nominated	
Screen Awards	18 January 2005	Best Female Playback Singer	Madhushree – (for song "Kabhi Neem Neem")	Nominated	
Screen Awards	18 January 2005	Best Editing	A. Sreekar Prasad	Nominated	
Screen Awards	18 January 2005	Best Action	Vikram Dharma	Won	
Screen Awards	18 January 2005	Best Sound	Robert Taylor	Won	
Screen Awards	18 January 2005	Jodi No. 1	Abhishek Bachchan & Rani Mukerji	Nominated	
Stardust Awards	20 February 2005	Dream Director	Mani Ratnam	Nominated	
Stardust Awards	20 February 2005	Star of the Year – Male	Abhishek Bachchan	Won	
Stardust Awards	20 February 2005	Best Supporting Actor	Vivek Oberoi	Won	
Stardust Awards	20 February 2005	Breakthrough Performance – Male	Sonu Sood	Nominated	
Stardust Awards	20 February 2005	New Musical Sensation – Female	Madhushree – (for song "Kabhi Neem Neem")	Nominated	
Zee Cine Awards	26 March 2005	Best Actor in a Supporting Role – Female	Rani Mukerji	Nominated	
Zee Cine Awards	26 March 2005	Best Performance in a Negative Role	Abhishek Bachchan	Nominated	
Zee Cine Awards	26 March 2005	Best Cinematography	Ravi K. Chandran	Nominated	
Zee Cine Awards	26 March 2005	Best Audiography	Robert Taylor	Nominated	
Zee Cine Awards	26 March 2005	Best Action	Vikram Dharma	Nominated	
Zee Cine Awards	26 March 2005	Best Publicity Design		Nominated	
Zee Cine Awards	26 March 2005	Best Film Processing		Nominated	
