= Miss Brazil World 2015 =

- Date: June 27, 2015
- Presenters: Chris Barth; Juliano Crema; Alessandro Boiah; Sancler Frantz
- Entertainment: Suzy
- Venue: Pedro Ivo Theater, Florianópolis, Santa Catarina, Brazil
- Broadcaster: TVCOM; TV UOL
- Entrants: 36
- Placements: 20
- Winner: Ana Luísa Castro (Resigned); Sergipe; Catharina Choi (Assumed); Ilhabela
- Congeniality: Rebeca Falco; Rondônia
- Photogenic: Marjorie Rossi; São Paulo Capital

Miss Brazil World 2015 was the 26th edition of the Miss Brazil World pageant and 10th under MMB Productions & Events. During this pageant MMB Productions & Events became CNB Miss Brazil, thus this is the 1st under CNB Miss Brazil. The contest took place on June 27, 2015. Each state, the Federal District and various Insular Regions & Cities competed for the title. Julia Gama of Rio Grande do Sul originally crowned Ana Luísa Castro of Sergipe at the end of the contest but Castro resigned the title after the contest due to having an unrecognized marriage outside of Brazil in Belgium and wanting to get her marriage recognized in Brazil. As a result, Catharina Choi of Ilhabela was crowned as the Miss Brazil World 2015 by Castro. Choi represented Brazil at Miss World 2015. The contest was held at the Pedro Ivo Theater in Florianópolis, Santa Catarina, Brazil.

== Results ==
Final results	Contestant
Miss Brazil World 2015	Sergipe - Ana Luísa Castro (Resigned)
Miss Brazil World 2015	Ilhabela - Catharina Choi (Assumed)
1st Runner-up (Vice-Miss Brazil World 2015)	Mato Grosso do Sul - Paula Gomes
2nd Runner-up (1st Princess)	Rio Grande do Sul - Laís Berté
3rd Runner-up (2nd Princess)	Distrito Federal - Thainá Magalhães
Top 10	Espírito Santo - Nathalia Pinheiro; (Pará) Ilha do Marajó - Nathália Lago; Minas Gerais - Júlia Horta; Rio de Janeiro - Viviane Soares; São Paulo Capital - Marjorie Rossi
Top 20	Amapá - Jade Vale Davis; Amazonas - Mayra Dias; Goiás - Monalisa Carneiro; (Rio Grande do Sul) Ilha dos Lobos - Jéssica Lírio; (Santa Catarina (state)) Jurerê Internacional - Juliana Policastro; (Rio Grande do Sul) Pampa Gaúcho - Andrieli Rozin; Pará - Mara Ângela Lima; Piauí - Maria Cândido; Santa Catarina - Clóris Junges; (Espírito Santo) Trindade e Martim Vaz - Larissa Dienstmann

=== Regional Queens of Beauty ===
Award	Winner
Miss Midwest	Mato Grosso do Sul - Paula Gomes
Miss North	(Pará) Ilha do Marajó - Nathália Lago
Miss Northeast	Piauí - Maria Cândido
Miss South	Rio Grande do Sul - Laís Berté
Miss Southeast	Ilhabela - Catharina Choi

=== Special awards ===
Award	Winner
Best Catwalk	Amazonas - Mayra Dias
Best Face	Ilhabela - Catharina Choi
Best Hair	Distrito Federal - Thainá Magalhães
Best Skin	(Rio Grande do Sul) Pampa Gaúcho - Andrieli Rozin
Best Smile	Ceará - Theresa Carvalho
Miss Congeniality	Rondônia - Rebeca Falco
Miss Cordiality	Minas Gerais - Júlia Horta
Miss Duval Leroy	Rio Grande do Sul - Laís Berté
Miss Elegance	Mato Grosso do Sul - Paula Gomes
Miss Health & Fitness	Bahia - Monique Morais
Miss Personality	Espírito Santo - Nathalia Pinheiro
Miss Photogenic	São Paulo Capital - Marjorie Rossi
Miss Popularity UOL	Piauí - Maria Cândido
Revelation Model	Minas Gerais - Júlia Horta

== Challenge Events ==
=== Beauty with a Purpose ===
Final results	Contestant
Winner	Distrito Federal - Thainá Magalhães
1st Runner-Up	Ilhabela - Catharina Choi
2nd Runner-Up	Goiás - Monalisa Carneiro
Top 5	(Rio Grande do Sul) Ilha dos Lobos - Jéssica Lírio; Rio de Janeiro - Viviane Soares
Top 10	Amapá - Jade Vale Davis; Mato Grosso do Sul - Paula Gomes; Minas Gerais - Júlia Horta; (Rio Grande do Sul) Pampa Gaúcho - Andrieli Rozin; Santa Catarina - Clóris Junges

=== Beauty & Personality ===
Final results	Contestant
Winner	Rio Grande do Sul - Laís Berté
1st Runner-Up	Mato Grosso do Sul - Paula Gomes
2nd Runner-Up	São Paulo Capital - Marjorie Rossi
Top 10	Amazonas - Mayra Dias; Distrito Federal - Thainá Magalhães; Ilhabela - Catharina Choi; (Rio Grande do Sul) Ilha dos Lobos - Jéssica Lírio; Minas Gerais - Júlia Horta; Santa Catarina - Clóris Junges; (Espírito Santo) Trindade e Martim Vaz - Larissa Dienstmann

=== Best in Interview ===
Final results	Contestant
Winner	Espírito Santo - Nathalia Pinheiro
1st Runner-Up	(Pará) Ilha do Marajó - Nathália Lago
2nd Runner-Up	Ilhabela - Catharina Choi

=== Evening Fashion ===
Final results	Contestant
Winner	Mato Grosso do Sul - Paula Gomes
1st Runner-Up	Rio Grande do Sul - Laís Berté
2nd Runner-Up	São Paulo Capital - Marjorie Rossi

=== Miss Talent ===
Final results	Contestant
Winner	Espírito Santo - Nathalia Pinheiro
1st Runner-Up	Mato Grosso do Sul - Paula Gomes
2nd Runner-Up	(Santa Catarina (state)) Jurerê Internacional - Juliana Policastro
Top 5	(Pará) Ilha do Mosqueiro - Clícia Pinheiro; Minas Gerais - Júlia Horta
Top 10	Amapá - Jade Vale Davis; Distrito Federal - Thainá Magalhães; Pernambuco - Miriam Silva; São Paulo - Kelly Medeiros; São Paulo Capital - Marjorie Rossi

=== Miss Top Model ===
Final results	Contestant
Winner	Pará - Mara Ângela Lima
1st Runner-Up	Distrito Federal - Thainá Magalhães
2nd Runner-Up	Santa Catarina - Clóris Junges
Top 10	Bahia - Monique Morais; Ilhabela - Catharina Choi; (Pará) Ilha do Marajó - Nathália Lago; Minas Gerais - Júlia Horta; Rio de Janeiro - Viviane Soares; Rio Grande do Sul - Laís Berté; Sergipe - Ana Luísa Castro

=== Multimedia ===
Final results	Contestant
Winner	Santa Catarina - Clóris Junges
1st Runner-Up	Minas Gerais - Júlia Horta
2nd Runner-Up	Distrito Federal - Thainá Magalhães
Top 10	Amazonas - Mayra Dias; Ceará - Theresa Carvalho; (Rio Grande do Sul) Ilha dos Lobos - Jéssica Lírio; (Rio Grande do Sul) Ilha dos Marinheiros - Valleska Magri; Mato Grosso do Sul - Paula Gomes; São Paulo Capital - Marjorie Rossi; Tocantins - Jaqueline Verrel

=== Sports ===
Final results	Contestant
Winner	Mato Grosso do Sul - Paula Gomes
1st Runner-Up	Amazonas - Mayra Dias
2nd Runner-Up	Minas Gerais - Júlia Horta
Top 10	Ceará - Maria Theresa Carvalho; Goiás - Monalisa Carneiro; (Pará) Ilha do Mosqueiro - Clícia Pinheiro; (Rio Grande do Sul) Ilha dos Marinheiros - Valleska Magri; (Rio Grande do Sul) Pampa Gaúcho - Andrieli Rozin; Rio de Janeiro - Viviane Soares; Rio Grande do Sul - Laís Berté

== Delegates ==
The delegates for Miss Brazil World 2015 were:

=== States ===
- Alagoas - Janyele Santos
- Amapá - Jade Vale Davis
- Amazonas - Mayra Dias
- Bahia - Monique Morais
- Ceará - Maria Theresa Carvalho
- Distrito Federal - Thainá Magalhães
- Espírito Santo - Nathalia Pinheiro
- Goiás - Monalisa Carneiro
- Mato Grosso do Sul - Paula Gomes
- Minas Gerais - Júlia Horta
- Pará - Mara Ângela Lima
- Paraíba - Mariana Souto
- Paraná - Annie Spina
- Pernambuco - Miriam Silva
- Piauí - Maria Cândido
- Rio de Janeiro - Viviane Soares
- Rio Grande do Norte - Mariana Moura
- Rio Grande do Sul - Laís Berté
- Rondônia - Rebeca Falco
- Santa Catarina - Clóris Junges
- São Paulo - Kelly Medeiros
- Sergipe - Ana Luísa Castro
- Tocantins - Jaqueline Verrel

=== Insular Regions and Cities ===
- (Rio de Janeiro (state)) Baixada Fluminense - Bárbara Suter
- Fernando de Noronha - Brenda Arruda
- Ilhabela - Catharina Choi
- (Pará) Ilha do Marajó - Nathália Lago
- (Amapá) Ilha de Santana - Lycia Ribeiro
- (Paraná (state)) Ilha do Mel - Ana Agostini
- (Pará) Ilha do Mosqueiro - Clícia Pinheiro
- (Rio Grande do Sul) Ilha dos Lobos - Jéssica Lírio
- (Rio Grande do Sul) Ilha dos Marinheiros - Valleska Magri
- (Santa Catarina (state)) Jurerê Internacional - Juliana Policastro
- (Rio Grande do Sul) Pampa Gaúcho - Andrieli Rozin
- São Paulo Capital - Marjorie Rossi
- (Espírito Santo) Trindade e Martim Vaz - Larissa Dienstmann

== Notes ==
=== Withdrawals ===
- Greater Florianópolis - Ellen Teodoro; Withdrew the day before the finals were held citing health problems as the cause.

=== Did not compete ===
- Acre
- Maranhão
- Mato Grosso
- Roraima
