= Miss Rio de Janeiro =

Miss Rio de Janeiro Miss Universe Rio de Janeiro
- Formation: 1954
- Type: Beauty pageant
- Headquarters: Rio de Janeiro State, Brazil
- Members: Miss Brazil
- Official language: Portuguese
- State Director: Andrei Lara

Miss Rio de Janeiro, also referred to as Miss Estado do Rio de Janeiro or simply just Miss Estado do Rio, is a Brazilian Beauty pageant which selects the representative for the State of Rio de Janeiro at the Miss Brazil contest. The pageant was created in 1954 and has been held every year since with the exception of 1990, 1993, and 2020. The pageant is held annually with representation of several municipalities. Since 2025, the State director for Miss Rio de Janeiro is Andrei Lara. Rio de Janeiro has won two crowns in the national contest competing as Miss Rio de Janeiro and six additional national crowns representing parts of the state.

The following women have competed as Miss Rio de Janeiro in the national contest and won:

- Eveline Didier Schroeter, from Macaé, in 1980
- Adriana Alves de Oliveira, from Niterói, in 1981

== Gallery of Titleholders ==
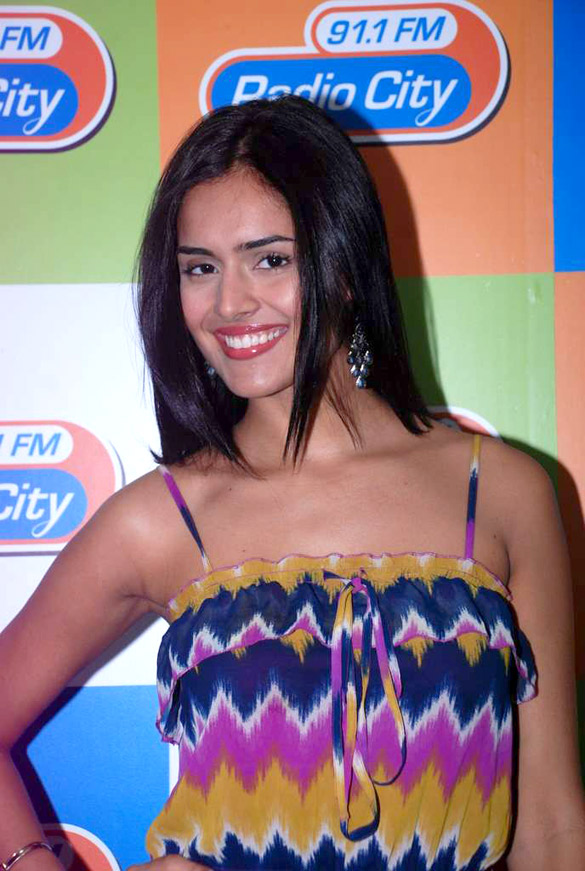
Miss Rio de Janeiro 2015
Nathalia Pinheiro Felipe Martins

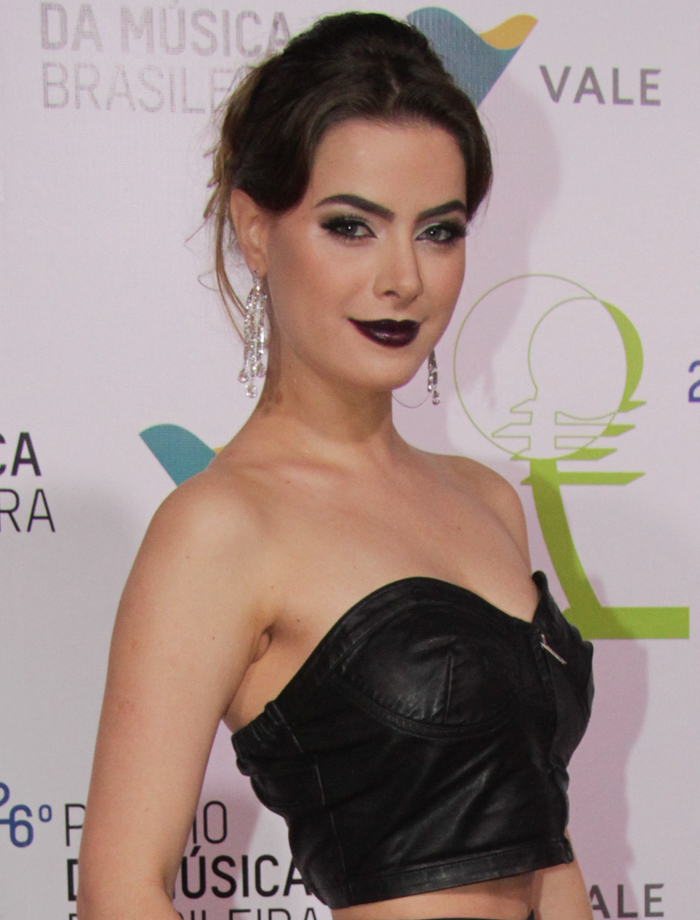
Miss Rio de Janeiro 2012
Rayanne Fernanda de Morais

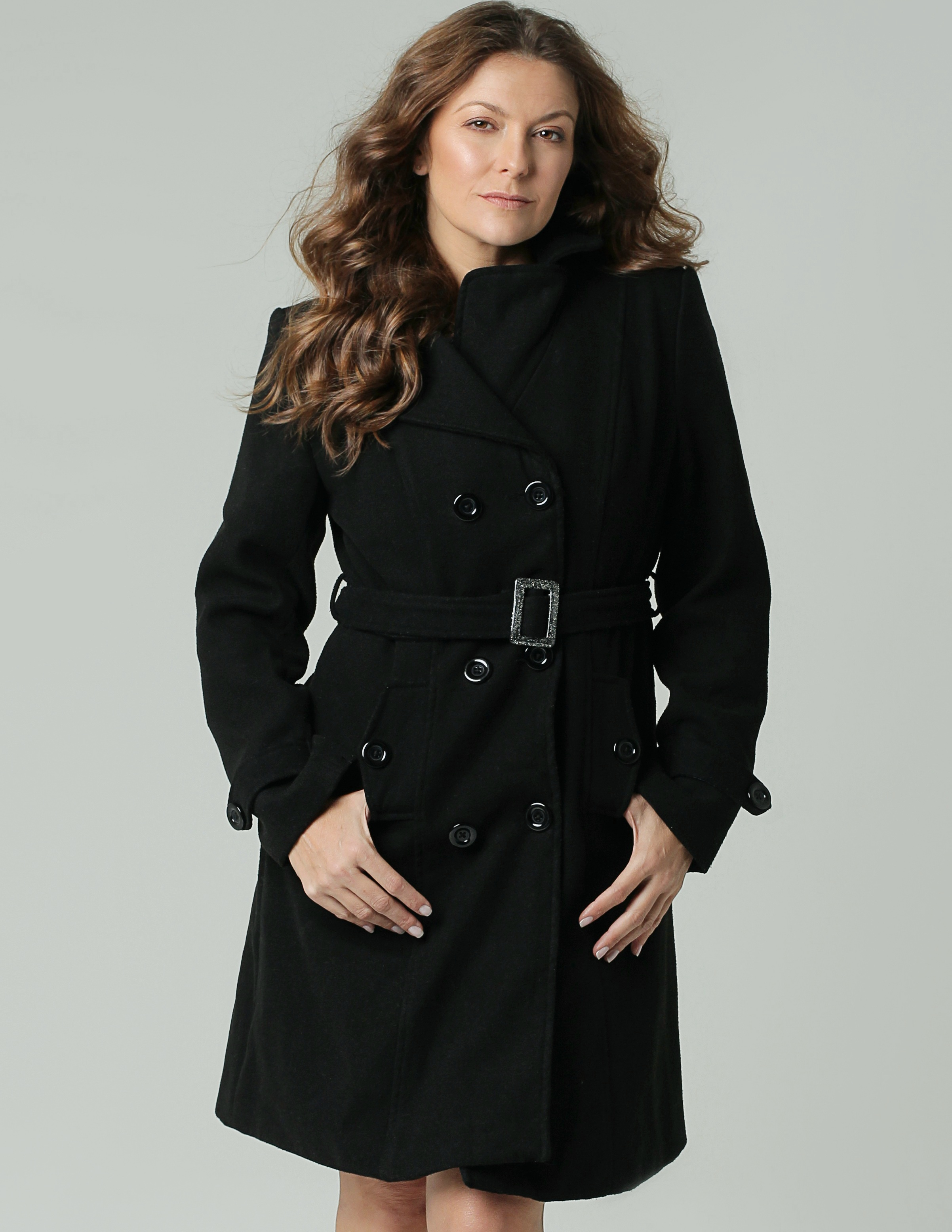
Miss Rio de Janeiro 1998
Alessandra Santos Corrêa

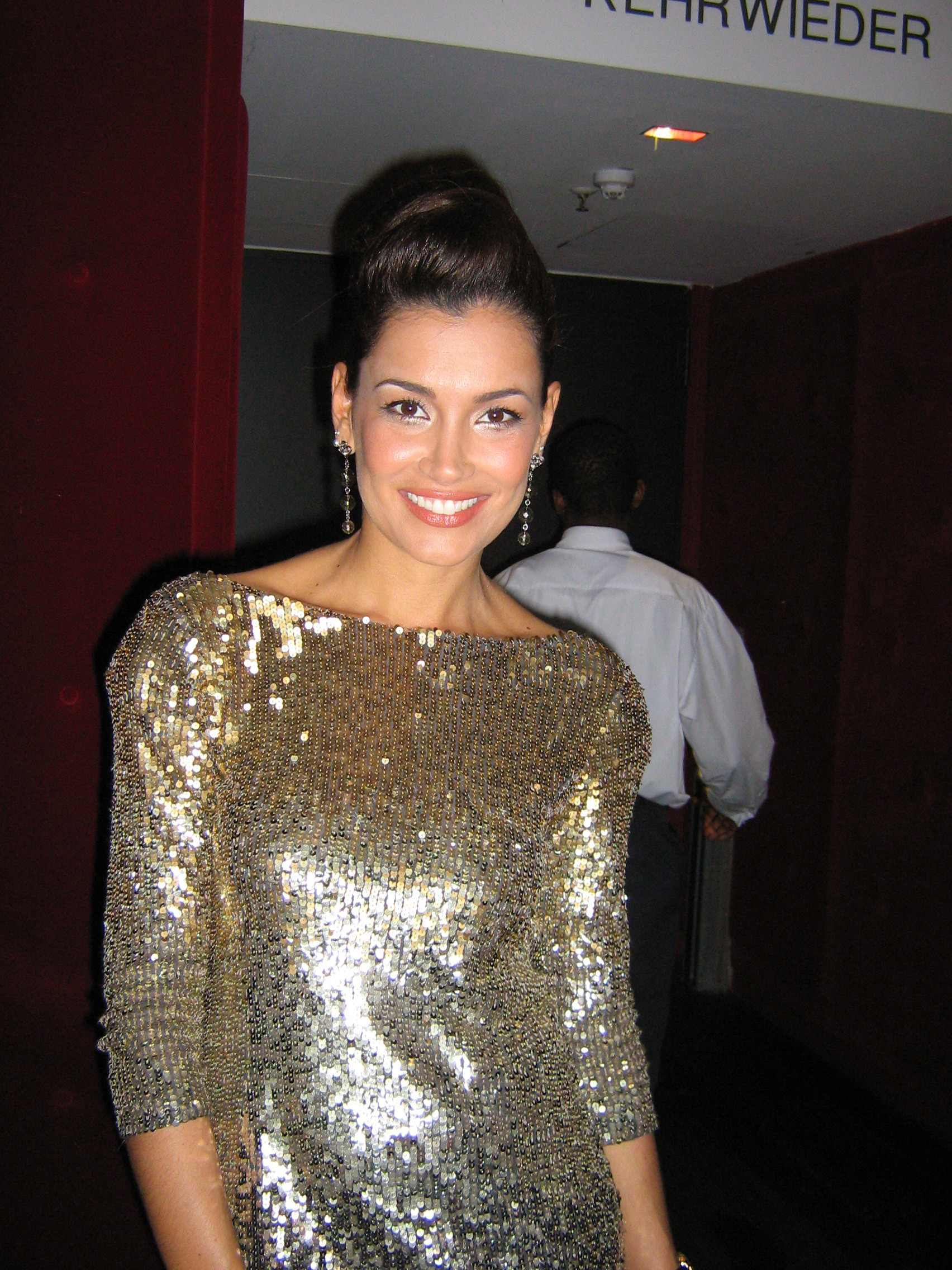
Miss Rio de Janeiro 1997
Janaína Berenhauser Borba

== Results summary ==
=== Placements ===
- Miss Brazil: Eveline Didier Schroeter (1980); Adriana Alves de Oliveira (1981)
- 1st Runner-Up: Zaida Maria Saldanha (1954); Ingrid Schmidt Grael (1955); Vionete Revoredo da Fonsêca (1976); Paula de Souza Carvalho (1999)
- 2nd Runner-Up: Ângela Soares Chichierchio (1978); Márcia Cristine de Carvalho (1982); Valéria Freire Pereira (1984); Renata Garcia de Abreu (1995); Maria Fabiana Mata (2024)
- 3rd Runner-Up: Ely de Azevêdo Pires (1956); Josemary Vasconcelos (1968); Leila Gomes Tancredi (1975); Elizabeth Alves Corrêia (1979); Carla Fonsêca Lima (1985); Patrícia Leal Assumpção (1994); Keity Dembergue Gripp (2000); Gisele de Oliveira Leite (2002)
- 4th Runner-Up: Ilse Ione Hasselmann (1965); Carolina Thaís Muller (1996); Raquel Santos de Faria (2001)
- Top 5/Top 7/Top 8/Top 9: Marzy Moreira (1960); Célia Maria Spíndola Leite (1962); Cecília Rangel Martins da Rocha (1964); Maria da Graça Kury (1967); Ana Maria de Oliveira (1973)
- Top 10/Top 11/Top 12: Kenny Neoob de Carvalho (1983); Andréa Lima Afonso (1986); Gisele Brasil Macêdo (1987); Simone Martins Bork (1988); Simone Fernandes Julião (1989); Janaína Berenhauser Borba (1997); Alessandra Santos Corrêa (1998); Fernanda Louback (2003); Anelise Gomes Sobral (2004); Carolina Soares Pires (2005); Camila Paiva Hentzy (2008); Fernanda Gomes (2009); Thamiris de Moura Ribeiro (2010); Rayanne Fernanda de Morais (2012); Esthéfane Souza da Silva (2022)
- Top 15/Top 16: Aiana do Nascimento (2007); Orama Valentim Braga Nunes (2013); Hosana Angélica Elliot Murta (2014); Nathalia Pinheiro Felipe Martins (2015); Mylena Duarte Gonçalves (2021)

=== Special awards ===
- Miss Congeniality: Marzy Moreira (1960); Ilse Ione Hasselmann (1965); Gisele Brasil Macêdo (1987); Janaína Berenhauser Borba (1997); Alessandra Santos Corrêa (1998); Maria Fabiana Mata (2024)
- Miss Photogenic: Ilse Ione Hasselmann (1965)
- Best State Costume: Mariana Figueiredo Prata Pereira (2011)
- Miss Nutrisse: Rayanne Fernanda de Morais (2012)

== Titleholders ==
Year	Name	Age (Note: Ages at the time of the pageant)	Height	Represented	Miss Brazil placement	Notes
Miss Universe Rio de Janeiro
2026	Bruna Custódio Zanardo	33	1.79 m (5 ft 10 1/2 in)	Niterói	TBD	
2025	No delegate sent in 2025.					
2024	Maria Fabiana Mata	25	1.75 m (5 ft 9 in)	Rio de Janeiro City	2nd Runner-Up	Also won Miss Congeniality at Miss Brazil.
2023	Paula Cardoso da Silva	27		Nova Iguaçu		
2022	Esthéfane Souza da Silva	26	1.70 m (5 ft 7 in)	Volta Redonda	Top 10	Previously Miss Rio de Janeiro CNB 2019 and Top 20 at Miss Brazil CNB 2019.
2021	Mylena Duarte Gonçalves	26	1.75 m (5 ft 9 in)	Barra Mansa	Top 15	
U Miss Rio de Janeiro 2020 and Miss Rio de Janeiro Be Emotion 2020
2020	No national Miss Brazil contest due to the COVID-19 pandemic and change in the national franchise holder which caused the national titleholder to be appointed.					
Miss Rio de Janeiro Be Emotion
2019	Isadora Saraiva Meira	26	1.74 m (5 ft 8 1/2 in)	Barra Mansa		Last Miss Miss Rio de Janeiro Be Emotion
2018	Amanda da Silva Coelho	19	1.71 m (5 ft 7 1/2 in)	Angra dos Reis		
2017	Isabel Cristina Correa Silva	27	1.73 m (5 ft 8 in)	Belford Roxo		Previously Miss Sergipe Mundo 2009 and Miss Ilhas de Búzios Mundo 2014. Top 6 at Miss Brazil World 2009 as Sergipe and Top 10 at Miss Brazil World 2014 as Ilhas de Búzios.
2016	Sabrina dos Santos Amorim	18	1.77 m (5 ft 9 1/2 in)	Niterói		
2015	Nathalia Pinheiro Felipe Martins	25	1.78 m (5 ft 10 in)	Armação dos Búzios	Top 15	Previously Miss Espírito Santo Mundo/CNB 2015 and Top 10 at Miss Brazil World 2015.
Miss Rio de Janeiro Universe
2014	Hosana Angélica Elliot Murta	21	1.82 m (5 ft 11 1/2 in)	Rio de Janeiro City	Top 15	
2013	Orama Valentim Braga Nunes	22	1.74 m (5 ft 8 1/2 in)	Campos dos Goytacazes	Top 15	
2012	Rayanne Fernanda de Morais	24	1.74 m (5 ft 8 1/2 in)	Armação dos Búzios	Top 10	Also won Miss Nutrisse at Miss Brazil. Previously Miss Minas Gerais 2009 and 1st Runner-Up and Miss Brazil International at Miss Brazil 2009. Top 15 at Miss International 2009.
Miss Rio de Janeiro
2011	Mariana Figueiredo Prata Pereira		1.72 m (5 ft 7 1/2 in)	Teresópolis		Won Best State Costume at Miss Brazil.
2010	Thamiris de Moura Ribeiro	18	1.78 m (5 ft 10 in)	Duque de Caxias	Top 10	
2009	Fernanda Gomes	19		Teresópolis	Top 10	
2008	Camila Paiva Hentzy			Teresópolis	Top 10	
2007	Aiana do Nascimento			Niterói	Top 15	
2006	Roberta César Manhães	23		Rio de Janeiro City		
2005	Carolina Soares Pires			Niterói	Top 10	
2004	Anelise Gomes Sobral			Campos dos Goytacazes	Top 10	
2003	Fernanda Louback			Nova Friburgo	Top 10	
2002	Gisele de Oliveira Leite			Macaé	4th Runner-Up (later 3rd Runner-Up)	Originally 4th Runner-Up, became 3rd Runner-Up after the original winner of Miss Brazil 2002 was dethroned and all the Runner-Ups were moved up one place with the 1st Runner-Up becoming the new winner.
2001	Raquel Santos de Faria			Itaguaí	4th Runner-Up	
2000	Keity Dembergue Gripp			Nova Friburgo	3rd Runner-Up	
1999	Paula de Souza Carvalho			Barra Mansa	1st Runner-Up; Miss Brazil World 1999	Unplaced at Miss World 1999.
1998	Alessandra Santos Corrêa			Macaé	Top 12	Also won Miss Congeniality at Miss Brazil.
1997	Janaína Berenhauser Borba			Petrópolis	Top 12	Also won Miss Congeniality at Miss Brazil.
1996	Carolina Thaís Muller			Volta Redonda	4th Runner-Up	
1995	Renata Garcia de Abreu			Rio de Janeiro City	2nd Runner-Up	
1994	Patrícia Leal Assumpção			Macaé	3rd Runner-Up	
1993	No delegate sent in 1993 due to Miss Brazil 1993 being appointed rather than having a contest.					
1992	Luiza Carla Moço de Souza			Niterói		
1991	Ana Paula Machado Ribeiro			Rio de Janeiro City		In 1991, there were two representatives for the State.
1991	Márcia Barbosa da Silva			Rio de Janeiro City		In 1991, there were two representatives for the State.
1990	No contest in 1990.					
1989	Simone Fernandes Julião			Bairro Jardim Botânico	Top 12	
1988	Simone Martins Bork			Bairro da Tijuca	Top 12	
1987	Gisele Brasil Macêdo			Arraial do Cabo	Top 12	Also won Miss Congeniality at Miss Brazil.
1986	Andréa Lima Afonso			Bairro da Tijuca	Top 12	
1985	Carla Fonsêca Lima			Bairro do Leblon	3rd Runner-Up	
1984	Valéria Freire Pereira			Clube de Regatas do Flamengo	2nd Runner-Up	
1983	Kenny Neoob de Carvalho			Bairro de Ipanema	Top 12	
1982	Márcia Cristine de Carvalho			Clube Vasco da Gama	2nd Runner-Up	
1981	Adriana Alves de Oliveira	18	1.83 m (6 ft 0 in)	Niterói	Miss Brazil 1981	3rd Runner-Up at Miss Universe 1981.
1980	Eveline Didier Schroeter	19	1.80 m (5 ft 11 in)	Macaé	Miss Brazil 1980	Unplaced at Miss Universe 1980.
1979	Elizabeth Alves Corrêia			Araruama	3rd Runner-Up	
1978	Ângela Soares Chichierchio			Nilópolis	2nd Runner-Up; Miss Brazil International 1978	Unplaced at Miss International 1978.
1977	Elizabeth Alderidge dos Santos			Nova Friburgo		
1976	Vionete Revoredo da Fonsêca			Rio de Janeiro City	1st Runner-Up; Miss Brazil International 1976	1st Runner-Up at Miss International 1976.
1975	Leila Gomes Tancredi			Rio de Janeiro City	3rd Runner-Up	
1974	Angélica Campanile			Nova Iguaçu		
1973	Ana Maria de Oliveira			Barra Mansa	Top 8	
1972	Marli Pereira Carneiro			Niterói		
1971	Maria Rosária de Lima			Nova Iguaçu		
1970	Eny Machado Fazanelli			Niterói		
1969	Maria Aparecida Leite			Paraíba do Sul		
1968	Josemary Vasconcelos			Três Rios	3rd Runner-Up	
1967	Maria da Graça Kury			Campos dos Goytacazes	Top 8	
1966	Vera Lúcia Cordeiro			São João da Barra		
1965	Ilse Ione Hasselmann			Niterói	4th Runner-Up	Also won Miss Congeniality and Miss Photogenic at Miss Brazil.
1964	Cecília Rangel Martins da Rocha			Cambuci	Top 9	
1963	Miriam Montenegro da Fonsêca			Niterói		
1962	Célia Maria Spíndola Leite			Campos dos Goytacazes	Top 8	
1961	Maria Madalena Aguiar			Campos dos Goytacazes		
1960	Marzy Moreira			Itaguaí Atlético Clube	Top 8	Also won Miss Congeniality at Miss Brazil.
1959	Maria Lúcia Braga			Niterói		
1958	Eunice Pamplona Brito			Nova Friburgo		
1957	Cylis Pires da Rocha			Itaperuna		
1956	Ely de Azevêdo Pires			Niterói	3rd Runner-Up	Originally the 1st Runner-Up at Miss Estado do Rio 1956 but became Miss Estado do Rio after the original winner was dethroned.
1956	Aniko Elizabeth Csettkey			Teresópolis	Did not compete	Did not compete after being unable to prove her Brazilian nationality despite being born in Teresópolis, because of this the organizers of Miss Brazil at the time the Diários Associados and the newspaper "O Estado" (promoter of the contest), decided to withdraw her participation in the contest and dethrone her of Miss Estado do Rio 1956 title and transfer it to the 1st Runner-Up.
1955	Ingrid Schmidt Grael			Clube de Regatas Icaraí	1st Runner-Up	
1954	Zaida Maria Saldanha			Campos dos Goytacazes	1st Runner-Up	
