= Jeevan Reddy =

Jeevan Reddy may refer to:

- Asannagari Jeevan Reddy (born 1976), Indian politician, MLA from Armur Assembly constituency
- B. Jeevan Reddy, Indian film director
- T. Jeevan Reddy, Indian politician, MLA from Jagtial Assembly constituency
