= Sandeep Madhav =

Indian actor

- Other name: Sandeep Kumar
- Occupation: Actor
- Years active: 2009–present

Sandeep Madhav is an Indian actor who works in Telugu language films.

== Career ==
He made his acting debut with Railway Station (2012), where he played one of the lead roles. Sandeep Madhav worked as an assistant director under Jeevan Reddy for Dalam (2013). Sandeep made his lead acting debut with Ram Gopal Varma's biographical film Vangaveeti. In the film, he portrayed the roles of Vangaveeti Mohana Ranga and Vangaveeti Radha, Ranga's brother. A critic from the Deccan Chronicle wrote that "He plays the dual roles of Vangaveeti Radha and Ranga and has done a fantastic job. The two characters have distinct personalities and histories but Sandeep has pulled it off with remarkable talent". Madhav collaborated with Reddy again for George Reddy, a biographical film based on the leader of the same name. Madhav lost weight and exercised to portray George Reddy, who was a student leader and a boxer. In a review of the film by The Hindu, the critic wrote that "Sandeep Madhav leads the show; he looks and walks the part of an academically-inclined and polished student who at first glance wouldn’t be expected to throw punches".

== Filmography ==
†	Denotes productions that have not yet been released

- All films are in Telugu, unless otherwise noted.

Year	Film	Role	Notes
2009	Josh	Student	credited as Sandeep
2012	Railway Station	Ajay	
2013	Dalam	—N/a	Assistant director
2015	Jyothi Lakshmi	Sandy	
2015	Loafer	Thief	
2016	Vangaveeti	Vangaveeti Radha and Vangaveeti Mohana Ranga	Dual roles; credited as Sandeep Kumar
2019	George Reddy	George Reddy	
2022	Gandharwa	Avinash	

== Awards and nominations ==
Year	Award	Category	Work	Result	Ref.
2017	6th South Indian International Movie Awards	Best Debutant Actor	Vangaveeti	Nominated	
