= Mosquero =

Mosquero can refer to:

- Sallong, used on a horse
- Mosquero, New Mexico

== See also ==
- Mosqueiro, an island in Brazil
