= Nathalia Kaur =

Brazilian model and actress

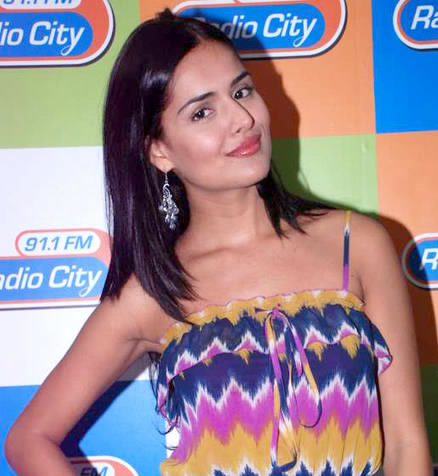
- Kaur at Radio City FM in April 2012
- Born: Nathalia Pinheiro Martins; Niterói, Rio de Janeiro, Brazil
- Other name: Nathalia
- Occupations: Actress; model
- Years active: 2012–present
- Modelling information
- Height: 5 ft 10 in (1.78 m)
- Hair colour: Brown
- Eye colour: Brown
- Agency: Toabh; Auraa Talents; Base Management; Medusa Model; Why Not Model; BMA Models
- Beauty pageant titleholder
- Title: Miss Rio de Janeiro 2015
- Major competitions: Miss Brazil 2015 (Top 15); Miss Brazil World 2015 (Top 10)

Nathalia Pinheiro Felipe Martins, known by her stage name Nathalia Kaur, or simply mononymously as Nathalia, is a Brazilian model and actress who works in Indian cinema. While primarily known for her work as model and special appearances in Indian cinema industry, she also ventured into acting in the movies Rocky Handsome and Guns of Banaras.

== Personal life ==
Kaur was born as Nathalia Pinheiro Felipe Martins in Niterói, Rio de Janeiro, Brazil. Her mother Evanete Pinheiro has Portuguese ancestry, while the exact ancestry of her father is little known; in an interview, Kaur said that she is "half Punjabi", and that her father is half Indian, being her paternal grandfather of the Punjabi and her paternal grandmother of Portuguese as reported by her mother. Later in a 2020 interview, she clarified that her Indian ancestry likely originates from her grandmother's side but was somewhat unclear, and she only used Kaur as a stage name in the Indian movie industry.

In 2015, she dated the Brazilian retired mixed martial artist Antônio Rodrigo Nogueira, but ended their relationship the following year.

== Career ==
Kaur modelled in Brazil and other countries until moving to India upon receiving an offer. In India, she took "Kaur" as a professional surname due to the difficulty of Indians to pronounce her surname. There she won the Kingfisher Calendar Model Hunt in 2012 and appeared in the Kingfisher Swimsuit Calendar that year.

Kaur participated and won the Miss Rio de Janeiro 2015. She went on to represent her state in Miss Brazil 2015 and placed in the Top 15. She also finished in the Top 10 in the Miss Brazil World 2015.

Kaur made her film debut in the Kannada film Dev Son of Mudde Gowda directed by Indrajit Lankesh. Before its release she was cast by Ram Gopal Varma to perform an item number in his next film Department. Earlier Varma had wanted to cast Sunny Leone, but due to her contractual obligations for Jism 2, Varma replaced her with Kaur.

Kaur played her first acting role in Bollywood in the movie as Anna in a supporting role. In 2020, Kaur played her first lead role as Hema in the film Guns of Banaras.

== Filmography ==
=== Films ===
Year	Film	Role	Language	Notes	Ref.
2012	Dev Son of Mudde Gowda	Kavya's friend	Kannada	Debut film; Item number	
2012	Department	Item song performer	Hindi	Song "Dan Dan"	
2013	Commando-A One Man Army	Item song performer	Hindi	Special appearance	
2013	Dalam / Koottam	Item song performer	Telugu / Tamil	Song "Addirabanna"/"Kaalanaa Kannu"	
2013	Bhai	Item song performer	Telugu	Song "Bhai"	
2016	Rocky Handsome	Anna	Hindi	credited as Nathalia Pinheiro Kaur	
2020	Guns of Banaras	Hema	Hindi	Lead role, credited as Nathalia	

=== Television ===
Year	Title	Role	Notes	TV Channel	Ref.
2014	Fear Factor: Khatron Ke Khiladi 6	Contestant		Colors TV	
