= Chyung Eun-ju =

Brazilian-South Korean model (born 1993)

- Born: August 9, 1993 (age 33); Seoul, South Korea
- Other names: Elaine Chyung; Jung Eun-ju
- Citizenship: South Korea; Brazil
- Education: Seoul National University
- Occupation: Student
- Height: 5 ft 7 in (1.70 m)

Chyung Eun-ju (Korean: 정은주; born August 9, 1993) is a South Korean TV host, model and beauty pageant titleholder. Eun-Ju competed in multiple pageants, the most recent being Miss World Korea, where she was the second runner up. Through her placement in the competition, she served as a model for cosmetics company ISOI and represented Korea as Miss Korea in the Miss World 2015 competition.

Jung studied at Seoul National University double major in Business Administration and Spanish. She speaks four languages: English, Korean, Portuguese and Spanish. She is currently a broadcaster at Arirang TV's Showbiz Korea.

== Personal life ==
Eun-ju was born in Korea but moved to São Paulo, Brazil when she was one, as her father set out to start his own small textile business. In Brazil, she attended Graded School, an American school, for 12 years. She then moved to Korea to study in Seoul National University.

== Career ==
=== Miss Korea Brazil 2013 ===
Jung was originally declared the winner of the Miss Korea – Brazil pageant but was allegedly dethroned as Catharina Choi, who was the first runner-up took her place. There have been multiple rumors surrounding her purported dethronement, including third-party pressure and bribery, but none have emerged with evidence.

=== Miss World Korea 2014 ===
Jung competed in the Miss World Korea 2014 pageant and was the second runner up to Song Hwa Young, the winner of the national pageant and delegate for Korea in the Miss World 2014 competition. Jung was also awarded the Miss ISOI title, which included a one-year contract as a model for cosmetics company ISOI. She represented Korea in the Miss World 2015 pageant held in Sanya, Hainan Island, China PR.

Awards and achievements
Preceded by Song Hwa-young	Miss World Korea; 2015	Succeeded by TBA
