= Gita Ramaswamy =

Indian social activist and writer

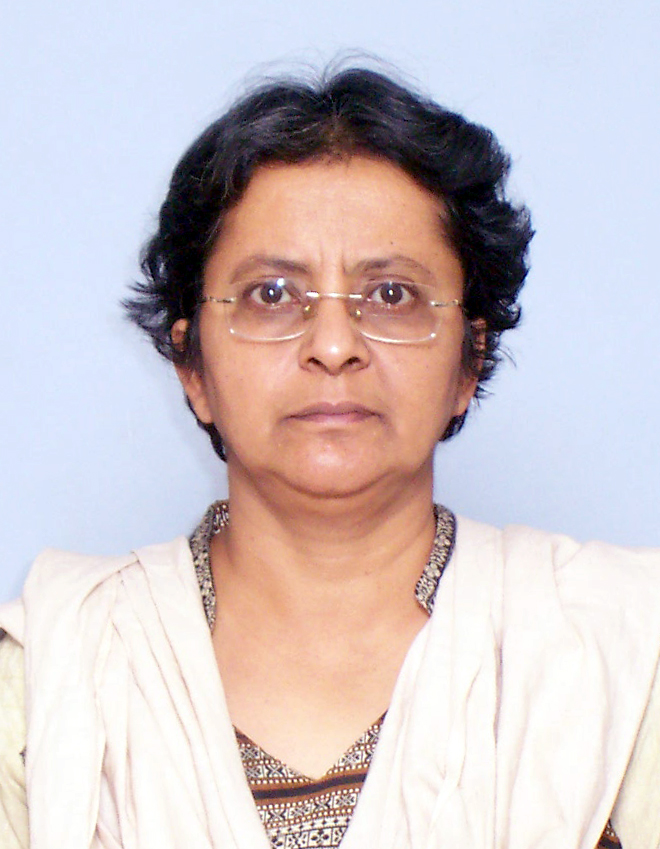
- Born: Sholapur, Maharashtra, India
- Education: Osmania University
- Occupations: Social Activist, Publisher
- Organization: Hyderabad Book Trust
- Spouse: Cyril Reddy
- Relatives: George Reddy (brother-in-law)

Gita Ramaswamy (born 1953) is an Indian social activist and writer.

== Early life ==
Gita Ramaswamy was born in 1953 to K.H. Ramaswamy (Kizhakemadam Harihara Ramaswamy) and Lakshmi Ramaswami in Sholapur, Maharashtra, India. She was the fourth of five daughters. She began her education in Bombay at the Convent of Jesus and Mary School. However, her family moved to Madras when she was nine years old, and stayed there till she was fifteen. In Madras, she studied at the Rosary Matriculation School in Santhome till she was fourteen.

== Career ==
Ramaswamy became a grass-roots organizer and activist for women's rights and the rights of the poor while a student. She co-founded the Hyderabad Book Trust, a non-profit Telugu publishing collective. She has published books in both English and Telugu, as the sole author of India Stinking (2005), and as co-author of Taking Charge of Our Bodies (2004), On Their Own (2005), and The Oxford India Anthology of Telugu Dalit Writing (2016).

She has also translated Devulapalli Krishnamurthi’s autobiography Ooru, Vaada, Batuku into English as Life in Anantharam (2016). She also published an anthology of Gauri Lankesh’s writings in Telugu.

== Works ==
1. Jeena Hai To Marna Seekho: The Life and Times of George Reddy
2. The Oxford India Anthology of Telugu Dalit Writing
3. Here I Am and Other Stories (translation, original by P. Sathyavati)
4. Life in Anantharam (translation, original by Devulapalli Krishnamurti)
5. Taking Charge of Our Bodies: A Health Handbook for Women (with Veena Shatrugna)
6. On their own: a socio-legal investigation of inter-country adoption in India
7. India Stinking: Manual Scavengers in Andhra Pradesh
8. The child and the law
9. Women and law
10. The Lambadas: a community besieged: a study on the relinquishment of Lambada girl babies in South Telangana
11. Nenu Communistuni (Telugu), Biography of C.K.Narayanareddy
12. Maakoddii candaalam (Telugu)
13. Land, Guns, Caste, Woman: The Memoir of a Lapsed Revolutionary
