= Land, Guns, Caste, Woman =

Memoir

Land, Guns, Caste, Woman: The Memoir of a Lapsed Revolutionary
- Author: Gita Ramaswamy
- Language: English
- Subject: Activism, caste, gender, Naxalism
- Genre: Memoir
- Published: 2022
- Publisher: Navayana
- Publication place: India
- Media type: Print (hardcover)
- Pages: 427
- ISBN: 978-81-948654-1-4

Land, Guns, Caste, Woman: The Memoir of a Lapsed Revolutionary is a memoir by Indian activist and publisher Gita Ramaswamy, published in 2022 by Navayana. It chronicles Ramaswamy's journey from her involvement in the Naxalite movement during India's Emergency (1975–1977) to her grassroots activism with landless Dalits in Ibrahimpatnam, Telangana, in the 1980s. The memoir, written in a reflective first-person narrative, explores themes of caste, gender, class, and critiques of the Indian Left and judicial system. It has been praised for its candid storytelling and historical insights but critiqued for limited exploration of personal relationships.

== Summary ==
Land, Guns, Caste, Woman details Gita Ramaswamy's life as a Tamil Brahmin woman who rejected her orthodox upbringing to pursue activism. As a teenager, she resisted her family's attempts to suppress her Naxalist sympathies through shock treatment and sedation. During India's Emergency (1975–1977), she went underground with her husband, Cyril Reddy, and taught English in a Dalit basti in Ghaziabad. Disillusioned by the hierarchical structure of the Marxist–Leninist movement, she distanced herself from it. In the 1980s, Ramaswamy worked with the Ibrahimpatnam Taluk Vyavasaya Karmika Sangam (ITVCS) in Telangana, aiding landless Dalits in reclaiming 14,000 acres of land and securing fair wages and freedom from bonded labour. She also founded the Hyderabad Book Trust in 1980, which published over 400 affordable Telugu books. The memoir reflects on her Savarna privilege, mental health struggles, and critiques of the Indian Left and judiciary.

== Development and release ==
Ramaswamy wrote the memoir to document her experiences and the collective struggles of the ITVCS, collaborating with Sangam colleagues to reconstruct the movement's history. Published by Navayana, a publisher focused on Dalit literature, the book aligns with its mission to amplify marginalized voices. The title reflects the themes of land struggles, violence, caste oppression, and gender dynamics. The hardcover edition, spanning 427 pages, was released in 2022 and endorsed by figures such as Naseeruddin Shah, Kancha Ilaiah Shepherd, and former Chief Justice of India N. V. Ramana.

== Critical reception ==
The memoir received praise for its engaging and honest narrative. Meena Kandasamy, writing in The Hindu, described it as a "fierce critique" of the Indian Left and judiciary, commending its emotional depth and focus on grassroots struggles. Hindustan Times praised Ramaswamy as an "engaging raconteur" whose self-reflexivity highlighted her privileges and failings, making it a compelling account of social movements. Frontline noted its relevance for contemporary activists, emphasizing Ramaswamy's critique of revolutionary violence and her use of privilege to challenge exploitation. Scroll.in called it a "rich meditation on the problems and possibilities of political and social change". Business Standard appreciated its honesty but felt the political critique sometimes overshadowed personal introspection. The Wire praised its discussion of mental health among activists but suggested deeper exploration was needed.
