= Dev Son of Mudde Gowda =

- Directed by: Indrajith Lankesh
- Written by: Indrajith Lankesh; B. A. Madhu; Manju Mandva
- Produced by: Shilpa Ramesh
- Starring: Diganth; Charmi; Ananth Nag
- Cinematography: Santosh Rai Pathaje
- Music by: Dharma Vish
- Release date: 6 April 2012
- Country: India
- Language: Kannada

Dev S/O Mudde Gowda is a 2012 Kannada romantic comedy film loosely inspired by the Bollywood film Wake Up Sid. It stars Diganth and Charmi. Ananth Nag plays a prominent supporting role while the model-turned-actress Nathalia Kaur makes a special appearance. The film is directed and written by Indrajith Lankesh. Jassie Gift is the music director; Dharma Vish scored the background music and two songs which can be seen only in the movie. Shilpa Ramesh is the producer. Award-winning cinematographer Santosh Rai Pathaje is associated with this film as the camera man. It opened across cinema halls on 6 April 2012.

== Cast ==
- Diganth as Dev
- Charmi as Kavya
- Ananth Nag as Mudde Gowda
- Nathalia Kaur as Kavya's friend
- Sudha Belawadi
- Sharan
- Raju Talikote
- Tabla Nani
- Swayamvara Chandru
- Mithra
- Indrajith Lankesh as Deepu (special appearance)
- R. G. Vijayasarathy (special appearance)

== Title controversy ==
Karnataka Vokkaligara Okkoota said that the title Dev, Son of Mudde Gowda is defaming the Vokkaliga community and former Prime Minister H.D. Deve Gowda. Further the association went on to say that "it is a deliberate humiliation to the community and its staple food ‘ragi ball’ (Mudde)." They also said that some posters of the movie were derogatory.

== Soundtrack ==
Dev Son of Mudde Gowda

Soundtrack album by Jassie Gift
- Released: 2012
- Recorded: 2012
- Genre: Feature film soundtrack
- Length: 18:08
- Language: Kannada

Official audio
- Dev Son of Mudde Gowda - Full Album on YouTube

Track listing
No.	Title	Singer(s)	Length
1.	"Dil Se"	Javed Ali	4:11
2.	"Hosa Hosa Kanasu"	Lucky Ali	3:36
3.	"Jalaja"	Kailash Kher, Vijayaa Shanker	3:47
4.	"Gira Gira"	Akanksha Badami	3:44
5.	"Appu Hey Appu"	Chaitra H. G., Chetan Sosca	3:30
Total length:			18:08

== Reception ==
=== Critical response ===
A critic from The Times of India scored the film at 3.5 out of 5 stars and says "While Diganth is at his best, Charmie charms you with her expressions and dialogue delivery. Sharan shines too. While Santhosh Pataje’s cinematography is impressive, music director Jessie Gift has given a couple of foot-tapping numbers". Srikanth Srinivasa from Rediff.com scored the film at 2 out of 5 stars and says "The songs are choreographed and picturised well. Jassie Gift has scored some foot-tapping numbers. Santosh Pathaje's camerawork is adequate. The film is worth watching for its light-hearted comedy". Atul Chaturvedi from Bangalore Mirror wrote "The director’s intention of showcasing everything in rich colours accompanied by camerawork makes the film pleasing to the eyes. Charmee, it looks like, is ready to play the aunt on the small screen. Her liveliness covers up for the extra pounds. Dev S/o Mudde Gowda is a safe bet. Enjoy the mellowness". A critic from News18 India wrote "Jessie Gift's music is the highlight of the film. "Dil se" song is well picturised also. Santhosh Kumar Pathaaje's camera work adds up to the richness of the film. The editing work is also perfect". SV from Deccan Herald wrote " Go with blinkers tightly on your expectations and Dev, which is dud as a dodo, is sure to tickle your funnybones. Ananth Nag, Diganth and Charmi weave their charm on their fans with ease and elan. Enjoy maadi". Y Maheswara Reddy from DNA wrote "However, Dev S/O Muddegowda has its fair share of glamour, entertainment, comedy and loads of sentiment and that makes it a worthwhile watch".
