= Miss Brazil World 2009 =

Beauty pageant edition

- Date: July 4, 2009
- Presenters: Francisco Budal
- Venue: Hotel do Frade, Angra dos Reis, Rio de Janeiro, Brazil
- Broadcaster: CNT
- Entrants: 38
- Placements: 16
- Winner: Luciana Reis; Roraima
- Congeniality: Alessandra Vilela; Paraíba
- Photogenic: Thalita Andrade; Amapá

Miss Brazil World 2009 was the 20th edition of the Miss Brazil World pageant and 4th under MMB Productions & Events. The contest took place on July 4, 2009. Each state, the Federal District and various Insular Regions competed for the title. Tamara Almeida of Minas Gerais crowned Luciana Reis of Roraima at the end of the contest. Bertolini represented Brazil at Miss World 2009. The contest was held at the Hotel do Frade in Angra dos Reis, Rio de Janeiro, Brazil.

== Results ==
Final results	Contestant
Miss Brazil World 2009	Roraima - Luciana Reis
1st Runner-Up	Espírito Santo - Lívia Barraque
2nd Runner-Up	Distrito Federal - Lívia Nepomuceno
Top 6	Acre - Karine Osório; Pernambuco - Karine Barros; Sergipe - Isabel Correa
Top 16	Bahia - Amanda Fróes; (Santa Catarina (state)) Campeche Island - Anelise Laulau; Ilhabela - Karen Rizzato; Mato Grosso - Larissa Berté; Minas Gerais - Jeanine de Castro; Paraíba - Alessandra Vilela; Paraná - Cristiane Kampa; Rio de Janeiro - Mariana Notarângelo; Rio Grande do Norte - Daliane Menezes; Santa Catarina - Karine Nunes

=== Regional Queens of Beauty ===
Award	Winner
Miss Brazilian Islands	(Santa Catarina (state)) Campeche Island - Anelise Laulau
Miss Midwest	Distrito Federal - Lívia Nepomuceno
Miss North	Acre - Karine Osório
Miss Northeast	Pernambuco - Karine Barros
Miss South	Santa Catarina - Karine Nunes
Miss Southeast	Espírito Santo - Lívia Barraque

=== Special awards ===
Award	Winner
Best Dress	(Santa Catarina (state)) Santa Catarina Island - Elisa Hoeppers
Best Smile	Ilhabela - Karen Rizzato
Miss Cordiality	Paraíba - Alessandra Vilela
Miss Friendship	Paraíba - Alessandra Vilela
Miss Photogenic	Amapá - Thalita Andrade

== Challenge Events ==
=== Beauty with a Purpose ===
Final results	Contestant
Winner	Paraná - Cristiane Kampa

=== Beach Beauty Brazil ===
Final results	Contestant
Winner	Rio de Janeiro - Mariana Notarângelo
1st Runner-Up	São Paulo - Jocasta Costa
2nd Runner-Up	Distrito Federal - Lívia Nepomuceno
Top 5	Acre - Karine Osório; (Pará) Ilha do Marajó - Jordana Sidô

=== Best Model Brazil ===
Final results	Contestant
Winner	Sergipe - Isabel Correa
1st Runner-Up	Acre - Karine Osório
2nd Runner-Up	Rio Grande do Norte - Daliane Menezes
Top 5	Mato Grosso do Sul - Lorena Bueri; Tocantins - Karen Jasper

=== Miss Popularity UOL ===
Final results	Contestant
Winner	Bahia - Amanda Fróes

=== Miss Sportswoman Brazil ===
Final results	Contestant
Winner	(Santa Catarina (state)) Campeche Island - Anelise Laulau
1st Runner-Up	(Santa Catarina (state)) Santa Catarina Island - Elisa Hoeppers
2nd Runner-Up	Fernando de Noronha - Raquel Pedonni
Top 6	Goiás - Maysa Chagas; Ilhabela - Karen Rizzato; (Pará) Ilha do Marajó - Jordana Sidô

=== Miss Talent ===
Final results	Contestant
Winner	Pernambuco - Karine Barros
1st Runner-Up	Sergipe - Isabel Correa
2nd Runner-Up	Mato Grosso - Larissa Berté
Top 5	Ilha de Itamaracá - Mírian Suzy; (Pará) Ilha do Marajó - Jordana Sidô

== Delegates ==
The delegates for Miss Brazil World 2009 were:

=== States ===
- Acre - Karine Osório
- Alagoas - Camila Reis
- Amapá - Thalita Andrade
- Amazonas - Cecília Stadler
- Bahia - Amanda Fróes
- Ceará - Lillyan di Cárlly
- Distrito Federal - Lívia Nepomuceno
- Espírito Santo - Lívia Barraque
- Goiás - Maysa Chagas
- Maranhão - Rafaella Lino
- Mato Grosso - Larissa Berté
- Mato Grosso do Sul - Lorena Bueri
- Minas Gerais - Jeanine de Castro
- Pará - Aline Silveira
- Paraíba - Alessandra Vilela
- Paraná - Cristiane Kampa
- Pernambuco - Karine Barros
- Piauí - Verbiany Leal
- Rio de Janeiro - Mariana Notarângelo
- Rio Grande do Norte - Daliane Menezes
- Rio Grande do Sul - Catiane Fredrez
- Rondônia - Érica Henrique
- Roraima - Luciana Reis
- Santa Catarina - Karine Nunes
- São Paulo - Jocasta Costa
- Sergipe - Isabel Correa
- Tocantins - Karen Jasper

=== Insular Regions ===
- (Bahia) Abrolhos - Renata Marzolla
- (Rio Grande do Norte) Atol das Rocas - Tatiana Kochi
- (Santa Catarina (state)) Campeche Island - Anelise Laulau
- Fernando de Noronha - Raquel Pedonni
- Ilhabela - Karen Rizzato
- Ilha de Itamaracá - Mírian Suzy
- (Pará) Ilha do Marajó - Jordana Sidô
- (Rio Grande do Sul) Ilha dos Marinheiros - Débora Secchi
- (Santa Catarina (state)) Santa Catarina Island - Elisa Hoeppers
- (Pernambuco) São Pedro e São Paulo - Harumi Onomich
- (Espírito Santo) Trindade e Martim Vaz - Flávia Monteiro
