= George Reddy (film) =

2019 Indian Telugu-language biographical film by Jeevan Reddy

- Theatrical release poster
- Directed by: B. Jeevan Reddy
- Based on: Life of George Reddy
- Produced by: Appi Reddy
- Starring: Sandeep Madhav; Muskaan Khubchandani; Abhay Bethiganti
- Cinematography: Sudhakar Reddy Yakkanti
- Edited by: J. Prathap Kumar
- Music by: Soundtrack: Suresh Bobbili; Score: Harshavardhan Rameshwar
- Production companies: Silly Monks Studios; Mic Movies; Three Line Cinemas
- Distributed by: Abhishek Pictures
- Release date: 22 November 2019
- Running time: 153 minutes
- Country: India
- Language: Telugu

George Reddy is a 2019 Indian Telugu-language biographical action drama film directed by B. Jeevan Reddy starring Sandeep Madhav, and debutante Muskaan Khubchandani. It is based on the life of the student leader of the same name.

== Cast ==
- Sandeep Madhav as George Reddy
  - Shrinivas Pokale as young George Reddy
- Muskaan Khubchandani as Maya / Muskaan (Dual role)
- Abhay Bethiganti as Rajanna
- Satyadev as Satya
- Shatru as Kishan Singh
- Thiruveer as Lallan Singh
- Manoj Nandam as Arjun
- Chaitanya Krishna as Kaushik
- Devika Daftardar as Leela Varghesin, Reddy's mother
- Yadhamma Raju as Ram Nayak
- Jagan Yogiraj as Jagan
- Bunny Abiran as Manipal Reddy
- Pawon Ramesh as Dastagiri
- Vinay Varma as Minister Ramayya
- Laxman Meesala as Laxman
- Sanjay Reddy as Shankar
- Kautilya as Police Officer
- Jagadeesh Prathap Bandhari as Bheem Naik
- Sonia Akula as George Reddy's Sister

== Production ==
To prepare for the film, director Jeevan Reddy read the biopic of George Reddy. Sandeep Madhav was signed to enact the lead role after the director noticed that Madhav resembled George Reddy. Madhav lost weight to play George Reddy in his early twenties and worked out since George Reddy was also a boxer. A set was erected near by art director Gandhi Nadikudikar near Gachibowli that resembled Osmania University. Five-hundred to seven-hundred junior artists portrayed the roles of students in the film.

== Soundtrack ==
The songs and background score were composed by Suresh Bobbili and Harshavardhan Rameshwar, respectively. The song "Adugadugu Maa Prathi Adugu" was launched by Chiranjeevi.

No.	Title	Lyrics	Singer(s)	Length
1.	"Vijayam"	Chaithanya Prasad	Anurag Kulkarni	3:39
2.	"Bullet"	Mittapally Surendar	Mangli	3:27
3.	"Adugu Adugu"	MEGH-uh-WATT	Revanth, MEGH-uh-WATT (rap portions)	4:33
4.	"Nalage Anni"	Charan Arjun	Charan Arjun	4:56
5.	"Jaji Mogulali"	Vishwas	Indravati	3:12
Total length:				19:47

== Reception ==
The Hindu wrote that "It [the film] had the scope to be powerful and spark conversations about the history of student leaders and their ideologies, among a newer audience. This film doesn’t rise up to that potential". On the contrary, The Times of India gave the film a rating of three-and-a-half out of five stars and wrote that "The film will keep you gripped, move you with its dialogues and leave an emotional, powerful impact". Telangana Today wrote that "His [Madhav's] top-notch acting and the razor-blade fight sequences will remain the highlights of the film". The Deccan Chronicle wrote that "While interesting in parts, as a whole, the makers rely more on the name of the slain student leader rather than the content of his life". The Indian Express gave the film a rating of three out of five stars and wrote, "Director B Jeevan Reddy’s film, which is set nearly 50 years ago, feels just as relevant today".

== Awards and nominations ==
Year	Award	Category	Nominee	Outcome	Ref.
2019	Lake City International Film Festival	Special Appreciation Award	George Reddy	Won	
2021	Zee Cine Awards Telugu	Best Villain	Thiruveer	Won	
