= Catharina Choi Nunes =

South Korean and Brazilian showhost (born 1990)

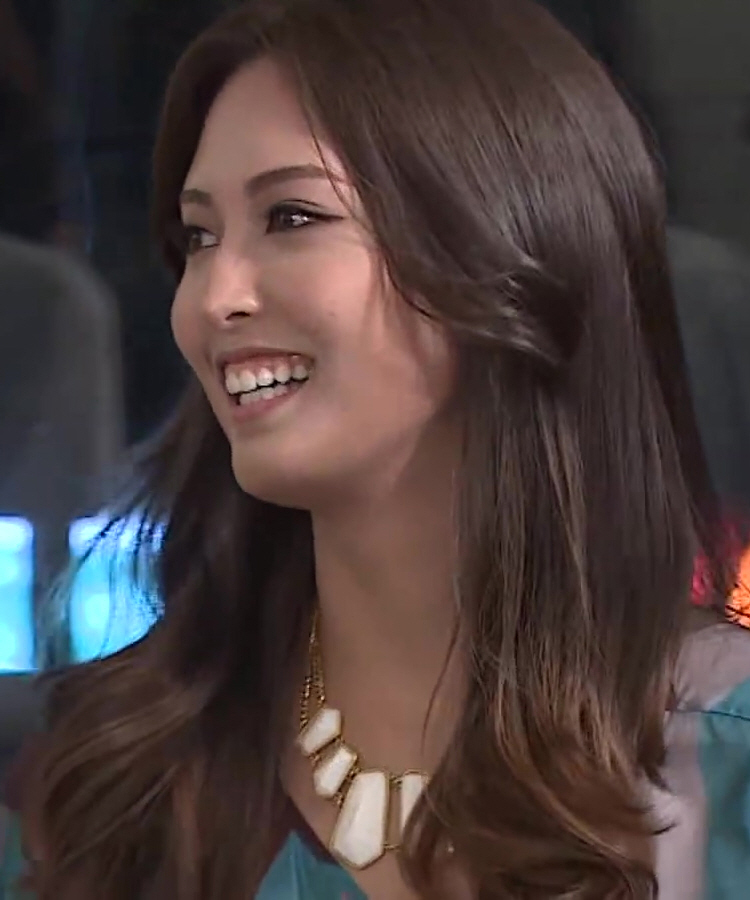
- Born: 24 January 1990 (age 36); São Paulo, Brazil
- Height: 1.76 m (5 ft 9 1/2 in)
- Beauty pageant titleholder
- Title: Miss Korea Brazil 2013; Miss Earth Korea 2013; Miss Earth Fire 2013; Miss Brazil World 2015
- Hair color: Brown
- Eye color: Brown
- Major competitions: Miss Korea 2013; (2nd Runner-Up); Miss Earth 2013 (Miss Earth – Fire); Miss Brazil World 2015; (Winner); Miss World 2015; (Top 20)

Catharina Choi Nunes (born 24 January 1990), also known by her Korean name Choi Song-ee (최송이; also romanised as Choi Song-yi), is a South Korean and Brazilian model and beauty pageant titleholder who was crowned both Miss Earth Korea 2013 and Miss Brazil World 2015. She represented Korea at Miss Earth 2013, placing as the third runner-up, and Brazil at Miss World 2015, placing in the top twenty.

== Pageantry ==
=== Miss Korea Brazil 2013 ===
Catharina joined the Miss Korea Brazil 2013 pageant where she was declared as first runner-up. However, the winner, Jung Eun-ju, was dethroned. Multiple rumors surround her purported dethronement, including third-party pressure and bribery, but none have emerged with evidence. Catharina took over the place and became Miss Korea Brazil 2013. Catharina got her chance to compete in the Miss Korea 2013 pageant.

=== Miss Korea 2013 ===
Catharina joined the Miss Korea 2013 pageant where she was declared as one of the second runners up winners. She was not originally part of the second runners up but the Miss Korea Organization decided to take another place for the 'overseas' candidates. Catharina, being Miss Korea Brazil 2013, filled that position.

=== Miss Earth 2013 ===
"Water is a major component of all life on Earth; save water, save life."

— Catharina Choi's message for Miss Earth.

Catharina replaced Kim Hyo-hee to be the Miss Earth Korea 2013 titleholder. She then flew to the Philippines to compete where she was hailed as Miss Earth 2013 - Fire. Catharina becomes the first Korean to get an elemental title and Asian delegate to snatch the Miss Earth - Fire title.

As a Miss Earth delegate, an environmental advocacy is a must. Based from Miss Earth's website, Catharina's platform for the environment is the cleanup of plastic wastes in the ocean. She explained that because of these wastes, not only the marine animals are being affected by plastics but also because of its "microplastics that are blocking the sun from reaching the planktons and algae, hurting the whole marine food web."

During the entire preliminary activities of Miss Earth, Catharina was able to get a silver medal for the "I Love My Planet Schools Campaign".

During the coronation night of Miss Earth 2013, Catharina emerged as the Miss Earth - Fire or equivalent to third runner up. Miss Earth 2013 was won by Alyz Henrich of Venezuela.

=== Miss World Brazil 2015 ===
Catharina joined the Miss World Brazil pageant in 2015. She was proclaimed as the first runner up. However, the original winner was revealed to be married to a Belgian national. Catharina took over the place and became the new Miss World Brazil 2015.

=== Miss World 2015 ===
She represented Brazil at the Miss World 2015 pageant. At the Miss World, she placed in Top 20 and won the Queen of America's title.

== Personal life ==
She holds a black belt in Taekwondo and was elected a Goodwill Ambassador by the World Taekwondo Federation in 2015, as well as performing a Poomsae demonstration at the 2016 Rio Olympics.

Awards and achievements
Preceded by (Brazil) Camilla Brant	Miss Earth Fire; 2013	Succeeded by (Russia) Anastasia Trusova
Preceded by Kim Sa-ra	Miss Earth Korea; 2013	Succeeded by Shin Su-min
Preceded by Julia Gama	Miss Brazil World; 2015	Succeeded by Beatrice Fontoura
