= Yuva =

2004 Indian film by Mani Ratnam

- Theatrical release poster
- Directed by: Mani Ratnam
- Written by: Mani Ratnam
- Dialogues by: Anurag Kashyap
- Screenplay by: Mani Ratnam
- Produced by: Mani Ratnam; G. Srinivasan
- Starring: Ajay Devgn; Abhishek Bachchan; Vivek Oberoi; Rani Mukerji; Kareena Kapoor; Esha Deol
- Cinematography: Ravi K. Chandran
- Edited by: A. Sreekar Prasad
- Music by: A. R. Rahman
- Production company: Madras Talkies
- Distributed by: Madras Talkies
- Release date: 21 May 2004
- Running time: 161 minutes
- Country: India
- Language: Hindi
- Budget: ₹11 crore
- Box office: ₹26.14 crore

Yuva (transl. Youth) is a 2004 Indian Hindi-language political crime drama film written, produced, and directed by Mani Ratnam. It stars Ajay Devgn, Abhishek Bachchan, Vivek Oberoi, Rani Mukerji, Kareena Kapoor, and Esha Deol. It was simultaneously shot in Tamil as Aayutha Ezhuthu but with a completely different cast, excluding Deol. The film's rights are owned by Red Chillies Entertainment.

At the 50th Filmfare Awards, Yuva won a leading six awards, including Best Film (Critics), Best Supporting Actor (Bachchan), and Best Supporting Actress (Mukerji). Yuva was also a breakthrough for Bachchan as he won the Stardust Award for Actor of the Year – Male for his performance.

== Plot ==
The film opens in media res on Kolkata's Vidyasagar Setu, where mercenary enforcer Lallan Singh shoots student activist Michael "Mike" Mukherjee, sending him and his motorcycle into the Hooghly River. The assassination is witnessed by bystander Arjun Balachandran. The narrative then adopts a non-linear, three-part structure detailing the men's backgrounds and the events leading to their confrontation.

Lallan, a volatile migrant from Bihar, settles in Kolkata's slums after being abandoned by his elder brother, Gopal Singh. Driven by poverty, he enters violent crime and marries Shashi Biswas, an idealistic local woman. His erratic behaviour and domestic abuse destroy their relationship. Through Gopal, Lallan becomes a contract killer and political enforcer for Prosenjit Bhattacharya, a powerful and corrupt politician.

Michael is a brilliant, fiercely independent student leader who organises youth coalitions against political interference in university elections, threatening Prosenjit's influence. He is also romantically involved with his neighbour, Radhika. Prosenjit attempts to neutralise Michael by offering him a fully funded scholarship abroad, but Michael rejects the bribe. Prosenjit consequently orders Gopal and Lallan to crush the student movement. After Lallan brutally assaults Michael's associate Trilok, Michael and the students retaliate.

Arjun, the carefree and politically indifferent son of a senior IAS officer, dreams only of obtaining a visa and emigrating to the United States. He falls in love with Meera, a free-spirited woman. After she questions his sincerity during a playful dispute, Arjun pursues her taxi by hitching a ride on Michael's motorcycle. On the Vidyasagar Setu, Lallan intercepts them and shoots Michael. At Meera's urging, Arjun overcomes his panic, rescues the critically injured Michael from the river and takes him to hospital, where he survives.

Arjun later tracks down Lallan for answers but is badly beaten and suffers a broken arm. During his recovery, he abandons his plans to emigrate and joins Michael's grassroots campaign with student leaders Vishnu and Trilok. Meanwhile, Prosenjit orders Gopal to kill Lallan for failing to silence Arjun, but Lallan discovers the betrayal and executes Gopal. Prosenjit then offers Lallan protection in exchange for kidnapping Arjun, Vishnu and Trilok before they can file their election nominations.

Shashi, hoping Lallan will reform, asks him to meet her at a railway station so they can abandon their criminal life. When he fails to appear, she leaves him permanently. Lallan's associate Dablu also develops a conscience and attempts to free the captive students, but Lallan catches and kills him. Arjun escapes and contacts Michael, only for Lallan to corner him on the Vidyasagar Setu.

Michael arrives, leading to a final confrontation. Michael and Arjun overpower Lallan, but Michael spares him, leaving him bound for the police. Lallan is imprisoned, while Michael, Arjun, Vishnu and Trilok win the independent student coalition seats and enter the legislative assembly as reformist lawmakers.

== Cast ==
- Ajay Devgn as Michael "Mike" Mukherjee, an activist who wants to encourage students to enter politics (Loosely based on George Reddy)
- Abhishek Bachchan as Lallan Singh, a goon working as muscle for politician Prosenjit Bhattacharya
- Vivek Oberoi as Arjun Balachandran, a wealthy young man who dreams of going to the United States
- Rani Mukerji as Shashi Biswas Singh, Lallan's wife
- Kareena Kapoor as Meera, a girl who is going to Kanpur and Arjun's love interest
- Esha Deol as Professor Radhika, Michael's neighbor and also his love interest
- Om Puri as Prosenjit Bhattacharya, a ruthless politician and Lallan's boss who wants to get the college students out of politics
- Anant Nag as IAS Avinash Balachandran, Arjun's father
- Vijay Raaz as Dablu, Lallan's friend who helps Arjun, Vishnu, and Trilok escape
- Sonu Sood as Gopal Singh, Lallan's brother, a goon who had left his brother alone and later gets killed by him
- Saurabh Shukla as Dr. Gopal, Radhika's uncle
- Karthik Kumar as Vishnu, Michael's close associate who acts as a right-hand man to him
- Abhinav Kashyap as Trilok, Michael's close associate who once gets beaten up by Lallan Singh
- Paras Arora as Arvind Balachandran, Arjun's younger brother
- Tanusree Chakraborty as Arjun's classmate
- Kharaj Mukherjee as Advocate Vishal Ghoshal
- Brijendra Kala as Sheshadri, a newspaper editor
- Sujata Sehgal as Joe Mukherjee, Michael's sister
- Lekha Washington as the girl at the embassy
- Simran (uncredited)

== Production ==
Hrithik Roshan was initially offered the role of Lallan Singh, but was replaced by Abhishek Bachchan.

The film was shot at different locations, including Kolkata, Chennai, Bhopal, Theni, Pollachi and other areas of West Bengal. During the shoot in Chennai, ambassador cars were painted yellow to make them look like Kolkata taxis.

== Soundtrack ==
Yuva

Soundtrack album by A. R. Rahman
- Released: 28 April 2004 (India)
- Recorded: Panchathan Record Inn
- Genre: Film soundtrack
- Label: Ishtar Music
- Producer: A.R. Rahman

A. R. Rahman chronology
Aayutha Ezhuthu (2004)	Yuva (2004)	Dil Ne Jise Apna Kahaa (2004)

The soundtrack features six songs by A. R. Rahman, with lyrics by Mehboob. The rap and lyrics for the song "Dol Dol" were written by Blaaze.

All tracks are written by Mehboob.

No.	Title	Singer(s)	Length
1.	"Dhakka Dhakka"	A. R. Rahman, Karthik, Mehboob	04:56
2.	"Khuda Hafiz"	Sunitha Sarathy, Lucky Ali, Karthik	05:02
3.	"Kabhi Neem Neem"	A. R. Rahman, Madhushree	04:49
4.	"Dol Dol"	Blaaze, Shahin Badar	03:59
5.	"Baadal"	Adnan Sami, Alka Yagnik	05:25
6.	"Fanaa"	A. R. Rahman, Sunitha Sarathy, Tanvi Shah	04:41

== Reception ==
=== Critical reception ===
The film received mixed-to-positive reviews from critics, with Bachchan and Mukerji's performances receiving particular praise. A critic from The New York Times wrote that the film "has a sharp political edge that is rare in Hindi-language films, celebrated as they are for their wildly exuberant production numbers and sugary love stories". It was reported that the movie had the narrative style of the 2000 Mexican film Amores Perros.

=== Box office ===
Yuva grossed ₹225.7 million (US$2.3 million) at the Indian box office. It did well in multiplexes, but not in single-screen theatres. Compared to other parts of the country, it fared better in Mumbai. The Mumbai distributors recovered the cost of the film, but the sub-territory distributors in places like Surat and Baroda lost money. In places like Delhi, Uttar Pradesh, Punjab, and even South India, distributors lost around ₹50 lakh to ₹1 crore. In states like Madhya Pradesh and Chhattisgarh, the viewers couldn't relate to the film, hence leading to dismal business. Overseas, too, the film did average business.

== Accolades ==
The film received several accolades, including a leading 6 Filmfare Awards, one IIFA Award, one Producers Guild Film Awards, four Screen Awards and two Stardust Awards.
