= Campeche Island =

Island off the coast of Florianópolis, Brazil

Coordinates: 27°41′43″S 48°27′59″W

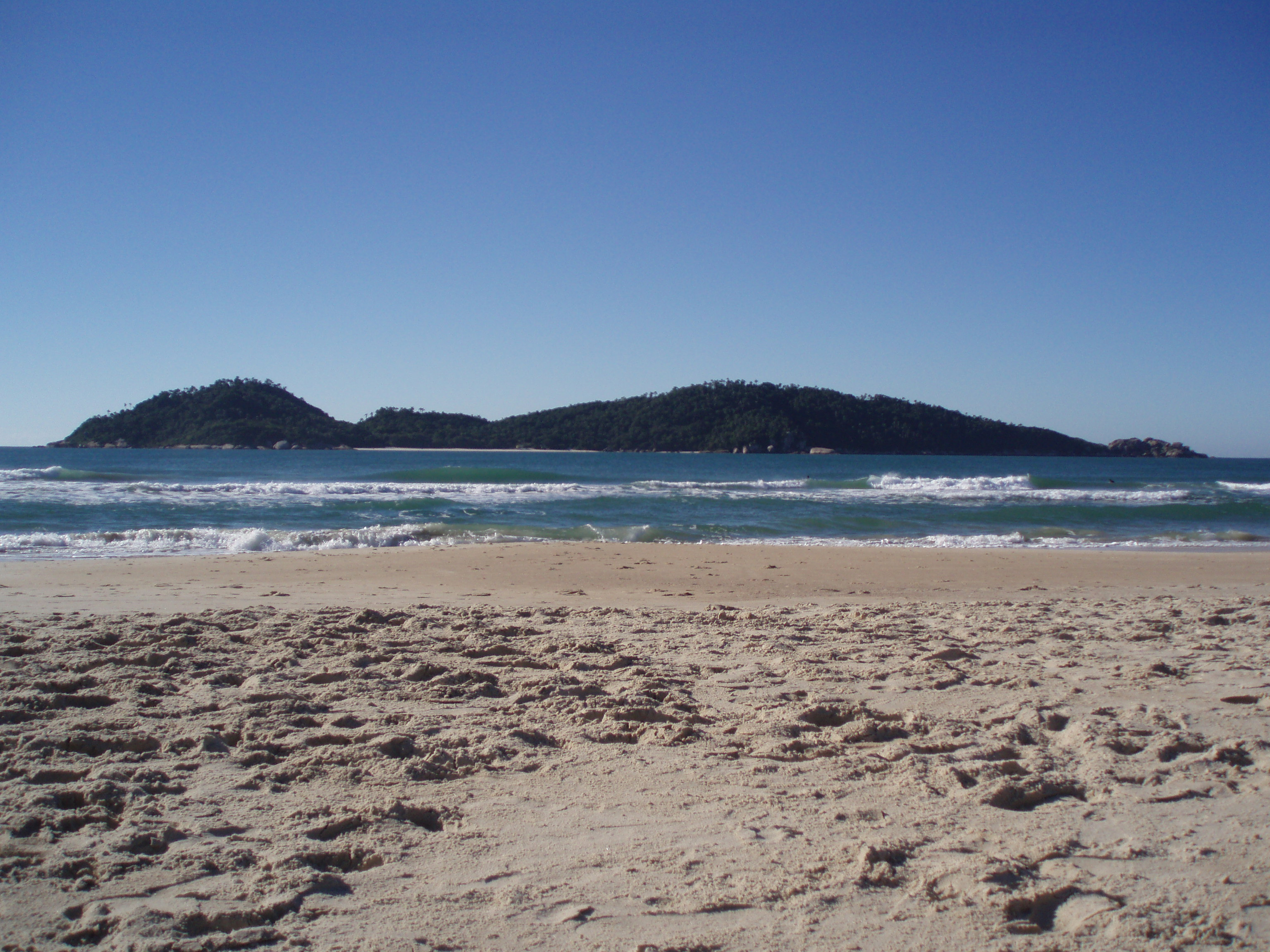
Campeche Island seen from Florianópolis

Campeche Island (Portuguese: Ilha do Campeche) is an island located some 1250 m southeast of the coast of Florianópolis, Brazil. It is located in front of the homonymous beach. It is considered a site of archaeological interest due to paintings found throughout the island.
