= Jurerê =

Beach-side neighbourhood in Florianópolis, Santa Catarina, Brazil

Coordinates: 27.4371°S 48.4987°W

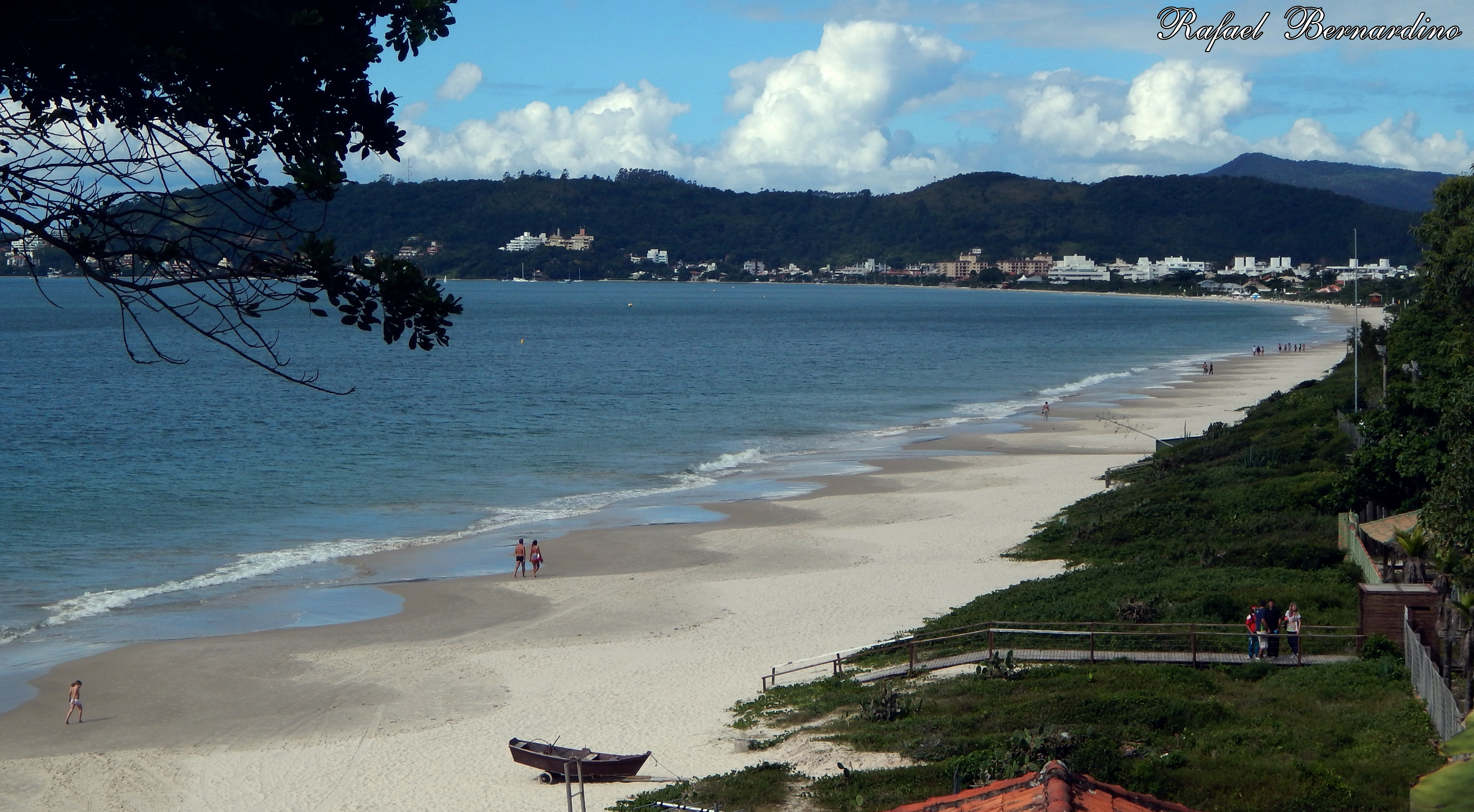
A beach in Jurerê.

Jurerê is a beach-side neighbourhood on the northern shore of the island of Florianópolis in Santa Catarina, Brazil. The Jurerê Internacional resort is located in Jurerê.
