= Aayutha Ezhuthu =

2004 film by Mani Ratnam

- Theatrical release poster
- Directed by: Mani Ratnam
- Screenplay by: Mani Ratnam
- Dialogues by: Sujatha
- Story by: Mani Ratnam
- Produced by: Mani Ratnam; G. Srinivasan
- Starring: Suriya; Madhavan; Siddharth; Trisha; Meera Jasmine; Esha Deol
- Cinematography: Ravi K. Chandran
- Edited by: A. Sreekar Prasad
- Music by: A. R. Rahman
- Production company: Madras Talkies
- Release date: 21 May 2004
- Running time: 155 minutes
- Country: India
- Language: Tamil

Aayutha Ezhuthu is a 2004 Indian Tamil-language political action film directed by Mani Ratnam. The film, loosely based on the life of George Reddy, a scholar from Osmania University of Hyderabad, stars Suriya, R. Madhavan, Siddharth, Trisha, Meera Jasmine, and Esha Deol, with Sriman, Janagaraj and Bharathiraja appear in pivotal roles. Notably, this film is the only Tamil film Deol has ever acted in. The film's title was taken from the name of the Tamil letter ஃ – three dots corresponding to the film's three different personalities from completely different strata of society.

The score and soundtrack were composed by A. R. Rahman, while Ravi K. Chandran and Sreekar Prasad handled the cinematography and editing of the film. The film was simultaneously shot in Hindi as Yuva with an entirely different cast retaining Deol. Aayutha Ezhuthu was released on 21 May 2004, the same day as its Hindi version, and became a commercial success at the box office.

== Plot ==
The film opens in media res on Chennai's Napier Bridge, where hitman Inbasekar "Inba" shoots student activist Michael Vasanth, causing him to crash his motorcycle into the Cooum River. The assassination attempt is witnessed by a bystander, Arjun Balakrishnan. The narrative then shifts into a non-linear, three-part portmanteau structure, exploring the backgrounds of the three men leading up to the shooting.

Inba grows up in poverty after being abandoned by his elder brother, Gunasekaran "Guna," and turns to a life of violent crime. He marries Sashi, an idealistic woman who endures his frequent domestic abuse. On Guna's recommendation, Inba becomes an enforcement thug for Selvanayagam, a corrupt and ruthless politician who exploits Inba's desperation for cash and leverage.

Michael is a brilliant, fiercely independent student leader who actively opposes systemic political interference in university elections, positioning himself as a direct threat to Selvanayagam's youth manipulation strategies. Michael is also romantically involved with his neighbor, Geetha. Recognizing Michael's influence, Selvanayagam attempts to neutralize him by offering a fully funded scholarship to a prestigious foreign university. When Michael flatly rejects the bribe, Selvanayagam orders Guna and Inba to intimidate the student movement. Inba orchestrates assaults on several campus activists, but is ultimately met with defiant, physical resistance from Michael and his core supporters.

Arjun is the carefree, politically indifferent son of an IAS officer, whose sole ambition is to secure a visa and relocate to the United States. He falls in love with Meera, a free-spirited woman. During a playful romantic dispute, Meera challenges Arjun's sincerity, prompting him to hitch a ride on Michael's motorcycle to pursue her. As they cross the Napier Bridge, Inba intercepts them and shoots Michael multiple times before fleeing. Urged by Meera, Arjun overcomes his initial panic and rescues the critically injured Michael from the river, rushing him to the hospital where he narrowly survives.

Following the incident, a transformed Arjun tracks Inba to demand answers, but is brutally assaulted and left with a broken arm. During his convalescence, Arjun renounces his plans to emigrate, choosing instead to join Michael's grassroots political movement alongside fellow youth leaders Suchi and Trilok. Meanwhile, Selvanayagam orders Guna to eliminate Inba for failing to neutralize Arjun as an eyewitness. Upon discovering the betrayal, an enraged Inba kills Guna. Selvanayagam quickly manipulates the situation, promising Inba protection if he kidnaps Arjun, Suchi, and Trilok to prevent them from filing election nominations.

Sashi, desperate for Inba's reform, gives him an ultimatum to meet her at a railway station to leave their criminal life behind; when he fails to appear, she abandons him permanently. Concurrently, Inba's longtime associate, Dilli, undergoes a crisis of conscience regarding their violent lifestyle. Dilli attempts to help the captive students escape but is caught and executed by Inba. Arjun manages to flee and contacts Michael for assistance, but Inba corners him back on the Napier Bridge.

Michael arrives, sparking a violent, final confrontation. Michael ultimately overpowers Inba but spares his life, leaving him bound on the bridge to be arrested by arriving police forces. Inba is imprisoned, while Michael, Arjun, Suchi, and Trilok sweep the student independent coalition seats, successfully entering the legislative assembly as reformist lawmakers.

== Cast ==
- Suriya as Michael Vasanth (loosely based on George Reddy)
- R. Madhavan as Inbasekar
- Siddharth as Arjun Balakrishnan
- Meera Jasmine as Sashi
- Trisha as Meera
- Esha Deol as Geethanjali
- Bharathiraja as Selvanayagam
- Sriman as Dilli
- Janagaraj as Dr. Vishwanath
- Suchitra as Suchitra
- Praveen as Gunasekaran
- Kamala Krishnasamy as Leela
- Krishna as Trilok
- Shankar Sundaram as IAS Avinash Balakrishnan
- Viji Chandrasekhar as Angamma
- R. S. Shivaji as Swaminathan
- Janaki Sabesh as Gowri
- Shwetha as Jo
- Raj as Raj
- Sai Prabhu as Sai
- Vishwa as Vishwa
- Shanthi Williams as Shenbagam
- Muthukaalai as a villager

Cameo appearances

- Karthi as Michael's friend
- R. Sundaramoorthy as a press reporter
- R. Kannan as a villager
- Cool Suresh as Inba's friend
- S. Ramana Girivasan as Inspector
- Prakash Chandra as Michael's friend

== Production ==
=== Development ===
The film began pre-production in April 2003 in a typical manner adapted by the director, Mani Ratnam, who keeps his projects under wraps until completion. The director chose to make two different versions of the film as he did not want the film to be dubbed, explaining that the essence of the script would be lost if they had done so. The project was named Aayutha Ezhuthu after the last letter of the Tamil script, which is denoted by three dots in a triangle and the director revealed that the film was about three individuals. Early reports indicated that the film would be based on the 2000 neorealist Mexican film, Amores perros by Alejandro González Iñárritu, but eventually only the idea of hyperlink cinema was common in both films. However, Ratnam revealed that the film was closer to Akira Kurosawa's 1950 Japanese film Rashomon as both films dealt with a cause-effect and a third-view called Rashomon effect.

=== Casting ===
Suriya, who made his debut in the 1997 Mani Ratnam production Nerrukku Ner, revealed that he agreed "blindly" to star in the film without even listening to the story or his character. Suriya would also be seen in a clean shaven look for the first time in his career to portray a student, and it became a famous look for him. The actor revealed in an interview about Ratnam's choice that "when the master calls for the student you just say “yes”." Suriya stated that his character was based on a real person George Reddy from Andhra Pradesh and to prepare, he read a lot of books and collected a lot of information before the shoot. R. Madhavan was signed on to appear in Ratnam's fourth successive project after playing the lead roles in his Alai Payuthey (2000) and Kannathil Muthamittal (2002) as well as his 2001 production, Dumm Dumm Dumm. The actor bulked up and sported a shaven look for the first time in his career to resemble his character of a ruffian. For a third lead role, Mani Ratnam called Srikanth and requested him to audition for the project in December 2002. The actor had scored back-to-back successes in his first two films, Roja Kootam and April Maadhathil, and was subsequently selected to be a part of the film. However, the actor soon after suffered an injury and was unable to commit to the dates Ratnam suggested. Karthi, the brother of Suriya, was then offered the role but declined the offer to make his debut and worked as an assistant director on the film because he wanted to become a film director and preferred directing to acting. Siddharth, who had previously apprenticed as an assistant director under Mani Ratnam in Kannathil Muthamittal before his making his acting debut in Shankar's Boys, was subsequently signed on for the film. Prior to release, Siddharth felt he was cast as he "looked, talked and behaved like Arjun" and mentioned that the sync sound technique used worked in favour of him as he was an experienced theatre actor. Kannada actor Sudeep was also initially slated to form a part of the cast after meeting Mani Ratnam for the script discussion, but was ultimately discarded from the film.

Malayalam actress Meera Jasmine was signed on to play a slum dweller in the film portraying Madhavan's wife and it was reported that she spent hours perfecting her Tamil for the film, trying to get rid of her native Malayalam accent to adapt to the sound sync technique used. Relatively newcomer Trisha was also signed on to play a youngster in the film and dubbed for her own voice for the first time. Initially Simran was signed on to play the roles of Geetanjali in both versions, but opted out after she began to have problems speaking Tamil as the sound for the film was recorded live. Esha Deol, daughter of actress Hema Malini, was then selected to play the role in the Tamil version of the film after Suhasini enquired whether she could speak Tamil. After finishing her work in Aaytha Ezhuthu, Deol was signed on for the Hindi version of the film too after Simran also opted out of that role and thus Deol became the only common leading actor between the versions. To prepare for her role, Deol worked on certain pronunciations of Iyer Tamil with Mani Ratnam's assistant Kannan mentoring her progress. It was also reported that actress Nadhiya had signed the film and would make a comeback to films after a ten-year sabbatical but did not eventually form a part of the final cast.

The director initially opted against using songs in the film but wanted to create an album with A. R. Rahman for the project. However, after the songs were recorded, Mani Ratnam had a change of heart and chose to include them. For the art direction in the film, Sabu Cyril studied each character in-depth, giving them a distinct colour, mood, and background to suit their temperament. For Michael's house in the film, Cyril followed the arrangement in his own house and used some of his own photographs for decorations. He also expressed that he had great difficulty in re-creating the streets of Kolkata for the Hindi version of the film in Chennai. G. Ramesh was selected to be the hairdresser for the three lead actors in the film.

=== Filming ===
The scene filmed at Napier Bridge in Chennai was canned in early December 2003, the same time during which Suriya changed his getup and started filming for his another 2004 release, Perazhagan, but the schedule caused severe traffic and congestion in that area. Mani Ratnam began the Tamil version after Vivek Oberoi suffered an injury during the making of Yuva, giving him time to extract more out his actors in the Tamil version. Production work for the film began in September 2003, with the technical crew who were mostly from the Tamil film industry including the production house were part of the Hindi version and were retained for the Tamil scenes. The Tamil version finished subsequently much earlier than the Hindi version. Some scenes featuring Suriya were also shot at the University of Madras, Mani Ratnam's alma mater. The scene where Suriya and Madhavan confront each other was shot at Broken Bridge, Chennai.

== Soundtrack ==
The music was composed by A. R. Rahman.

All lyrics are written by Vairamuthu, except where noted.

Tamil
No.	Title	Singer(s)	Length
1.	"Hey Goodbye Nanba"	Lucky Ali, Sunitha Sarathy, Karthik, Shankar Mahadevan	5:02
2.	"Sandakozhi"	Madhushree	4:50
3.	"Nenjam Ellam"	Adnan Sami, Sujatha Mohan, A. R. Rahman	5:21
4.	"Dol Dol" (Lyrics:Blaaze)	Blaaze, Shahin Badar (Ethnic Vocals)	3:55
5.	"Yaakai Thiri"	A. R. Rahman, Sunitha Sarathy, Pop Shalini, Tanvi Shah	4:39
6.	"Jana Gana Mana"	A. R. Rahman, Karthik	4:56

Score
No.	Title	Singer(s)	Length
7.	"Nee Mazhai" (No lyrics, just score)	Sunitha Sarathy, Karthik	1:09
8.	"En Jeevane" (No lyrics, just score)	Manicka Vinayagam	2:25
Total length:			32:17

All lyrics are written by Veturi, except where noted.

Telugu
No.	Title	Singer(s)	Length
1.	"Hey Goodbye Priya"	Sunitha Sarathy, Shankar Mahadevan, Lucky Ali, Karthik	5:01
2.	"Sankurathri Kodi"	Madhushree, A. R. Rahman	4:55
3.	"Dol Dol" (lyrics:Blaaze)	Blaaze, Shahin Badar (Ethnic Vocals)	4:01
4.	"Vachinda Megham"	Adnan Sami, Sujatha Mohan	5:24
5.	"Deham Thiri"	Sunitha Sarathy, A. R. Rahman, Tanvi Shah	4:35
6.	"Jana Gana Mana"	A. R. Rahman, Karthik	4:59
Total length:			28:55

== Release ==
Aayutha Ezhuthu was released in theatres on 21 May 2004. It had its television premiere on 16 September 2007 on Kalaignar TV. The Telugu dubbed version "Yuva" was also released that same day of 21 May 2004.

== Critical reception ==
Sify wrote "Aayitha Ezhuthu is a bold and daring move by Mani Ratnam to change the staid style of our commercial cinema." Malathi Rangarajan of The Hindu wrote "Every frame of Madras Talkies' "Aayudha Ezhuthu" bears the Mani Ratnam stamp and that's what matters. Tamil cinema is in dire need of more such makers as Mani Ratnam." Visual Dasan of Kalki wrote that the usual exuberance that permeates Mani Ratnam's films is also present in the film, but there is no intensity in the flood; only the murmur of the stream. G. Ulaganathan of Deccan Herald wrote "Mani etches his characters well and deglamourises his heroines all of whom resemble the girl next door. Though the screenplay is taut and slick with brilliant camera by Ravi K Chandran, the meticulously crafted sets of Sabu Cyril, background score of A R Rahman, a major part of the credit should go to two heroes — Madhavan and Surya. The overdose of politics in the climax is a handicap. Nevertheless, Ayutha Ezhuthu is a film worth going miles to watch".
