= B. Jeevan Reddy =

Indian director and writer

- Other name: M. Jeevan
- Occupation: Film director
- Years active: 2008–present

B. Jeevan Reddy is an Indian film director who works in predominantly Telugu-language films. He is known for his work in George Reddy (2019).

== Career ==
B. Jeevan Reddy worked as an assistant director for Raksha (2008) and Ram Gopal Varma's Katha Screenplay Darsakatvam Appalaraju (2011) before making his directorial debut with Dalam (2013). The film was simultaneously shot in Tamil as Koottam and released in 2014. The film received mixed reviews upon release. His next film was George Reddy (2019), which was based on the person of the eponymous name. Reddy researched about George Reddy for one and a half years before making the film. The film released to above average reviews, with one critic from The Times of India noting that "Jeevan stays true to the incidents that rocked Andhra Pradesh's politics in the 60s and 70s. At no point, does he try to make the character seem larger-than-life, and keeps things real, making George Reddy a gripping watch".

== Filmography ==
†	Denotes productions that have not yet been released

Year	Film	Director	Writer	Notes
2008	Raksha	Assistant	Dialogues	
2013	Dalam	Yes	Yes	Simultaneously shot in Tamil as Koottam
2019	George Reddy	Yes	Yes	
2022	Chor Bazaar	Yes	Yes	
