= Dalam =

2013 Indian film by B. Jeevan Reddy

- Promotional poster - Telugu version
- Directed by: B. Jeevan Reddy
- Written by: Shankar Devaraj
- Screenplay by: B. Jeevan Reddy
- Story by: B. Jeevan Reddy
- Produced by: M. Sumanth Kumar Reddy
- Starring: Naveen Chandra; Piaa Bajpai; Nassar; Kishore; Abhimanyu Singh
- Cinematography: Sudhakar Reddy Yakkanti
- Edited by: Madhu G. Reddy
- Music by: James Vasanthan
- Production companies: The Mammoth Media & Entertainment
- Release dates: 15 August 2013 (Telugu); 4 April 2014 (Tamil)
- Country: India
- Languages: Telugu; Tamil

Dalam (transl. Group/Gang) is a 2013 Indian action thriller film by debutant director B. Jeevan Reddy, a protégé of noted Indian director Ram Gopal Varma. The film was simultaneously shot in Telugu and Tamil with the latter version titled as Koottam (transl. Crowd). The film starring Naveen Chandra, Piaa Bajpai, Nassar, Abhimanyu Singh, and Kishore tells the story of a group of former naxals and their struggles against the police and politicians when they start their lives afresh from jail. The Telugu version was released in the first week of 15 August 2013 while the Tamil version was released in 2014.

== Plot ==
The scene begins in a Naxal-infested area, where a gun battle is ensuing between the state policeman and the Naxals. In the battle, the Naxals lose many men. They decide to forgo their pursuit of war and hand themselves to the government. During their time in jail, they undergo many tortures, but then one of the jail's seniors offers the Naxals to switch sides to the police and do hit jobs.

== Cast ==
- Naveen Chandra as Abhi
- Kishore as Shatru/Chatru
- Piaa Bajpai as Shruthi
- Nassar as JK
- Abhimanyu Singh as Ladda
- Krishnudu as Veerabhadram
- Subbaraju
- Saikumar
- Pragathi as Shruthi's mother
- Ramaraju as N. Laxman
- Ajay
- Thagubothu Ramesh as Yadagiri "Yadav"/Prabhu Deva
- Dhanraj as A. K. 47 alias Nataraj
- Harsha Vardhan
- Prudhvi Raj
- Chatrapathi Sekhar
- Nathalia Kaur as Item Number

== Production ==
Piaa Bajpai shot for the film for 35 days. Part of the film was shot in Dallapalli near Araku Valley.

== Soundtrack ==
The music was composed by James Vasanthan.

Dalam / Koottam

Soundtrack album by James Vasanthan
- Released: 2013
- Recorded: 2013
- Genre: Soundtrack
- Length: 22:31 (Telugu); 22:33 (Tamil)
- Languages: Telugu; Tamil
- Labels: Vega Entertainment (Telugu); Saregama (Tamil)
- Producer: James Vasanthan

James Vasanthan chronology
Puthagam (2013)	Dalam / Koottam (2013)	Nagaraja Cholan MA, MLA (2013)

Track list - Telugu
No.	Title	Lyrics	Singer(s)	Length
1.	"Yetellinaa Aranyame"	Sirivennela Seetharama Sastry	Vijay Yesudas	3:09
2.	"Thayya Thayya"	Krishna Chaitanya	Dhananjay, Belly Raj, Raghu, Somasundar, Prasad	4:44
3.	"Ikkadi Nundi Ekkadi Dhakaa"	Ananta Sriram	Haricharan, Shweta Mohan	5:26
4.	"Addirabanna"	Sahithi	Priya Subramaniam	4:48
5.	"Ekbaar Esukora Theenmar"	Krishna Chaitanya	Dhananjay, Sunandan, Srinivas, Pooja	4:24
Total length:				22:31

Track list - Tamil
No.	Title	Lyrics	Singer(s)	Length
1.	"Pattaana Kunjamum (Kannala Unnatha)"	Sumathi	Arvind Raj, Bellie Raj, R. Ajay, Somasunder R.	4:40
2.	"Ithanai Dhooram"	Madhan Karky	Haricharan, Shweta Mohan	5:23
3.	"Yeni Mela"	Mohan Rajan	Sunandan, V.V. Prasanna	4:25
4.	"Nigarputha Pinangal"	Madhan Karky	Vijay Yesudas	3:15
5.	"Kaalanaa Kannu"	Mohan Rajan	Priya Subramanian	4:50
Total length:				22:33

== Release and reception ==
Reviewing the Telugu version, a critic from The Times of India rated the film two-and-a-half out of five stars and wrote, "Antics and some nifty cinematography are the most watchable parts of the movie, so it will help if you watch the movie with lowered expectations". Reviewing the Tamil version, Malini Mannath of The New Indian Express writing that "Koottam has a plot with the potential to turn into a riveting thriller. It would probably have, had the screenplay been more coherent and focused".
