= Mosqueiro =

Island in Pará State, Brazil

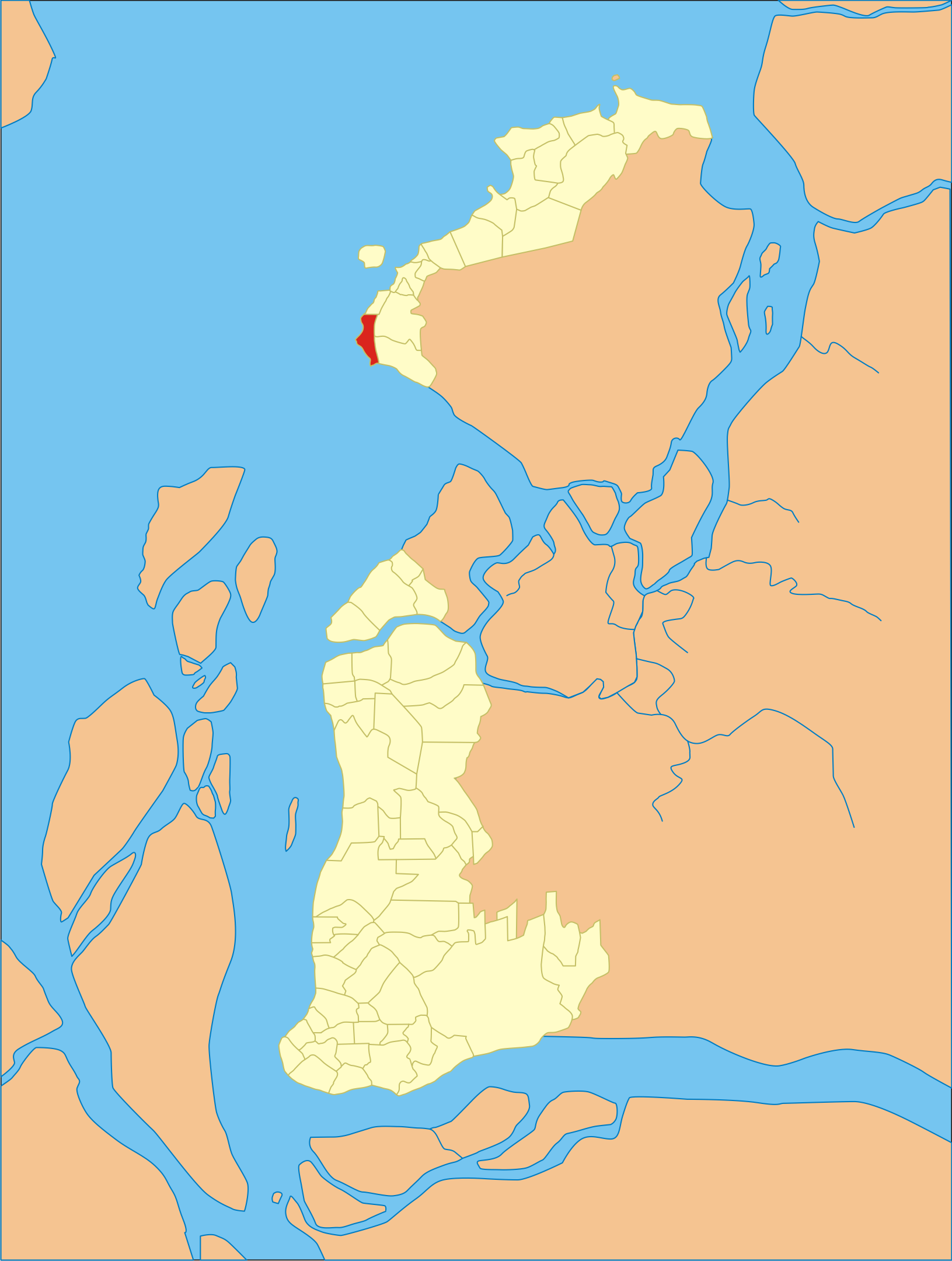
- Island of Mosqueiro (with the city of Belém in yellow, and the town of Vila in red)

- Location within Pará Location within Brazil
- Etymology: Probably from the Tupinambá word "moqueio"

Geography
- Location: Pará River in Belém
- Coordinates: 1.1°S 48.4°W
- Area: 191 km^{2} (74 sq mi)
- Country: Brazil
- Region: North
- State: Pará
- Mesoregion: Belém Metropolitan Area
- City: Belém

Demographics
- Population: 27,000

Mosqueiro is an island near the south bank of the Pará River in the Brazilian state of Pará. Since July 6, 1989, the northwest coast of the island has comprised an administrative district of the city of Belém, roughly 67 km (42 mi) north of the downtown area of the city. The island has 17 km (11 mi) of beaches with freshwater tides, which draw vacationers primarily in the dry season. The largest settlement on the island is the town of Vila (often referred to simply as Mosqueiro) on the westernmost part of the island.

== Origin of the name ==
Scholars have attributed the name Mosqueiro to a corruption of the native Tupinambá word moqueio, which referred to the local practice of smoking meat and fish. In the early period of Portuguese colonization, the Tupinambá supplied smoked meat and fish to the city of Belém. The Portuguese, unfamiliar with the term moqueio, called the island Mosqueiro, which was the name of several places on the Iberian Peninsula. In Portuguese, the word mosqueiro means "flypaper".

== History ==
The Tupinambá had fled to Mosqueiro after the arrival of Europeans in the North-East of Brazil. They were there when the Portuguese arrived. At the beginning of the 18th Century, the French and the Aruã laid siege to the village Murubira on the island for a year.

The rubber boom brought electricity to the island. It also started to be sought as a tourist destination. On 12 January 1976, a 1,457 metres (1,593 yd) long bridge called Ponte Sebastião R. de Oliveira was inaugurated, connecting it to the mainland.

== Climate ==
The island has a tropical climate, with an average temperature of 27 °C (81 °F). The rainy season peaks in March, while the dry season peaks in November.

== Landmarks ==
=== Chapéu Virado ===
The Chapéu Virado is located on the plaza bearing its name, at the intersection of avenues 16 de Novembro and Beira Mar. It was originally a modest inn and restaurant of wood construction, dating from the heyday of the rubber plantation industry in the late nineteenth to early twentieth centuries. The hotel was constructed in a mix of European architectural styles, with allowances for the local climate. After the original structure was destroyed by fire, the mayor of Belém and the governor of Pará provided funding for its reconstruction.

=== Capelinha do Sagrado Coração de Jesus (Chapel of the Sacred Heart of Jesus) ===
The Capelinha do Sagrado Coração de Jesus, located on the plaza Chapéu Virado, was constructed by Guilherme Augusto de Miranda Filho in fulfillment of a promise he made to God while ill on the island, in exchange for the return of his health. The chapel was dedicated on December 17, 1909, by the acting archbishop of Belém. On the second Sunday in December, the chapel holds a special observation for the patron saint of the people of Mosqueiro.

=== Villa Porto Franco ===
Located on the plaza Chapéu Virado, the neoclassical Villa Porto Franco was once home to Portuguese artist José Franco.

=== Sebastião Rabelo de Oliveira Bridge ===
The Sebastião Rabelo de Oliveira Bridge, at a length of 1,430 m (4,690 ft), connects Mosqueiro with the mainland. The bridge was inaugurated on January 12, 1976, with Brazilian president Ernesto Geisel in attendance.

=== Parque Municipal da Ilha de Mosqueiro (Mosqueiro Island Municipal Park) ===
Since 1988, 190 hectares (1.9 km^{2}) of the island have been set aside as a municipal park by the city of Belém, which is seeking to promote ecotourism. The park includes 3 km (1.9 mi) of trails. The Brazilian Ministry of the Environment has approved an investment of R$200,000 (approximately US$90,000 as of 2014) in physical infrastructure, including a pier, administrative building, and research center.

== Neighbourhoods ==
Formally part of the city of Belém, Mosqueiro is administratively divided into the following neighbourhoods (bairros):

- Aeroporto
- Ariramba
- Baía do Sol
- Bonfim
- Carananduba
- Caruara
- Chapéu Virado
- Farol
- Furo das Marinhas
- Mangueiras
- Maracajá
- Marahú
- Murubira
- Natal Murubira
- Paraíso
- Porto Arthur
- Praia Grande
- São Francisco
- Vila

== Wildlife ==
In June 2011, an amphibian identified as belonging to the species Atretochoana eiselti was photographed near Praia de Marahú, on the island of Mosqueiro. A. eiselti, previously known only from two preserved specimens dating from the late 1800s, is the largest known lungless tetrapod.

== Gallery ==
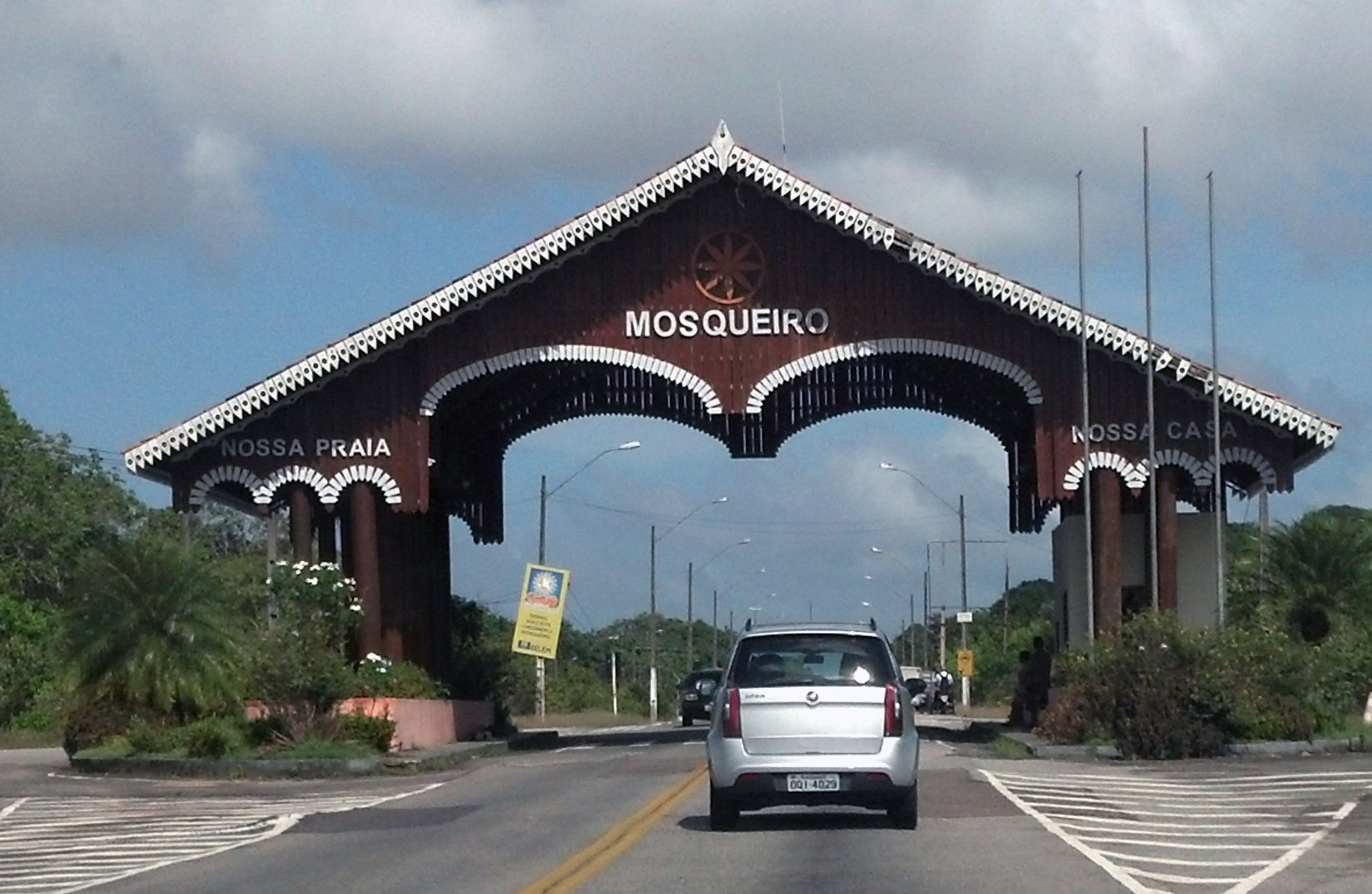
Welcome arch on Pará Highway 391, which reads (in Portuguese): "Mosqueiro: our beach, our home"

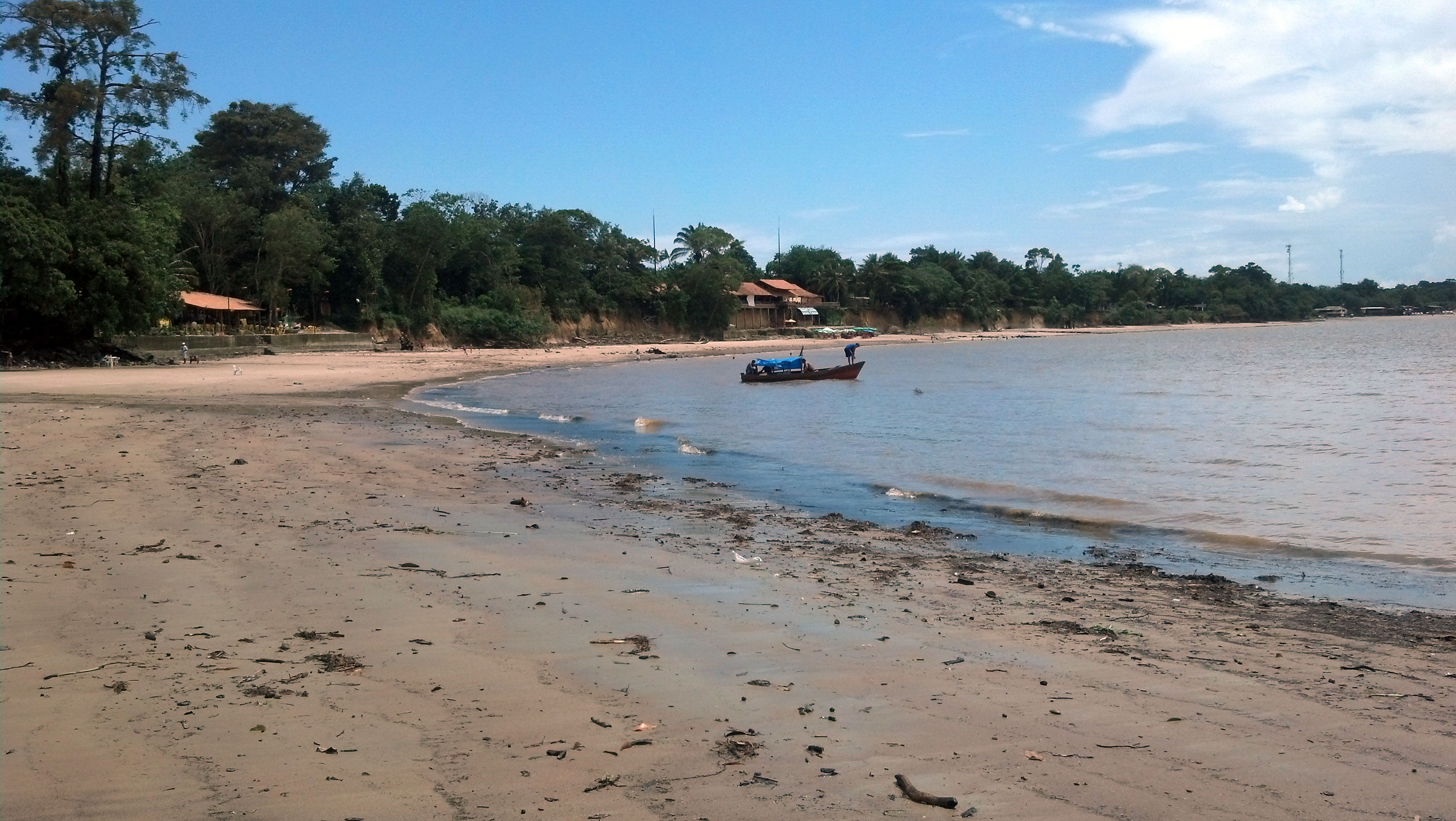
Praia do Paraiso (Paradise Beach), on the north of the island

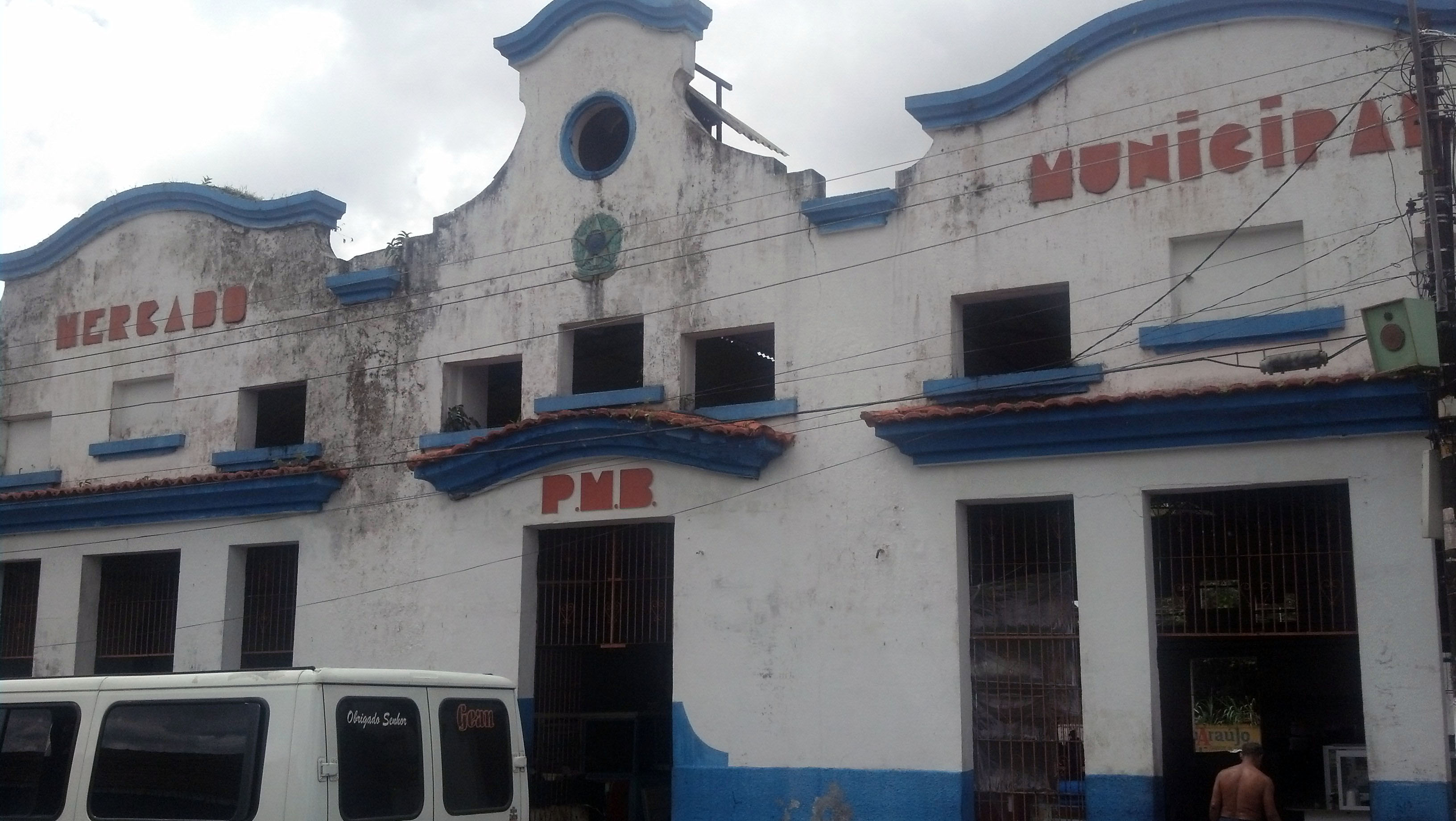
Municipal market in the town of Vila, in the southwest of the island

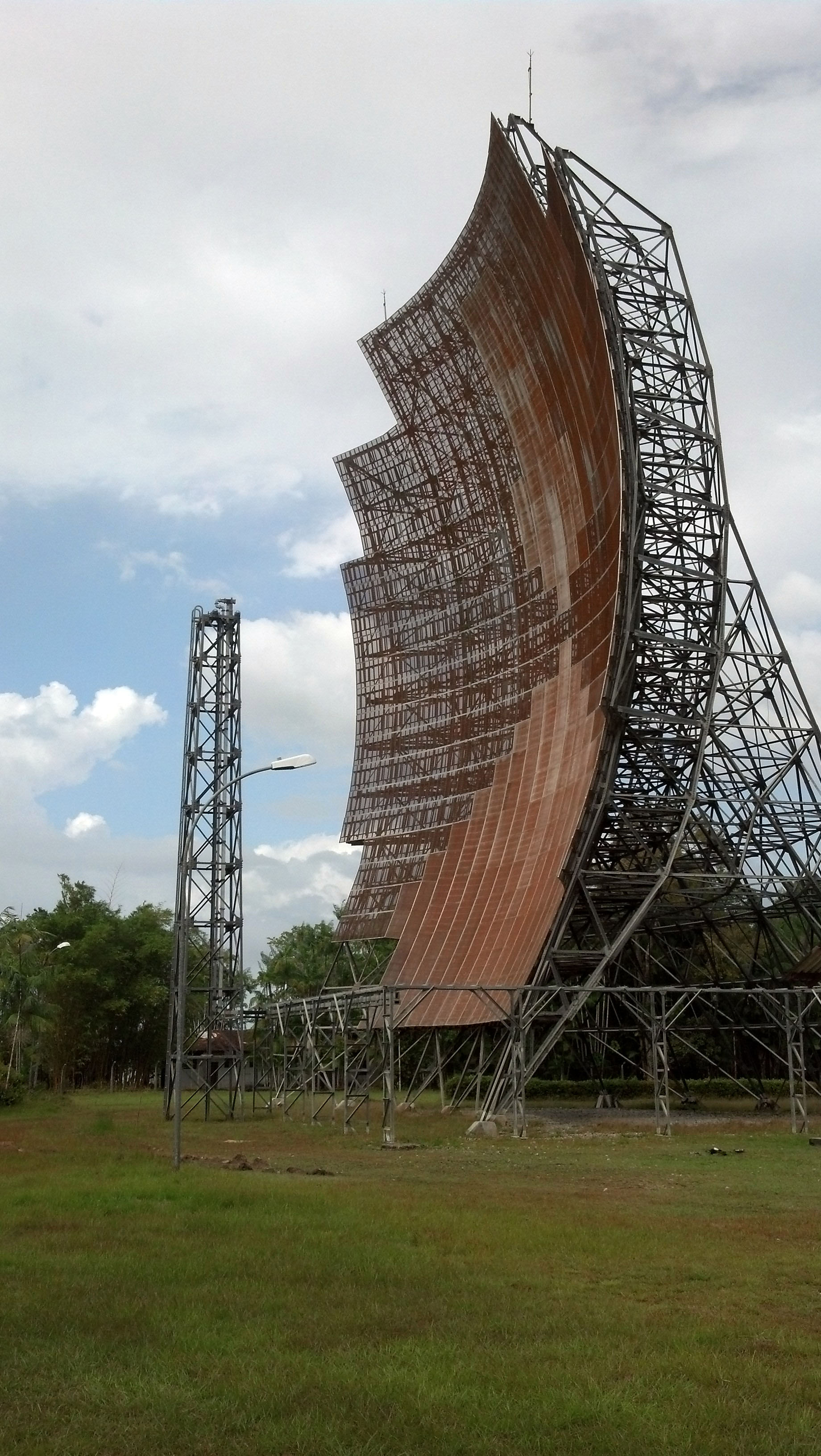
Point-to-point radio dish (retired) at Embratel facility, facing west across the Baia de Marajó
