= Hisonotus megaloplax =

Conservation status
- Near Threatened (IUCN 3.1)

Scientific classification
- Kingdom: Animalia
- Phylum: Chordata
- Class: Actinopterygii
- Order: Siluriformes
- Family: Loricariidae
- Genus: Hisonotus
- Species: H. megaloplax

Binomial name
- Hisonotus megaloplax Carvalho & Reis, 2009

Species of catfish

Hisonotus megaloplax is a species of freshwater ray-finned fish belonging to the family Loricariidae, the suckermouth armored catfishes, and the subfamily Hypoptopomatinae. the cascudinhos. This catfish is endemic to Brazil where it is found in the drainage basin of the Passo Fundo River, which is a tributary of the Uruguay River in the state of Rio Grande do Sul. This species reaches a standard length of 4.7 cm (1.9 in).

Hisonotus megaloplax was described in 2009 by Tiago P. Carvalho (of the Pontifical Xavierian University) and Roberto E. Reis (of the Pontifical Catholic University of Rio Grande do Sul) alongside three other Hisonotus species from the Uruguay River basin: H. iota, H. montanus, and H. leucophrys. The type locality of H. megaloplax is stated to be a stream known as the Arroio Caraguatá near a secondary road of BR-153 between Passo Fundo and Ipiranga do Sul in the Brazilian state of Rio Grande do Sul.
