= Hisonotus brunneus =

Conservation status
- Data Deficient (IUCN 3.1)

Scientific classification
- Kingdom: Animalia
- Phylum: Chordata
- Class: Actinopterygii
- Order: Siluriformes
- Family: Loricariidae
- Genus: Hisonotus
- Species: H. brunneus

Binomial name
- Hisonotus brunneus Carvalho & Reis, 2011

Species of catfish

Hisonotus brunneus is a species of freshwater ray-finned fish belonging to the family Loricariidae, the suckermouth armored catfishes, and the subfamily Hypoptopomatinae. the cascudinhos. This catfish is endemic to Brazil where it occurs in the Jacuí River and Lagoa dos Patos drainage basins in Rio Grande do Sul. This species reaches a standard length of 4.2 cm (1.7 in).

Hisonotus brunneus was described in 2011 by Tiago P. Carvalho (of the Pontifical Xavierian University) and Roberto E. Reis (of the Pontifical Catholic University of Rio Grande do Sul) as part of a taxonomic review of Hisonotus species in the Lagoa dos Patos system, alongside five other species: H. heterogaster, H. notopagos, H. vireo, H. carreiro, and H. prata. The type locality of H. brunneus is stated to be the Passo Novo River near the municipality of Cruz Alta in the Brazilian state of Rio Grande do Sul.
