= Hisonotus prata =

Conservation status
- Data Deficient (IUCN 3.1)

Scientific classification
- Kingdom: Animalia
- Phylum: Chordata
- Class: Actinopterygii
- Order: Siluriformes
- Family: Loricariidae
- Genus: Hisonotus
- Species: H. prata

Binomial name
- Hisonotus prata Carvalho & Reis, 2011

Species of fish

Hisonotus prata is a species of freshwater ray-finned fish belonging to the family Loricariidae, the suckermouth armored catfishes, and the subfamily Hypoptopomatinae. the cascudinhos. This catfish is endemic to Brazil where it is only know to occur in the Prata River, a tributary of the Antas River, which flows into the Taquari River, a tributary of the Jacuí River basin which is part of the Lagoa dos Patos System in the state of Rio Grande do Sul. This species reaches a standard length of 3.3 cm (1.3 in).

Hisonotus prata was described in 2011 by Tiago P. Carvalho (of the Pontifical Xavierian University) and Roberto E. Reis (of the Pontifical Catholic University of Rio Grande do Sul) as part of a taxonomic review of Hisonotus species in the Lagoa dos Patos system, alongside five other species: H. heterogaster, H. brunneus, H. vireo, H. carreiro, and H. notopagos. The type locality of H. prata is stated to be the Nova Prata, rio da Prata on Passo do Despraiado, 28°38'01"S, 51°36'51"W in Rio Grande do Sul.
