= Hisonotus vireo =

Conservation status
- Data Deficient (IUCN 3.1)

Scientific classification
- Kingdom: Animalia
- Phylum: Chordata
- Class: Actinopterygii
- Order: Siluriformes
- Family: Loricariidae
- Genus: Hisonotus
- Species: H. vireo

Binomial name
- Hisonotus vireo Carvalho & Reis, 2011

Species of fish

Hisonotus vireo is a species of freshwater ray-finned fish belonging to the family Loricariidae, the suckermouth armored catfishes, and the subfamily Hypoptopomatinae. the cascudinhos. This catfish is endemic to Brazil where it is only know to occur in Jacui River drainage in the Lagoa dos Patos system in the state of Rio Grande do Sul. The species reaches a standard length of 4 cm (1.6 in).

Hisonotus vireo was described in 2011 by Tiago P. Carvalho (of the Pontifical Xavierian University) and Roberto E. Reis (of the Pontifical Catholic University of Rio Grande do Sul) as part of a taxonomic review of Hisonotus species in the Lagoa dos Patos system, alongside five other species: H. heterogaster, H. brunneus, H. prata, H. carreiro, and H. notopagos. The type locality of H. prata is stated to be the Caraá, rio dos Sinos, a bridge 7 km (4.3 mi) north of Caraá, on the road to Fundo Quente at 29°47'S, 50°19'W, in Rio Grande do Sul.
