= Hisonotus notopagos =

Conservation status
- Least Concern (IUCN 3.1)

Scientific classification
- Kingdom: Animalia
- Phylum: Chordata
- Class: Actinopterygii
- Order: Siluriformes
- Family: Loricariidae
- Genus: Hisonotus
- Species: H. notopagos

Binomial name
- Hisonotus notopagos Carvalho & Reis, 2011

Species of catfish

Hisonotus notopagos is a species of freshwater ray-finned fish belonging to the family Loricariidae, the suckermouth armored catfishes, and the subfamily Hypoptopomatinae. the cascudinhos. This catfish is endemic to Brazil where it is found in the upper Camaquã River drainage, a tributary of the Lagoa dos Patos in the state of Rio Grande do Sul. This species reaches a standard length of 3.7 cm (1.5 in).

Hisonotus notopagos was described in 2011 by Tiago P. Carvalho (of the Pontifical Xavierian University) and Roberto E. Reis (of the Pontifical Catholic University of Rio Grande do Sul) as part of a taxonomic review of Hisonotus species in the Lagoa dos Patos system, alongside five other species: H. heterogaster, H. brunneus, H. vireo, H. carreiro, and H. prata. The type locality of H. notopagos is stated to be the Lavras do Sul, a small creek which is a tributary of the arroio das Lavras on road from Lavras do Sul to Bagé, in the Camaquã drainage at 30°50'18"S, 53°55'43"W in Rio Grande do Sul.
