= Hisonotus armatus =

Conservation status
- Least Concern (IUCN 3.1)

Scientific classification
- Kingdom: Animalia
- Phylum: Chordata
- Class: Actinopterygii
- Order: Siluriformes
- Family: Loricariidae
- Genus: Hisonotus
- Species: H. armatus

Binomial name
- Hisonotus armatus T. P. Carvalho, Lehmann A., E. H. L. Pereira & R. E. dos Reis, 2008

Species of fish

Hisonotus armatus is a species of freshwater ray-finned fish belonging to the family Loricariidae, the suckermouth armoured catfishes, and the subfamily Hypoptopomatinae, the cascudinhos. This catfish occurs widely in the darinage of the Lagoa dos Patos in Rio Grande do Sul in southeastern Brazil. H. armatus is found in rivers and streams with low to moderate flows, in clear to brown water running over sandy substrate and within marginal or submerged aquatic vegetation. This species is wholly sympatric with H. laevior. H. armatus reaches a total length of 6 cm (2.4 in).
