= AKY (disambiguation) =

AKY may refer to:

- Sittwe Airport (IATA airport code AKY), Sittwe, Rakhine State, Myanmar
- Ashland Transportation Center (AMTRAK station code AKY), Ashland, Kentucky, US
- YAK-Service (ICAO airline code AKY), a defunct Russian airline
- Air Kentucky (ICAO airline code AKY), a defunct U.S. airline
- Aka-Kol language (ISO 639 language code aky), an extinct Great Andamanese language of Middle Andaman

== See also ==
- Hisonotus aky (H. aky), a species of catfish
- Aki (disambiguation)
- Akie (disambiguation)
- Akee
- Akey
- Aquí
