= Arambaré =

Municipality of Rio Grande do Sul, Brazil

- Municipality
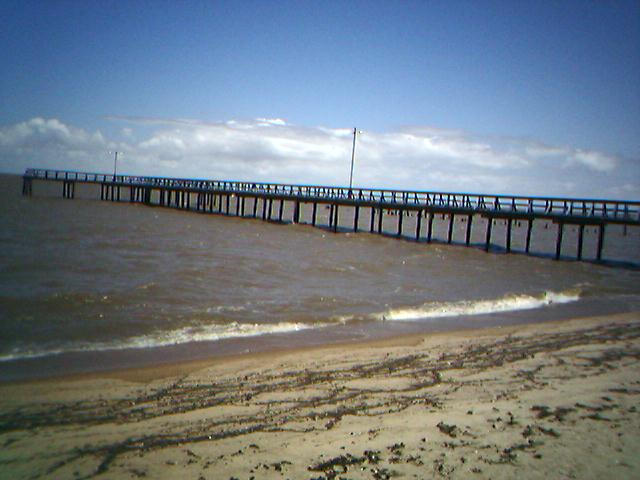
- Beach in Arambaré

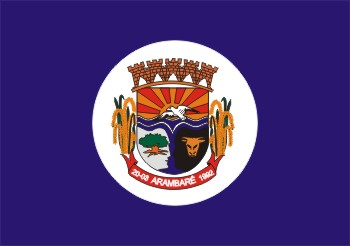
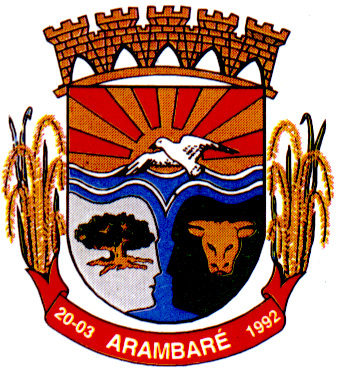
- Flag Coat of arms
- Nickname: Capital das Figueiras
- Coordinates: 30°54′54″S 51°29′52″W
- Country: Brazil
- State: Rio Grande do Sul
- Mesoregion: Metropolitana de Porto Alegre
- Microregion: Camaquã
- Founded: March 20, 1992

Government
  - Mayor: Joselena Maria Becker Scherer (PDT)

Area
  - Total: 519.124 km^{2} (200.435 sq mi)
- Elevation: 5 m (16 ft)

Population (2020)
  - Total: 3,562
  - Density: 6.862/km^{2} (17.77/sq mi)
- Time zone: UTC−3 (BRT)
- HDI: 0.743
- GDP: R$ 39,253,000
- GDP per capita: R$8,770.00

Arambaré (Portuguese: [a.ɾɐ̃.baˈɾɛ]) is a municipality in the state of Rio Grande do Sul, Brazil. It is bordered by Tapes on the north, Camaquã on the west and south, and Lagoa dos Patos on the east. It is at km 396 of the BR-116, 33 km from Camaquã. It is 156 km from Porto Alegre.

Arambaré, in Guarani, means "priest who shines light." Its origin was the Tape people, who populated the Lagoa dos Patos coast. Later the place was known as Barra do Velhaco and Paraguaçu. Dunas da Lua de Natal and Prainha are two of the baths found in the city.

In summer, tourism is the most important industry. The rural area is known for its rice and livestock.

The city is well known for its Carnaval, when thousands of tourists visit.

== History ==
Arambaré was initially called "Barra do Velhaco" because it was located at the mouth of the Arroio Velhaco.

In 1682, Spanish Jesuits took advantage of the fact that the bandeirantes were busy extracting gold and precious stones.

In this locality, known since colonial times in 1714, indigenous people with special customs lived there, adorning themselves with the feathers of the birds they raised, which is why they were called "Patos" (Ducks).

They were the Arachas people, not a tribe, also known as Arachanes or Arachãs, meaning "those who fought against the Charrúas."

In the neighboring municipality of Sertão Santana, there was a yerba mate reduction (mission settlement).

In the municipality of Tapes, there was also a cattle ranch at Morro da Formiga, on the right bank of the Itapoá channel (a name meaning "round stone").

In 1752, these reductions were destroyed by the Portuguese army.

The Jesuit cattle remained as wild and feral livestock scattered throughout the region.

Around 1763, Azorean couples who migrated south settled on the left bank of the Guaíba estuary and the right bank of the Lagoa dos Patos, establishing farms and charqueadas (meat-salting plants) up to the Rio Camaquã.

The rivers and the lagoon acted as natural fences, creating favorable conditions for a large herd known today as the "gado velhaco" (rogue cattle). The cattle were called "velhaco" or "zaino," meaning "one who acts with deceit and cunning; clever, crafty, astute."

Thus, the region became known as "Barra do Velhaco" due to its location at the mouth of the Arroio Velhaco.

In 1938, it was renamed "Paraguassu," which in Tupi means:

"Big river" (long) (pará + guaçu); "The big headdress" (paraguá + açu); The name of an indigenous woman, daughter of the Tupinambá chief, who married Diogo Alvares, "Caramuru," in 1531, receiving the baptismal name "Catarina." In 1945, it adopted the name "Arambaré."

In a poetic (non-orthographic) translation, it means "The priest who spreads light."

Arambaré in Tupi means: "mist, fog."

Since then, the inhabitants of the then-district of Arambaré united in pursuit of development through agriculture, livestock, and especially its great tourism potential and natural beauty. The locality was emancipated on March 20, 1992, from the municipality of Camaquã and part of Tapes.

== Economy ==
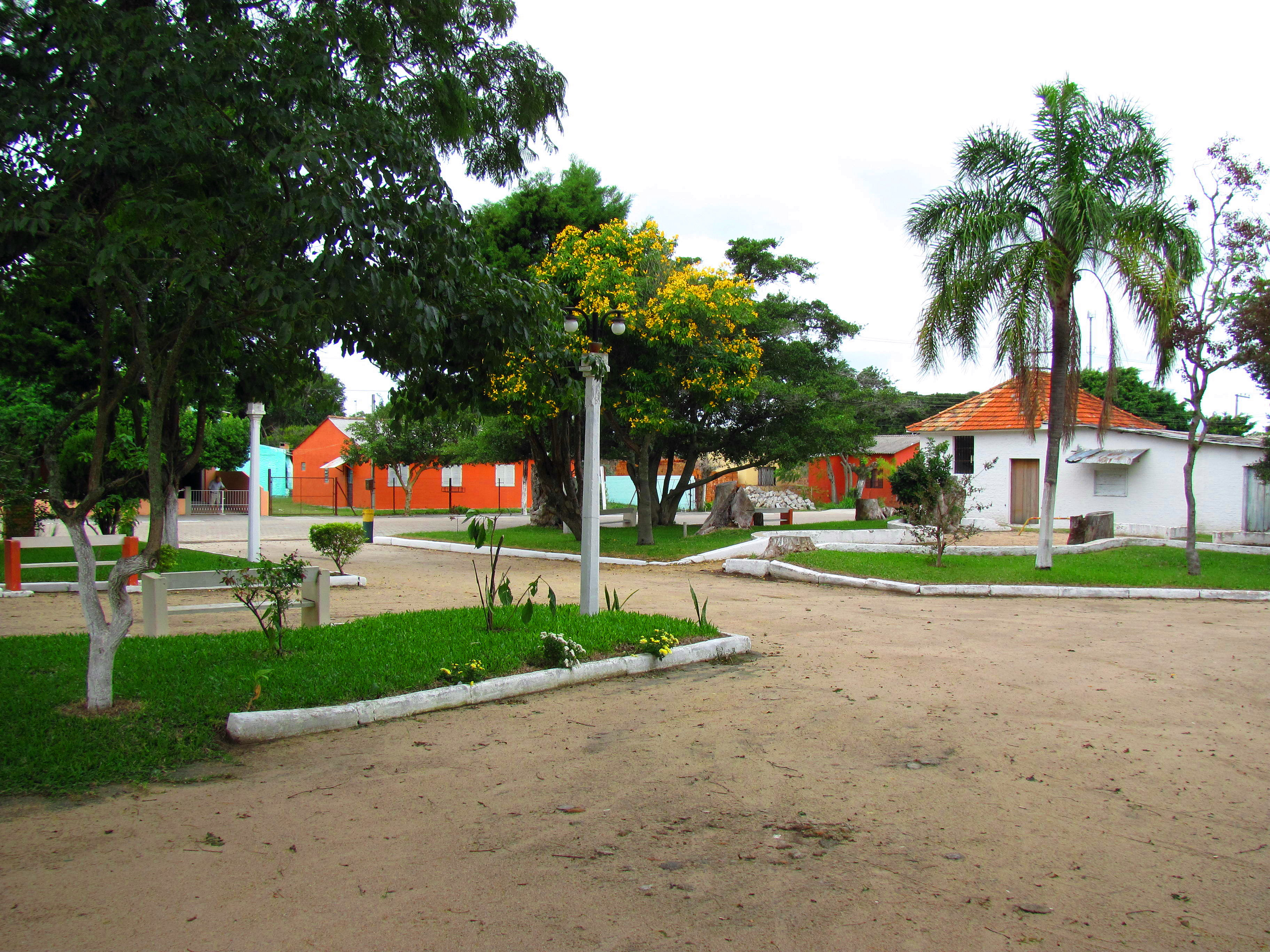
João Carlos Augusto Monser Square, located in front of the Nossa Senhora dos Navegantes Mother Church.

During the summer season, tourism boosts commerce in the municipality. In rural areas, the cultivation of rice and soybeans and cattle farming stand out.

=== Tourism ===
The city is famous for its Carnival, where thousands of tourists visit, making it one of the best carnivals in the southern region of the state. In summer, the city, bathed by the Lagoa dos Patos, is filled with swimmers from all over the state.

== Geography ==
=== Climate ===
In summer, the maximum temperature reaches 40 °C, and the minimum is 20 °C. In winter, the winds from the lagoon make the municipality very cold.

=== Hydrography ===
The municipality has only one significant river, the Arroio Velhaco, whose mouth flows into the Lagoa dos Patos in the northern region of Arambaré.

The river's waters have been important for irrigating rice plantations in the region. In fact, much of the other natural watercourses in the municipality have been altered for the construction of irrigation channels.

To the south, in the district of Santa Rita do Sul, there is a small lagoon, known as Lagoa do Graxaim.

== Biodiversity ==
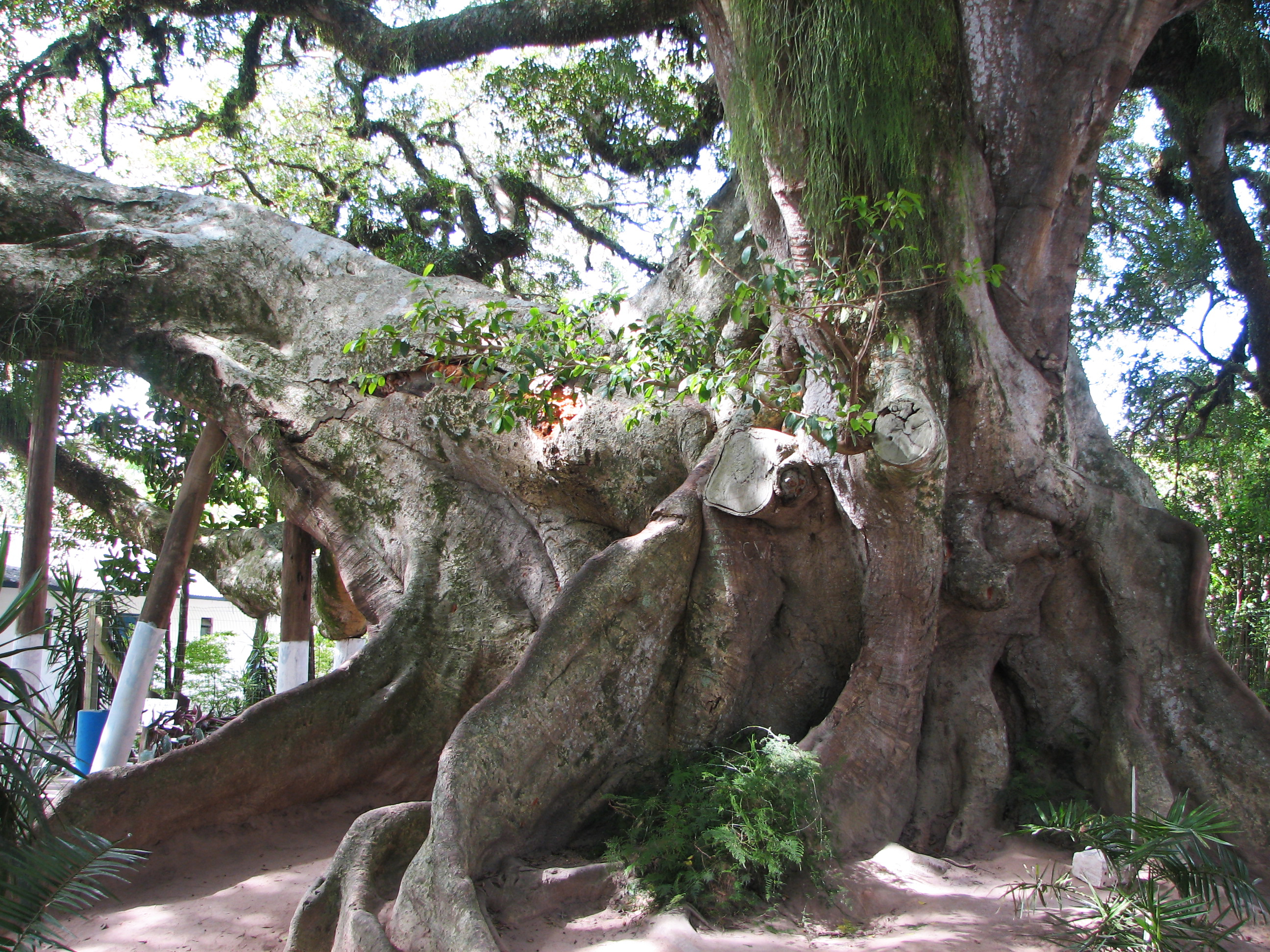
The Figueira da Paz, photographed in February 2017, showing a crack in one of its branches. Large wooden beams support the tree.

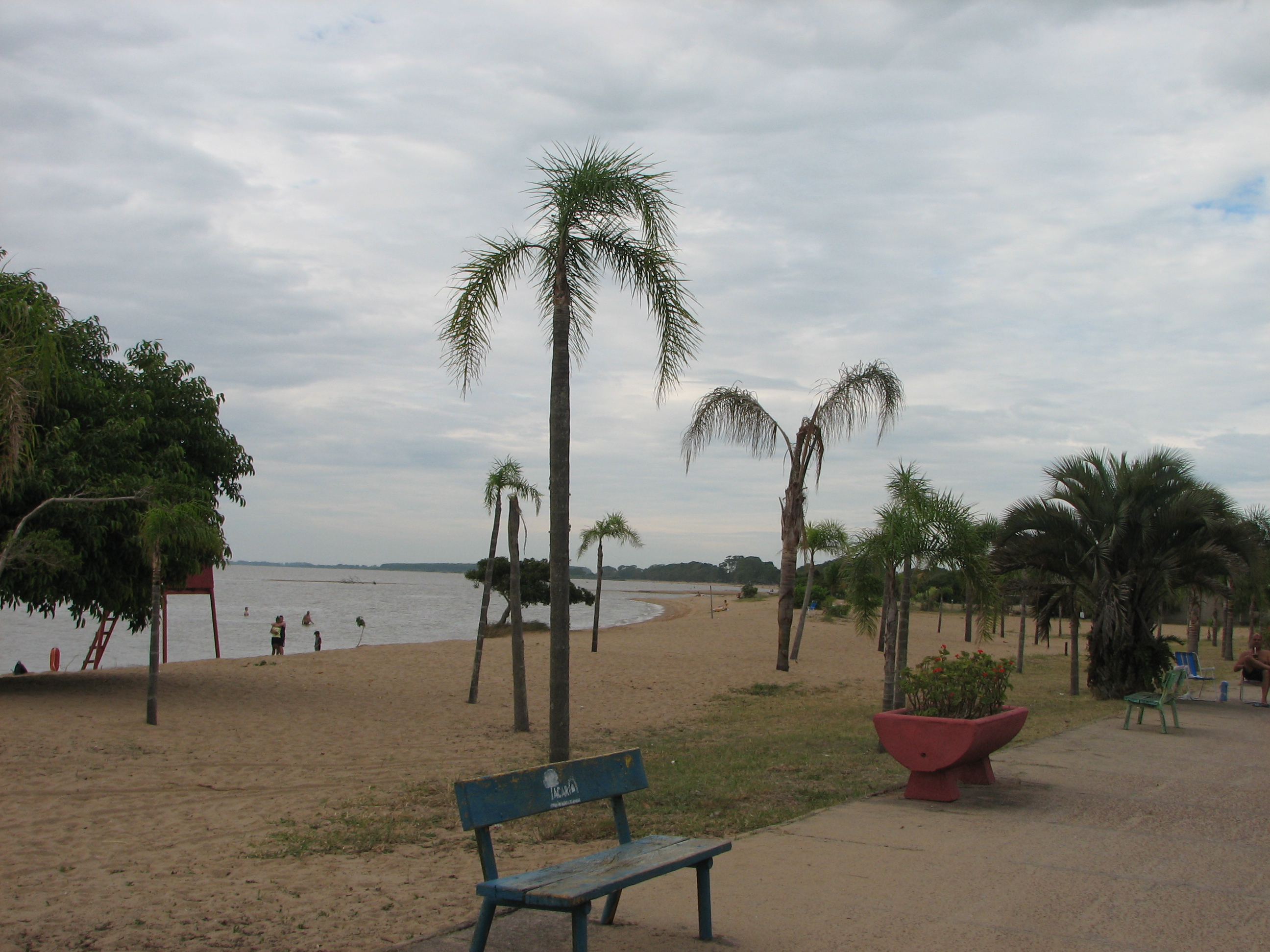
Caramuru neighborhood beach

The municipality naturally features ecosystems of the Atlantic Forest, including dunes along the Lagoa dos Patos, where coastal vegetation known as restinga grows.

The abundance of fig trees in the municipality has also made Arambaré regionally known as the "Capital of Fig Trees", even featuring a large fig tree as the city's symbol.

=== Figueira da Paz ===
Arambaré preserves a heritage of the state of Rio Grande do Sul, the largest fig tree in the state, the Figueira da Paz, with approximately 141 meters in perimeter. Its canopy spans a radius of 50 meters, and the trunk's circumference is 12 meters. Estimated to be between 400 and 700 years old, it stands in the city center, surrounded by benches and illuminated at night, embodying the spirit of coexistence with nature.

The fig tree is native to the Atlantic Forest region, scientifically named Ficus organensis, contributing to the beautiful natural landscape along the Costa Doce. In Arambaré, the fig tree's image symbolizes the municipality's political and administrative emancipation. According to oral history, the Arachas indigenous people once lived near this area, surviving on hunting and fishing in the Lagoa dos Patos. Legend says an indigenous woman named "Justa" took shelter under the fig tree and remained there until her death.

In 1998, the municipal administration, as part of the "Games of Peace" celebrated in several countries, inaugurated a plaque commemorating the event, naming the space "Figueira da Paz" (Peace Fig Tree).

Fig trees are protected by state law, making them immune to cutting, as they host various flora and fauna species. Their fruits serve as food for many bird species and provide shelter for epiphytic plants like orchids and bromeliads.

Currently, the fig tree faces a delicate structural issue. A crack in one of its main branches has put authorities in a difficult situation. IBAMA declined responsibility, passing the issue to FEPAM, the state environmental agency. Pruning seems like an obvious solution, but it could destabilize the tree, causing it to collapse. Another option would be filling the cracks with cement to prevent moisture from further rotting the branch.

=== Arambaré Lizard ===
In 2003, a group of Brazilian scientists discovered a new species of lizard inhabiting the dunes of the region and the municipality, which is endangered. It was given the scientific name Liolaemus arambarensis in honor of the municipality. Its habitat, the coastal dunes on the western side of Lagoa dos Patos, has been preserved, ensuring the species' survival.

== Radio Stations ==
- Rádio Comunitária Farol FM

== See also ==
- List of municipalities in Rio Grande do Sul
