= Hisonotus leucophrys =

Conservation status
- Data Deficient (IUCN 3.1)

Scientific classification
- Kingdom: Animalia
- Phylum: Chordata
- Class: Actinopterygii
- Order: Siluriformes
- Family: Loricariidae
- Genus: Hisonotus
- Species: H. leucophrys

Binomial name
- Hisonotus leucophrys Carvalho & Reis, 2009

Species of catfish

Hisonotus leucophrys is a species of freshwater ray-finned fish belonging to the family Loricariidae, the suckermouth armored catfishes, and the subfamily Hypoptopomatinae. the cascudinhos. This catfish is endemic to Brazil where it is found in the Ariranha, Rancho Grande and Guarita, in the upper Uruguay River basin, in the states of Santa Catarina and Rio Grande do Sul. This species reaches a standard length of 4.2 cm (1.7 in).

Hisonotus leucophrys was described in 2009 by Tiago P. Carvalho (of the Pontifical Xavierian University) and Roberto E. Reis (of the Pontifical Catholic University of Rio Grande do Sul) alongside three other Hisonotus species from the Uruguay River basin: H. montanus, H. megaloplax, and H. iota. The type locality of H. iota is stated to be the Rio Ariranhas on bridge of highway SC-466, in the Uruguay River basin at 27°04'17"S. 52°20'34"W, Xavantina, Santa Catarina.
