= Hisonotus heterogaster =

Conservation status
- Data Deficient (IUCN 3.1)

Scientific classification
- Kingdom: Animalia
- Phylum: Chordata
- Class: Actinopterygii
- Order: Siluriformes
- Family: Loricariidae
- Genus: Hisonotus
- Species: H. heterogaster

Binomial name
- Hisonotus heterogaster Carvalho & Reis, 2011

Species of catfish

Hisonotus heterogaster is a species of freshwater ray-finned fish belonging to the family Loricariidae, the suckermouth armored catfishes, and the subfamily Hypoptopomatinae. the cascudinhos. This catfish is endemic to Brazil where it is known only from the type locality, a stream which is a tributary of the Soturno River, in the western Jacuí River basin, in the municipality of Júlio de Castilhos in Rio Grande do Sul. This species reaches a standard length of 4.3 cm (1.7 in).

Hisonotus heterogaster was described in 2011 by Tiago P. Carvalho (of the Pontifical Xavierian University) and Roberto E. Reis (of the Pontifical Catholic University of Rio Grande do Sul) as part of a taxonomic review of Hisonotus species in the Lagoa dos Patos system, alongside five other species: H. notopagos, H. brunneus, H. vireo, H. carreiro, and H. prata. The type locality of H. heterogaster is stated to be a stream known as the Arroio Felício near the road between Júlio de Castilhos and Nova Palma.
