= Hisonotus iota =

Conservation status
- Data Deficient (IUCN 3.1)

Scientific classification
- Kingdom: Animalia
- Phylum: Chordata
- Class: Actinopterygii
- Order: Siluriformes
- Family: Loricariidae
- Genus: Hisonotus
- Species: H. iota

Binomial name
- Hisonotus iota Carvalho & Reis, 2009

Species of fish

Hisonotus iota is a species of freshwater ray-finned fish belonging to the family Loricariidae, the suckermouth armored catfishes, and the subfamily Hypoptopomatinae. the cascudinhos. This catfish is endemic to Brazil where it is known only from the type locality, a stream which is a tributary of the Uruguay River in the state of Santa Catarina. This species reaches a standard length of 3.3 cm (1.3 in).

Hisonotus iota was described in 2009 by Tiago P. Carvalho (of the Pontifical Xavierian University) and Roberto E. Reis (of the Pontifical Catholic University of Rio Grande do Sul) alongside three other Hisonotus species from the Uruguay River basin: H. montanus, H. megaloplax, and H. leucophrys. The type locality of H. iota is stated to be the Chapecó River near the road between Coronel Freitas and Quilombo in the Brazilian state of Santa Catarina.
