= Akie (given name) =

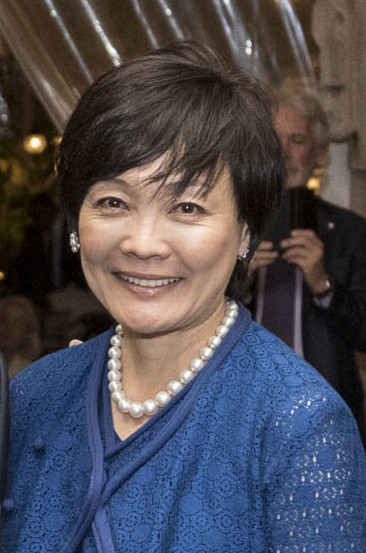
- Akie Abe, Japanese socialite, radio personality
- Pronunciation: akʲie (IPA)
- Gender: Female

Origin
- Origin: Japanese
- Meaning: Different meanings depending on the kanji used

Akie is a feminine Japanese given name.

== Written forms ==
Akie can be written using many different combinations of kanji characters. Here are some examples:

- 明江, "bright, creek"
- 明恵, "bright, grace"
- 明絵, "bright, drawing"
- 明枝, "bright, branch"
- 明慧, "bright, wise"
- 昭江, "clear, creek"
- 昭恵, "clear, grace"
- 昭絵, "clear, drawing"
- 昭枝, "clear, branch"
- 昭慧, "clear, wise"
- 秋江, "autumn, creek"
- 秋恵, "autumn, grace"
- 秋絵, "autumn, drawing"
- 晶江, "sparkle, creek"
- 晶恵, "sparkle, grace"
- 晶絵, "sparkle, drawing"
- 章慧, "chapter, wise"
- 章恵, "chapter, grace"
- 章絵, "chapter, drawing"
- 彰江, "clear, creek"
- 晃慧, "clear, wise"
- 朗枝, "clear, branch"
- 亜紀恵, "Asia, chronicle, wise"

The name can also be written in hiragana あきえ or katakana アキエ.

== Notable people with the name ==
- Akie Abe (安倍 昭恵; born 1962), Japanese socialite, radio personality and wife of Shinzō Abe, Prime Minister of Japan
- Akie Asaka (佐藤 秋恵; born 1956), Japanese comedian
- Akie Dagogo Fubara, Nigerian banker, businessman, politician, and philanthropist
- Akie Hanai (花井 瑛絵; born 1999), Japanese freestyle wrestler
- Akie Kotabe (born 1980), American actor
- Akie Noah, Sierra Leoneon footballer
- Akie Suzuki (鈴木 あきえ; born 1987), is a Japanese tarento
- Akie Uegaki (植垣 暁恵; born 1984), Japanese handball player
- Akie Yoshizawa (吉沢 秋絵; born 1968), Japanese idol, singer and actress
