= Hisonotus nigricauda =

Conservation status
- Least Concern (IUCN 3.1)

Scientific classification
- Kingdom: Animalia
- Phylum: Chordata
- Class: Actinopterygii
- Order: Siluriformes
- Family: Loricariidae
- Genus: Hisonotus
- Species: H. nigricauda

Binomial name
- Hisonotus nigricauda (Boulenger, 1891)

Synonyms
- Otocinclus nigricauda Boulenger, 1891; Microlepidogaster nigricauda (Boulenger, 1891)

Species of catfish

Hisonotus nigricauda is a species of freshwater ray-finned fish belonging to the family Loricariidae, the suckermouth armored catfishes, and the subfamily Hypoptopomatinae. the cascudinhos. This catfish is found in the drainage basins of the Lagoa dos Patos and the Uruguay River in Argentina, Brazil and Uruguay. In the Lagoa dos Patos Lagoon system, H. nigricauda is found mainly in the lower reaches of the tributaries near to the lagoon, and it is not found in the upper reachess of the Jacuí River basin. In the Uruguay River basin it is commoner in the lower reaches, although it can be found in the upper parts of the Negro River, Quaraí River and Ibicuí River. This species reaches a standard length of 6.0 cm (2.4 in).
