= Hisonotus charrua =

Conservation status
- Least Concern (IUCN 3.1)

Scientific classification
- Kingdom: Animalia
- Phylum: Chordata
- Class: Actinopterygii
- Order: Siluriformes
- Family: Loricariidae
- Genus: Hisonotus
- Species: H. charrua

Binomial name
- Hisonotus charrua Almirón, Azpelicueta, Casciotta & Litz, 2006

Species of fish

Hisonotus charrua is a species of freshwater ray-finned fish belonging to the family Loricariidae, the suckermouth armored catfishes, and the subfamily Hypoptopomatinae. the cascudinhos. This catfish is found in Argentina, Brazil and Uruguay in the lower and middle parts of the Uruguay River drainage system, the Lagoa dos Patos basin and in some coastal rivers of Uruguay. This species reaches a standard length of 3.6 cm (1.4 in).
