= Hisonotus leucofrenatus =

Conservation status
- Least Concern (IUCN 3.1)

Scientific classification
- Kingdom: Animalia
- Phylum: Chordata
- Class: Actinopterygii
- Order: Siluriformes
- Family: Loricariidae
- Genus: Hisonotus
- Species: H. leucofrenatus

Binomial name
- Hisonotus leucofrenatus (A. Miranda-Ribeiro, 1908)

Synonyms
- Otocinclus leucofrenatus A. Miranda-Ribeiro, 1908; Microlepidogaster leucofrenatus (A. Miranda-Ribeiro, 1908)

Species of catfish

Hisonotus leucofrenatus is a species of freshwater ray-finned fish belonging to the family Loricariidae, the suckermouth armored catfishes, and the subfamily Hypoptopomatinae. the cascudinhos. This catfish is endemic to Brazil, where it occurs in the states of Paraná, Rio Grande do Sul, Santa Catarina and São Paulo. Its distribution extends from the coastal plain of the Lagoa dos Patos in Rio Grande do Sul and in the Atlantic coastal drainages from the Ribeira de Iguape river basin south to the Tramandaí river system. H. leucofrenatus reaches a standard length of 6 cm (2.4 in).
