= Hisonotus thayeri =

Scientific classification
- Kingdom: Animalia
- Phylum: Chordata
- Class: Actinopterygii
- Order: Siluriformes
- Family: Loricariidae
- Genus: Hisonotus
- Species: H. thayeri

Binomial name
- Hisonotus thayeri Martins & Langeani, 2016

Species of catfish

Hisonotus thayeri is a species of freshwater ray-finned fish belonging to the family Loricariidae, the suckermouth armored catfishes, and the subfamily Hypoptopomatinae. the cascudinhos. This catfish is endemic to Brazil where occurs in the southeast and is found in the basins of the Macaé River, the Itabapoana River, the Paraíba do Sul River, the Itapemirim River, the Doce River, the Novo River, the Benevente River, and Lagoa Feia in . The species reaches a standard lengthof 4.2 cm (1.7 in). H. thayeri was formerly considered to be conspecific with Hisonotus notatus, being described as its own species in 2016. The specific name honors the Thayer Expedition, on which this species was first collected.
