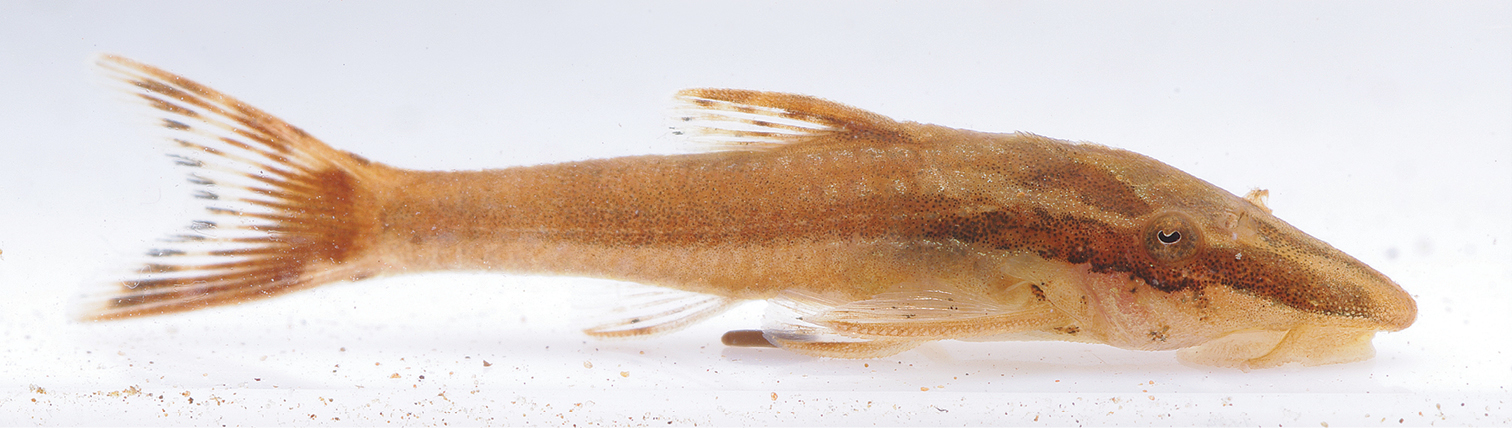
- Hisonotus acuen

Scientific classification
- Kingdom: Animalia
- Phylum: Chordata
- Class: Actinopterygii
- Order: Siluriformes
- Family: Loricariidae
- Subfamily: Otothyrinae; Chiachio, C. de Oliveira & Montoya-Burgos, 2008

Genera
- Corumbataia Britski, 1997; Curculionichthys Roxo, Silva, Orrego & Oliveira, 2015; Epactionotus Reis & Schaefer, 1998; Eurycheilichthys Reis & Schaefer, 1993; Hisonotus Eigenmann & Eigenmann, 1889; Microlepidogaster Eigenmann & Eigenmann, 1889; Otothyris Myers, 1927; Otothyropsis Ribeiro, Carvalho & Melo, 2005; Parotocinclus Eigenmann & Eigenmann, 1889; Pseudotocinclus Nichols, 1919; Pseudotothyris Britski & Garavello, 1984; Schizolecis Britski & Garavello, 1984

= Otothyrinae =

Subfamily of fishes

Otothyrinae is a subfamily of South American catfishes of the family Loricariidae. Alternatively it is treated as a tribe in Hypoptopomatinae.
