= Hisonotus francirochai =

Conservation status
- Least Concern (IUCN 3.1)

Scientific classification
- Kingdom: Animalia
- Phylum: Chordata
- Class: Actinopterygii
- Division: Teleostei
- Order: Siluriformes
- Family: Loricariidae
- Genus: Hisonotus
- Species: H. francirochai

Binomial name
- Hisonotus francirochai (Ihering, 1928)

Synonyms
- Otocinclus francirochai Ihering, 1928; Microlepidogaster francirochai (Ihering, 1928)

Species of catfish

Hisonotus francirochaiis a species of freshwater ray-finned fish belonging to the family Loricariidae, the suckermouth armored catfishes, and the subfamily Hypoptopomatinae. the cascudinhos. This catfish is endemic to Brazil where it is found in the Rio Grande, a tributary of the upper Paraná River, in the states of Goiás, Mato Grosso do Sul, Minas Gerais, Paraná and São Paulo. This species reaches a standard length of 3.8 cm (1.5 in). Its specific name honours the Brazilian psychiatrist Francisco Franco da Rocha, who founded the Hospital Psiquiátrico do Juqueri in the Região Metropolitana de São Paulo, "on the occasion of his jubilee".
