= Hisonotus devidei =

Conservation status
- Data Deficient (IUCN 3.1)

Scientific classification
- Kingdom: Animalia
- Phylum: Chordata
- Class: Actinopterygii
- Order: Siluriformes
- Family: Loricariidae
- Genus: Hisonotus
- Species: H. devidei

Binomial name
- Hisonotus devidei Roxo, G. S. C. Silva & B. F. Melo, 2018

Species of catfish

Hisonotus devidei is a species of freshwater ray-finned fish belonging to the family Loricariidae, the suckermouth armored catfishes, and the subfamily Hypoptopomatinae. the cascudinhos. This catfish is endemic to Brazil where it is known only from its type locality at Catolé Creek, a tributary of the Pandeiros River in the São Francisco River basin at the municipality of Bonito de Minas in the northern part of the state of Minas Gerais. This species reaches a standard length of 3.2 cm (1.3 in). H. devidei was first formally described in 2018 by F. F. Roxo, G. S. C. Silva and B. F. Melo, and the specificname honours their friend and colleague Renato Devidé, who collected the holotype.
