= Akie =

Akie may refer to:

- Akie people
- Akie language
- Akie (given name)
