= Hisonotus ringueleti =

Conservation status
- Least Concern (IUCN 3.1)

Scientific classification
- Kingdom: Animalia
- Phylum: Chordata
- Class: Actinopterygii
- Order: Siluriformes
- Family: Loricariidae
- Genus: Hisonotus
- Species: H. ringueleti

Binomial name
- Hisonotus ringueleti Aquino, Schaefer & Miquelarena, 2001

Synonyms
- Hisonotus candombe Casciotta, Azpelicueta, Almirón & Litz, 2006

Species of fish

Hisonotus ringueleti is a species of freshwater ray-finned fish belonging to the family Loricariidae, the suckermouth armored catfishes, and the subfamily Hypoptopomatinae. the cascudinhos. This catfish occurs in the Uruguay River basin in the Brazilian state of Rio Grande do Sul and in Uruguay. It is found mainly in vegetated areas inhabited by species belonging to the plant genera Ludwigia and Potamogeton, among others. It occurs in both slow and fast-flowing clear creek environments with a substrate of stones, mud, or gravel. The species reaches a standard length of 4.4 cm (1.7 in). The specific name, ringueleti, honors the Argentine zoologist Raúl A. Ringuelet who wrote the influential Los Peces de Agua Dulce de la República Argentina.
