= Hisonotus taimensis =

Conservation status
- Least Concern (IUCN 3.1)

Scientific classification
- Kingdom: Animalia
- Phylum: Chordata
- Class: Actinopterygii
- Order: Siluriformes
- Family: Loricariidae
- Genus: Hisonotus
- Species: H. taimensis

Binomial name
- Hisonotus taimensis (Buckup, 1981)

Synonyms
- Microlepidogaster taimensis Buckup, 1981

Species of fish

Hisonotus taimensis is a species of freshwater ray-finned fish belonging to the family Loricariidae, the suckermouth armored catfishes, and the subfamily Hypoptopomatinae. the cascudinhos. This catfish is endemic to Brazil, where it occurs in the Taim wetland region, located between the Mirim and Mangueira Lagoons, in the state of Rio Grande do Sul. This species reaches standard length of 6.6 cm (2.6 in)
