= Hisonotus yasi =

Conservation status
- Least Concern (IUCN 3.1)

Scientific classification
- Kingdom: Animalia
- Phylum: Chordata
- Class: Actinopterygii
- Order: Siluriformes
- Family: Loricariidae
- Genus: Hisonotus
- Species: H. yasi

Binomial name
- Hisonotus yasi (Almirón, Azpelicueta & Casciotta, 2004)

Synonyms
- Epactionotus yasi Almirón, Azpelicueta & Casciotta, 2004

Species of armored catfish

Hisonotus yasi is a species of freshwater ray-finned fish belonging to the family Loricariidae, the suckermouth armoured catfishes, and the subfamily Hypoptopomatinae, the cascudinhos. This catfish is found in the drainage system of the Iguazu River in Argentina and Brazil.
