= Hisonotus hungy =

Conservation status
- Endangered (IUCN 3.1)

Scientific classification
- Kingdom: Animalia
- Phylum: Chordata
- Class: Actinopterygii
- Order: Siluriformes
- Family: Loricariidae
- Genus: Hisonotus
- Species: H. hungy

Binomial name
- Hisonotus hungy Azpelicueta, Almirón, Casciotta & Koerber, 2007

Species of catfish

Hisonotus hungy is a species of freshwater ray-finned fish belonging to the family Loricariidae, the suckermouth armored catfishes, and the subfamily Hypoptopomatinae. the cascudinhos. This catfish is endemic to Argentina where it occurs in the arroyo of Tirica, which is part of the Paraná River basin in Misiones. It is found in vegetated parts of Tirica (including those populated with introduced conifers as well as those with native vegetation) and reaches a standard length 4.2 cm (1.7 in).
