= Hisonotus depressicauda =

Conservation status
- Least Concern (IUCN 3.1)

Scientific classification
- Kingdom: Animalia
- Phylum: Chordata
- Class: Actinopterygii
- Order: Siluriformes
- Family: Loricariidae
- Genus: Hisonotus
- Species: H. depressicauda

Binomial name
- Hisonotus depressicauda (A. Miranda-Ribeiro, 1918)

Synonyms
- Otocinclus depressicauda A. Miranda Ribeiro, 1918; Microlepidogaster depressicauda (A. Miranda Ribeiro, 1918)

Species of catfish

Hisonotus depressicauda is a species of freshwater ray-finned fish belonging to the family Loricariidae, the suckermouth armored catfishes, and the subfamily Hypoptopomatinae. the cascudinhos. This catfish is endemic to Brazil where it occurs in the Tietê River and upper Paraná River basins in the states of Mato Grosso do Sul, Minas Gerais, Paraná, Santa Catarina and São Paulo. This species reaches a standard length of 5 cm (2.0 in).
