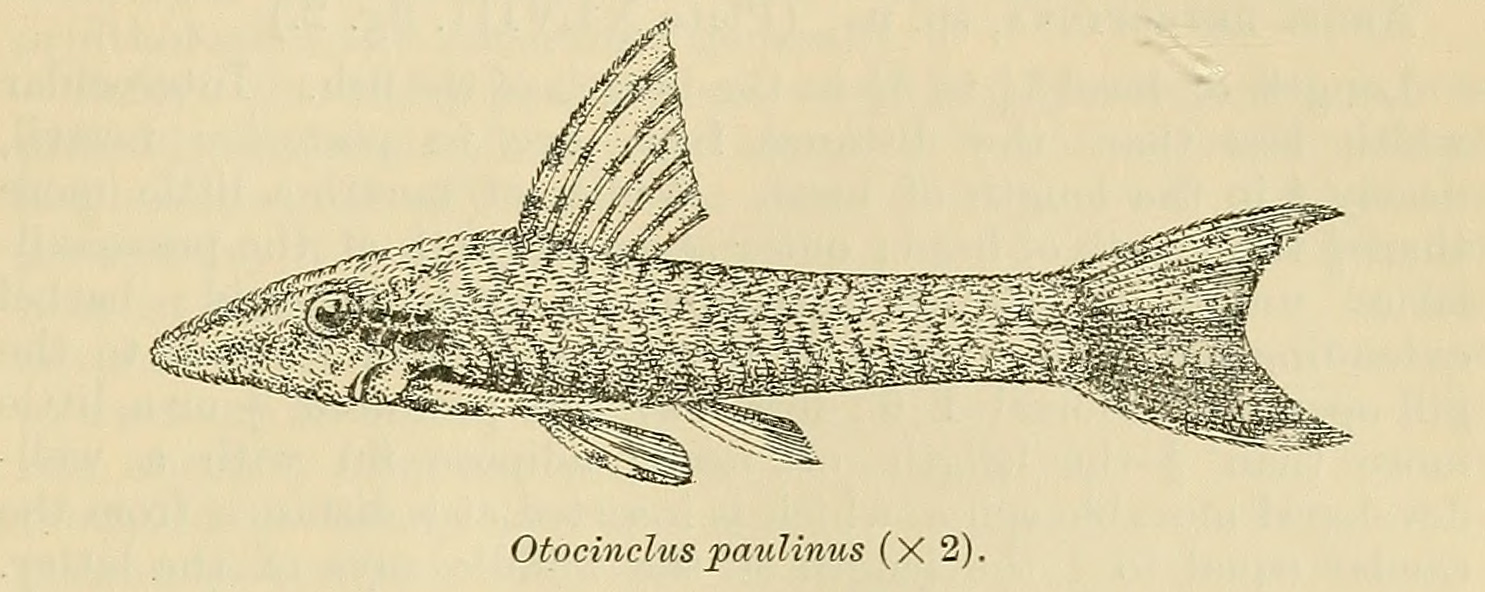
- Hisonotus paulinus

Scientific classification
- Kingdom: Animalia
- Phylum: Chordata
- Class: Actinopterygii
- Order: Siluriformes
- Family: Loricariidae
- Subfamily: Hypoptopomatinae
- Genus: Hisonotus; C. H. Eigenmann & R. S. Eigenmann, 1889

Type species
- Hisonotus notatus C. H. Eigenmann & R. S. Eigenmann, 1889

= Hisonotus =

Genus of fishes

Hisonotus is a genus of freshwater ray-finned fishes belonging to the family Loricariidae, the mailed catfishes, and the subfamily Hypoptopomatinae, the cascudinhos. The catfishes in this genus are found in South America. Species of Hisonotus and Curculionichthys are the only representatives of the proposed subfamily Otothyrinae, sometgimes regarded as the tribe Otothyrini, having serrae on the posterior edge of the pectoral fin spine. These species are small fishes, generally found in small fast flowing streams, where they grasp to the branches and leaves of aquatic or subaquatic plants. The species of this genus mostly occur in Atlantic coastal streams of southern Brazil and the Paraguay-Paraná system of southern South America. They are also distributed in the Río de La Plata basin and coastal rivers of southeastern Brazil.

== Taxonomy ==
Hisonotus and Microlepidogaster have, until recently, been considered as synonymous, although they are now recognized as separate and valid taxa. In the most recent phylogenetic hypotheses, both Hisonotus and Parotocinclus are relatively basal taxa within the Otothyrini clade. This clade is sometimes treated as tribe within the subfamily Hypoptopomatinae, although Eschmeyer's Catalog of Fishes does not recognize tribes.

== Species ==
Hisonotus contains the following valid species:

- Hisonotus aky (Azpelicueta, Casciotta, Almirón & Koerber, 2004)
- Hisonotus alberti Roxo, G. S. C. Silva, Waltz & J. E. García-Melo, 2016
- Hisonotus armatus T. P. Carvalho, Lehmann A., E. H. L. Pereira & R. E. dos Reis, 2008
- Hisonotus bocaiuva Roxo, G. S. C. Silva, C. de Oliveira & Zawadzki, 2013
- Hisonotus brunneus T. P. Carvalho & R. E. dos Reis, 2011
- Hisonotus carreiro T. P. Carvalho & R. E. dos Reis, 2011
- Hisonotus charrua Almirón, Azpelicueta, Casciotta & Litz, 2006
- Hisonotus depressicauda (A. Miranda-Ribeiro, 1918)
- Hisonotus devidei (Roxo, G. S. C. Silva & B. F. Melo, 2018)
- Hisonotus francirochai (Ihering (pt), 1928)
- Hisonotus heterogaster T. P. Carvalho & R. E. dos Reis, 2011
- Hisonotus hungy Azpelicueta, Almirón, Casciotta & Koerber, 2007
- Hisonotus iota T. P. Carvalho & R. E. dos Reis, 2009
- Hisonotus laevior Cope, 1894
- Hisonotus leucofrenatus (A. Miranda-Ribeiro, 1908)
- Hisonotus leucophrys T. P. Carvalho & R. E. dos Reis, 2009
- Hisonotus maculipinnis (Regan, 1912)
- Hisonotus megaloplax T. P. Carvalho & R. E. dos Reis, 2009
- Hisonotus montanus T. P. Carvalho & R. E. dos Reis, 2009
- Hisonotus nigricauda (Boulenger, 1891)
- Hisonotus notatus C. H. Eigenmann & R. S. Eigenmann, 1889
- Hisonotus notopagos T. P. Carvalho & R. E. dos Reis, 2011
- Hisonotus pachysarkos Zawadzki, Roxo & da Graça, 2016
- Hisonotus paulinus (Regan, 1908)
- Hisonotus prata T. P. Carvalho & R. E. dos Reis, 2011
- Hisonotus ringueleti Aquino, Schaefer & Miquelarena, 2001
- Hisonotus taimensis (Buckup, 1981)
- Hisonotus thayeri Martins & Langeani, 2016
- Hisonotus vespuccii Roxo, G. S. C. Silva & C. de Oliveira, 2015
- Hisonotus vireo T. P. Carvalho & R. E. dos Reis, 2011
- Hisonotus yasi (Almirón, Azpelicueta & Casciotta, 2004)
