= Hisonotus pachysarkos =

Conservation status
- Least Concern (IUCN 3.1)

Scientific classification
- Kingdom: Animalia
- Phylum: Chordata
- Class: Actinopterygii
- Order: Siluriformes
- Family: Loricariidae
- Genus: Hisonotus
- Species: H. pachysarkos

Binomial name
- Hisonotus pachysarkos Zawadzki, Roxo & da Graça, 2016

Species of catfish

Hisonotus pachysarkos is a species of freshwater ray-finned fish belonging to the family Loricariidae, the suckermouth armored catfishes, and the subfamily Hypoptopomatinae. the cascudinhos. This catfish is endemic to Brazil where occurs in the Ivaí River basin in the state of Paraná. This species reaches a standard length of 4.15 cm (1.63 in). H. pachysarkos was described in 2016 by Cláudio Henrique Zawadzki and Weferson Júnio da Graça of State University of Maringá and Fábio F. Roxo of São Paulo State University.
