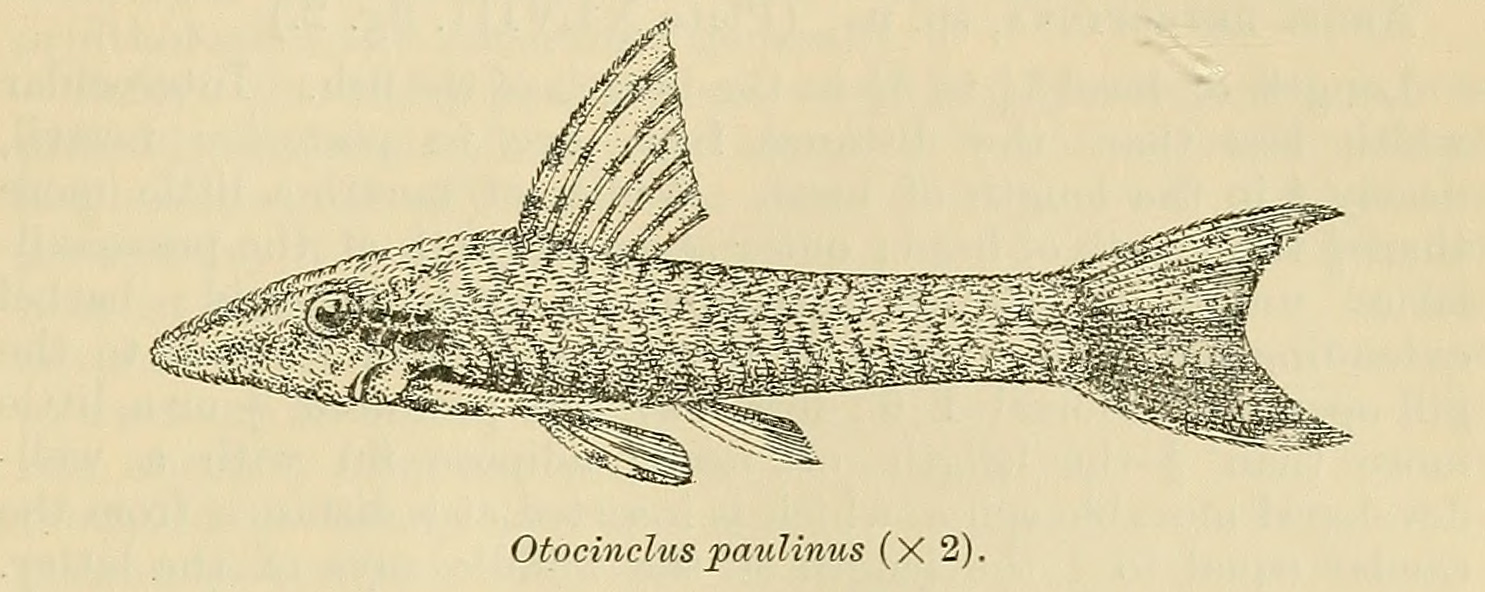

Conservation status
- Data Deficient (IUCN 3.1)

Scientific classification
- Kingdom: Animalia
- Phylum: Chordata
- Class: Actinopterygii
- Order: Siluriformes
- Family: Loricariidae
- Genus: Hisonotus
- Species: H. paulinus

Binomial name
- Hisonotus paulinus (Regan, 1908)

Synonyms
- Otocinclus paulinus Regan, 1908; Microlepidogaster paulinus (Regan, 1908); Microlepidogaster depressinotus A. Miranda-Ribeiro, 1918; Otocinclus depressinotus (A. Miranda Ribeiro, 1918); Hisonotus depressinotus (A. Miranda Ribeiro, 1918)

= Hisonotus paulinus =

Species of fish

Hisonotus paulinus is a species of freshwater ray-finned fish belonging to the family Loricariidae, the suckermouth armored catfishes, and the subfamily Hypoptopomatinae. the cascudinhos. This catfish is endemic to Brazil where it is found in the Tietê River basin in the state of São Paulo. This species reaches a standard length of 4 cm (1.6 in).
