= Hisonotus bocaiuva =

Conservation status
- Least Concern (IUCN 3.1)

Scientific classification
- Kingdom: Animalia
- Phylum: Chordata
- Class: Actinopterygii
- Order: Siluriformes
- Family: Loricariidae
- Genus: Hisonotus
- Species: H. bocaiuva

Binomial name
- Hisonotus bocaiuva Roxo, G. S. C. Silva, C. de Oliveira & Zawadzki, 2013

Species of catfish

Hisonotus bocaiuva is a species of freshwater ray-finned fish belonging to the family Loricariidae, the suckermouth armoured catfishes, and the subfamily Hypoptopomatinae, the cascudinhos. This catfish is known only from the drainages of the Cachoeira stream in the Jequitaí River drainage, a part of the São Francisco river basin, which is in the municipality of Bocaiúva, Minas Gerais. This species reaches a standard length of 2.4 cm (0.94 in).
