= Rio Grande, Rio Grande do Sul =

Municipality of Rio Grande do Sul, Brazil

Rio Grande
- Municipality
- Municipality of Rio Grande
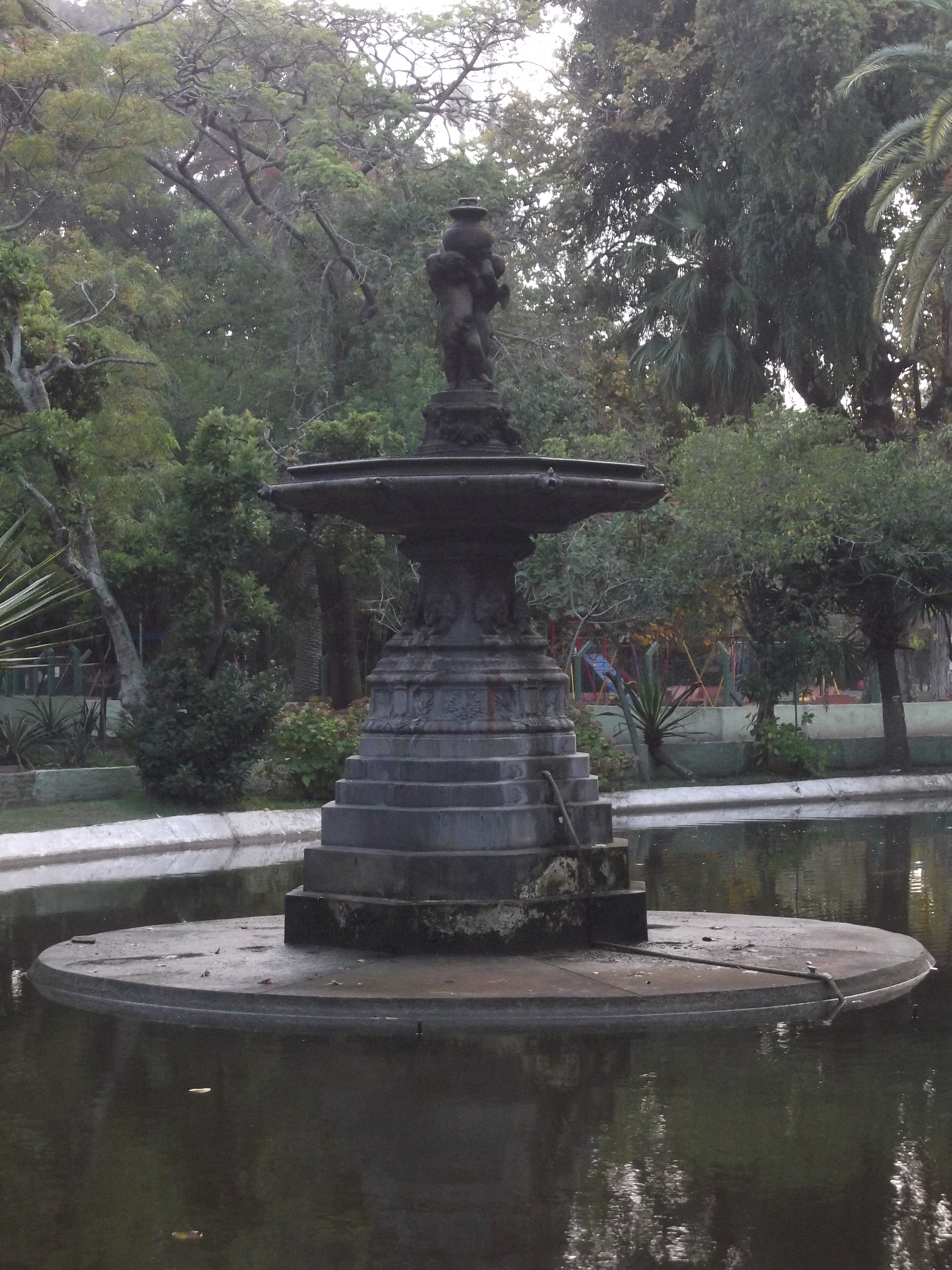
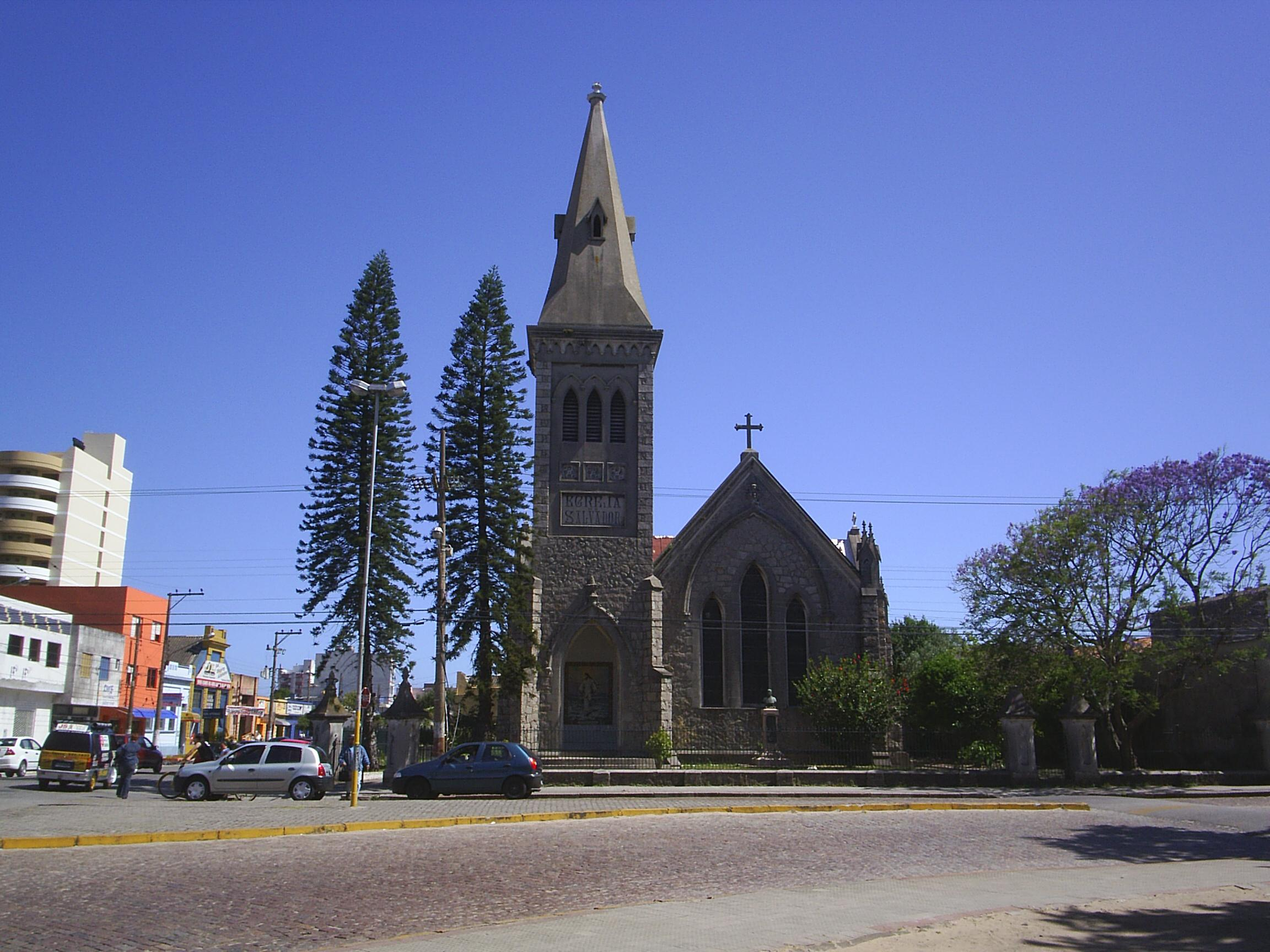
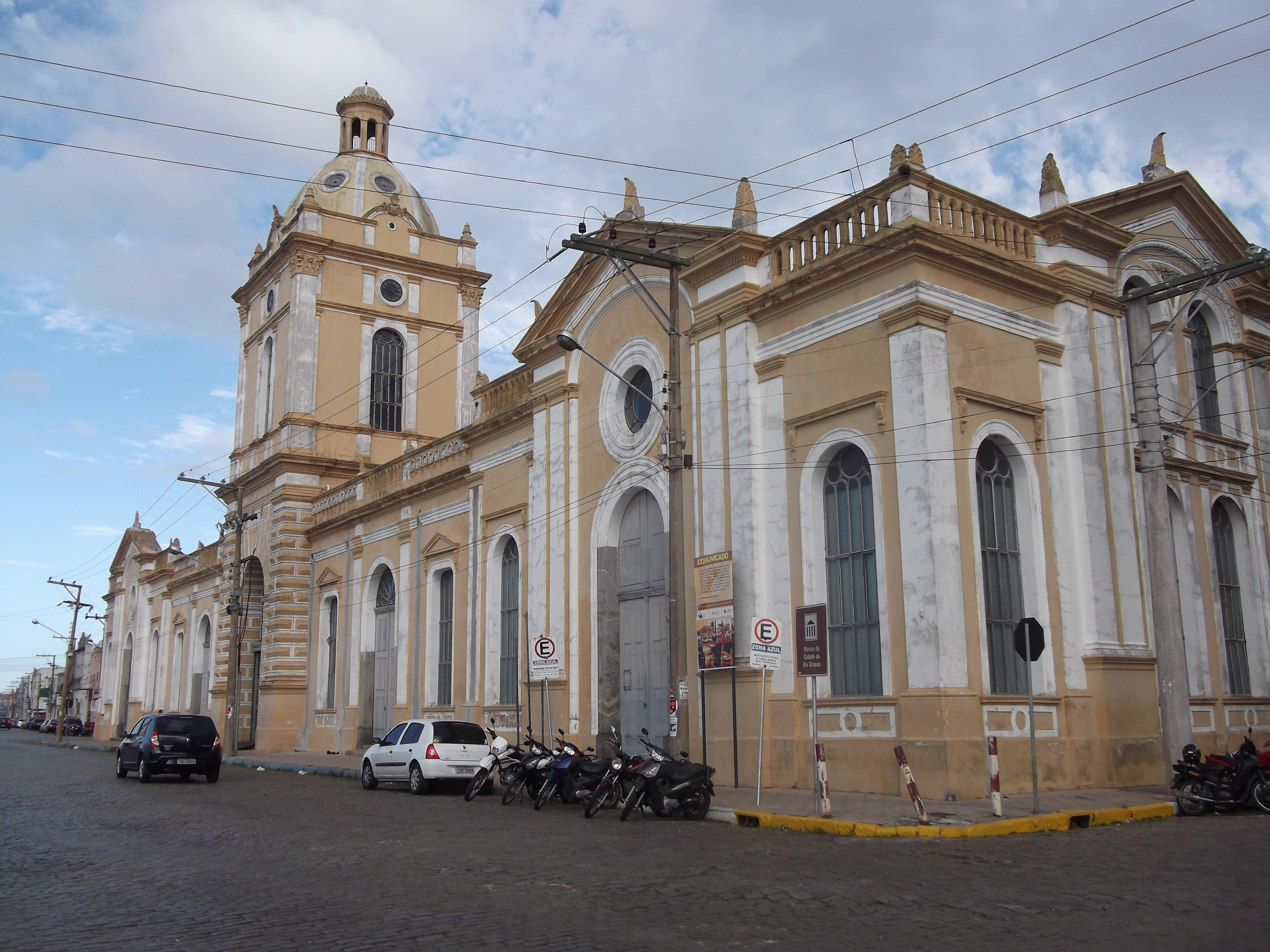
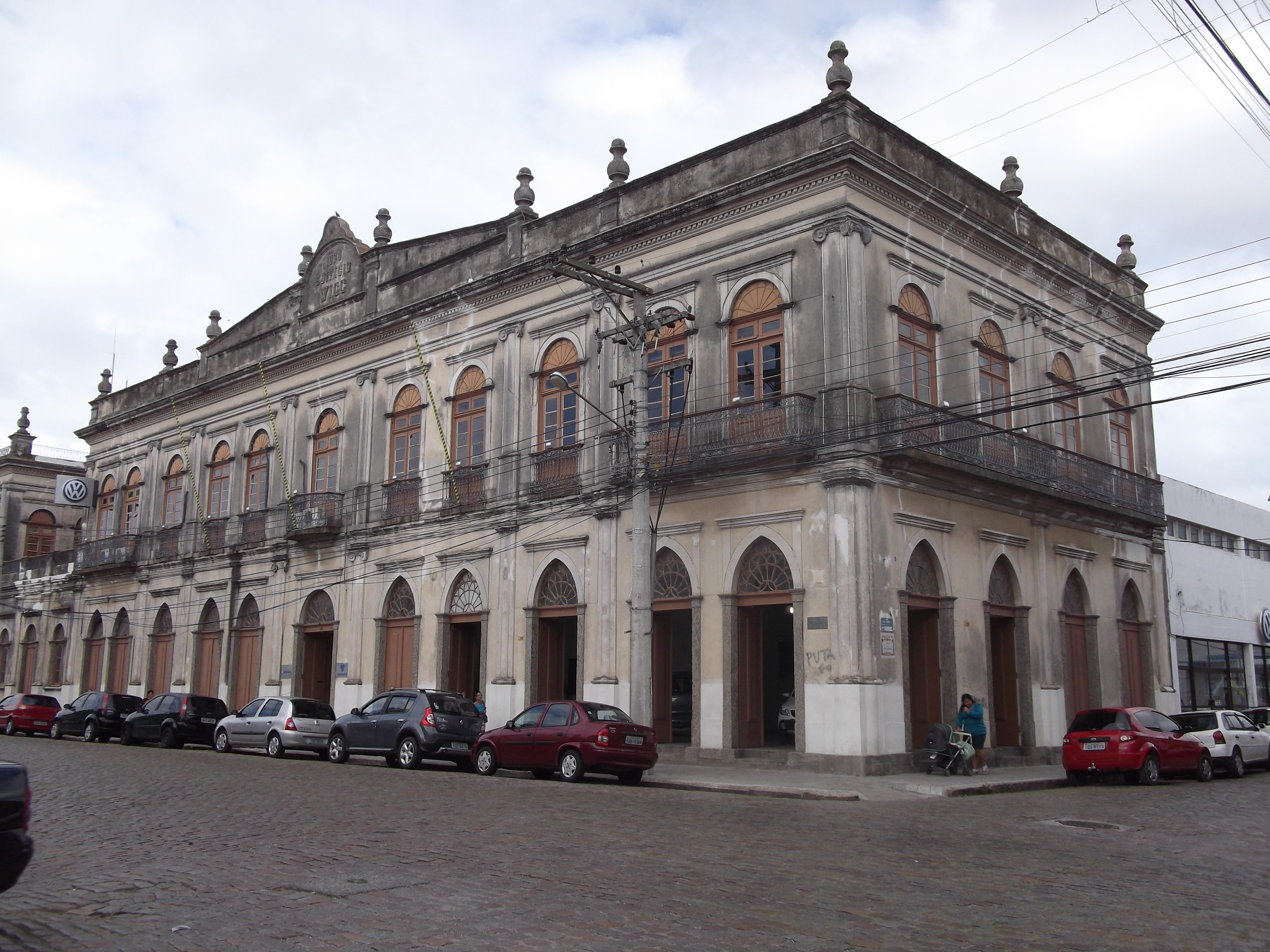
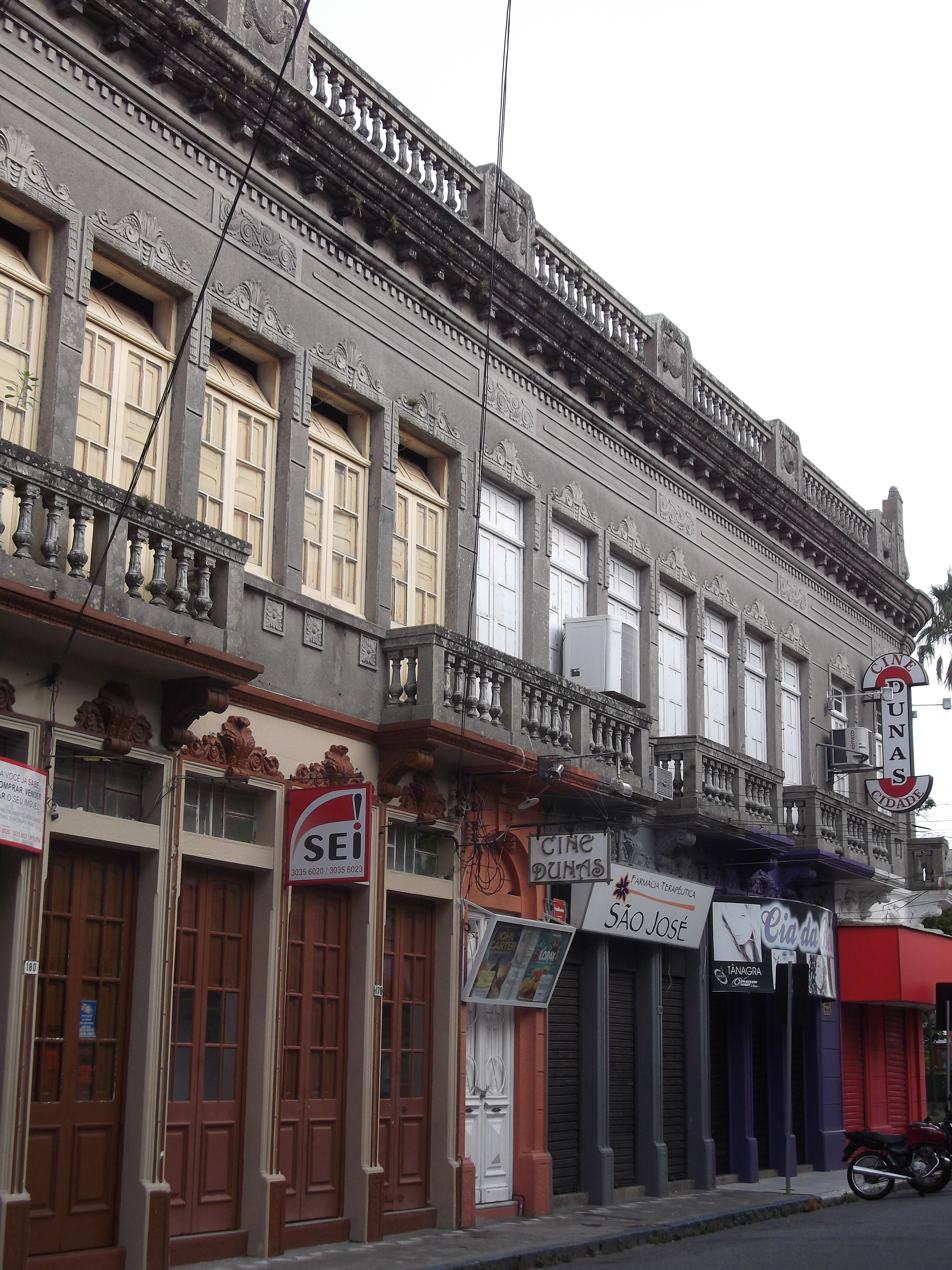
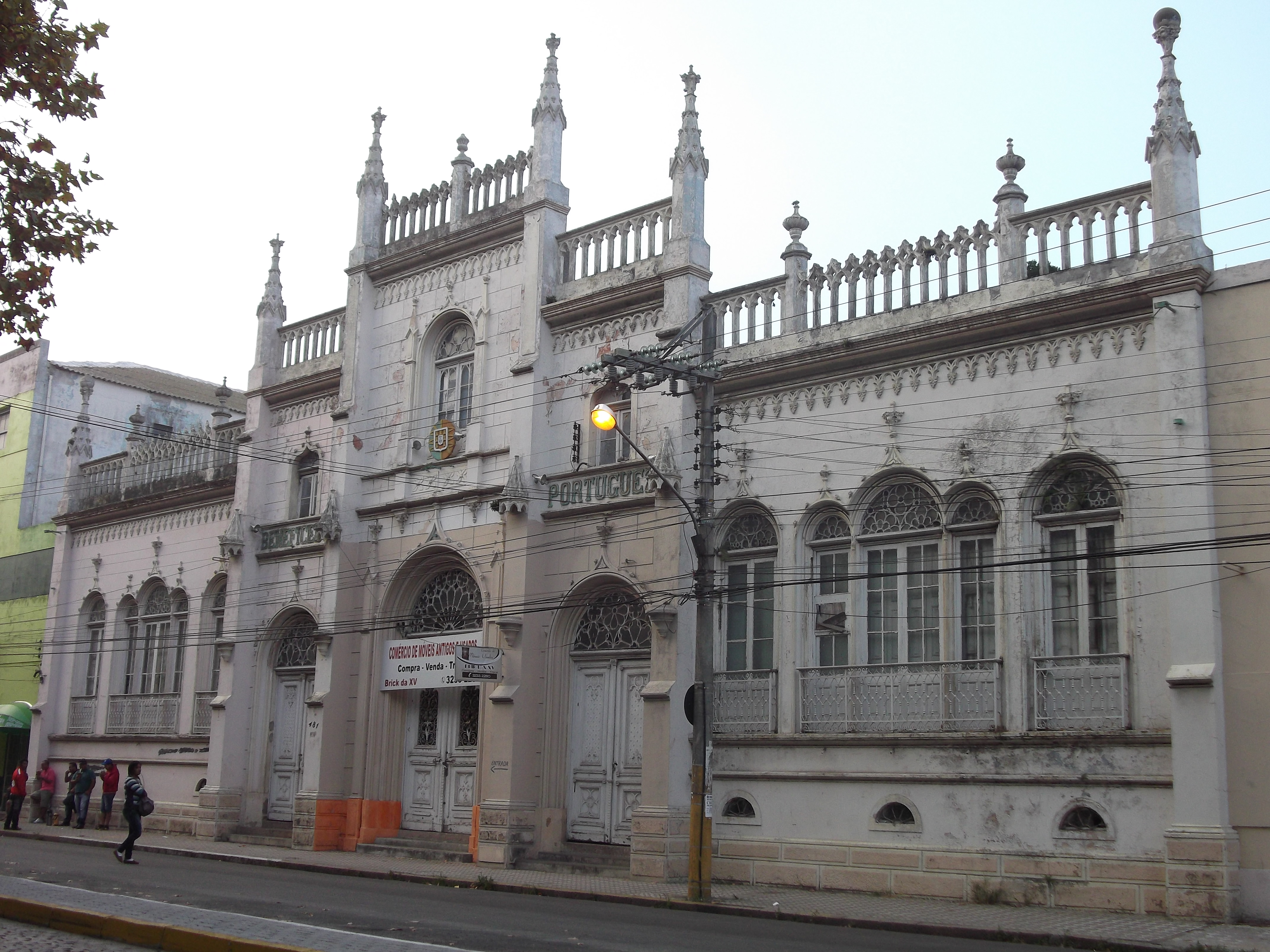
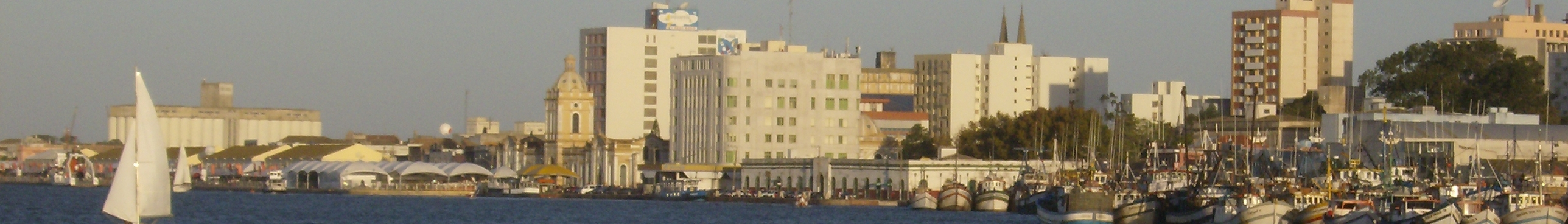

- Flag Coat of arms
- Nickname: Noiva do mar (Bride of the Sea)

- Location in Brazil
- Coordinates: 32°02′06″S 52°05′55″W
- Country: Brazil
- Region: South
- State: Rio Grande do Sul
- Founded: 1737
- Incorporated: 1835

Government
  - Mayor: Darlene Pereira (PT)

Area
  - Total: 2,709.53 km^{2} (1,046.16 sq mi)
- Elevation: 6 m (20 ft)

Population (2022 Brazilian Census)
  - Total: 191,900
  - Estimate (2025): 198,935
  - Density: 70.82/km^{2} (183.4/sq mi)
- Time zone: UTC−3 (BRT)
- Postal code: 96500
- Area code: (+55) 53
- HDI (2010): 0.744 – high
- Website: www.riogrande.rs.gov.br

Rio Grande (lit. 'Great River') is a municipality (município) and one of the oldest cities in the Brazilian state of Rio Grande do Sul. It was the state capital from 1835 to 1845. It is the most important port city in the state and has one of the most important maritime ports in Brazil.

The city is named after a nearby channel which indirectly connects the Lagoa dos Patos, to the northeast, and Lagoa Mirim, to the west, with the Atlantic Ocean. The municipality is bordered by Santa Vitória do Palmar on the south and Pelotas on the north, which lies across the São Gonçalo Channel.

The city built up its wealth over the course of its long history of strong industrial movements. Today it is still one of the richest cities in Rio Grande do Sul, mainly because of its port, the second busiest in Brazil, and its refinery, which processes Ipiranga petroleum.

The city is served by Rio Grande Airport.

== History ==
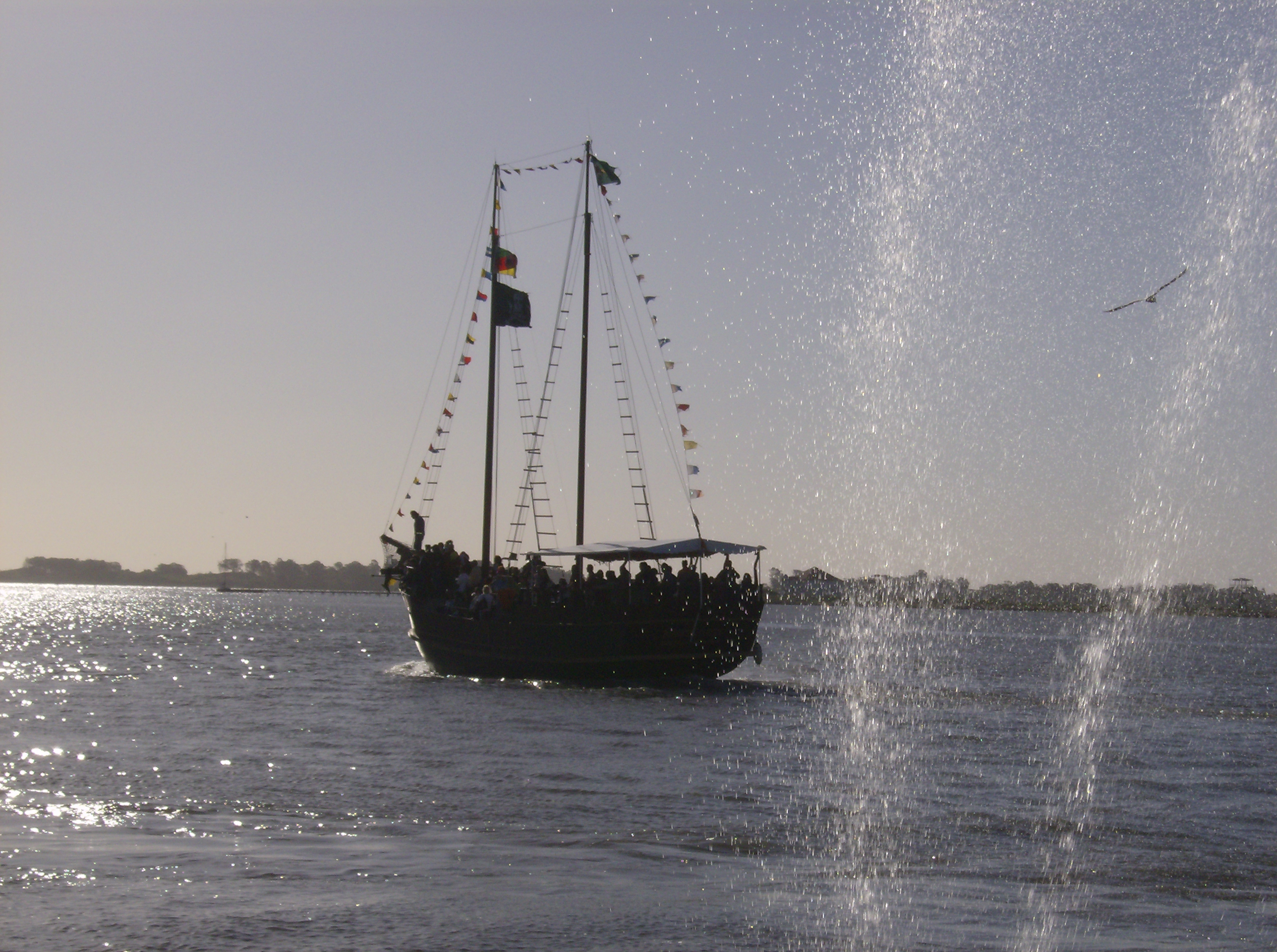
A schooner in Lagoa dos Patos, in a municipal fair named Festa do Mar.

The history of Rio Grande is as old as the history of the whole region. It was explored by Portuguese sailors led by Martim Afonso de Sousa who sought fortified places along the southern Brazilian coast for a defense against the French corsairs. He discovered the tributary which indirectly connects the Lagoa dos Patos and Lagoa Mirim to the Atlantic Ocean and called the place Rio Grande de São Pedro (lit. 'Large River of St. Peter').

In 1669, the Portuguese established a colony further down the South American coastline along the Río de la Plata, which they called Colônia do Sacramento. With the first permanent Portuguese settlement in the region, livestock was introduced and began to spread far and wide over the territory. With the new settlers, the Portuguese decided to make a church-sanctioned settlement and, in 1736, created the Freguesia de São Pedro which covered what is today all of Uruguay and Rio Grande do Sul.

The city of Rio Grande was founded in 1737 by Brigadier General José da Silva Pais and his men to defend Portugal's territory. The Jesus Maria e José Fort was constructed, which was built on the site of the future city. The fort was transformed into a town when colonists from the Azores and Madeira arrived in the 1750s. In 1751, the growing colony became the Village of Rio Grande de São Pedro. In 1760, Rio Grande de São Pedro, which was formerly governed from Santa Catarina became its own captaincy, a type of administrative division.

In 1763 the village was occupied by the Spanish. After constant disputes, Portugal reconquered the village in 1776, thanks to the actions of General Rafael Pinto Bandeira. However, when the fortress was taken by Spanish troops, many families fled to Viamão and established around its port the city of Porto Alegre.

During the Ragamuffin War, Rio Grande became a city and the province's capital all at once. In 1835, revolutionary General Bento Gonçalves da Silva forced Antônio Rodrigues Fernandes Braga, the provincial president, to flee from Porto Alegre to Rio Grande, a journey of about 200 km. The city remained the province's seat of government until the revolution's end in 1845.

== Geography ==
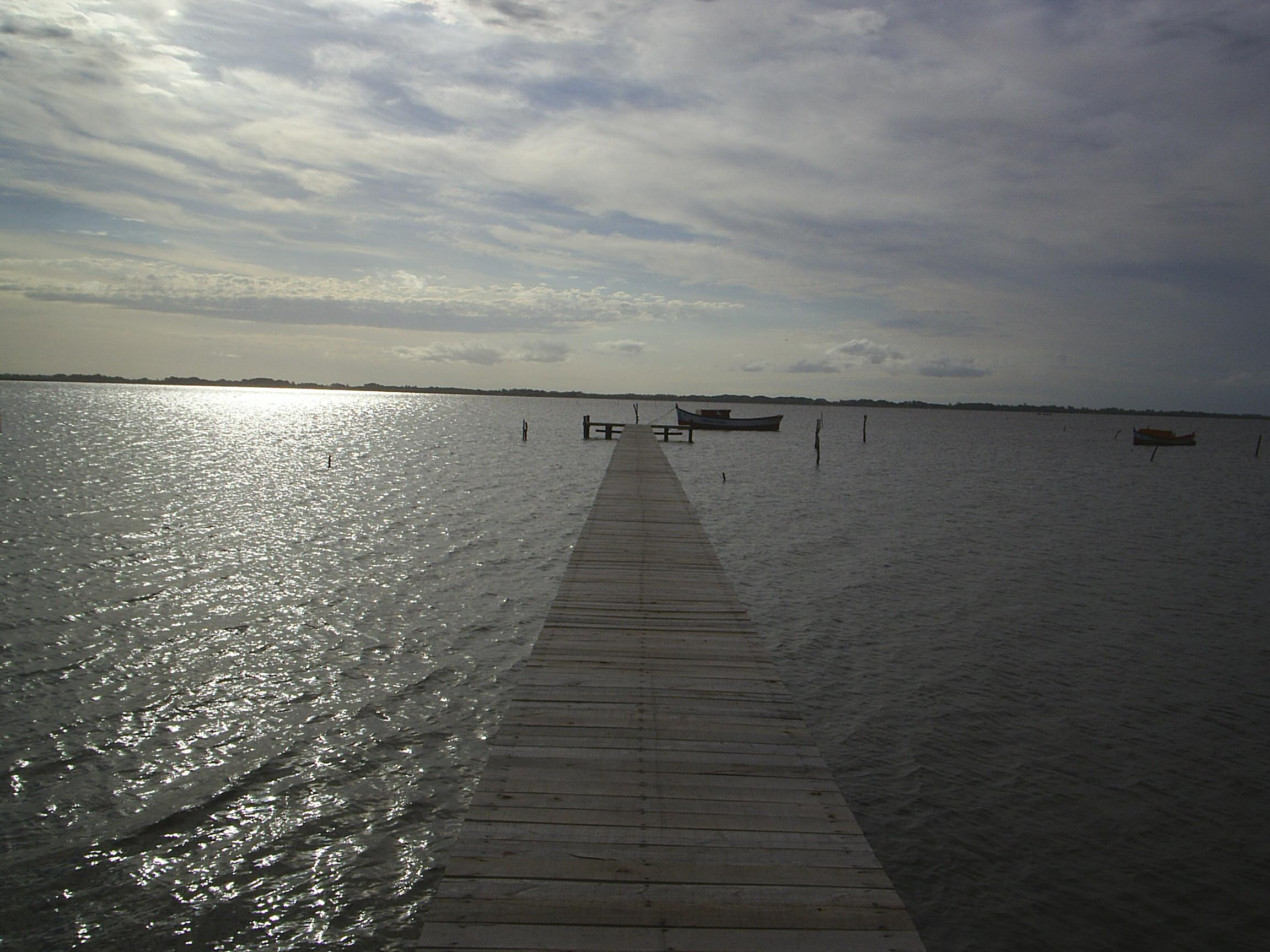
Pier stretching into the Lagoa dos Patos from the Ilha dos Marinheiros

Rio Grande, as the name suggests, is a littoral city, which boasts what many call the longest beach in the world — Praia do Cassino. This beach is approximately 250 km (160 mi) of uninterrupted Atlantic coastline. The entire municipality lies at a very low altitude — at its highest point only 10 meters (33 feet) above sea level. Additionally, the city, which is surrounded by water, sinks about one centimeter every year.

The city is named after its 24-mile long tidal channel which indirectly mingles the waters of the Lagoa dos Patos and Lagoa Mirim with the Atlantic Ocean. The largest and most populous island in the Lagoa dos Patos is the Ilha dos Marinheiros, which is part of the municipality.

For the most part, Rio Grande is made up of fields of low and herbaceous vegetation, characteristic of the Uruguayan savanna. There are also planted trees, mostly eucalyptus and pine. Sand dunes are found all up and down the coastline.

The municipality contains part of the Taim Ecological Station.

=== Climate ===
The climate of Rio Grande is humid subtropical and mild, with a strong oceanic influence and relatively cool winters, warm summers and regular precipitation all year. The average temperature in the city is 18.3 °C (64.9 °F) and the average annual precipitation is 1,207 mm (47.5 in). The hottest month is January, with an average temperature of 23.6 °C (74.5 °F). The coldest month is July, with an average temperature of 12.9 °C (55.2 °F), but due to intense winds in the city, the wind chill temperature frequently drops to 6 °C (43 °F).

Climate data for Rio Grande (1981–2010 normals, extremes 1931–present)
Month	Jan	Feb	Mar	Apr	May	Jun	Jul	Aug	Sep	Oct	Nov	Dec	Year
Record high °C (°F)	41.2 (106.2)	39.3 (102.7)	37.6 (99.7)	35.4 (95.7)	30.6 (87.1)	29.3 (84.7)	31.4 (88.5)	32.5 (90.5)	35.3 (95.5)	34.1 (93.4)	35.1 (95.2)	39.6 (103.3)	41.2 (106.2)
Mean daily maximum °C (°F)	27.8 (82.0)	27.5 (81.5)	26.7 (80.1)	24.0 (75.2)	20.5 (68.9)	17.7 (63.9)	16.8 (62.2)	18.3 (64.9)	19.2 (66.6)	21.8 (71.2)	24.2 (75.6)	26.6 (79.9)	22.6 (72.7)
Daily mean °C (°F)	23.4 (74.1)	23.2 (73.8)	22.5 (72.5)	19.3 (66.7)	15.8 (60.4)	13.1 (55.6)	12.5 (54.5)	13.7 (56.7)	15.0 (59.0)	17.7 (63.9)	19.8 (67.6)	21.1 (70.0)	18.2 (64.8)
Mean daily minimum °C (°F)	19.9 (67.8)	19.4 (66.9)	19.1 (66.4)	15.6 (60.1)	12.3 (54.1)	9.6 (49.3)	9.2 (48.6)	10.2 (50.4)	11.6 (52.9)	14.5 (58.1)	16.4 (61.5)	18.5 (65.3)	14.7 (58.5)
Record low °C (°F)	9.0 (48.2)	9.7 (49.5)	7.5 (45.5)	4.2 (39.6)	1.6 (34.9)	−0.5 (31.1)	−0.6 (30.9)	0.0 (32.0)	−0.1 (31.8)	5.1 (41.2)	5.7 (42.3)	8.0 (46.4)	−0.6 (30.9)
Average precipitation mm (inches)	98.9 (3.89)	128.6 (5.06)	90.9 (3.58)	118.4 (4.66)	114.6 (4.51)	114.0 (4.49)	125.7 (4.95)	122.1 (4.81)	113.6 (4.47)	98.1 (3.86)	95.5 (3.76)	86.2 (3.39)	1,306.6 (51.44)
Average precipitation days (≥ 1.0 mm)	8	8	8	8	8	8	8	8	9	8	7	7	95
Average relative humidity (%)	79.7	80.2	80.7	82.1	85.3	86.1	85.4	84.5	83.1	80.6	79.1	77.9	82.1
Mean monthly sunshine hours	243.7	205.6	212.1	175.2	161.5	132.9	141.8	154.0	162.7	189.4	222.6	251.7	2,253.2
Source: INMET

== Sport ==
The two local association football clubs SC Rio Grande, Brazil's oldest active football club, and SC São Paulo, a former Serie A team, compete the derby known as Rio-Rita. Both are previous one-time state champions, in 1936 and 1933 respectively.

São Paulo won 2 Campeonato Gaúcho Série A2 titles and promoted in 1967 and 1970. Rio Grande won 1 Campeonato Gaúcho Série A2 title in 1962 and 1 Campeonato Gaúcho Série B in 2014.

Rio-Grandense is another club in the city and are also a one-time Campeonato Gaúcho champion in 1939 and were runners-up to Grêmio Santanense in 1937, Guarany de Bagé in 1938 and Gremio in 1946.

== Sister city ==
- Águeda, Portugal

== See also ==
- List of municipalities in Rio Grande do Sul
