= Hisonotus vespuccii =

Conservation status
- Least Concern (IUCN 3.1)

Scientific classification
- Kingdom: Animalia
- Phylum: Chordata
- Class: Actinopterygii
- Order: Siluriformes
- Family: Loricariidae
- Genus: Hisonotus
- Species: H. vespuccii

Binomial name
- Hisonotus vespuccii Roxo, G. S. C. Silva & C. de Oliveira, 2015

Species of fish

Hisonotus vespuccii is a species of freshwater ray-finned fish belonging to the family Loricariidae, the suckermouth armored catfishes, and the subfamily Hypoptopomatinae. the cascudinhos. This catfish occurs in the São Francisco River and three of its tributaries: the Das Velhas River, the Paraopeba River, and the Formoso River in the Brazilian state of Minas Gerais. It is found in areas with marginal vegetation and reaches a standard length of 3.6 cm (1.4 in). The Specific name honors the first European to discover of the São Francisco river, the Italian explorer Amerigo Vespucci.
