= Hisonotus notatus =

Conservation status
- Least Concern (IUCN 3.1)

Scientific classification
- Kingdom: Animalia
- Phylum: Chordata
- Class: Actinopterygii
- Order: Siluriformes
- Family: Loricariidae
- Genus: Hisonotus
- Species: H. notatus

Binomial name
- Hisonotus notatus C. H. Eigenmann & R. S. Eigenmann, 1889

Synonyms
- Otocinclus notatus (C. H. Eigenmann & R. S. Eigenmann, 1889); Microlepidogaster notatus (C. H. Eigenmann & R. S. Eigenmann, 1889)

Species of catfish

Hisonotus notatus is a species of freshwater ray-finned fish belonging to the family Loricariidae, the suckermouth armored catfishes, and the subfamily Hypoptopomatinae. the cascudinhos. This catfish is endemic to Brazil where occurs in the São João River and other coastal drainages of the state of Rio de Janeiro draining into Guanabara Bay and Sepetiba Bay. This species reaches a standard length of 4.3 cm (1.7 in). H. notatus was described in 1889 by Carl H. Eigenmann and Rosa Smith Eigenmann with its type locality given as Rio de Janeiro State, Santa Cruz, rio Guandu, Santa Cruz farm - Emperor Pedro II's farm at 22°54'40"S, 43°41'7"W. When Eigenmann and Eigenmann described this species they proposed the new monospecific genus Hisonotus, designating H. notatus as its type species. H. notatus was formerly considered conspecific with H. thayeri, but a 2016 revision by Fernanda Martins and Francisco Langeani redescribed H. notatus and adopted the new name H. thayeri to some populations formerly classified as H. notatus.
