= Hisonotus alberti =

Conservation status
- Least Concern (IUCN 3.1)

Scientific classification
- Kingdom: Animalia
- Phylum: Chordata
- Class: Actinopterygii
- Order: Siluriformes
- Family: Loricariidae
- Genus: Hisonotus
- Species: H. alberti

Binomial name
- Hisonotus alberti Roxo, Silva, Waltz & J. E. G. Melo, 2016

Species of catfish

Hisonotus alberti is a species of freshwater ray-finned fish belonging to the family Loricariidae, the suckermouth armoured catfishes, and the subfamily Hypoptopomatinae, the cascudinhos. This catfish occurs in the upper basins of the Paraná and São Francisco Rivers in the states of Minas Gerais and Mato Grosso do Sul. This species reaches a standard length of 3.4 cm (1.3 in). H. alberti was first formally described in 2016 by Fábio Fernandes Roxo, Gabriel de Souza da Costa e Silva, Brandon T. Waltz & Jorge Enrique García-Melo with its type locality given as the municipality of São Roque de Minas, ribeirão das Posses, upper rio Paraná basin at 20°17'15"S, 46°34'53"W. Its specific name honours the American ichthyologist James S. Albert of the University of Louisiana at Lafayette in recognition of his work on Neotropical freshwater fishes.
