= Ilha dos Marinheiros =

Coordinates: 32°00′S 52°09′W

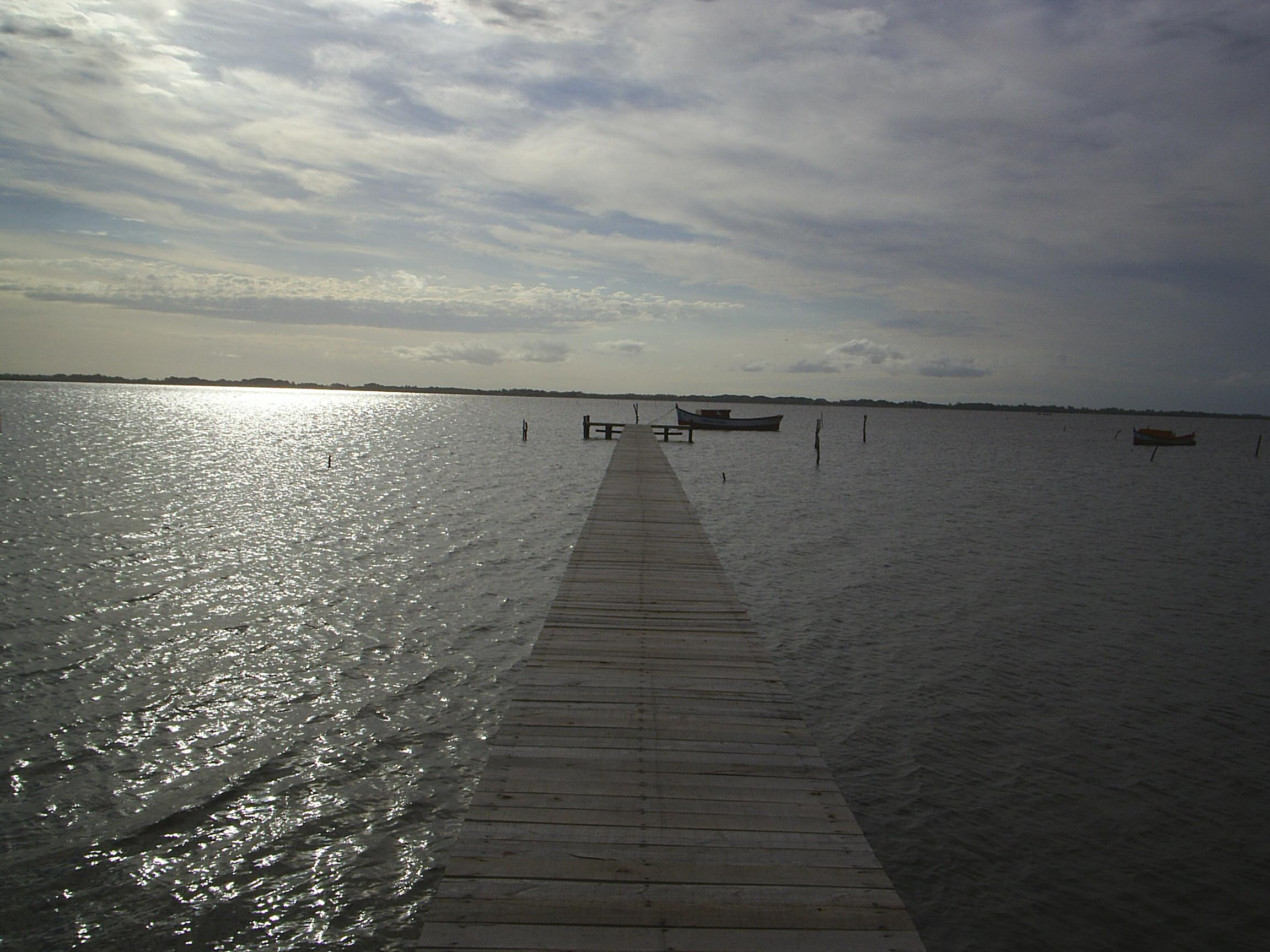
Pier stretching into the Lagoa dos Patos from the Ilha dos Marinheiros

Ilha dos Marinheiros (Portuguese pronunciation: [ˈiʎɐ duz maɾiˈɲejɾus] "Island of the Sailors") is an island located in the south part of a lagoon named Lagoa dos Patos, located in the municipality of Rio Grande, in the state of Rio Grande do Sul, Brazil. It is situated on the west bank of that lagoon. This island has an area 39.28 km^{2} (15.17 sq mi) and is situated 1.5 km (0.93 mi) off the continent at its nearest point.

It has 1,324 inhabitants (2000 Census), the majority of Portuguese descent.

== History ==
Ilha dos Marinheiros is considered part of the heritage of the city of Rio Grande due to the preservation of the culture of the Portuguese, who colonized it. Before the arrival of the first Portuguese settlers, the island was occupied by indigenous people. According to archaeological evidence discovered there, the groups were: Minuane, Charrua and Guaraní.

The importance of the island was tied to the Rio Grande, which supplied water, firewood, and wood for the fortifications as well as for the settlers of the Town of Rio Grande de São Pedro. In the past, the island supplied all of the trade in Rio Grande and nearby locations; it currently produces about 80% of the vegetables consumed in Rio Grande.

In 1845, the island was visited by Emperor Dom Pedro II of Brazil.

== Geography ==
The Ilha dos Marinheiros is the largest and most fertile island of the Lagoa dos Patos. Near the banks, the depth of the basin is less than 1 metre (3.28 feet). To the south, there is a thin chain of dunes covered by heterogeneous vegetation.

The island formed from the gradual accumulation of sediments of fluvio-lacustrine origin and its natural landscape consists of three different areas: the margins, the high dunes area and the interior (depression on dunes). From the limits of the chain of dunes to the interior of the island, there is a great scene of lagoons, dunes, a forest of pine and shrubs. The chain of dunes covers an extension from northeast to northwest. The high dunes are formed by quartz grains. Currently, the dunes have thicker vegetation because of reforestation programs carried out by private companies. There is a depression on the island, which creates many lakes in the winter, which almost completely dry in the summer.

It is considered the most fertile part of the municipality of Rio Grande and has been the most important agricultural centre for the production of vegetables, fruit and manufacture of wine, which supplied the town and exports on a large scale.

The climate of the island is subtropical or temperate (Cfa), with warm summers, cool winters and rainfall well distributed throughout the year. The summers’ average registers approximately 22 °C (71.6 °F), and the winters register average of 13 °C (55.4 °F). The average annual temperature is 17.6 °C (63.6 °F) and the average precipitation is 1,200 mm (47.24 in) annually.

== See also ==
- Lagoa dos Patos

== Sources ==
- (in Portuguese) Rio Grande Virtual
