= Hisonotus laevior =

Conservation status
- Least Concern (IUCN 3.1)

Scientific classification
- Kingdom: Animalia
- Phylum: Chordata
- Class: Actinopterygii
- Order: Siluriformes
- Family: Loricariidae
- Genus: Hisonotus
- Species: H. laevior

Binomial name
- Hisonotus laevior Cope, 1894

Synonyms
- Otocinclus laevior (Cope, 1894); Microlepidogaster laevior (Cope, 1894); Hisonotus leptochilus Cope, 1864; Otocinclus leptochilus (Cope, 1894); Microlepidogaster leptochilus (Cope, 1894)

Species of catfish

Hisonotus laevior is a species of freshwater ray-finned fish belonging to the family Loricariidae, the suckermouth armored catfishes, and the subfamily Hypoptopomatinae. the cascudinhos. It is endemic to Brazil, where it occurs in the Lagoa dos Patos system, ranging from Lagoon Mirim to the Jacuí River basin in the state of Rio Grande do Sul. It is found in slow to moderate-flowing waters with sandy substrate and submerged vegetation. This species reaches a total length of 7.5 cm (3.0 in).
