= Liolaemus arambarensis =

Conservation status
- Endangered (IUCN 3.1)

Scientific classification
- Kingdom: Animalia
- Phylum: Chordata
- Class: Reptilia
- Order: Squamata
- Suborder: Iguania
- Family: Liolaemidae
- Genus: Liolaemus
- Species: L. arambarensis

Binomial name
- Liolaemus arambarensis Verrastro, Veronese, Bujes, & Martins Fias Filho, 2003

Species of lizard

Liolaemus arambarensis is a species of lizard in the family Liolaemidae from Brazil. It is endemic to the state of Rio de Janeiro.
