= Hisonotus aky =

Conservation status
- Least Concern (IUCN 3.1)

Scientific classification
- Kingdom: Animalia
- Phylum: Chordata
- Class: Actinopterygii
- Order: Siluriformes
- Family: Loricariidae
- Genus: Hisonotus
- Species: H. aky

Binomial name
- Hisonotus aky (Azpelicueta, Casciotta, Almirón & Koerber, 2004)

Synonyms
- Epactionotus aky Azpelicueta, Casciotta, Almirón & Koerber, 2004

Species of fish

Hisonotus aky, sometimes known as the green hisonotus, is a species of freshwater ray-finned fish belonging to the family Loricariidae, the suckermouth armoured catfishes, and the subfamily Hypoptopomatinae, the cascudinhos. This catfish occurs in the Uruguay River basin in Misiones Province, Argentina, and the states of Santa Catarina and Rio Grande do Sul in Brazil. This species reaches a standard length of 4 cm (1.6 in). H.aky was first formally described as Epactionotus aky in 2004 by María de las Mercedes Azpelicueta, Jorge Rafael Casciotta, Adriana Edith Almirón and Stefan Koerber with its type locality given as the Arroyo Garibaldi at 26°38'46.1"S, 53°59'55"W in the Uruguay River basin in Misiones, Argentina. In 2009 the species was reclassified in the genus Hisonotus.
