= Ipiranga do Sul =

Municipality in Rio Grande do Sul, Brazil

Coordinates: 27°56′13″S 52°25′33″W

- Municipality
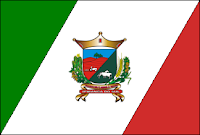
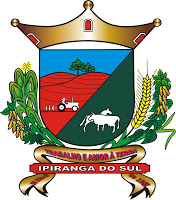
- Flag Coat of arms
- Interactive map of Ipiranga do Sul
- Country: Brazil
- Time zone: UTC−3 (BRT)

Ipiranga do Sul is a municipality in the state of Rio Grande do Sul, Brazil. As of 2020, the estimated population was 1,880.

== See also ==
- List of municipalities in Rio Grande do Sul
