= Akie Suzuki =

- 鈴木 あきえ
- Born: 12 March 1987 (age 39); Tokyo, Japan
- Other name: Akkī (アッキー)
- Occupations: Gravure idol; tarento; actress; reporter; presenter-MC; radio personality
- Years active: 2004–present
- Spouse: Undisclosed (m. 2017)
- Children: 2
- Modeling information
- Height: 154 cm (5 ft 1 in)

Akie Suzuki (鈴木 あきえ, 鈴木 明恵, Suzuki Akie; born 12 March 1987, in Tokyo) is a Japanese tarento, actress, reporter, presenter-MC, radio personality, and former gravure idol. She graduated from Yukitani High School. She is represented by Production No Title.

== Personal life ==
She dated an undisclosed TV director for two years, announced their engagement on March 11, 2017, and submitted their marriage registration on June 24 of the same year.

The couple have two children, a boy and a girl.

== Filmography ==
=== Television ===
Dates	Title	Network	Notes
Oct 2004 – Sep 2005	Tokyo Kinba	BS Fuji	
Apr 2005 – Mar 2006	Buranuki	TV Tokyo	
Apr–Sep 2005	Tensai no Pachinko	Fuji TV 721	
Jun 2005 – Mar 2006	Putchinuki	TX	
Oct 2005 –	Love Love Daisuki'!	Enta! 371	
Nov 2006 – Mar 2007	Kuchikomi 2.0 by kakaku.com	Tokyo MX	Presenter
Feb 2007 –	King's Brunch	TBS	
Apr–Sep 2007	Webtama ww	TX	
Apr 2008 – Feb 2013	NHK Kōkōkoza Kagaku	NHK E	Presenter
Oct 2009 –	Fukuro toji	NBN	MC
Apr 2010 –	Guitarist Retsuden	CS Music Air	MC assistant
Jun 2010 –	One Seg Lunch Box	NHK One Seg 2	Reporter
Oct 2010 – Mar 2011	Chikyū no Shaberi-kata	TBS	Assistant
11 Apr 2011 – 27 Mar 2014	Dai! Tensai TV-kun	NHK E	Presenter
	Drive A Go! Go!	TX	Quasi-regular
	Doyō Special	TX	Quasi-regular
28 Nov 2012 – 19 Dec 2012	Minna de Tezukuri Christmas: Dekiru made ga o Tanoshimi	TBS	
Apr 2013 –	Kai Dane!	TBS	
Jul 2013 –	Comuni TV	BS SukaPā	Presenter
Aug 2014 –	Hiru Bura	NHK	Quasi-regular, presenter
10 Apr 2016 –	Dōmo, NHK	NHK	Weekly MC

=== TV dramas ===
Date	Title	Role	Network	Notes
Jun 2006	Hanayome wa Yakudoshi'!	Guide	TBS	Episode 11
Dec 2006	Otona no Megane	Sawa Maki	Chiba TV	Lead role
2009	Boku no Imōto	Miss Caba	TBS	
2010	Clone Baby		TBS	Episodes 1 and 4
1 Nov 2010	Zeimu Chōsakan Tarō Madogiwa no Jiken-bo 21	Mari Ishizuka	TBS	
31 Oct 2011	Keishichō Kidō Sōsa-tai 216 II	Tomoyo Tabata	TBS	
26 Jul 2015	Napoleon no Mura	Reporter	TBS	

=== Films ===
Date	Title	Role
5 Oct 2005	Your and My Secret	Makoto Shiina
3 Apr 2010	Aeteyokatta.	Yuki Kojima
14 May 2016	Hentai Kamen: Abnormal Crisis	

=== Anime films ===
Date	Title	Role
13 Sep 2013	Eagle Talon: Utsukushiki Eriēru Shōshū Plus	
4 Oct 2014	Sammy to Shelly: Nanatsunoumi no Dai Bōken	Shelly
23 May 2015	Tensai Bakavon: Yomigaeru Flanders no Inu	Akiko Suzuki

=== Radio ===
Dates	Title	Network	Notes	Ref.
Oct 2005 – Apr 2007	Akie Suzuki to Watanabe Ani no Pin boke Paradise!	Internet Radio klap		
Oct 2008 – Mar 2009	Magical Snowland	FM Nack5		
Apr 2009 – Mar 2010	Chime!	FM Nack5	Responsible for Thursdays (Friday mornings)	
Oct 2010 – Mar 2011	Masato Ugajin 2030	FM Nack5		
Aug 2012 – Oct 2016	Taka no Tsumedan no Sekai Seifuku Radio	FM Tokyo		
Oct 2012 –	954 Special	TBS Radio		
26 Nov 2013	Tadashi Kakihana no anata to Happy!	NBS	Announcer Eriko Nasu's assistant on behalf of her absence	
13 Apr 2017 –	The Bay Line	Bay FM	Thursday personality	

=== Stage ===
Dates	Title	Production, Location
2–5 Nov 2006	Jinsei Dai Bakusō	MK-Box, Art Box Hall
15–18 Mar 2007	Chizu –Asayake ni Kimi o tsurete–	Theatre Workshop Take 1, Kyrian Small Hall
24–29 Jul 2007	Hyoi, Don!	Office Blue, Small Theatre "Paradise"
29–23 Dec 2007	Hiyoku no Tori/Finding Satoko	Office Blue, Eyepitte Mejiro
2–7 Mar 2010	Shōnen X: Jinbōchōkagetsu Tokubetsu Kōen	Yoshimoto Kogyo, Jimbocho Mohsuki
10, 11 Oct 2010	Shōnen X: Nagoya Kōen	Telepia Hall
6, 7 Nov 2011	Shōnen X: Osaka Kōen	Kyobashi Kagetsu
9 Jan 2012	Dai! Tensai TV-kun Special: Meisō Gekijō Urashima	Kanagawa Prefectural Civic Hall
4 Aug 2012	Dai! Tensai TV-kun Special: Manatsu no Yoru no Mushi	NHK Hall
11 Jan 2014	Dai! Tensai TV-kun Special: Puzzle no Meikyū to Zero no Hihō	Parthenon Tama

=== Advertisements ===
Dates	Product	Notes	Ref.
2006	Saitama Railway Corporation		
Jul–Dec 2006	Ace Contact		
Nov 2006 –	Nexus		
	Lotte ice cream	Infomercial	
Sep–Dec 2010	Taisho Pharmaceutical Co. Vicks Manin Densha		
Oct 2010	Kirin Beverage Gogo no Kōcha	King's Brunch collaboration advert	
Dec 2010	Plenus Hotto Motto		
11–14 Feb 2011	Meiji Seika "Meiji Tezukuri Joshi Gakuen"	Internet advert	
Jul 2012 –	SMBC Consumer Finance Motto! Service Kōjō Iinkai		
Sep 2012 –	Circle K Sunkus Fast Relax Cafe		
Oct 2013 –	Broadleaf "Kāunserā"		

== Works ==
=== Photo albums ===
Date	Title	Publisher	Photographer	ISBN
Jan 2005	Cheers–Akie Suzuki 1st. Shashin-shū	Ayanbokan Publishing	Isamu Ueno	ISBN 978-4775600634

=== DVD ===
Date	Title	Publisher
Dec 2004	Akkī Tōjō! –Minami no Shima no first line–	E-Net Frontier
Apr 2005	Doppelganger	GM Museum Soft
Nov 2005	Me ga aujikan	Forside.com
Apr 2006	Angel kiss –Smile Colosseum–	Tricolol
Aug 2006	19 no Love letter	Liverpool
Nov 2006	Makes You Happy	Liverpool

== Bibliography ==
=== Serialisations ===
Magazine	Title	Publisher	Notes
Break Max	"Idol Idobata Column Yamanotesen Future"	Core Magazine	Every month, she gets off at each station of the Yamanote line and introduces everything from the history around the station to the state of the city two-year planning corner

=== Books ===
Date	Title	Publisher	ISBN
8 Mar 2017	Dare to demo 3-bu de uchitokeru: Hon no Sukoshi no Kotsu	Kanki Publishing	ISBN 978-4-7612-7238-8
