= Tapes, Rio Grande do Sul =

Municipality of Rio Grande do Sul, Brazil

Tapes
- Municipality
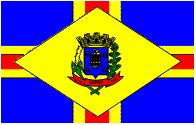
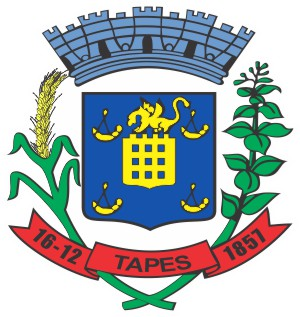
- Flag Coat of arms

- Location within Rio Grande do Sul

- Location in Brazil
- Coordinates: 30°40′22″S 51°23′45″W
- Country: Brazil
- State: Rio Grande do Sul

Population (2020)
  - Total: 17,332
- Time zone: UTC−3 (BRT)

Tapes is a municipality in Rio Grande do Sul state, Brazil, near to Porto Alegre.

== See also ==
- List of municipalities in Rio Grande do Sul
