= Hisonotus montanus =

Conservation status
- Data Deficient (IUCN 3.1)

Scientific classification
- Kingdom: Animalia
- Phylum: Chordata
- Class: Actinopterygii
- Division: Teleostei
- Order: Siluriformes
- Family: Loricariidae
- Genus: Hisonotus
- Species: H. montanus

Binomial name
- Hisonotus montanus Carvalho & Reis, 2009

Species of catfish

Hisonotus montanus is a species of freshwater ray-finned fish belonging to the family Loricariidae, the suckermouth armored catfishes, and the subfamily Hypoptopomatinae. the cascudinhos. This catfish is endemic to Brazil where it is known only from the Canoas River drainage.This species reaches a standard length of 4.5 cm (1.8 in). The specific name of this fish, montanus, derives from its tendency to be found at altitudes of roughly 850 m (2,790 ft) above sea level, marking it as the species of Hisonotus that occurs at the highest elevation of those native to the Uruguay River basin.
