= Hisonotus carreiro =

Conservation status
- Least Concern (IUCN 3.1)

Scientific classification
- Kingdom: Animalia
- Phylum: Chordata
- Class: Actinopterygii
- Order: Siluriformes
- Family: Loricariidae
- Genus: Hisonotus
- Species: H. carreiro

Binomial name
- Hisonotus carreiro Carvalho & Reis, 2011

Species of catfish

Hisonotus carreiro is a species of freshwater ray-finned fish belonging to the family Loricariidae, the suckermouth armored catfishes, and the subfamily Hypoptopomatinae. the cascudinhos. This catfish is endemic to Brazil where it occurs in the Carreiro River in the Taquari River drainage basin, part of the Lagoa dos Patos system in Rio Grande do Sul. This species reaches a standard length of 3.6 cm (1.4 in).
