= Pontifical Catholic University of Rio Grande do Sul =

Private non-profit Catholic university in Rio Grande do Sul, Brazil

- Pontifícia Universidade Católica do Rio Grande do Sul
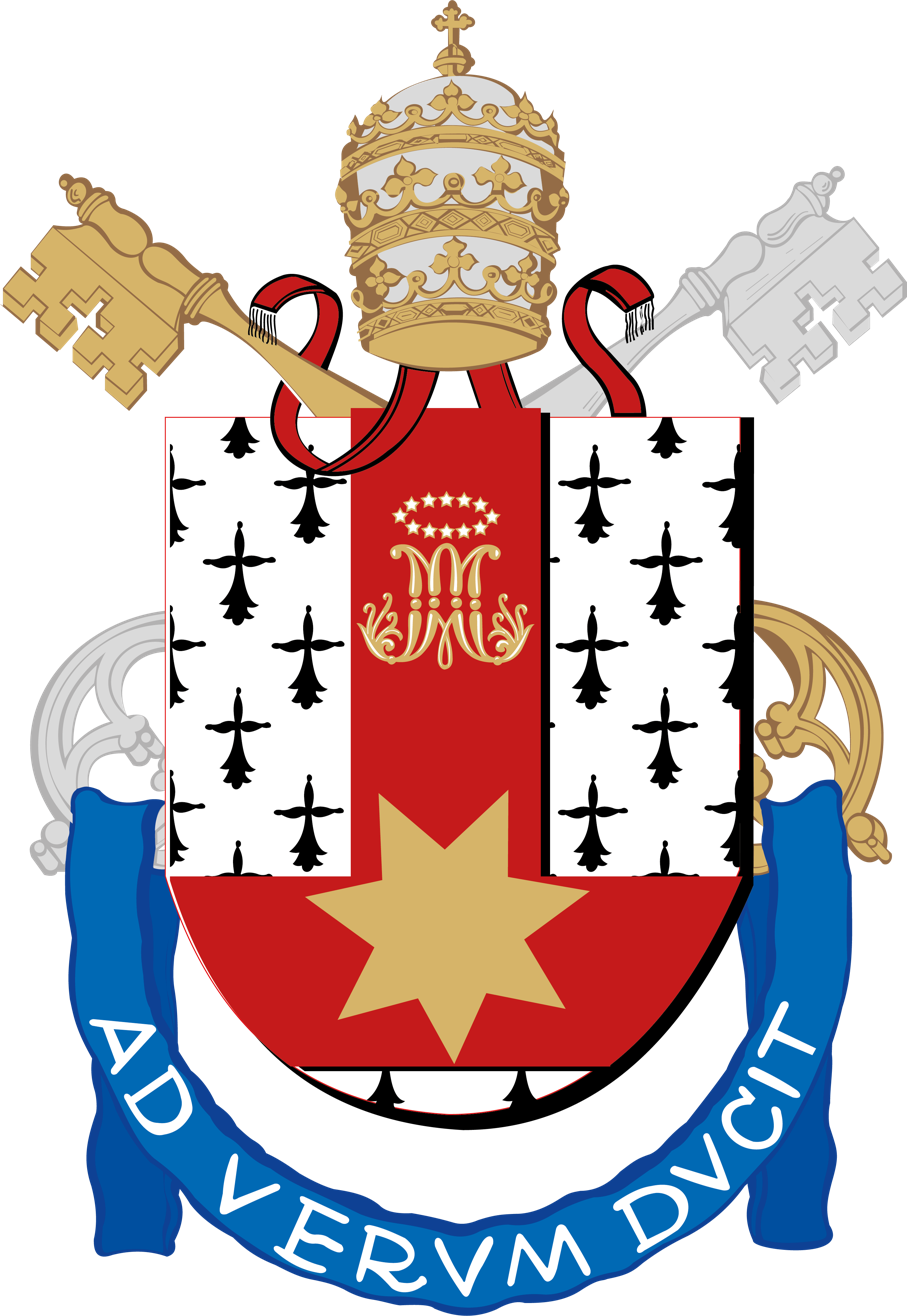
- Coat of arms of the University
- Other names: PUCRS, PUC-RS
- Motto: Ad verum ducit (Latin)
- Motto in English: Leading to the truth
- Type: Private
- Established: November 9, 1948
- Affiliations: Roman Catholic Church, Marist Brothers
- Chancellor: Dom Jaime Spengler
- Rector: Evilázio Teixeira
- Vice rector: Manuir José Mentges
- Faculty: 6,197
- Students: 30,567
- Undergraduates: 25,516
- Postgraduates: 5,051
- Location: Porto Alegre (headquarters), Viamão, Rio Grande do Sul, Brazil; 30°03′28.00″S 51°10′28.00″W
- Campus: Urban 565,93 km² (351,65 sq mi)
- Colors: Yellow and White
- Website: www.pucrs.br

The Pontifical Catholic University of Rio Grande do Sul (Portuguese: Pontifícia Universidade Católica do Rio Grande do Sul, PUCRS) is a private non-profit Catholic university. With campuses in the Brazilian cities of Porto Alegre and Viamão, it is the largest private university of the state of Rio Grande do Sul and the first university founded by the Catholic religious institute of the Marist Brothers. PUCRS is considered the best private university of Brazil's Southern Region by the Ministry of Education (MEC), and one of the best private universities in the country, with FGV, PUC-Rio and the PUC-SP.

== Facilities ==
The university has 22 faculties. The educational system is organized in courses and programs, which are responsible for undergraduate and graduate studies, continuing education, outreach activities and research.

As of 2011 the university had 25,000 undergraduate students, 1,800 postgraduate students, 6,300 master's students, and 1,400 PhD students. 130,000 students have graduated over the years. PUCRS offers 55 courses of graduation, 23 of master's degree, 19 of doctorate level, and more than 70 specialty training courses. University facilities include over 200 laboratories for teaching and research, as well as university hospital, science and technology park, museum of sciences and technology, sports park, theater and convention center.

== Academics ==
As of 2009 the university had 10 courses with 5 stars (Administration, Computer science, Biological sciences, Computer engineering, History, Dentistry, Education, Psychology, Advertising and Information systems) and 21 with 4 (Urban Architecture, Aeronautical sciences, Accounting, Social sciences, Law, Physical Education, Civil engineering, Control and Automation, Electrical engineering, Production engineering, Pharmacy, Philosophy, Physics, Physiotherapy, Journalism, Medicine, Chemistry, Public relations, Social services and Tourism). And champion in two more categories of private institutions in the Guia do Estudante: Computing and Mathematical sciences and Engineering and Production.

The university has won the National Award for Innovative Entrepreneurship, "The Best Technological Park of the Year:" TECNOPUC (conducted by the National Association of Entities Promoting Innovative Enterprises - Anprotec, Sebrae, Ministry of Science and Technology, Financing of Studies and Projects - FINEP and the National Confederation of Industry - CNI). The Museum of Science and Technology of PUCRS: The only five star attraction in Porto Alegre, according to the 2010 Guia Quatro Rodas 2010, by Editora Abril.

== History ==
PUCRS campus of Porto Alegre.

The origins of the Pontifícia Universidade Católica do Rio Grande do Sul date to the arrival in Brazil of the Marist Brothers, the religious congregation founded by Saint Marcellin Champagnat. In 1900 the first Marists arrived at the town of Bom Princípio (RS), following the request of Dom Cláudio José Gonçalves Ponce de Leão, bishop of Rio Grande do Sul. A number of Marists began to come from Europe and started founding schools throughout the region, culminating with the founding of the Nossa Senhora do Rosário School in Porto Alegre. That school eventually hosted college-level courses of accounting, from which the School of Political and Economic Sciences (Portuguese Faculdade de Ciências Políticas e Econômicas), which started in March 1931 with nine students, under the guidance of Brother Afonso, and expanded.

In 1940 the School of Philosophy, Sciences and Literature opened, followed by the School of Social Services in 1945, and by the School of Law in 1947. With these four schools, the Southern Brazil Union of Education and Teaching (Portuguese União Sul Brasileira de Educação e Ensino, USBEE), the civil entity of the Marist Brothers, requested recognition as a university by the Ministry of Education. On November 9, 1948, these schools became the Catholic University of Rio Grande do Sul (Universidade Católica do Rio Grande do Sul). On December 8, 1948, the Archbishop of Porto Alegre and University Chancellor, Dom Vicente Scherer, inaugurated the first administration of the university with Armando Pereira de Câmara as rector and Brother José Otão as vice-rector. The rectors that followed are Canon Alberto Etges (1951 to 1953), Brother José Otão (José Stefani) (1954 to 1978), Brother Liberato (Wilhelm Hunke), who completed Brother Otão's term from 5 February 1978, Brother Norberto Francisco Rauch (1979 to 2004), and Brother Joaquim Clotet from December 2004.

On November 1, 1950, Pope Pius XII, by request of the Marist Brothers and Archbishop Dom Vicente Scherer, granted the title of Pontifical to the university, signaling the Brothers' submission to the Holy See.

== See also ==
- Museum of Science and Technology (PUCRS)
- Brazil University Rankings
- Universities and Higher Education in Brazil
