= Lagoa dos Patos =

Lagoon in Rio Grande do Sul, Brazil

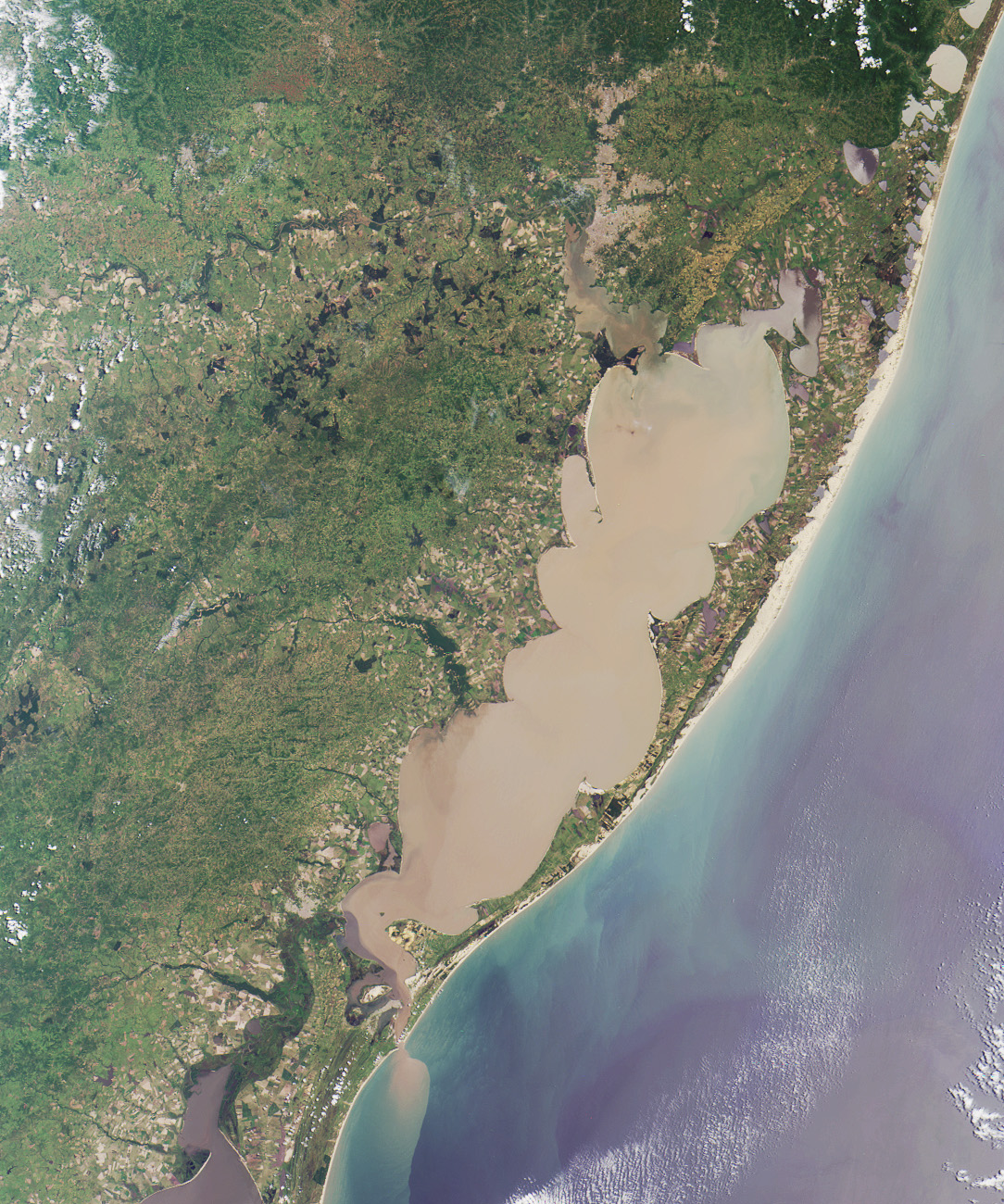
- Lagoa dos Patos from the Terra MISR satellite sensor

- Location within Brazil
- Location: Brazil
- Coordinates: 31°06′S 51°15′W
- Type: lagoon
- Primary inflows: Jacuí-Guaíba and Camaquã River
- Primary outflows: São Gonçalo Channel
- Catchment area: 201,626 km^{2} (77,848 mi^{2})
- Max. length: 290 kilometres (180 mi)
- Max. width: 71 kilometres (44 mi)
- Surface area: 10,100 km^{2} (3,900 mi^{2}) to 10,360 km^{2} (4,000 mi^{2})
- Average depth: 6 m (20 ft)

Lagoa dos Patos (Portuguese pronunciation: [laˈɡoɐ dus ˈpatus]; English: Ducks' Lagoon) is a coastal lagoon located in the state of Rio Grande do Sul, southern Brazil. It covers an area of 10,100 km^{2} (3,900 mi^{2}), is 290 kilometres (180 mi) long and has a maximum width of 71 kilometres (44 mi). It is the largest choked coastal lagoon in the world, the largest coastal lagoon in South America, and the largest lagoon in Brazil.

Lagoa dos Patos is separated from the Atlantic Ocean by a sandbar about 8.0 kilometres (5 mi) wide. The Jacuí-Guaíba and Camaquã Rivers empty into it, while the navigable São Gonçalo Channel, which enters Lagoa dos Patos near the town of Pelotas, connects Lagoa dos Patos to Lagoa Mirim to the south. The Rio Grande, at the south end of Lagoa dos Patos, forms the outlet to the Atlantic.

This lagoon is evidently the remains of an ancient depression in the coastline shut in by sand bars built up by the combined action of wind and current. The shallow lagoon is located at sea level and its waters are affected by the tides, normally they are brackish only a short distance above the Rio Grande outlet, but this can vary a lot. In droughts and favorable winds, sea water can be carried up to almost the entire lagoon.

The lagoon's largest and most fertile island is the Ilha dos Marinheiros, which is located near the eastern shore. The island is geopolitically part of the municipality of Rio Grande.

The lagoon hosts a rich biodiversity, including fresh- and brackish water fish, and water birds such as black-necked swan, coscoroba swan and Chilean flamingo. Top predators from ocean ecosystem, notably common bottlenose dolphins, can sometimes be seen at Lagoa dos Patos and exceptionally southern right whales are found at the Rio Grande outlet.

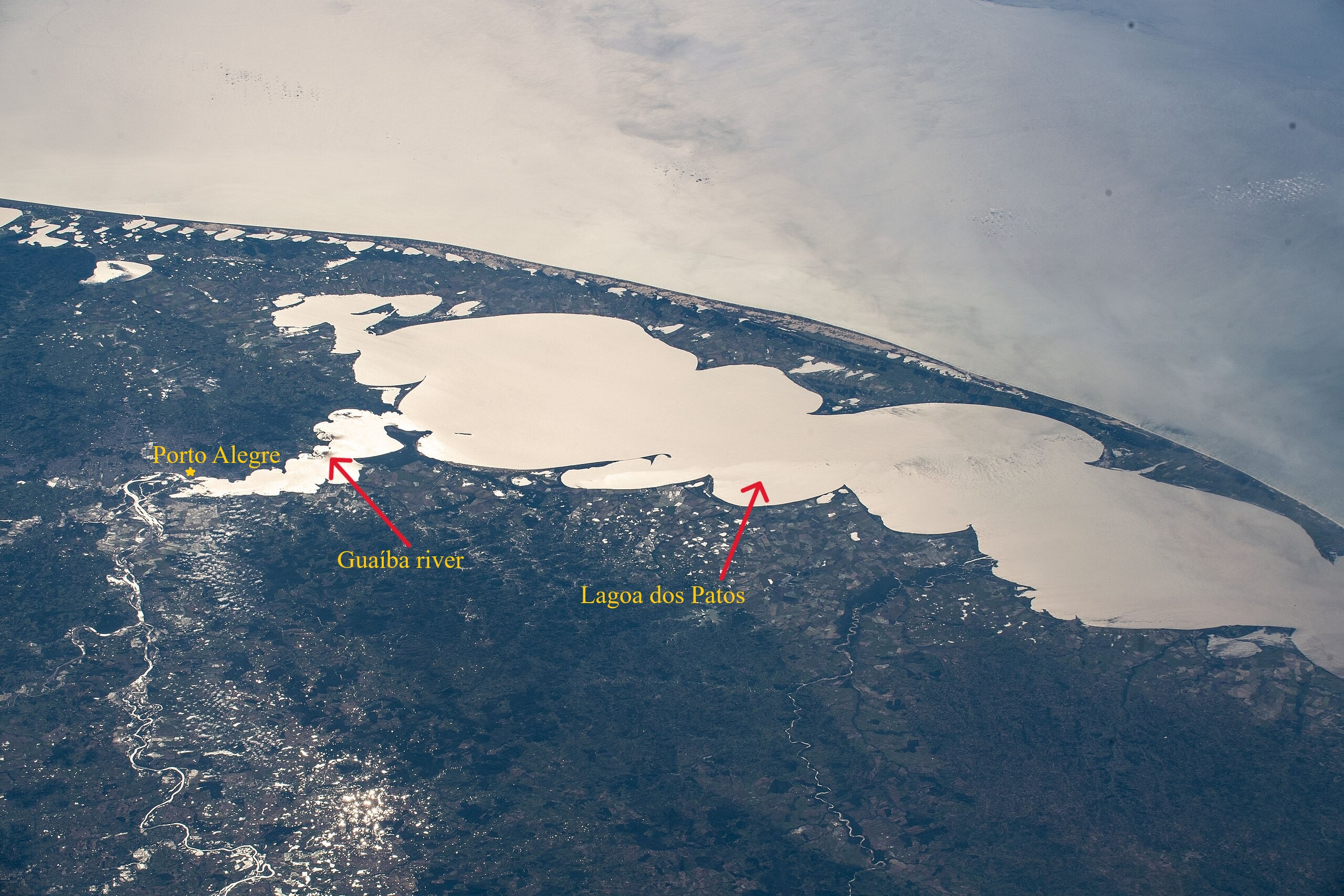
Aerial view of Lagoa dos Patos and Guaíba from the International Space Station, in 2019.

== Geography ==
The lagoon has average length and width of 290 km (180 mi) and 40 km (25 mi), respectively. It covers a surface of 10,100 km^{2} (3,900 mi^{2}), slightly smaller than Jamaica, and occupies nearly one third the area of the Coastal Plain of the state of Rio Grande do Sul. The lagoon roughly runs NE-SW, with an average depth of almost 6 m (20 ft), and mean tidal amplitude of 0.45 m. At its southern end, near Rio Grande city, the only inlet of Lagoa dos Patos has a mean discharge of 4,800 m^{3}/s (170,000 cu ft/s). Sea water penetrates northwards into the lagoon up to 200 km during exceptional conditions favored by southern winds, low water levels in the lagoon, and spring tides. The lagoon receives freshwater from about 201,626 km^{2} (77,848 mi^{2}), mostly from the catchment basin of the Guaíba River system, whose mouth is located in Porto Alegre - the Jacuí Delta - at the northwestern end of the lagoon. The coastal plain bordering the lagoon typically has elevations that reach up to 6 m, mostly consisting of sandy deposits interrupted by small inlets. Those spits rise in average 1 m above the mean water level and on the west margin of the lagoon their submerged part extends about 15 km into the water body.

== Tributaries ==
Major tributaries of the Lagoa dos Patos basin:

River	Mouth coordinates	Length (km)	Basin size (km^{2})	Average discharge (m^{3}/s)
Lake Guaiba
Jacuí	30°2′3.4548″S 51°14′45.546″W	723	82,618.1	2,327.3
Arroio Diluvio	30°2′50.928″S 51°14′3.678″W	17	355	1.9
Arroio do Conde	30°3′13.9284″S 51°18′6.3144″W		164.2	4.4
Arroio Petim	30°12′42.9444″S 51°19′16.5324″W		179.6	4.8
Arroio da Picada	30°17′0.3012″S 51°18′2.268″W		780.3	23.8
Arroio Araçá	30°19′30.7308″S 51°15′7.29″W		507.6	16.8
Lagoa dos Patos
Arroio Teixeira	30°40′12.6012″S 51°23′26.4948″W		131.7	4.3
Songa das Capivaras	30°42′41.8104″S 51°23′54.9888″W		222.6	7.3
Sanga do Quarenta	30°48′26.9172″S 51°23′42.2484″W		861.2	25.8
Arroio Velhaco	30°54′39.8664″S 51°29′41.8884″W		768.1	20
Camaquã	31°17′2.1588″S 51°44′38.0004″W	430	16,910.5	523.9
Arroio Caraá	31°21′12.6324″S 51°57′37.9296″W			4.1
Arroio São Lourenço	31°22′42.3084″S 51°57′57.6684″W		197.9	5
Arroio Turuçu	31°30′3.0852″S 52°0′28.5912″W		865.7	22.4
Arroio Corrientes	31°33′47.4264″S 52°6′20.934″W		666.1	16
São Gonçalo Channel	31°47′20.472″S 52°13′18.1488″W	76.6	56,220	1,184.5
Capivari	30°12′21.3768″S 50°32′36.1284″W		980.1	21.8
Palmares	30°15′23.8356″S 50°32′28.8888″W		295.3	5.8
Sanga Pangaré	30°28′28.8372″S 50°34′22.7136″W		246.2	5.9
Arroio Carneiro	31°8′21.8472″S 51°0′19.872″W		358.8	11.9

== Towns and cities on coast ==
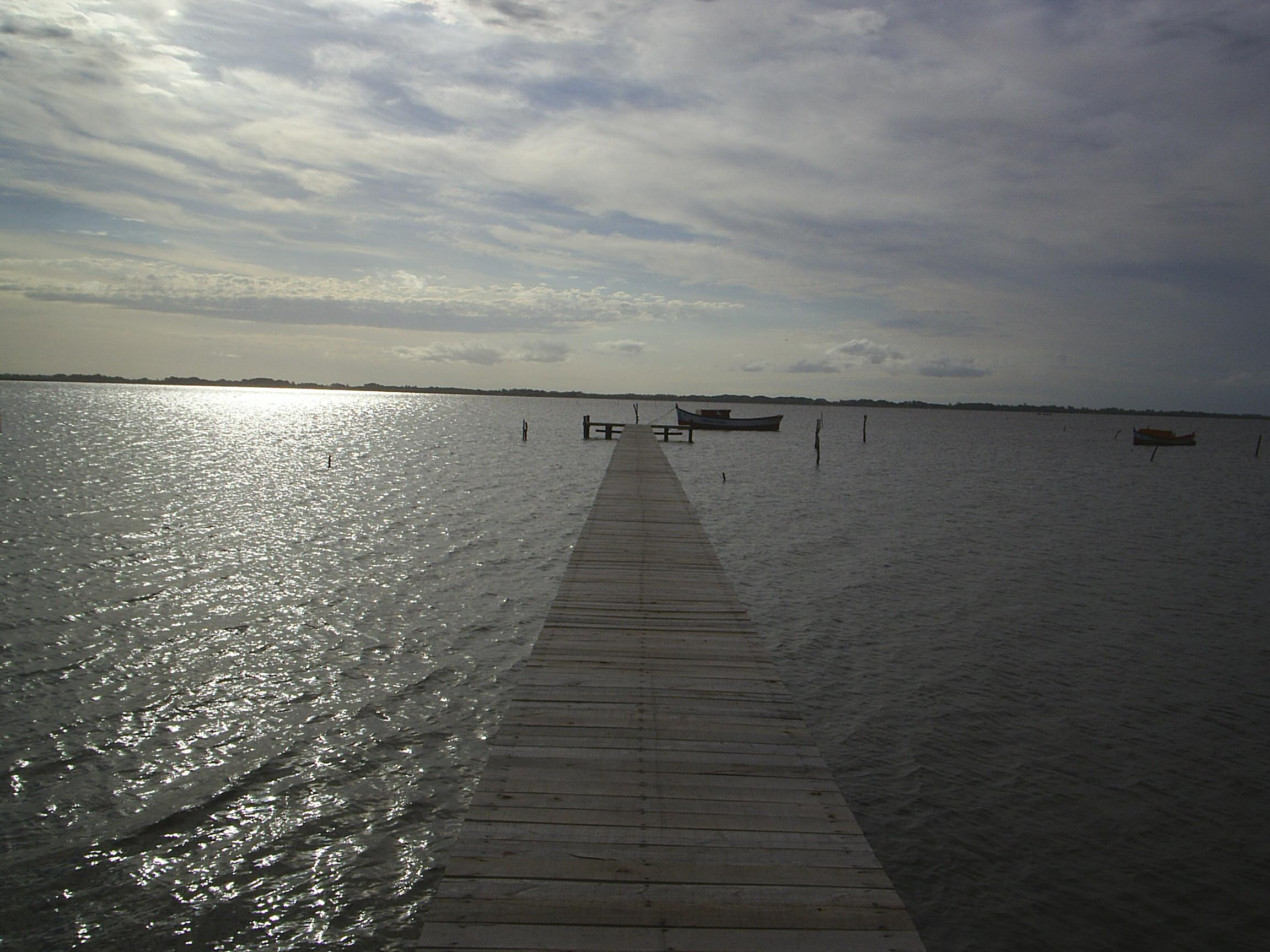
Pier extending from the Ilha dos Marinheiros into the lagoon

- Arambaré
- Rio Grande
- Pelotas
- Mostardas
- Tavares
- São José do Norte
- São Lourenço do Sul
- Tapes
