= Miss Brazil World 2014 =

- Date: August 9, 2014
- Presenters: Kamilla Salgado
- Entertainment: The Nash Brothers
- Venue: Costão do Santinho Resort, Florianópolis, Santa Catarina, Brazil
- Broadcaster: Redevida; TVCOM; TV UOL
- Entrants: 40
- Placements: 21
- Winner: Julia Gama; Rio Grande do Sul
- Congeniality: Luciana Novais; Goiás
- Photogenic: Isabel Correa; Ilhas de Búzios

Miss Brazil World 2014 was the 25th edition of the Miss Brazil World pageant and the 9th under MMB Productions & Events. The contest took place on August 9, 2014. Each state, the Federal District and various Insular Islands competed for the title. Sancler Frantz of Ilha dos Lobos crowned her successor, Julia Gama of Rio Grande do Sul at the end. Gama represented Brazil at Miss World 2014. The contest was held at the Costão do Santinho Resort in Florianópolis, Santa Catarina, Brazil.

== Results ==
Final results	Contestant
Miss Brazil World 2014	Rio Grande do Sul - Julia Gama
1st Runner-up	(Rio Grande do Sul) Ilha da Pintada - Vitória Strada
2nd Runner-up	(Rio Grande do Sul) Ilha dos Lobos - Vitória Bisognin
Top 10	Amazonas - Hanna Weiser; Ilhas de Búzios - Isabel Correa; Mato Grosso do Sul - Camila Nantes; Rio de Janeiro - Gabrielle Vilela; Santa Catarina - Elisa Freitas; São Paulo - Victória Ceotto; Sergipe - Rafaela Machado
Top 21	Alagoas - Camila Leão; (Amazonas (Brazilian state)) Anavilhanas Islands - Domênica Nepomuceno; Espírito Santo - Nathália Deon; Ilhabela - Greicy Kelly Nobre; (Paraná (state)) Ilha do Mel - Joana Marafon; Pará - Kíssia Oliveira; Paraíba - Camilla Gadelha; Paraná - Érica Henrique; Pernambuco - Andresa Alves; Porto Belo - Priscielle Carraro; Rondônia - Micheli Eggert

=== Regional Queens of Beauty ===
Award	Winner
Miss Midwest	Mato Grosso do Sul - Camila Nantes
Miss North	Amazonas - Hanna Weiser
Miss Northeast	Sergipe - Rafaela Machado
Miss South	Rio Grande do Sul - Julia Gama
Miss Southeast	São Paulo - Victória Ceotto

=== Special awards ===
Award	Winner
Best Face	Rio Grande do Sul - Julia Gama
Best Hair	Amazonas - Hanna Weiser
Best Skin	Maranhão - Nicolle Casagrande
Best Smile	Rio de Janeiro - Gabrielle Vilela
Miss Congeniality	Goiás - Luciana Novais
Miss Cordiality	Maranhão - Nicolle Casagrande
Miss Elegance	Rio Grande do Sul - Julia Gama
Miss Health & Fitness	Paraíba - Camilla Gadelha
Miss Photogenic	Ilhas de Búzios - Isabel Correa
Miss Popularity UOL	Rondônia - Micheli Eggert
Top Brazil	Amazonas - Hanna Weiser

== Challenge Events ==
=== Beach Beauty ===
Final results	Contestant
Winner	Rio Grande do Sul - Julia Gama
1st Runner-Up	Paraíba - Camilla Gadelha
2nd Runner-Up	Santa Catarina - Elisa Freitas

=== Beauty with a Purpose ===
Final results	Contestant
Winner	São Paulo - Victória Ceotto
1st Runner-Up	Rio Grande do Sul - Julia Gama
2nd Runner-Up	Paraná - Érica Henrique
Top 5	(Paraná (state)) Ilha do Mel - Joana Marafon; (Rio Grande do Sul) Ilha dos Lobos - Vitória Bisognin

=== Miss Multimedia ===
Final results	Contestant
Winner	Rio Grande do Sul - Julia Gama

=== Sports ===
Final results	Contestant
Winner	Rio de Janeiro - Gabrielle Vilela
1st Runner-Up	Paraná - Érica Henrique
2nd Runner-Up	(Paraná (state)) Ilha do Mel - Joana Marafon (tied)
2nd Runner-Up	Paraíba - Camilla Gadelha (tied)
Top 10	(Rio Grande do Sul) Ilha da Pintada - Vitória Strada; Mato Grosso do Sul - Camila Nantes; Minas Gerais - Eduarda D'Ávila; Pará - Kíssia Oliveira; Pernambuco - Andresa Alves; Porto Belo - Priscielle Carraro

=== Miss Talent ===
Final results	Contestant
Winner	Porto Belo - Priscielle Carraro
1st Runner-Up	Santa Catarina - Elisa Freitas
2nd Runner-Up	Ilhas de Búzios - Isabel Correa
Top 5	(Rio Grande do Sul) Ilha da Pintada - Vitória Strada; Rio Grande do Sul - Julia Gama
Top 10	Alagoas - Camila Leão; Bahia - Jéssica Alli; Ilha de Maracá - Claudine Kathleen; Paraná - Érica Henrique; Roraima - Carina Brendler

=== Top Model ===
Final results	Contestant
Winner (Three-Way tie)	Ilhas de Búzios - Isabel Correa; Rio Grande do Sul - Julia Gama; Santa Catarina - Elisa Freitas

== Delegates ==
The delegates for Miss Brazil World 2014 were:

=== States ===
- Acre - Tainá Menezes
- Alagoas - Camila Leão
- Amapá - Daiane Uchôa
- Amazonas - Hanna Weiser
- Bahia - Jéssica Alli
- Ceará - Natálya Braga
- Distrito Federal - Nicole Moreira
- Espírito Santo - Nathália Deon
- Goiás - Luciana Novais
- Maranhão - Nicolle Casagrande
- Mato Grosso - Jéssica Fiorenza
- Mato Grosso do Sul - Camila Nantes
- Minas Gerais - Eduarda D'Ávila
- Pará - Kíssia Oliveira
- Paraíba - Camilla Gadelha
- Paraná - Érica Henrique
- Pernambuco - Andresa Alves
- Rio de Janeiro - Gabrielle Vilela
- Rio Grande do Norte - Vanessa Medeiros
- Rio Grande do Sul - Julia Gama
- Rondônia - Micheli Eggert
- Roraima - Carina Brendler
- Santa Catarina - Elisa Freitas
- São Paulo - Victória Ceotto
- Sergipe - Rafaela Machado
- Tocantins - Fernanda Caixeta

=== Insular Regions ===
- (Amazonas (Brazilian state)) Anavilhanas Islands - Domênica Nepomuceno
- Florianópolis Islands - Gabriela Gerber
- Ilhabela - Greicy Kelly Nobre
- (Rio Grande do Sul) Ilha da Pintada - Vitória Strada
- Ilhas de Búzios - Isabel Correa
- Ilha de Maracá - Claudine Kathleen
- (Amapá) Ilha de Santana - Andréia Cordovil
- (Rio Grande do Sul) Ilhas do Guaíba - Marceli Viana
- (Paraná (state)) Ilha do Mel - Joana Marafon
- (Rio Grande do Sul) Ilha dos Lobos - Vitória Bisognin
- (Rio Grande do Sul) Ilha dos Marinheiros - Juliana Bohm
- (Pará) Marajó - Bianca Cardoso
- Porto Belo - Priscielle Carraro
- São Francisco do Sul - Emanuele Pamplona

== Did not compete ==
- Piauí
