= Miss Brazil World 2013 =

Beauty pageant edition

- Date: April 6, 2013
- Presenters: Chris Barth; Francisco Budal; Camila Serakides; Tamara Almeida
- Entertainment: Kim Lírio
- Venue: Portobello Resort & Safari, Mangaratiba, Rio de Janeiro, Brazil
- Broadcaster: TV UOL
- Entrants: 37
- Placements: 16
- Winner: Sancler Frantz (Rio Grande do Sul) Ilha dos Lobos
- Congeniality: Ilda Lando; Mato Grosso do Sul

Miss Brazil World 2013 was the 24th edition of the Miss Brazil World pageant and 8th under MMB Productions & Events. The contest took place on April 6, 2013. Each state, the Federal District and various Insular Regions & Cities competed for the title. Mariana Notarângelo of Rio de Janeiro crowned Sancler Frantz of Ilha dos Lobos at the end of the contest. Frantz represented Brazil at Miss World 2013. The contest was held at the Portobello Resort & Safari in Mangaratiba, Rio de Janeiro, Brazil.

== Results ==
| Final results | Contestant |
|---|---|
| Miss Brazil World 2013 | (Rio Grande do Sul) Ilha dos Lobos - Sancler Frantz |
| 1st Runner-up | Espírito Santo - Raquel Benetti |
| 2nd Runner-up | Santa Catarina - Tainara Latenik |
| Top 6 | Alagoas - Priscilla Durand; Rio de Janeiro - Gabriele Marinho; Rio Grande do Sul - Luciane Escouto |
| Top 16 | Acre - Vanessa Guimarães; Amazonas - Priscilla Rebelo; Florianópolis Islands - Sara Ramos; (Rio Grande do Sul) Ilha da Pintada - Tamara Bicca; (Paraná (state)) Ilha do Mel - Vivi Di Domênico; (Rio de Janeiro (state)) Ilha Grande - Gabrielle Vilela; Paraíba - Nathália Taveira; Pernambuco - Taynara Gargantini; Rio Grande do Norte - Heloiza Campos; São Paulo - Zaidan Ribeiro |

=== Regional Queens of Beauty ===
| Award | Winner |
|---|---|
| Miss Brazilian Islands | (Rio Grande do Sul) Ilha dos Lobos - Sancler Frantz |
| Miss Midwest | Distrito Federal - Graziela Souza |
| Miss North | Amazonas - Priscilla Rebelo |
| Miss Northeast | Alagoas - Priscilla Durand |
| Miss South | Santa Catarina - Tainara Latenik |
| Miss Southeast | Espírito Santo - Raquel Benetti |

=== Special awards ===
| Award | Winner |
|---|---|
| Best Skin | Alagoas - Priscilla Durand |
| Best Smile | (Rio Grande do Sul) Ilha dos Lobos - Sancler Frantz |
| Miss Congeniality | Mato Grosso do Sul - Ilda Lando |
| Miss Elegance | (Rio de Janeiro (state)) Ilha Grande - Gabrielle Vilela |
| Miss Popularity UOL | Santa Catarina - Tainara Latenik |

== Challenge Events ==
=== Beauty with a Purpose ===
| Final results | Contestant |
|---|---|
| Winner | Santa Catarina - Thainara Latenik |
| Top 5 | Amazonas - Priscilla Rebêlo; (Rio Grande do Sul) Ilha dos Lobos - Sancler Frantz; Minas Gerais - Adelaide Castro; Paraíba - Nathália Taveira |
| Top 26 | Acre - Vanessa Guimarães; Alagoas - Priscilla Durand; (São Paulo (state)) Alcatrazes - Aline Pierre; Amapá - Andrieli Rozin; (Rio Grande do Norte) Atol das Rocas - Flávia Fernandes; Ceará - Ruanna Fernandes; Distrito Federal - Graziela Souza; Espírito Santo - Raquel Benetti; Florianópolis Islands - Sara Ramos; (Pará) Ilha do Marajó - Fabyanne Nascimento; Mato Grosso - Ângela Trampusch; Pará - Thalita Maria Maués; Paraná - Talita Akemi Pan; Pernambuco - Taynara Gargantini; Piauí - Sueidys Peixoto; Rio Grande do Norte - Heloiza Campos; Rio Grande do Sul - Luciane Escouto; Roraima - Soraia Lustoza; São Paulo - Zaidan Ribeiro; Sergipe - Ingrid Moraes; Tocantins - Natasha Paixão |

=== Beach Beauty ===
| Final results | Contestant |
|---|---|
| Winner | Santa Catarina - Thainara Latenik |
| 1st Runner-Up | Rio Grande do Sul - Luciane Escouto |
| 2nd Runner-Up | (Rio Grande do Sul) Ilha dos Lobos - Sancler Frantz |
| Top 10 | Alagoas - Priscilla Durand; Amazonas - Priscilla Rebêlo; Espírito Santo - Raquel Benetti; Florianópolis Islands - Sara Ramos; Paraná - Talita Akemi Pan; Piauí - Sueidys Peixoto; Rio de Janeiro - Gabriele Marinho |

=== Miss Talent ===
| Final results | Contestant |
|---|---|
| Winner | Santa Catarina - Thainara Latenik |
| 1st Runner-Up | Mato Grosso do Sul - Paula Gomes |
| 2nd Runner-Up | Amazonas - Priscilla Rebêlo |
| Top 10 | Acre - Vanessa Guimarães; Espírito Santo - Raquel Benetti; Goiás - Lílian Leite; Ilhabela - Marcella Araki; Mato Grosso - Ângela Trampusch; Pernambuco - Taynara Gargantini; Tocantins - Natasha Paixão |

=== Miss Top Model ===
| Final results | Contestant |
|---|---|
| Winner | (Rio Grande do Sul) Ilha dos Lobos - Sancler Frantz |
| 1st Runner-Up | Espírito Santo - Raquel Benetti |
| 2nd Runner-Up (tied) | Paraíba - Nathália Taveira |
| 2nd Runner-Up (tied) | Rio Grande do Norte - Heloiza Campos |
| Top 9 | (Rio Grande do Sul) Ilha da Pintada - Tamara Bicca; (Paraná (state)) Ilha do Mel - Vivi Di Domênico; Mato Grosso - Ângela Trampusch; Pernambuco - Taynara Gargantini; Santa Catarina - Thainara Latenik |

=== Multimedia ===
| Final results | Contestant |
|---|---|
| Winner | Amazonas - Priscilla Rebêlo |
| 1st Runner-Up | Pernambuco - Taynara Gargantini |
| 2nd Runner-Up | (São Paulo (state)) Alcatrazes - Aline Pierre |

=== Sports ===
| Final results | Contestant |
|---|---|
| Winner | (Rio de Janeiro (state)) Ilha Grande - Gabrielle Vilela |
| 1st Runner-Up (tied) | Florianópolis Islands - Sara Ramos |
| 1st Runner-Up (tied) | (Pará) Ilha do Marajó - Fabyanne Nascimento |
| Top 11 | (São Paulo (state)) Alcatrazes - Aline Pierre; (Rio Grande do Norte) Atol das Rocas - Flávia Fernandes; Distrito Federal - Graziela Souza; Ilhabela - Marcella Araki; (Rio Grande do Sul) Ilha da Pintada - Tamara Bicca; (Paraná (state)) Ilha do Mel - Vivi Di Domênico; (Rio Grande do Sul) Ilha dos Lobos - Sancler Frantz; (Rio Grande do Sul) Ilha dos Marinheiros - Maria Lua Strëit |

== Delegates ==
The delegates for Miss Brazil World 2013 were:

=== States ===
- Acre - Vanessa Guimarães
- Alagoas - Priscilla Durand
- Amapá - Raíssa Machado
- Amazonas - Priscilla Rebêlo
- Bahia - Nicole Müller
- Ceará - Ruanna Fernandes
- Distrito Federal - Graziela Souza
- Espírito Santo - Raquel Benetti
- Goiás - Lilian Leite
- Maranhão - Isadora Macêdo
- Mato Grosso - Ângela Trampusch
- Mato Grosso do Sul - Ilda Lando
- Minas Gerais - Adelaine Castro
- Pará - Thalita Maués
- Paraíba - Nathália Taveira
- Paraná - Talita Akemi Pan
- Pernambuco - Taynara Gargantini
- Piauí - Sueidys Peixoto
- Rio de Janeiro - Gabriele Marinho
- Rio Grande do Norte - Heloiza Campos
- Rio Grande do Sul - Luciane Escouto
- Rondônia - Patrícia Balbi
- Roraima - Soraia Lustoza
- Santa Catarina - Thainara Latenik
- São Paulo - Zaidan Ribeiro
- Sergipe - Ingrid Vieira
- Tocantins - Natasha Marinho

=== Insular Regions ===
- (São Paulo (state)) Alcatrazes - Aline Pierre
- (Rio Grande do Norte) Atol das Rocas - Flávia Fernandes
- Florianópolis Islands - Sara Ramos
- Ilhabela - Marcela Yamaguti
- (Rio Grande do Sul) Ilha da Pintada - Tamara Bicca
- (Pará) Ilha do Marajó - Fabyane Nascimento
- (Paraná (state)) Ilha do Mel - Viviane Di Domênico
- (Rio Grande do Sul) Ilha dos Lobos - Sancler Frantz
- (Rio Grande do Sul) Ilha dos Marinheiros - Maria Lua Strëit
- (Rio de Janeiro (state)) Ilha Grande - Gabrielle Vilela
