= Miss Brazil World 2011 =

- Date: August 13, 2011
- Presenters: Chris Barth; Francisco Budal; Osyanne Pilecco
- Venue: Hotel do Fradei, Angra dos Reis, Rio de Janeiro, Brazil
- Broadcaster: TV UOL; TV Pampa
- Entrants: 34
- Placements: 18
- Winner: Juceila Bueno; Rio Grande do Sul
- Congeniality: Benazira Djoco; Paraíba
- Photogenic: Késsia Cortez; Rio Grande do Norte

Miss Brazil World 2011 was the 22nd edition of the Miss Brazil World pageant and 6th under MMB Productions & Events. The contest took place on August 13, 2011. Each state, the Federal District and various Insular Regions competed for the title. Kamilla Salgado of Pará crowned Juceila Bueno of Rio Grande do Sul at the end of the contest. Bueno represented Brazil at Miss World 2011. The contest was held at the Hotel do Frade in Angra dos Reis, Rio de Janeiro, Brazil.

== Results ==
| Final results | Contestant |
|---|---|
| Miss Brazil World 2011 | Rio Grande do Sul - Juceila Bueno |
| 1st Runner-Up | Sergipe - Mariane Silvestre |
| 2nd Runner-Up | São Paulo - Ana Cecília Cunha |
| 3rd Runner-Up | Santa Catarina - Mariana Bathke |
| 4th Runner-Up | Rio Grande do Norte - Késsia Cortez |
| Top 11 | Distrito Federal - Kellin Schmidt; Espírito Santo - Rhaíssa Siviero; (Rio Grande do Sul) Ilha da Pintada - Vanessa Koetz; (Pará) Ilha do Marajó - Aline Reis; Minas Gerais - Juliane Késsia; Tocantins - Camila Serakides |
| Top 18 | Alagoas - Daniella Borçato; Bahia - Paloma Vega; (Rio Grande do Sul) Ilha dos Marinheiros - Paula Helwanger; Mato Grosso - Mariana Albuquerque; Pernambuco - Luzielle Vasconcelos; Piauí - Kahuany Tufaile; Rio de Janeiro - Stefanie Figueiredo |

=== Regional Queens of Beauty ===
| Award | Winner |
|---|---|
| Miss Brazilian Islands | (Pará) Ilha do Marajó - Aline Reis |
| Miss Midwest | Distrito Federal - Kellin Schmidt |
| Miss North | Tocantins - Camila Serakides |
| Miss Northeast | Sergipe - Mariane Silvestre |
| Miss South | Rio Grande do Sul - Juceila Bueno |
| Miss Southeast | São Paulo - Ana Cecília Cunha |

=== Special awards ===
| Award | Winner |
|---|---|
| Miss Blogger UOL | Maranhão - Nataly Uchôa |
| Miss Congeniality | Paraíba - Benazira Djoco |
| Miss Cordiality | Alagoas - Daniella Borçato |
| Miss Elegance | Ilha de Porto Belo - Dionara Lermen |
| Miss Photogenic | Rio Grande do Norte - Késsia Cortez |
| Miss Press | (Rio Grande do Sul) Ilha dos Lobos - Andressa Mello |

== Challenge Events ==
=== Beauty with a Purpose ===
| Final results | Contestant |
|---|---|
| Winner | (Rio Grande do Sul) Ilha dos Marinheiros - Paula Helwanger |
| 1st Runner-Up | Rio Grande do Sul - Juceila Bueno |
| 2nd Runner-Up | São Paulo - Ana Cecília Cunha |
| Top 5 | Amazonas - Renata Reis Mendes; Tocantins - Camila Serakides |

=== Beach Beauty Brazil ===
| Final results | Contestant |
|---|---|
| Winner | Santa Catarina - Mariana Bathke |
| 1st Runner-Up | Rio Grande do Sul - Juceila Bueno |
| 2nd Runner-Up | Pará - Priscila Winny |

=== Best Model Brazil ===
| Final results | Contestant |
|---|---|
| Winner | Rio Grande do Sul - Juceila Bueno |
| 1st Runner-Up | Sergipe - Mariane Silvestre |
| 2nd Runner-Up (tied) | Minas Gerais - Juliane Késsia |
| 2nd Runner-Up (tied) | Rio Grande do Norte - Késsia Cortez |

=== Miss Creativity ===
| Final results | Contestant |
|---|---|
| Winner | Pernambuco - Luzielle Vasconcelos |
| 1st Runner-Up | Rio Grande do Sul - Juceila Bueno |
| 2nd Runner-Up (tied) | Piauí - Kahuany Tufaile |
| 2nd Runner-Up (tied) | Santa Catarina - Mariana Bathke |

=== Miss Popularity UOL ===
| Final results | Contestant |
|---|---|
| Winner | Pernambuco - Luzielle Vasconcelos |

=== Miss Sportswoman Brazil ===
| Final results | Contestant |
|---|---|
| Winner | Mato Grosso - Mariana Albuquerque |
| 1st Runner-Up | Piauí - Kahuany Tufaile |
| 2nd Runner-Up | Amazonas - Renata Reis Mendes |
| Top 9 | Alagoas - Daniella Borçato; Amapá - Josilene Modesto; Ceará - Beatriz Sousa; Espírito Santo - Rhaíssa Siviero; Maranhão - Nataly Uchôa; Mato Grosso do Sul - Thaiany Bittencourt |

=== Miss Talent ===
| Final results | Contestant |
|---|---|
| Winner | Tocantins - Camila Serakides |
| 1st Runner-Up | Rio Grande do Norte - Késsia Cortez |
| 2nd Runner-Up (tied) | Maranhão - Nataly Uchôa |
| 2nd Runner-Up (tied) | São Paulo - Ana Cecília Cunha |

== Delegates ==
The delegates for Miss Brazil World 2011 were:

=== States ===
- Acre - Thaís Lianne
- Alagoas - Daniella Borçato
- Amapá - Josilene Modesto
- Amazonas - Renata Reis Mendes
- Bahia - Paloma Vega
- Ceará - Beatriz Sousa
- Distrito Federal - Kellin Schmidt
- Espírito Santo - Rhaíssa Siviero
- Goiás - Evellyn Barbosa
- Maranhão - Nataly Uchôa
- Mato Grosso - Mariana Albuquerque
- Mato Grosso do Sul - Thaiany Bittencourt
- Minas Gerais - Juliane Késsia
- Pará - Priscila Winny
- Paraíba - Benazira Djoco
- Paraná - Adrielly Barron
- Pernambuco - Luzielle Vasconcelos
- Piauí - Kahuany Tufaile
- Rio de Janeiro - Stefanie Figueiredo
- Rio Grande do Norte - Késsia Cortez
- Rio Grande do Sul - Juceila Bueno
- Santa Catarina - Mariana Bathke
- São Paulo - Ana Cecília Cunha
- Sergipe - Mariane Silvestre
- Tocantins - Camila Serakides

=== Insular Regions ===
- (Bahia) Abrolhos - Juliana Nascimento
- Fernando de Noronha - Mayra Albuquerque
- Florianópolis Islands - Sophia Scarlett
- (Rio Grande do Sul) Ilha da Pintada - Vanessa Koetz
- (Pará) Ilha do Marajó - Aline Reis
- Ilha de Porto Belo - Dionara Lermen
- (Espírito Santo) Ilha de Vitória - Mariana Lopes
- (Rio Grande do Sul) Ilha dos Lobos - Andressa Mello
- (Rio Grande do Sul) Ilha dos Marinheiros - Paula Helwanger

== Notes ==
=== Did not compete ===
- Rondônia
- Roraima
