= Alcatrazes Islands =

Archipelago off the coast of São Paulo state, Brazil

Coordinates: 24.101°S 45.691°W

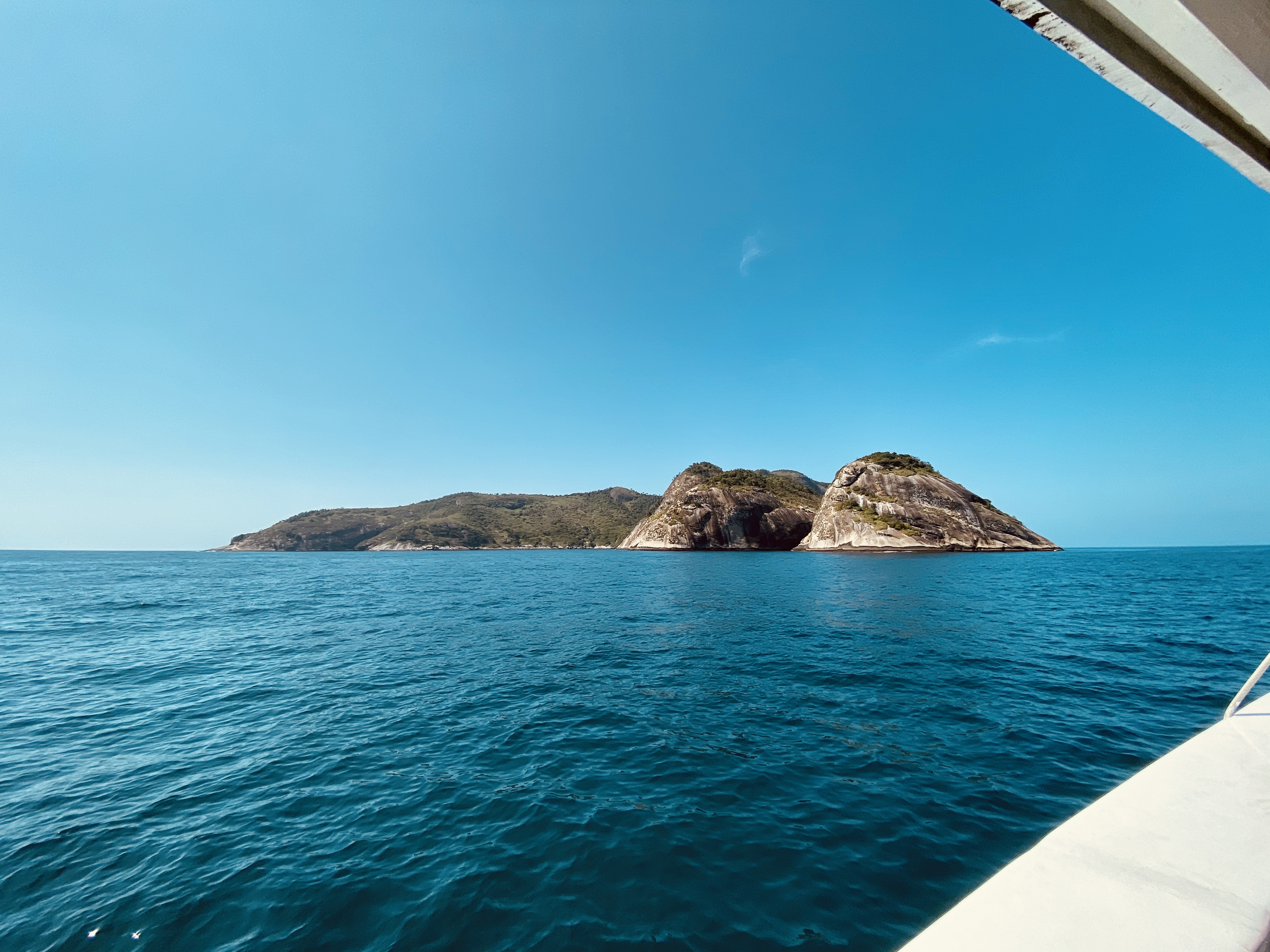
The largest island in the archipelago, "Alcatrazes Island"

Alcatrazes is a Brazilian archipelago, located some 35 km south of São Sebastião, in the northern coast of the State of São Paulo, one hour away by boat, approximately. It is protected by the largest marine integral conservation unit of Brazil after the Abrolhos Marine National Park. In 2023, it was a recipient of the Blue Park gold level award for its "exceptional conservation of marine life during the 5th International Congress of Protected Sea Areas.

The islands have been receiving an increasing number of researchers and possess unparalleled importance for the Brazilian marine biodiversity, having more variety of fish than Fernando de Noronha.

== Etymology ==
The name of the archipelago comes from a bird which forms its second largest bird population, with some three thousand specimens: the brown booby, which is also known as "alcatraz", a word that in Arabic means "the diver", due to its ability to dive into the sea to capture fishes or squids.

== Geography ==
=== Geology ===
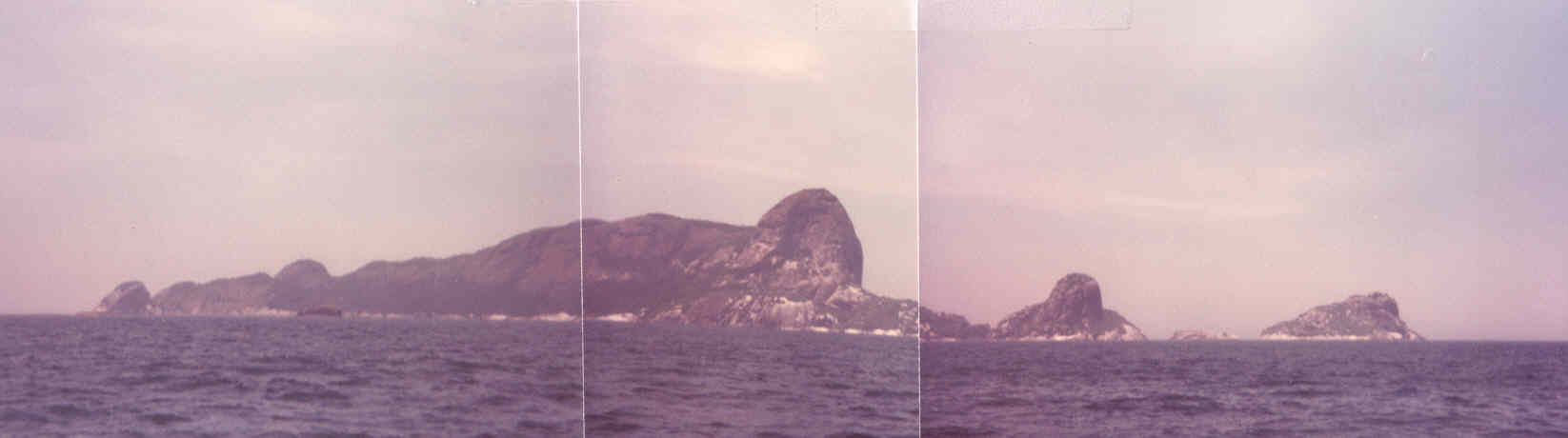
Reproduction of a montage of pictures of the archipelago.

The geomorphology of Alcatrazes is characterized by sandy sediments with less silt and clay. The archipelago consists of a biotite porphyritic granite.

The islands are believed to present their very current format since at least 2.5 million years ago. However, during the last glacial period (in between 85 thousand and 15 thousand years ago), the sea water was receded in such a way that the archipelago was actually a mountain still connected to the continent.

Alcatrazes is formed by five main islands. The biggest one is known as Alcatrazes Island (2.5 km long with an area of 170 hectares (420 acres)) and the other ones are called da Sapata, do Paredão, do Porto (or do Farol) and do Sul. There are also four unnamed islets; five lajes (Dupla, Singela, do Paredão, do Farol and Negra); and two placers (Nordeste and Sudeste). Its depth can reach 50m. Its total oceanic coverage is of 67,000 hectares (170,000 acres).

The highest point of the archipelago is the Boa Vista (or dos Alcatrazes) Peak, 316 m high. Another peak is do Oratório at 154 m. The islands' faces are marked by rocky, steep walls that can reach up to 200 metres (660 ft) in height. Between the southern and eastern arms of the main island is the Saco do Funil, the most protected part of the island and the place where the Brazilian Navy used to practice shooting (see details in the "History" section below).

The Farol Island, also known as Porto Island, has a 7m tall lighthouse (hence its name; "farol" is Portuguese for lighthouse).

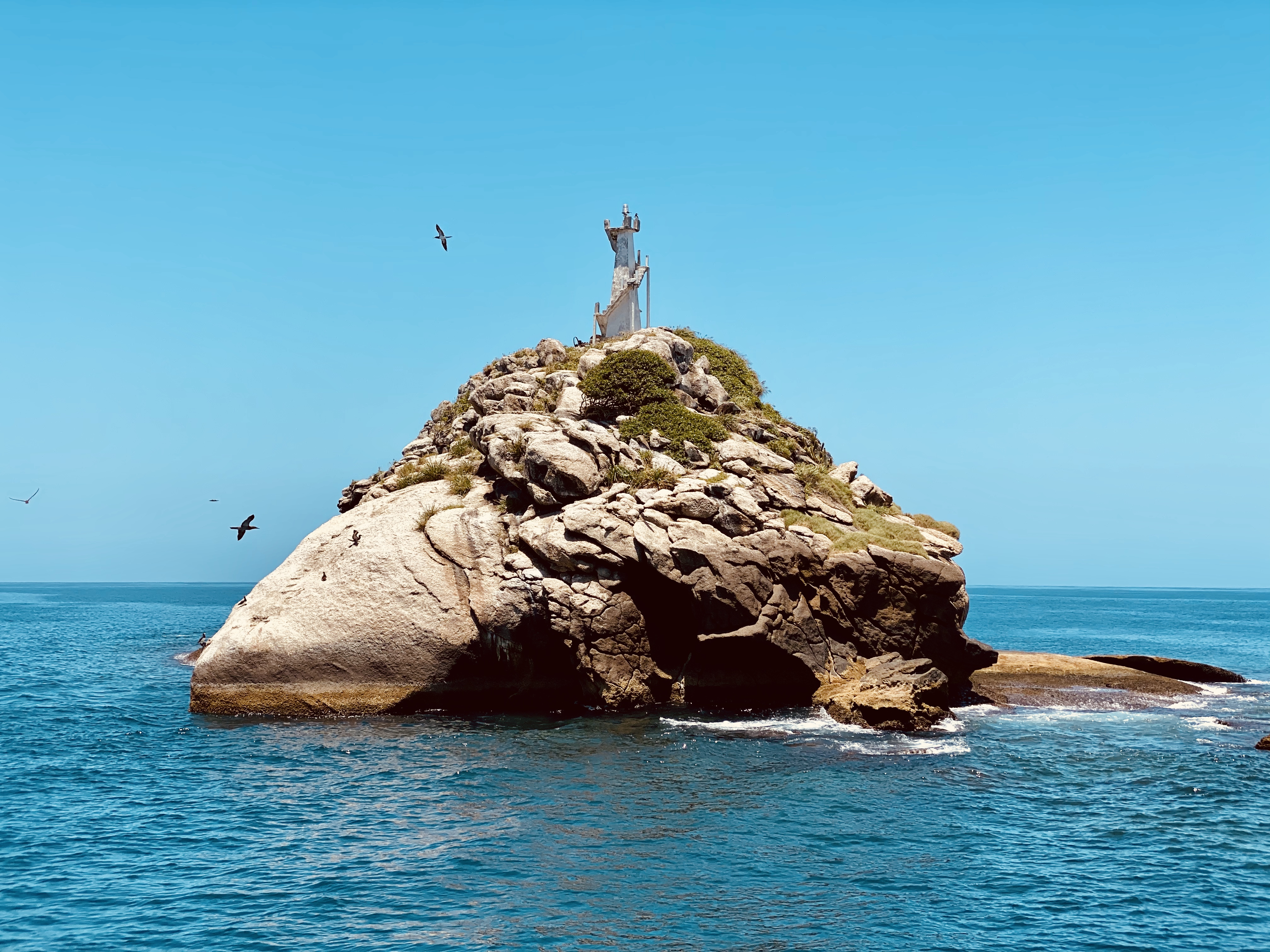
One of the smaller islands, "Ilha do Farol".

=== Biodiversity ===
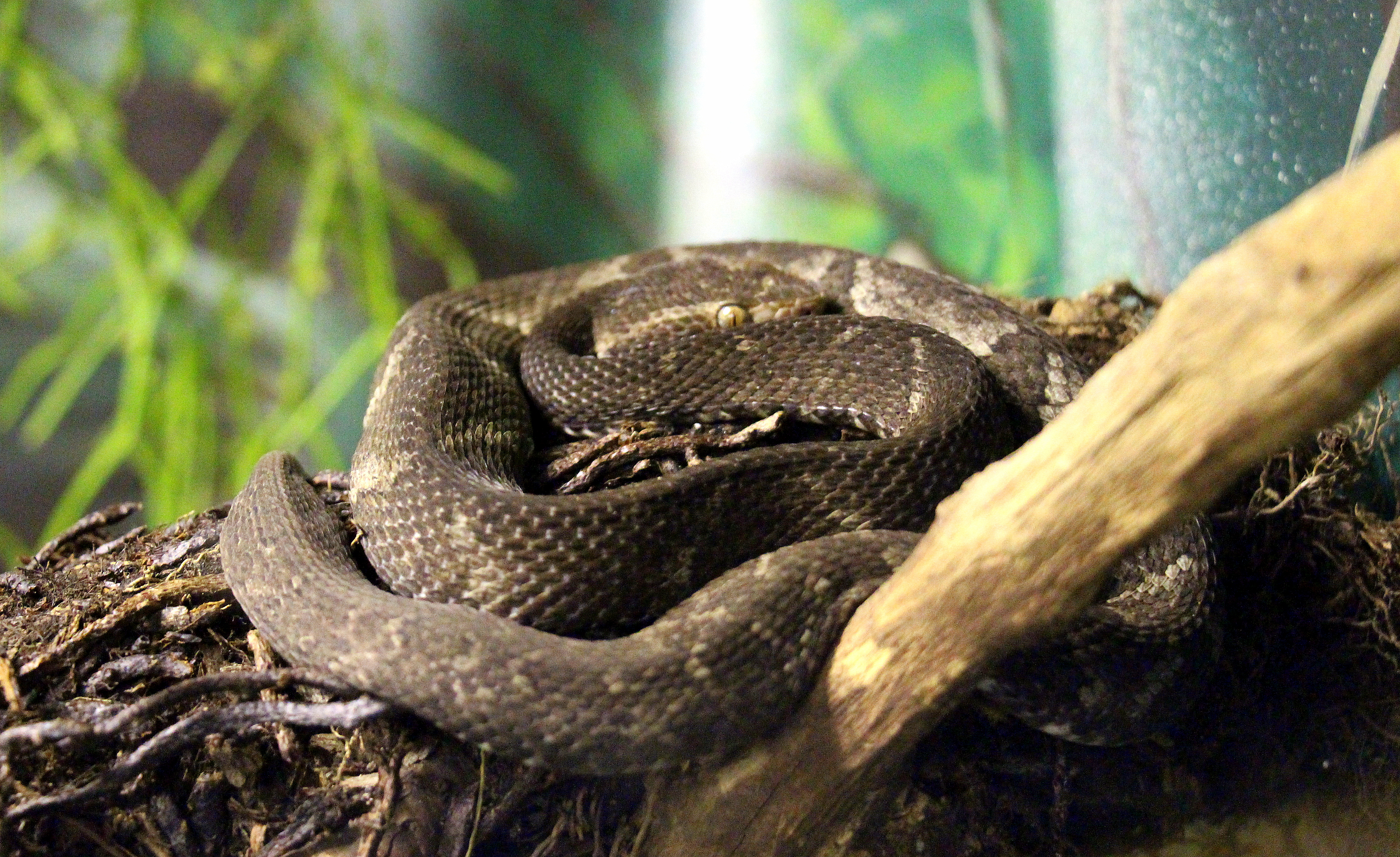
Bothrops alcatraz, one of the endemic species of the archipelago.

Alcatrazes possesses rich fauna and flora; by December 2019, 1,3 thousand species had been registered there, 93 of which were deemed endangered and 20 were endemic, including the Bothrops alcatraz, the Scinax alcatraz and the true frog Cycloramphus faustoi. Among the endemic plants, there's the Anthurium alcatrazensis, the Begonia venosa and the Sinningia insularis (also endemic to Recife Hill, in São Sebastião), besides the Begonia larorum, collected only once and never found again there; it's deemed extinct now.

Other endemic species yet to be discovered are believed to exist there, including a species of coral snake which two only known individuals were lost during the fire at the Instituto Butantan.

Such occurrence of endemism lead the archipelago to be nicknamed "the Galápagos of Brazil" by some researchers, who believe Charles Darwin would have come to the same conclusions he came to in the Equatorian archipelago had he studied the fauna of Alcatrazes. As described in the sub-section "Geology" above, the islands were for tens of thousands of years linked to the continent, which provided easy access to the place for several species. As the waters rose again and the mountains returned to their island status, the animals that were stranded there either died or adapted and evolved, giving birth to all those unique species which resulted from 11,000 years of genetic isolate.

On the main island there is the world's biggest cluster of frigatebirds' nests, with a gathering of 6,000 individuals. Some 10 to 20,000 birds live in the archipelago, with over 100 different confirmed species (another source speaks of 92), including endangered ones like the American oystercatcher and the South American tern The colonizing expedition led by Martim Afonso de Sousa between 1530 and 1532 already took note of bird sightings in the place, and the one led by Luederwaldt & Fonseca in 1920 catalogued 39 additional species, of which 17 were deemed resident. Between the 1990s and the 2000s, further expeditions of the Alcatrazes Project raised the numbers to 103 and 37, respectively. 11 are considered endangered.

In the waters surrounding the archipelago, several species live among the grooved brain corals, including 400 species of invertebrates and between 200 and 250 species of fish, 40 of which considered endangered; another source speaks of exactly 160 catalogued species (in 2017) and yet another one from the same year speaks of 259, 47 of which are endangered to some extent. This number of fish is superior to anywhere else in Brazil, including the much bigger Fernando de Noronha archipelago, with 150 species. The place is also visited by green sea turtles and Hawksbill sea turtles and by cetaceans, including dolphins, Bryde's whales, Humpback whales and southern right whales. The not so long nor so short distance between island and continent combined with the fact that it is located in a transition zone of warm tropical waters to colder subtropical ones make for the big diversity of fishes.

There are other species of corals in the region, including the Ceriantheomorphe brasiliensis, considered endangered.

18 species of butterflies and 48 of spiders, ten species of sponges (including the species Latrunculia janeirensis, which was previously though to be endemic to the Cagarras Islands), 60 species of molluscs, 59 species of polychaete (including the endangered Eurythoe complanata), 50 species of crustaceans (this number refers to the whole ESEC Tupinambás, which includes areas close to Anchieta Island, 20 species of echinoderm (six deemed endangered, 10 species of bryozoa and 24 species of sea squirts have been catalogued in Alcatrazes.

The sea around the islands would not receive much attention until the 1990s, because diving was not yet regarded as a true scientific tool in Brazil. It was in the archipelago that such reality began to change.

Beside the Navy exercises, another threat to the local ecosystem is the sea pollution, be it from chemical dejects (which contaminate the plankton and, consequently, the whole food chain involved with it) or incorrectly disposed waste. The invasive orange cup coral is another risk to the local fauna. They were first detected in 2011 and, since then, they are monitored and removed so they do not become a plague, although its eradication is no longer considered possible to achieve. The species is native to the Indo-Pacific and first arrived in Brazil in 1990. In the neighboring island of Búzios, which belongs to the city of Ilhabela, the coral has already caused significant damage.

The islands are essentially covered by the Atlantic Forest, more specifically characterized by dense ombrophilous forest, but becomes more analogous to the cerrado in the higher parts. There are 130 catalogued species of plants there, including four endemic species: two begonias, one anthurium and one gloxinia, the latter is also known as "abyss queen", since it blossoms at the edge of cliffs.

=== Climate ===
Influenced by the South Atlantic High, the archipelago experiences hot and humid summers and dry, moderate winters.

=== Oceanography ===
The waters around the archipelago present a chemical composition which favors the local ecosystem by the photic zone.

== History ==
2,5 million years ago, Alcatrazes was a mountain covered and surrounded with Atlantic Forest, and not an island. For around 65 thousand years one could simply walk from where today lies the municipality of São Sebastião to Alcatrazes.

Due to that, archeological remains indicate Alcatrazes was visited by pre-Columbian peoples. Its first known visitors, Tupinambá people, named the place "Uraritã" ("land of birds"). There are five archeological sites in the island, with remains of precolonial peoples and ruins dating back to the early 20th century - these are what's left of some buildings that would serve local lighthouse keepers. These attempts to occupy the islands produced the first significant impacts in the local flora, which is now recovering in the spaces that were previously deforested.

With the end of the last ice age, sea levels rose again and Alcatrazes was isolated from the continent.

After Brazil's colonization by the Portuguese, Alcatrazes's first mention comes from 1530, on Pero Lopes de Souza's diary. Souza was one of the leaders of the first Portuguese expedition assembled to take over the new colony. The group used the place to collect fish and wood before resuming their journey towards the south of Brazil.

In the 18th century, the main island was used by fishermen and caiçaras for fishing, shelter and guano extraction, producing through the latter efforts a valuable fertilizer. Such exploitation was also detected in the 1950s.

The first and only building in the island is a house possibly built in the beginning of the 20th century to provide shelter to a keeper of the archipelago. One of the first scientific expeditions to the place took place in 1915, by the São Paulo Geographic and Geological Commission. In 1920 or 1922, another visit, led by Luederwaldt & Fonseca (from the Museum of Zoology of the University of São Paulo), took place in partnership with Instituto Butantan. In his visit, Luederwaldt registered plantations and two small harbors for fishermen. Among the cultivated food, there were avocado, cassava, bananas, sweet potato, lima bean, corn, marvel of Peru, castor bean, tayá, sugar cane and orange, besides cotton - all of which are invasive species. In this month-long expedition, Luderwaldt collected many specimens for studies, some of which are still in the herbarium of the São Paulo Botanical Institute. Visits from scientists would only become more frequent in the 1980s, which is when the local flora and fauna started to be more well known; materials collected in these visits can also be found at the institute. It was also in that time that, due to the creation of the Conservation Units and the restricted use by the Brazilian Navy that the preservation of the regional started to be assured and turned the archipelago in a prominent scientific research site, due to the low interference by men.

=== Navy exercises ===
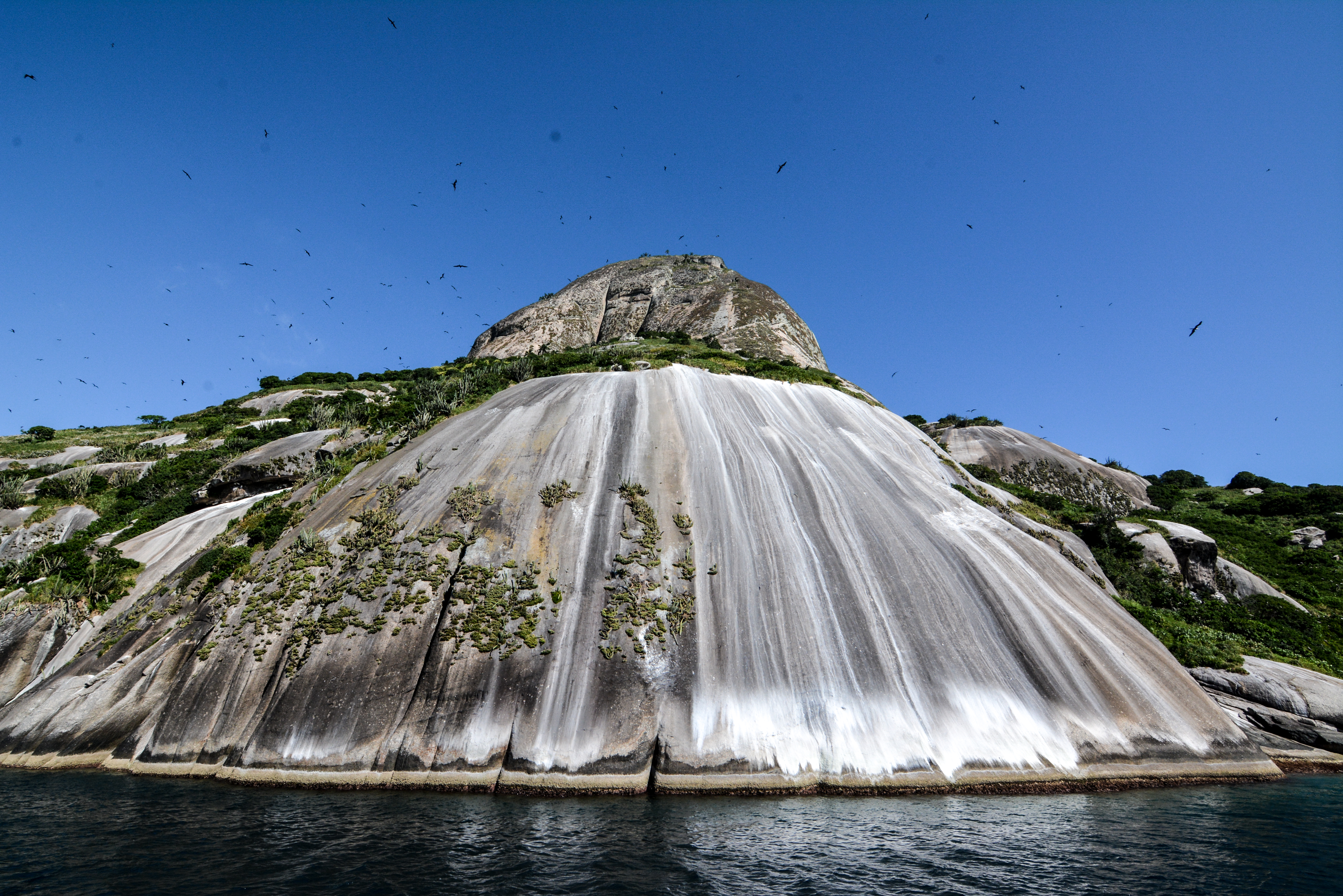
One of the large rock walls where the military practiced shooting.

Until the 1980s, the Brazilian Navy had to sail to Puerto Rico to carry out shooting sessions with its ships. The elevated costs of such trips prompted the military to search for a proper place at the Brazilian coast. They eventually came up with three potential archipelagos: Alcatrazes, Fernando de Noronha and Abrolhos. Alcatrazes was ultimately chosen due to the lower anticipated environmental impact and its proximity to Rio de Janeiro, where the fleet is kept moored.

The shots, however, caused considerable environmental damage, motivating a number of lawsuits willing to cease them, although some researchers admit that the military presence helped protect the islands from fishermen.

The shooting practices caused fires in the island, which impacted the local ecosystems, destroyed around 12% of the original vegetation and paved the way for the proliferation of the invasive molasses grass, which is susceptible to more fires. Even species that are native to the island, such as the Imperata brasiliensis and the Pteridium arachnoideum, demonstrated aggressive behavior in areas that suffered human interference.

In 1989, environmentalists concerned with the damage started to promote visits to the islands to gather as much information as possible and show the extension of the damage the Navy was causing. In doing so, they expected to convince the military to stop. Until then, the last registered trip to the archipelago dated from 1920.

At that time, the Navy promised to carry out studies of their own to determine the impact of the shots in the local ecosystem and the analysis confirmed the damage. In the meantime, then congressman Fábio Feldmann proposed a law that created the Marine National Park of Alcatrazes in 1990. The shooting exercises continued and were only interrupted between 1991 and 1998 by a court decision. In 1998, environmentalists protested with the help of Greenpeace right at one of the targets before one more exercise was carried out.

In 2004, one shot caused a wildfire that consumed 20 hectares of the main island's plants, which gave a new momentum to Feldmann's proposal, but it wasn't until 2013 that the Navy finally agreed with the creation of a park, as long as the Sapata Island (with an area of 4 hectares), to the northeast of the main island, was excluded from the park so they could keep firing there. The Navy sustains that the exercises are "essential to the training of the troops and the alignment of the cannons of the fleet", and that Alcatrazes is the only proper place for such trainings. Since then, and after an environmental impact assessment conducted by a joint team of researchers from the Environment and Defence Ministries, the exercises take place only once per year.

=== Status and preservation ===
When the Navy took over the place in the 1980s, visitation to the island was forbidden. Diving, even for leisure purposes, was also forbidden until 2016; it would only be allowed for special purposes, such as researching. Transgressors could be charged by the Navy with fines ranging from R$40 to R$2,200, or by ICMBio, with fines ranging from R$700 to R$100,000.

Since 1987, a small part of the island was, in theory, protected by the federal government in the form of the Tupinambás Ecological Station (which also contemplated a part of the Ilha Anchieta State Park), although there was no personnel or resources in the archipelago to prevent it from being harmed and although that particular area was not hit by the Navy fires.

In March 2012, the deputy mayor of São Sebastião, Wagner Teixeira (PV) was caught committing illegal fishing near the Paredão Island. He was at his personal boat with five more men, and didn't stop until his engine ran out of oil, even with the coast guard on his tail with the sirens on. He was carrying 116 kg of fish, including endangered species, and stated he wasn't aware of the prohibition of fishing in that area. In a later interview, he said that he only ran out of fuel after he agreed to return to the continent with the inspectors. He also said he wasn't aware the area was protected and that he always fought for the archipelago's preservation.

In 2016, Alcatrazes received Wild Life Refuge status and had its protection area increased so the whole archipelago is included (except for the Sapata Island, as explained in the sub-section "Navy exercises" above), totalizing 673 km^{2} or 67.409 hectares – a size met with criticism by some environmentalists, who predict too high a cost to watch over the whole area. Fishing and deforesting remain forbidden, but at that time boat rides and diving were planned to be opened to the public, according to criteria to be defined in a management plan.

In September 2017, it was determined that the waters surrounding the islands would be, indeed, opened for boat rides and diving, but docking at the islands would not be an option due to the lack of beaches and other safe places for that. Visitations, which were to be exclusively promoted by companies authorized by ICMBio, were expected to begin in 2018, with the year of 2017 reserved to the preparation for the activities (registration of companies, trainings and issuing of licenses). A 60-foot boat would be installed at the island and would stay there all time to facilitate research and protection. Some researchers support touristic visitation to the archipelago, sustaining that the constant presence of people may discourage illegal fishing.

In December, Alcatrazes was finally opened to the public for free-of-cost visitation. One year later, around a thousand people had dived in its waters, with an average 50 people/day (the local infrastructure supports up to 200 a day). By then, it was estimated that tourism in the archipelago generated R$2,5 million (another source reports R$4 million). Besides, the number of transgressions registered by ICMBio inside the area dropped from 2017's 98 to 4 in 2019.

Also in December 2019, new activities were authorized, such as night diving and overnight stays. In May 2020, ICMBio established a set of rules and prohibitions to be followed by touristic companies and visitors alike.

In November 2021, Educa Brasil Institute asked for the suspension of a then-imminent shooting exercise by the Brazilian Navy. In August 2022, a new practice session was scheduled and then cancelled following a request from ICMBio, which claimed that the Navy was only authorized to practice between November–April, and only within 1 km from Sapata Island.

== Bibliography ==
- Plano de Manejo da Estação Ecológica Tupinambás e Refúgio de Vida Silvestre do Arquipélago de Alcatrazes (PDF) (Report). Brasília: Instituto Chico Mendes de Conservação da Biodiversidade. March 2017.
