= Bisognin =

Bisognin is an Italian surname. Notable people with the name include:

- Marzia Bisognin (born 1992), Italian-British former internet personality
- Vitoria Bisognin (born 1992), Brazilian model and beauty queen
