= Luciane Escouto =

Brazilian volleyball player and model

Personal information
- Full name: Luciane Freire Escouto
- Born: 21 June 1987 (age 39) São Leopoldo, Brazil
- Height: 1.85 m (6 ft 1 in)
- Weight: 73 kg (161 lb)

Volleyball information
- Current club: (Brazil) Unilever

National team
- Years: Team
- Brazil

Luciane Freire Escouto (born 21 June 1987) is a is a former indoor volleyball player who played as a middle blocker for the Brazilian club Fluminense, during the 2012 regional championships in Rio. Before, having also played in the teams of Osasco, Pinheiros, Banespa, Macae and Brusque and Mackenzie Sports Club in Minas Gerais.

In 2011, at the insistence of her mother, she participated in the contest The Most Beautiful Gaucha and, despite the insecurity confesses, won against five thousand competitors, qualifying her to compete as Miss Rio Grande do Sul in contest Miss World Brazil 2013, where she made it to the finals and finished in 6th place.

== Biography ==
In an interview with WCB News, Luciane said she had 178 cm height at 11 years of age and her physical education teacher appointed her to a team of volleyball São Leopoldo. Soon, she was already in the selection and gaucho, with only 14 years old, was playing in the team's base Osasco, in São Paulo. She began playing with the team for the Superliga Banespa until 2012 and remained on professional teams category.

At the insistence of her mother, Veronica, she took part in the competition The Most Beautiful Gaucha. Though she had early on will be model, she feared no chance because of the molded body for the sport. In her words: "I thought I had potential. Model has to be supermagra and I, with chattering and cushion, thought would have no chance. " But Luciane and defeated five thousand candidates have applied automatically to represent her home state in the competition Miss Brazil World.

Still in her words:

I used to play model, how many girls when they are children. I dreamed of the glamor of parades, travel, the clothes we wear. As I started training since age 11, I devoted all my time to volleyball and studies. With that, I never imagined that it would participate in a beauty contest of truth.

— Luciane Escouto

In November 2012, Luciane announced it has been contracted by the team of Unilever, whose coach was Bernardinho, and that would dispute the Superliga. It reaffirmed its commitment to the Miss World Brazil and said that while it would be a pleasure to play in a top team with a great coach and players enshrined alongside, which could be your passport to selection.

The success off the court rendered Luciane many opportunities as a model and led to her being invited to participate in television programs such as Jô Soares and the Danilo Gentili. Luciane has 185 cm high, 100 cm hips, 68 cm waist, bust 92 cm and weighs 73 kg. Among the contracts that model obtained, there is the commercial for CR Diementz, which is a company specializing in selling eletromóveis, and the contract with the store Les Chemises. In addition, she participates in charitable events such as the 12th and Race Walk GRAACC (Support Group for Adolescents and Children with Cancer), on May 6, 2012.

== Miss World Brazil ==
On April 1, Luciane began her participation in the contest Miss World Brazil held in Mangalore, in Rio de Janeiro. She strove to improve her measures to suit contest, but it meant to slow the pace of training and cost her her position in Unilever, and stay out of the Superliga final. The contest, in its preliminary stage, involving other evidence beyond the catwalk and the question. There was evidence of fashion, in which the candidate rode her own look, and sports, in which the candidates practiced a mode currently set. Before, each could submit a video with a sample of specific talent. All evidence points counted for the definition of the sixteen finalists among the 38 participants from all over Brazil.
