= Julia Gama =

Beauty pageant titleholder

- Born: Julia Marie Weissheimer Werlang Gama; May 18, 1993 (age 33); Porto Alegre, Rio Grande do Sul, Brazil
- Height: 1.77 m (5 ft 9 1/2 in)
- Beauty pageant titleholder
- Title: Miss Brazil World 2014; Miss Brazil 2020
- Hair color: Black
- Major competitions: Miss Brazil World 2014; (Winner); Miss World 2014; (Top 11); Miss Universe 2020; (1st Runner-Up)

Julia Weissheimer Werlang Gama (born 18 May 1993) is a Brazilian model and beauty pageant titleholder who was appointed Miss Brasil 2020. She represented Brazil at the Miss Universe 2020 pageant, finishing as the 1st Runner-Up.

== Pageantry ==
=== Miss World Brazil 2014 ===
Gama represented her native country Brazil at Miss World 2014. The final show was held on 14 December 2014, in London, England. Having been one of the early favourites in the competition, Julia placed among the Top 11 semi-finalists. The eventual winner was Rolene Strauss from South Africa, who became the third woman from South Africa to win the title.

=== Miss Brazil 2020 ===
Gama was appointed as Miss Brazil Universe 2020 on August 20 of the same year. As Miss Brazil 2020 was officially canceled due to the COVID-19 pandemic, combined with administrative issues arising from the change in the franchise's owners, Gama was internally chosen to represent the country at Miss Universe 2020.

=== Miss Universe 2020 ===
As Miss Universe Brazil 2020, Gama represented Brazil at the Miss Universe 2020. held on May 16, 2021 at Seminole Hard Rock Hotel & Casino in Hollywood, Florida, United States. Gama finished in second place behind Mexico's Andrea Meza. This is Brazil's highest non-winning placement since 2007, when Natália Guimarães also finished as 1st Runner-Up.

== Filmography ==
Film
Year	Title	Role	Notes
2017	Delírius Insurgentes	Miss Vi	
2018	Invisible Tattoo	Xi Xiang Hong	

Television
Year	Title	Role	Notes
2022; 2025	La casa de los famosos	Housemate	13th place (season 2) 17th place (season 5)
2022–2023	Amores que engañan	Valeria Ingrid	Episode: "La felicidad no tiene precio" Episode: "El preferido de mamá"
2023	Los 50	Contestant	7th place
2024	El Señor de los Cielos	La Melosa	Guest star (season 9)
2024	La isla: desafío extremo	Contestant	Quit due to injury

Awards and achievements
Preceded by (Puerto Rico) Madison Anderson	Miss Universe 1st Runner-Up; 2020	Succeeded by (Paraguay) Nadia Ferreira
Preceded by (Minas Gerais) Júlia Horta	Miss Brasil/Miss Universo Brasil; 2020	Succeeded by (Ceará) Teresa Santos
Preceded by (Rio Grande do Sul) Sancler Frantz	Miss Mundo Brasil; 2014	Succeeded by (São Paulo (state)) Catharina Choi
Preceded by Luciane Escouto	Miss Rio Grande do Sul Mundo; 2014	Succeeded by Laís Berte
