= Sancler Frantz =

Brazilian model and beauty pageant titleholder

- Born: April 9, 1991 (age 35); Arroio do Tigre, Rio Grande do Sul, Brazil
- Occupation: Model
- Title: Miss Brazil World 2013; Miss Supranational Brazil 2023
- Modeling information
- Height: 1.75 m (5 ft 9 in)
- Hair color: Blonde
- Eye color: Brown

Sancler Frantz Konzen (born April 9, 1991) is a Brazilian model. A beauty pageant titleholder, she won Miss Brazil World 2013 and represented Brazil at Miss World 2013 where she reached the top six. In 2023, she was appointed to represent Brazil at Miss Supranational 2023 where she was second runner-up.

== Biography ==
Frantz was born in Arroio do Tigre, Rio Grande do Sul. Early in her life, she was taken to Rio de Janeiro by the agent Sergio Mattos to participate in Fashion São Luís, Maranhão, and Fashion Days in Minas Gerais. There, she modeled for brands including Colcci Fashion and Space; she also modeled designer jewelry for Priscilla Szafir.

Frantz additionally entered beauty pageants such as Princess Girl Summer 2009, Fall of Miss Rio Grande do Sul 2009, Miss Arroyo del Tigre 2010, Miss Rio Grande do Sul 2010 (step local), Miss Rio Grande do Sul 2010, the EC Musa Avenue 2010, Queen of Industry and Commerce of Rio Grande do Sul 2010, Princess Queen of Industry and Commerce of Rio Grande do Sul, Musa Gauchão 2010, Girl Jacuí Regional, Musa Sun RS, Musa Regional Clubs, and Queen City of Arroio do Tigre.

In 2011, Frantz represented Brazil at Miss Atlantic International in Punta del Este, Uruguay; the event's goal was to promote the exchange of cultures and tourism in Latin America. At the first event of the competition, Miss Atlantic Brazil, Frantz was awarded with a sash marking Etre Belle International Ambassador 2011 sponsored by a German company that funded the event. Additionally, she led the popular vote via internet, thus winning the title of Miss Atlantic International Internet.

Frantz was a journalism student from the Universidade de Santa Cruz do Sul. She was the host of the Journal of Pampa, Pampa TV News of Rio Grande do Sul, and also the Pampa Noon. She also participated in the variety show Studio Pampa, an arrangement brokered by a model management agency in São Paulo.

=== Top Model - The Reality ===
In 2012, Frantz appeared in the reality show Top Model - the Reality and achieved third place. The chosen candidate from Porto Alegre, Frantz competed against 23 other candidates selected in six capitals and went through a competition that included learning how to apply makeup, parading professionally, participating in a tree climbing circuit, biking, and kayaking. Frantz won the popular vote with 80% of votes. She was also invited to be a reporter for the Evening Program at TV Record.

=== Miss Brazil World ===
In April 2013, Frantz competed at Miss Brazil World 2013 as Miss World Lobos Island. At the event, representatives of 27 states and several Brazilian islands totaled 37 candidates, all of whom arrived in Rio de Janeiro on March 31 and went to the Portobello Resort & Safari where they participated in competition. The elected Miss World Brazil 2013 would receive the crown of Mariana Notarangelo, Miss Brazil World 2012, and represent the country at Miss World 2013 in Jakarta, Indonesia on September 28, with more than 120 participating countries.

In the contest, Frantz developed a social project where she collected thousands of pieces of clothing for donation in her hometown of Arroio do Tigre of Rio Grande do Sul. As a result, she was second in Best Social Project among all candidates.

Before the final, Frantz also earned Best Smile. Furthermore, won the event called Parade of Top Model, was voted third in the Best Body contest, and won the title of Miss Islands. In the end, Frantz was crowned the winner of the contest and won the right to represent Brazil in the Miss World contest. She stated in a UOL interview: "I'm not believing yet. It's a big dream I have. I gave the best of me. My differential is my determination to do my best and give my best in every race."

=== Miss World 2013 ===
Frantz represented Brazil at Miss World 2013 on September 28, 2013, held at the Bali Nusa Dua Convention Center in Bali, Indonesia. She reached the top six and was named the continental queen of beauty for the Americas.

=== Miss Supranational 2023 ===
Frantz was appointed to represent Brazil at the Miss Supranational 2023 on July 14, 2023 in Malopolska, Poland where she was second runner-up and was named the Supra Influencer Award.

Awards and achievements
Preceded by (Vietnam) Nguyễn Huỳnh Kim Duyên	Miss Supranational 2nd Runner-Up; 2023	Succeeded by (Czech Republic) Justýna Zedníková
Preceded by Giovanna Reis, Paraná	Miss Brasil Supranational; 2023	Succeeded by Isadora Murta, Minas Gerais
Preceded by Mariana Notarângelo, Rio de Janeiro	Miss Mundo Brasil; 2013	Succeeded by Julia Gama, Rio Grande do Sul
Preceded by Andressa Mello	Miss Ilha dos Lobos; 2014	Succeeded by Vitoria Bisognin
