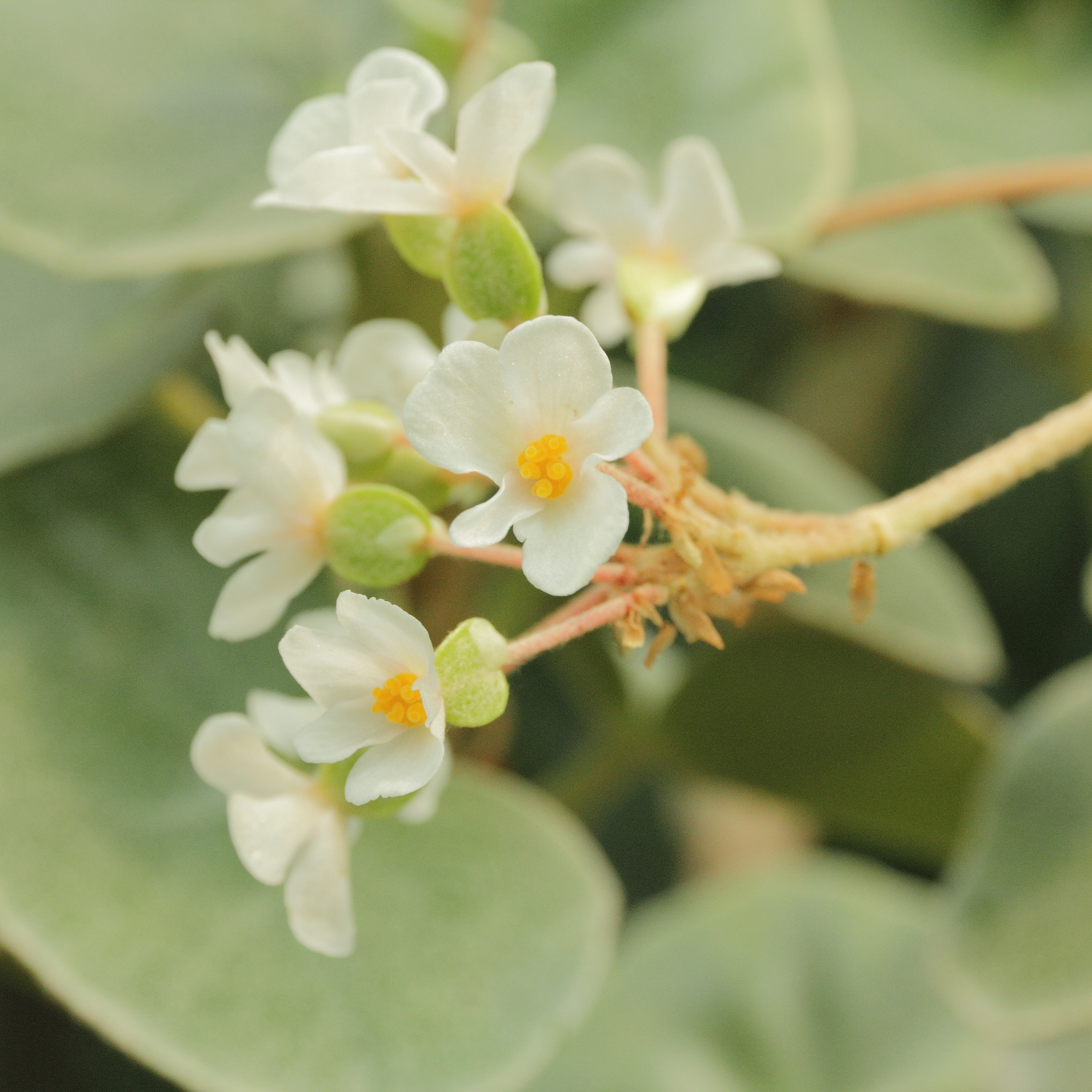
- Close-up of flowers
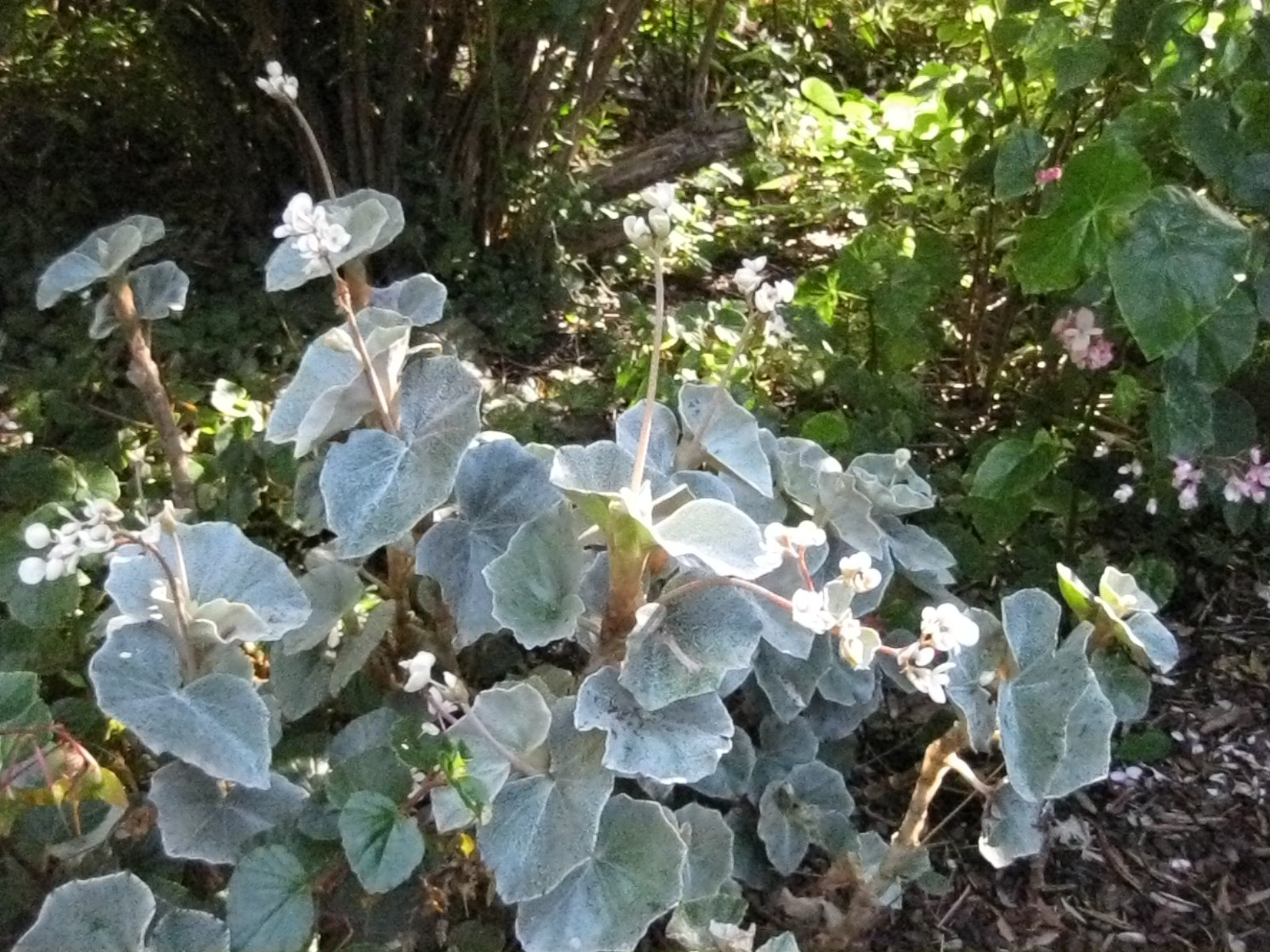
- Habit

Scientific classification
- Kingdom: Plantae
- Clade: Tracheophytes
- Clade: Angiosperms
- Clade: Eudicots
- Clade: Rosids
- Order: Cucurbitales
- Family: Begoniaceae
- Genus: Begonia
- Species: B. venosa

Binomial name
- Begonia venosa Skan ex Hook.f.

= Begonia venosa =

Species of flowering plant

Begonia venosa, the veined begonia, is a species of flowering plant in the family Begoniaceae, native to eastern Brazil. Kept as a houseplant for its striking foliage, it can handle more sunlight than the average begonia, and prefers a well-drained soil.

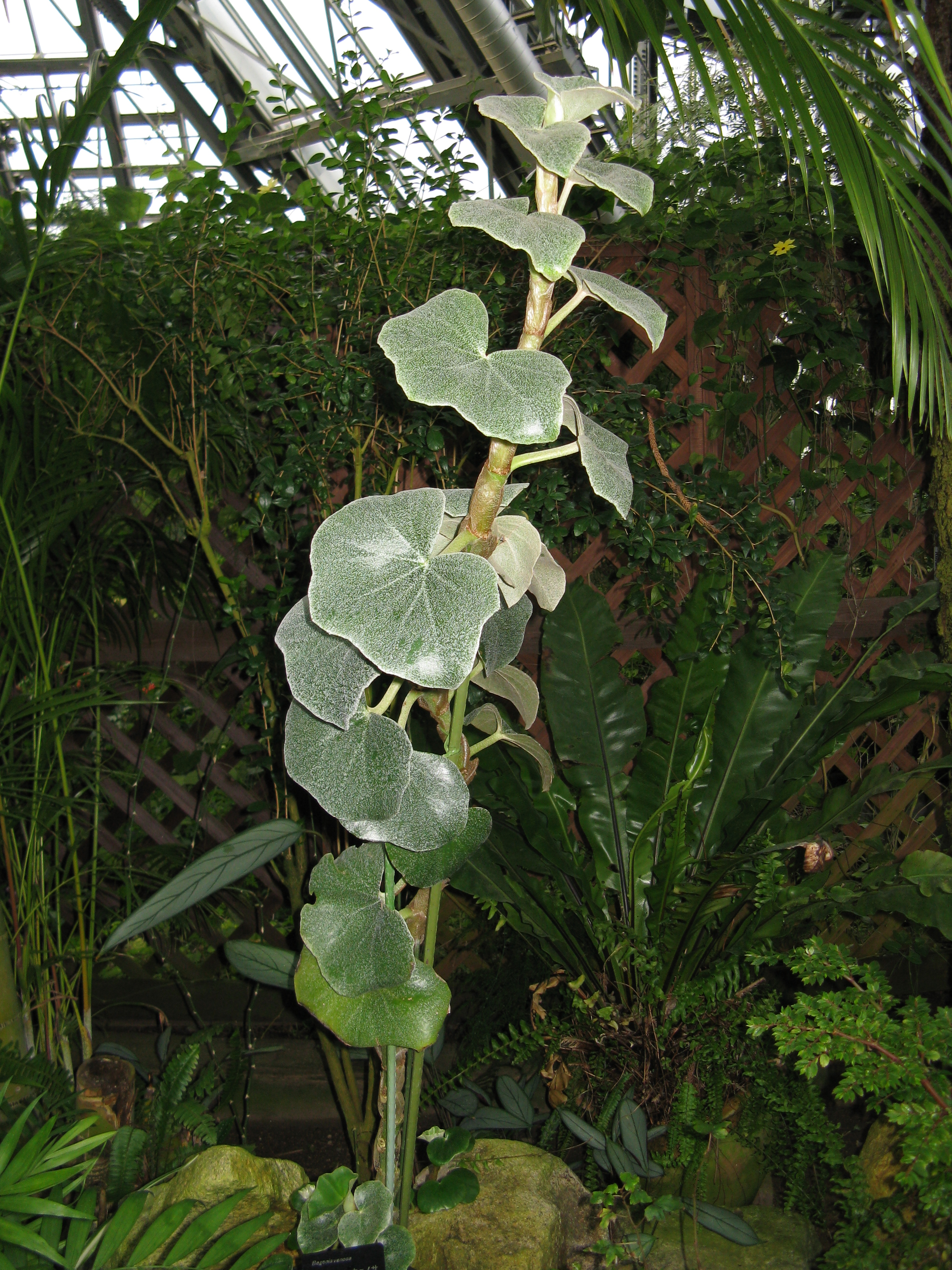
A leggy specimen
