= Ilha Anchieta State Park =

Island state park in São Paulo, Brazil

- Parque Estadual da Ilha Anchieta
- IUCN category II (national park)
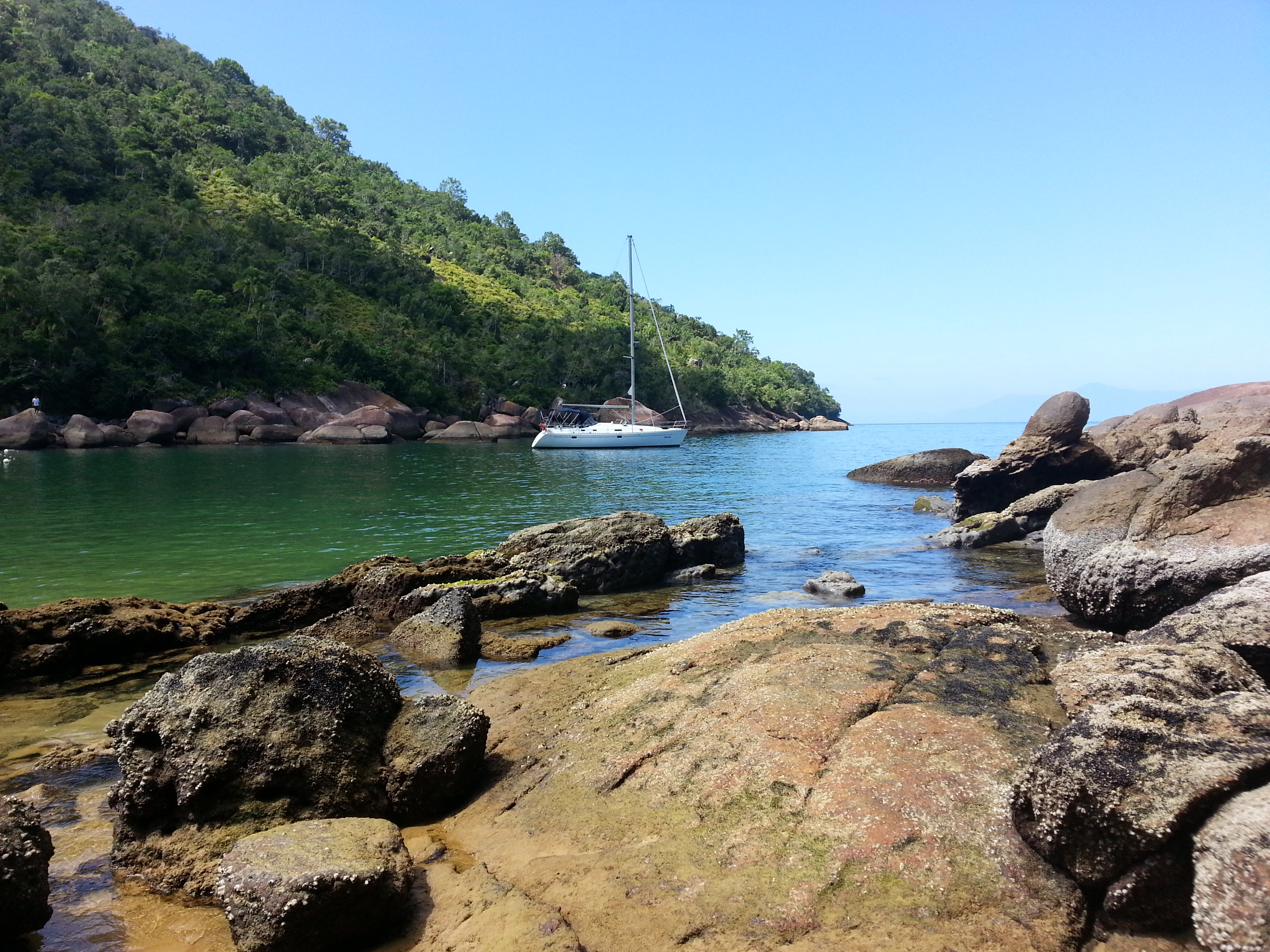
- Ilha Anchieta, south beach

- Location within Brazil
- Nearest city: Ubatuba, São Paulo
- Coordinates: 23.545°S 45.062°W
- Area: 828 hectares (2,050 acres).
- Designation: State park
- Created: 29 March 1977

The Ilha Anchieta State Park (Portuguese: Parque Estadual da Ilha Anchieta) is a state park in the state of São Paulo, Brazil.

== Location ==
The Ilha Anchieta State Park covers the Ilha Anchieta, an offshore island in the Atlantic Ocean in the municipality of Ubatuba, São Paulo. It is south of the town of Ubatuba, east of the city of São Paulo. It has an area of 828 hectares (2,050 acres). The park is part of the Bocaina Mosaic of conservation units.

== Nature ==
The park is home to many species of terrestrial and oceanic species including endangered species, and conservational approaches have been made. Some of these are quatis, Atlantic goliath grouper, southern right whale, Bryde's whale, and dolphins.

== History ==
When Europeans arrived in the 16th century the island was occupied by the Tupinambá people. Until 1934 it was known as the Ilha do Porcos (Pig Island). The island contains more than 2,000 square metres (22,000 sq ft) of preserved historical buildings, as well as ruins of the prison, barracks and civil village of the correctional colony of Porto das Palmas. The island was used as a prison for common criminals until 1955, when there was a great prisoner rebellion.

The Ilha Anchieta State Park was created by the governor of São Paulo, Paulo Egydio Martins, by decree 9.629 of 29 March 1977. This reversed a prior decree that gave administration of the island to the department of urbanization and improvement of resorts. The purpose was to ensure full protection of natural resources, and to install a laboratory for scientific purposes to encourage mariculture.

== Sources ==
- Mosaico de Unidades de Conservação da Bocaina - SP e RJ (PDF) (in Portuguese), RBMA, archived from the original (PDF) on 2016-10-11
- PES da Ilha Anchieta (in Portuguese), ISA: Instituto Socioambiental
