= Porto Belo =

- Municipality
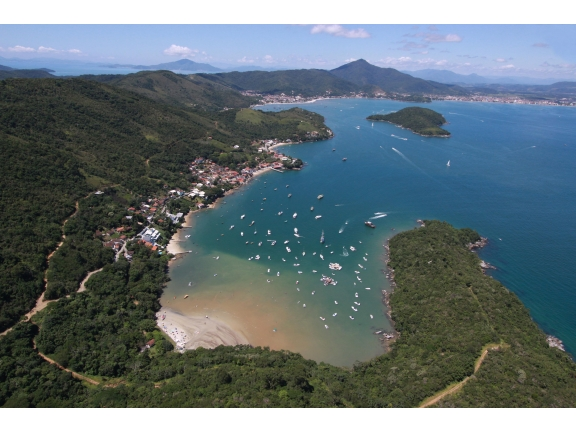
- Vista Leste Caixa D'Aço - Porto Belo

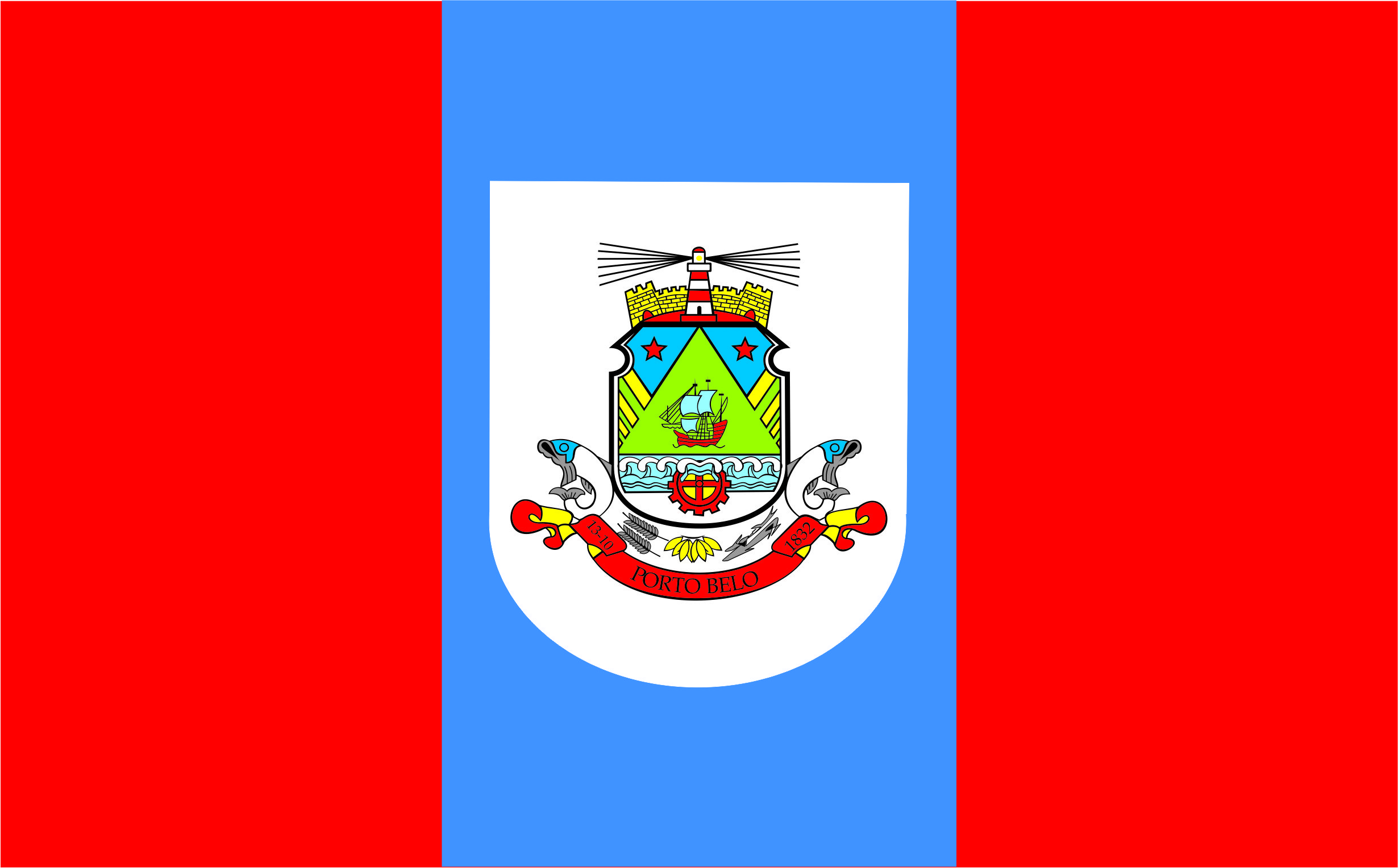
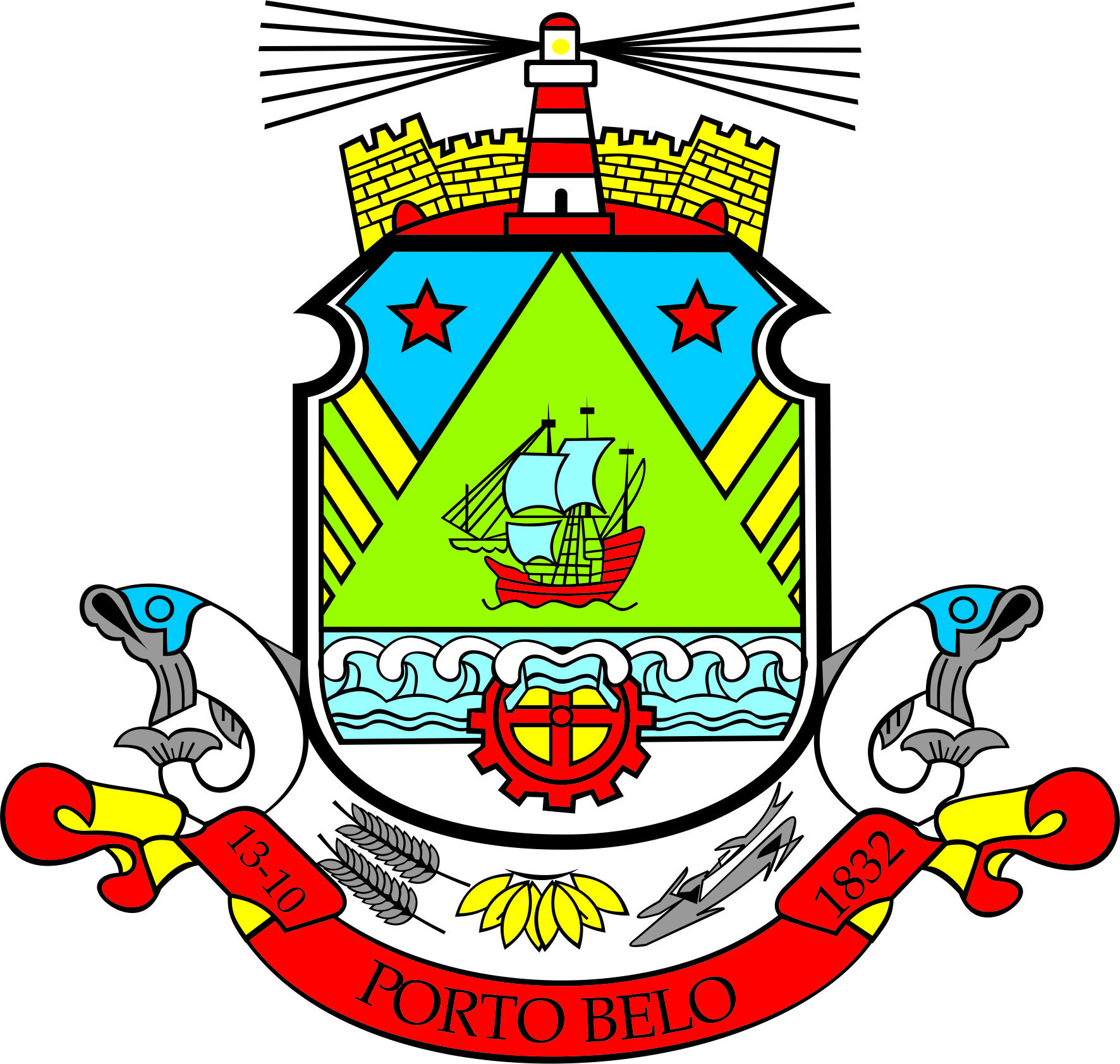
- Flag Coat of arms

- Location in the State of Santa Catarina

- Coordinates: 27°09′28″S 48°33′10″W
- Country: Brazil
- Region: South
- State: Santa Catarina
- Mesoregion: Vale do Itajai

Government
  - Mayor: Joel Orlando Lucinda

Area
  - Total: 36.17 sq mi (93.67 km^{2})

Population (2025)
  - Total: 31,557
  - Density: 872.6/sq mi (336.9/km^{2})
- Time zone: UTC−3 (BRT)
- Website: www.portobelo.sc.gov.br

Porto Belo is a municipality in the state of Santa Catarina in the South region of Brazil.

== Geography and climate ==
Porto Belo is located in the eastern part of the state of Santa Catarina. The municipality is situated on a sheltered bay with beaches and the offshore island Ilha de Porto Belo.

The climate is subtropical, with mild temperatures and relatively evenly distributed rainfall throughout the year. Average temperatures typically range between 14 and 28 °C.

== History ==
In the mid-18th century, the Portuguese government launched a project to colonize the coast of Santa Catarina and settled migrants from the Azores in the region. Its location on a natural bay facilitated its development as a port and fishing center. However, the establishment of the settlement proceeded rather slowly due to the region’s remoteness and Spanish attacks.

In 1818, the settlement of Enseada das Garoupas was elevated to the status of the colony of Nova Ericeira. The aim was to establish fishing in the region. However, the name Nova Ericeira did not catch on, and the place continued to be called Enseada das Garoupas until it was renamed Vila de São Bom Jesus dos Aflitos de Porto Belo on December 18, 1824 after the natural beauty of the area. On October 13, 1832, the town was elevated to the status of a municipality.

For a long time, the town relied primarily on trade and fishing. In the 20th century, tourism gained increasing importance and developed into a major economic factor.

On March 30, 1992, Bombinhas east of Porto Belo was separated from the municipality of Porto Belo and elevated to the status of an independent municipality.

== Demographics ==
The population was estimated by IBGE at approximately 32,000 in 2025. The population is concentrated primarily in the coastal town center. In 2022, around three-quarters of the residents were White Brazilians.

Census	Population
1991	6,955
2000	10,704
2010	16,083
2022	27,688

== Economy ==
The town is a popular tourist destination with beaches and maritime amenities, which is why its economy is primarily based on tourism. The town is a popular port of call for cruise ships, which dock here regularly. The calm waters attract boats, divers and surfers.

== Culture ==
The Travessia de Porto Belo town festival is celebrated on October 13 and is the most important event of the year.

== Pictures ==
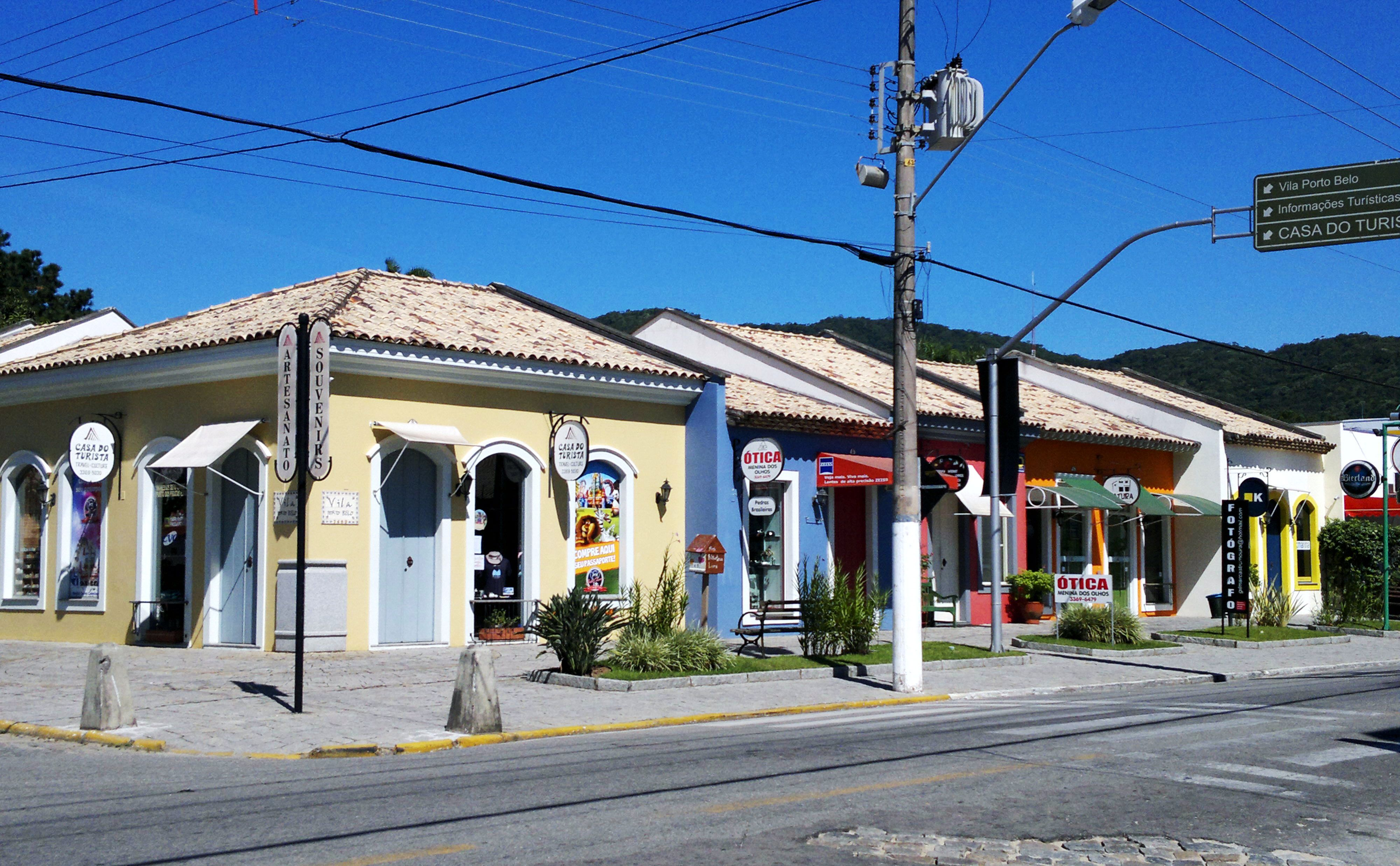
Street in Porto Belo

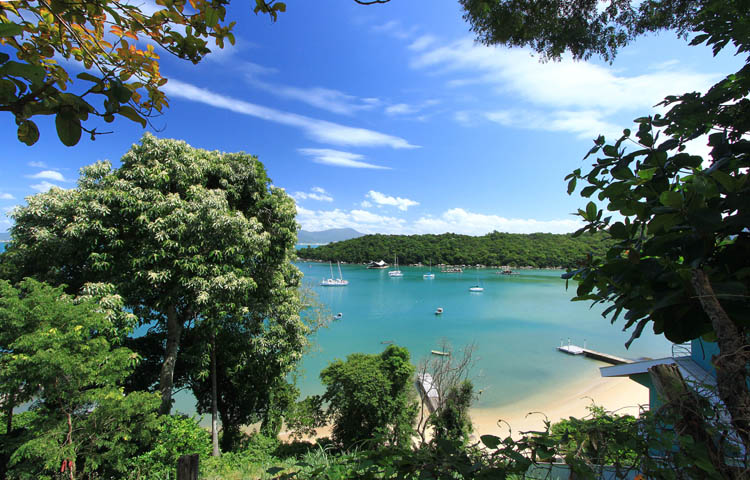
Caixa d'Aço Beach

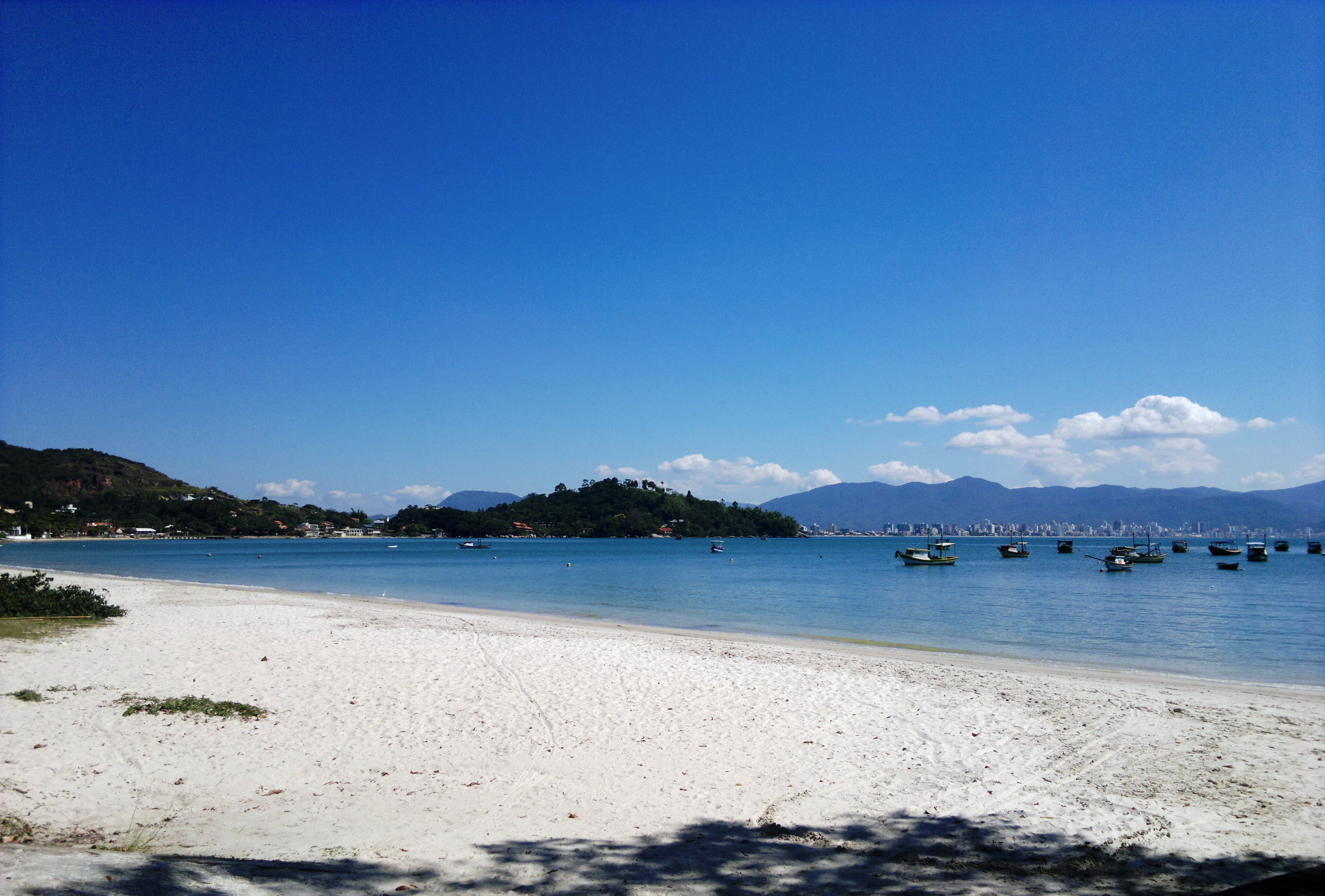
Beach

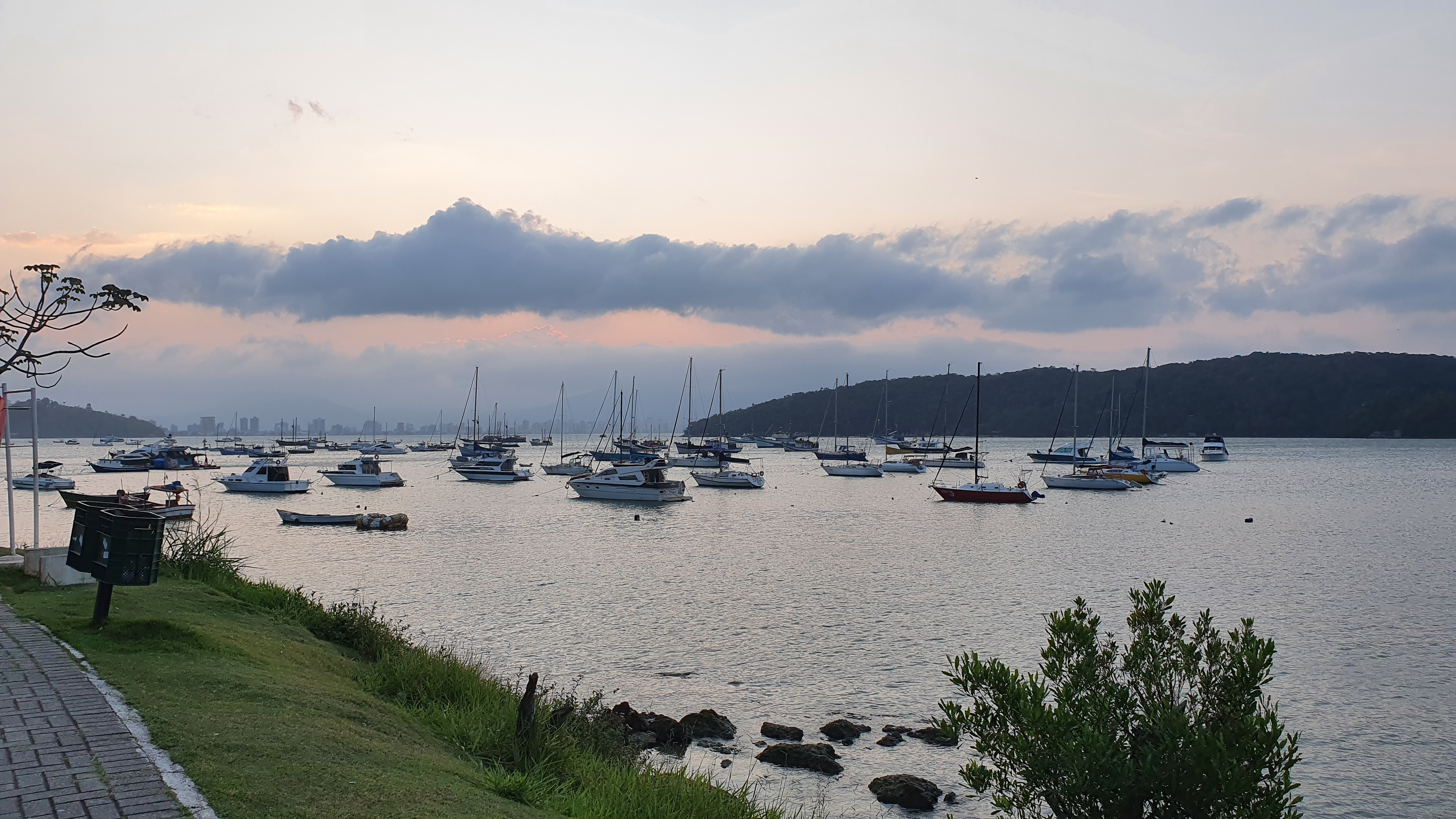
Boats in Porto Belo

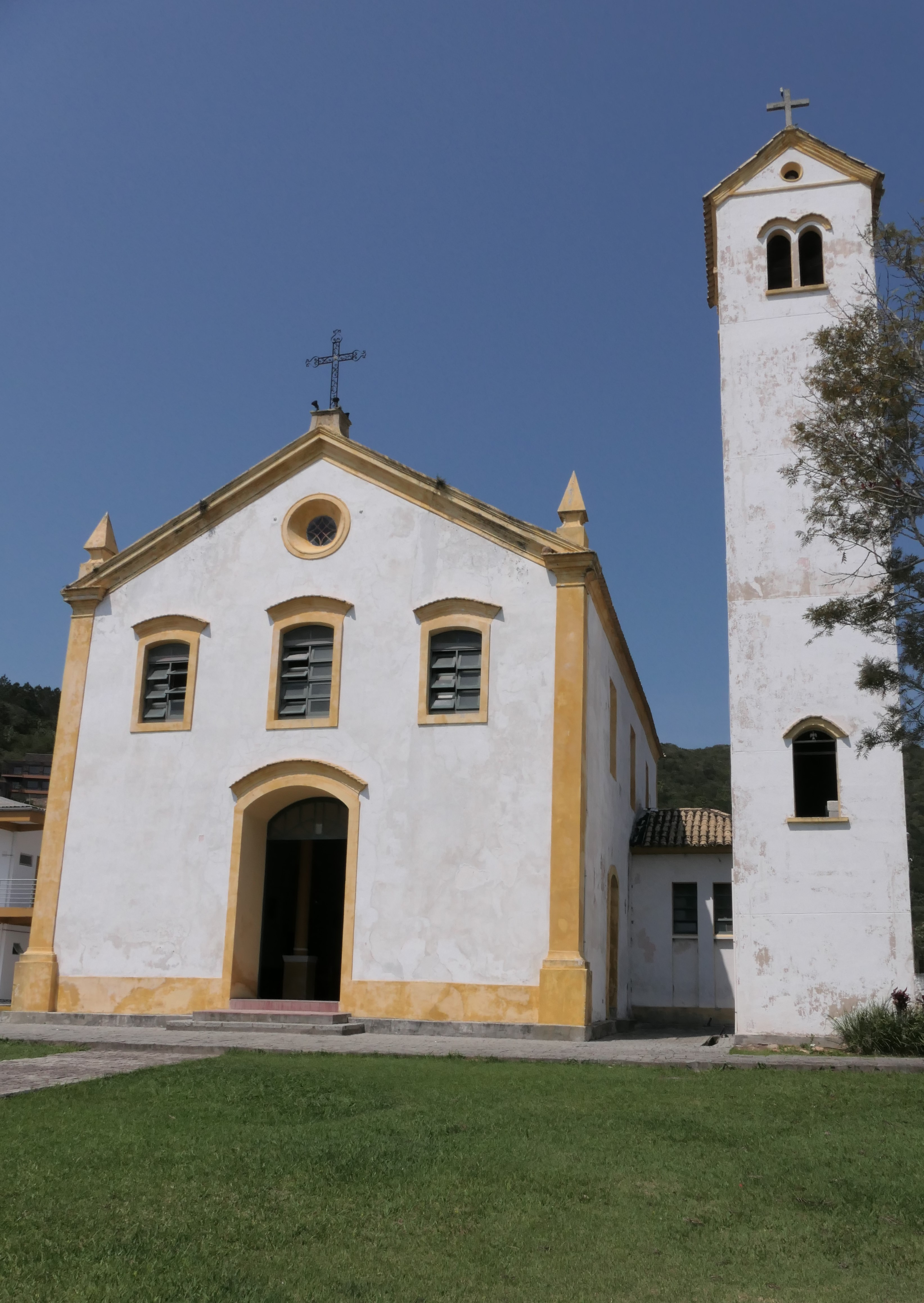
Senhor Bom Jesus Parish Church

== See also ==
- List of municipalities in Santa Catarina
