= Ilha dos Lobos =

Island and wildlife refuge in Rio Grande do Sul, Brazil

- Refúgio de Vida Silvestre da Ilha dos Lobos
- IUCN category III (natural monument or feature)
- Ilha dos Lobos with Torres on the background

- Location within Brazil
- Nearest city: Torres, Rio Grande do Sul
- Coordinates: 29.347°S 49.704°W
- Area: 1.7 hectares (4.2 acres)
- Designation: Wildlife refuge
- Created: 4 July 1983
- Administrator: Instituto Chico Mendes de Conservação da Biodiversidade

Ilha dos Lobos is a small island and wildlife refuge on the Atlantic coast of Torres, Rio Grande do Sul, Brazil.

== Location ==
Ilha dos Lobos is about 2 kilometres (1.2 mi) offshore from the Praia Grande of the coastal city of Torres on the northern shore of the state of Rio Grande do Sul. It is named after the sea lions (grandes lobos marinhos) who use the island for breeding between July and November. The island's highest point is 2 metres (6 ft 7 in). It has caused many shipwrecks in storms, including the Hawaii (1965). The island is a resting point for seals migrating from Patagonia, and is a transit point for dolphins, whales, porpoises, sea turtles and birds.

== Conservation ==
The Ilha dos Lobos Ecological Reserve was created on 4 July 1983 by presidential decree with an area of 16,966 square metres (182,620 sq ft). This was revoked and the island was reclassified as a wildlife refuge on 4 July 2005, the Refúgio de vida silvestre Ilha dos Lobos. The reserve was created to protect and monitor marine species, for research and environmental education. Fishing or landing on the reserve is prohibited.

== Recreational use ==
The island has started to attract surfers, who come by boat. They have found it is a giant point break with proper conditions for Tow-in surfing. Much of the effort to establish Ilha dos Lobos as an international class tow-in surf spot is credited to Torres Local Surf hero Zeca Scheffer, who died in a car crash in Dec 2006. Surfing in this island is banned because of its conservation status by national laws. Although proper conditions are rare it is possible to dive around the island.

Surfer riding wave on the vicinity of the island

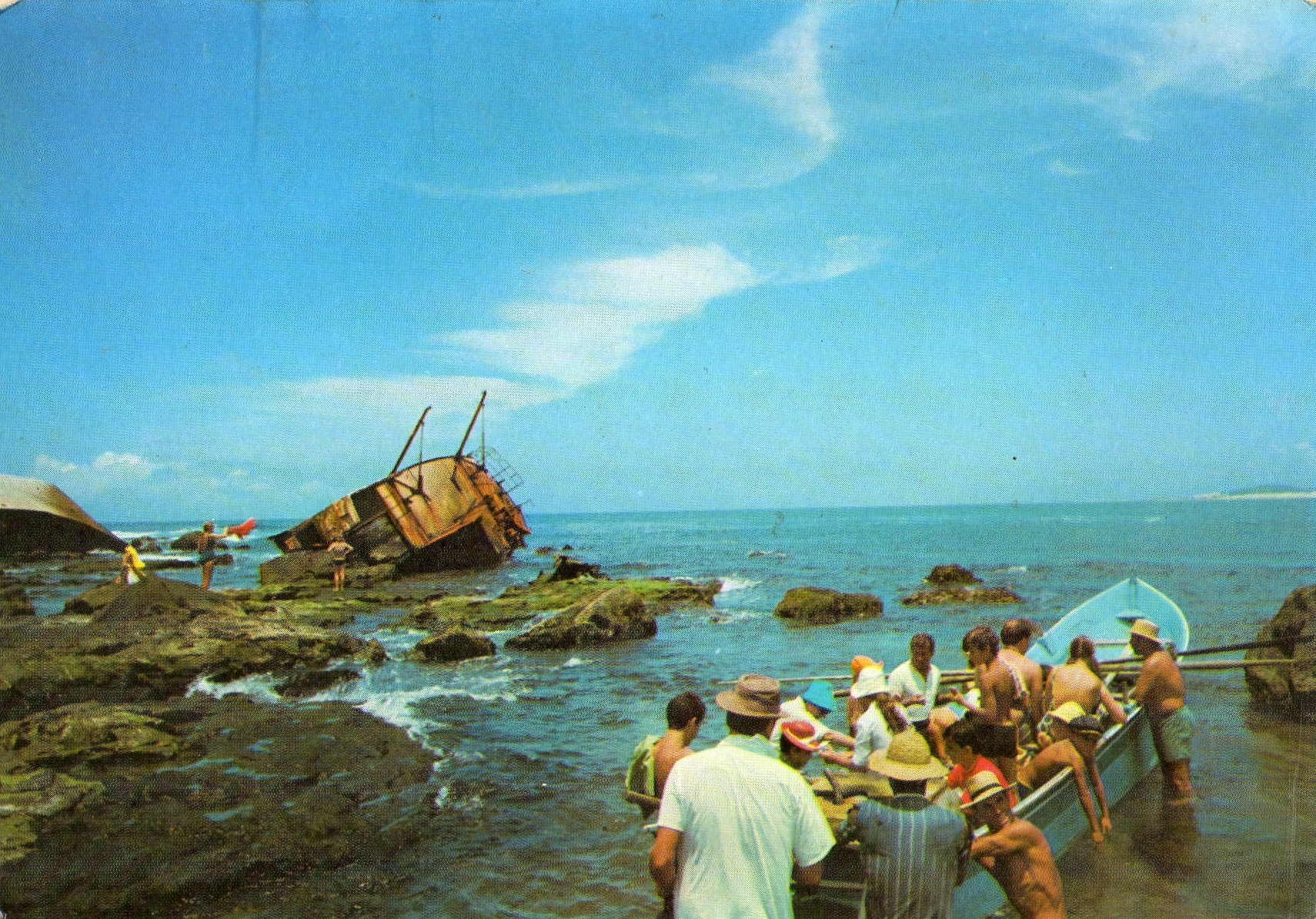
Visitors to the island June 2008

== Sources ==
- Reserva Ecológica da Ilha dos Lobos (in Portuguese), Via Rural, archived from the original on 2016-03-13
