= Vitoria Bisognin =

Brazilian model and beauty queen

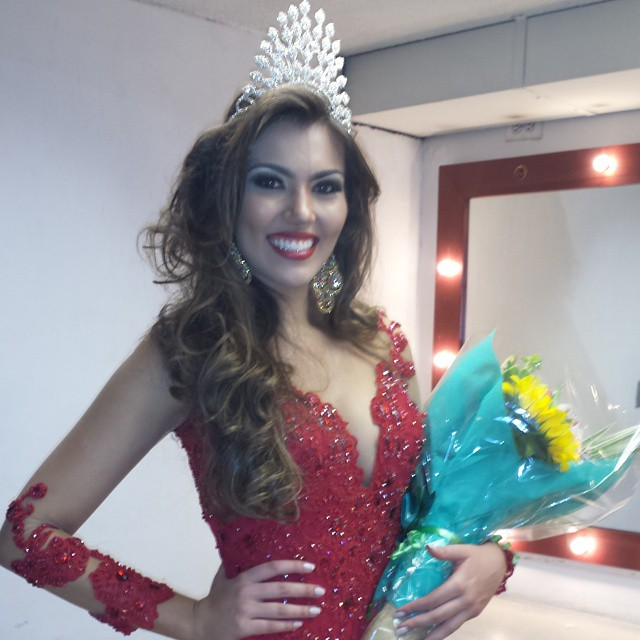
- Born: Vitoria Machado Bisognin; April 19, 1992 (age 34); Santa Maria, Brazil
- Occupation: Model
- Modeling information
- Hair color: black
- Eye color: black

Vitoria Machado Bisognin (born April 19, 1992, in Santa Maria, Rio Grande do Sul) is a Brazilian model and beauty queen.

== Career ==
On April 16, 2011, she was selected into the national phase of Miss Italia Nel Mondo. In July, she competed as Miss Italy Brazil Portugal (a contest that values the Italian immigration in other countries), having been among the finalists. Vitoria is studying psychology and has worked with Ana Hickmann, besides being one of the best known models of Rio Grande do Sul.

Vitoria also was Miss Santa Maria between December 2010 and December 2011. Santa Maria is the city of several winners of Miss Brazil and is sometimes called Brazilian Venezuela because their representatives are very well prepared for the national contest. She took third place in Miss Rio Grande do Sul in December 2011. In 2012, Vitoria was elected Vice-Miss at Miss America RS. In 2013, she was elected Miss Lobos Island to compete in Miss World 2014, the most important beauty contest in the world.

Year	Contest
2009	Broto Cristal das Águas
2009	Miss Beleza Rio Grande do Sul 2010
2010	Miss Itália Nel Mondo, etapa nacional
2010	Miss Santa Maria
2011	Miss Brasil Itália Portugal
2013	Miss Ilha dos Lobos
