= Arquipélago =

Neighborhood in Porto Alegre, Brazil

Coordinates: 29°59′32″S 51°13′31″W

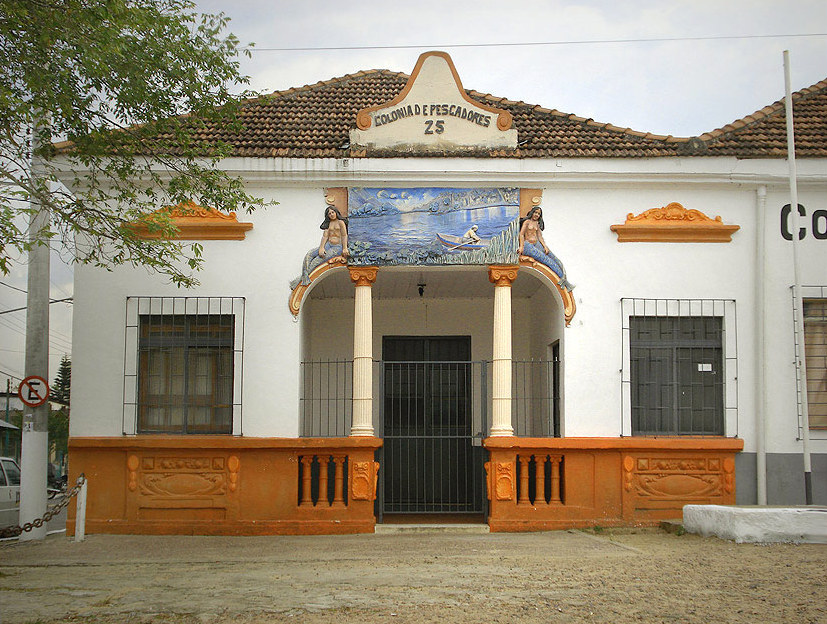
Fishermen colony

Arquipélago (meaning Archipelago in Portuguese) is a neighbourhood in the city of Porto Alegre, the state capital of Rio Grande do Sul, Brazil. It was created by Law 2022 on December 7, 1959. The neighbourhood comprises 16 islands that are also part of Jacuí Delta State Park.
