= Greater Goiânia =

Greater Goiânia Grande Goiânia
- Location in the state of Goiás
- Interactive map of Greater Goiânia
- Coordinates: 16°40′00″S 49°15′00″W
- Country: Brazil
- Major Cities: Goiânia; Aparecida de Goiânia; Trindade; Senador Canedo; Goianira; Bela Vista de Goiás

Area
  - Metro: 5,787 km^{2} (2,234 sq mi)

Population (2009)
  - Metro: 2,102,097
  - Metro density: 346.96/km^{2} (898.6/sq mi)
- GDP: 2005 estimate
- Nominal: R$ 180,405,915,000.00
- Per capita: R$ 9,832.00

The Goiânia metropolitan area (Portuguese: Região Metropolitana de Goiânia), popularly known as Greater Goiânia (Portuguese: Grande Goiânia), is a conurbation of cities around Goiânia, capital of the Brazilian state of Goiás.

== History ==
The metropolitan area was established on December 30, 1999 by the Complementary State Law number 27, and is the largest of Central-Western Brazil. It was the first metropolitan area of that region, since the Cuiabá metropolitan area was only established almost ten years later, on May 28, 2009.

It is formed by the following municipalities:

- Abadia de Goiás
- Aparecida de Goiânia
- Aragoiânia
- Bela Vista de Goiás
- Goiânia
- Goianápolis
- Goianira
- Guapó
- Hidrolândia
- Nerópolis
- Santo Antônio de Goiás
- Senador Canedo
- Trindade

== Demography ==
Encompassing thirteen municipalities, Greater Goiânia has an area of 5,787 km2 (or 2,234 square miles). It is by far the most expressive region of the state of Goiás, containing around 35% of its total population, a third of its voters, about 80% of its college students, and 36,5% of its GDP.

According to the Brazilian Institute of Geography and Statistics, over two million people live on this metropolitan area, making it the 11th most populous in Brazil and the 210th in the world.

=== Economic inequality ===
According to the 2008–2009 State of the World's Cities report by the United Nations Human Settlements Programme (UN-Habitat), Goiânia has the largest economic inequality index among the nineteen Latin American cities analyzed. Its Gini index is 65, while the goal for UN-Habitat is 40. If Goiânia was a country, it would be the second most unequal in the world, second only to Namibia.

Goiânia follows a state trend, since Goiás reached its highest economic inequality index for the past decade in 2005. Both the state and its capital, however, do not follow the national trend, once Brazil has reached an all-time low inequality index in the past five years. According to Cecília Martinez, director of UN-Habitat's regional office for Latin America and the Caribbean, this happens because "public policies prioritize the richest areas in the city". According to her, there is a lack of "orderly planning" and "clear policies" to foster the development of poorer areas.

For the 2010–2011 report, Goiânia remained as the most economically unequal city of Latin America, with a Gini index above 60. Among all cities in the world analyzed by the UN-Habitat, Goiânia is behind only Buffalo City, Johannesburg, and Ekurhuleni, all three of them located in South Africa.

=== Human development ===
According to 2000 data by the Brazilian Institute of Geography and Statistics, the Greater Goiânia has a Human Development Index of 0.812, making it the 14th metropolitan area of Brazil in human development. With the dissolution of six metropolitan areas in 2007, however, it rose to the 9th position. The HDI of Greater Goiãnia is a little bit higher than the Brazilian average of 0.800.

=== Religion ===
The Greater Goiânia area has the least Roman Catholic population in all the state of Goiás. Over 60% of its population consists of self-declared Catholics, while this rate varies from 65% to 85% in other areas of the state. On the other hand, Goiânia metropolitan area is the fastest growing region for Protestantism in the state. According to the report Economy of Religions by Fundação Getúlio Vargas, Goiânia is the Brazilian capital with the largest number of Protestants. Among Pentecostals and non-Pentecostals, over a quarter of the city's inhabitants are self-declared Protestants.
