= Microregion of Goiânia =

Coordinates: 16°40′S 49°15′W

Goiânia
- Microregion
- Location in Goias state
- Country: Brazil
- State: Goiás
- Mesoregion: Centro Goiano
- Municipalities: 17

Area
  - Total: 6,848.00 km^{2} (2,644.03 sq mi)

Population (2007)
  - Total: 2,032,305
  - Density: 296.774/km^{2} (768.640/sq mi)

The Goiânia Microregion is a region in central Goiás state, Brazil. It includes 17 municipalities with a population of 2,032,305 (2007) in a total area of 6,848.00 km^{2}.

The most important cities are Goiânia (1,244.645 inhabitants), Aparecida de Goiânia (475,303 inhabitants), and Trindade (97,491 inhabitants).

The smallest municipality in population is Santo Antônio de Goiás with 3,893 inhabitants.

The largest municipality in area is Bela Vista de Goiás with 1,280.9 km^{2}. The smallest is Terezópolis de Goiás with 107.3 km^{2}.

== Municipalities ==
The microregion consists of the following municipalities:

- Abadia de Goiás
- Aparecida de Goiânia
- Aragoiânia
- Bela Vista de Goiás
- Bonfinópolis
- Caldazinha
- Goianápolis
- Goiânia
- Goianira
- Guapó
- Hidrolândia
- Leopoldo de Bulhões
- Nerópolis
- Santo Antônio de Goiás
- Senador Canedo
- Terezópolis de Goiás
- Trindade

== See also ==
- List of municipalities in Goiás
- Microregions of Goiás
