= Aparecida de Goiânia =

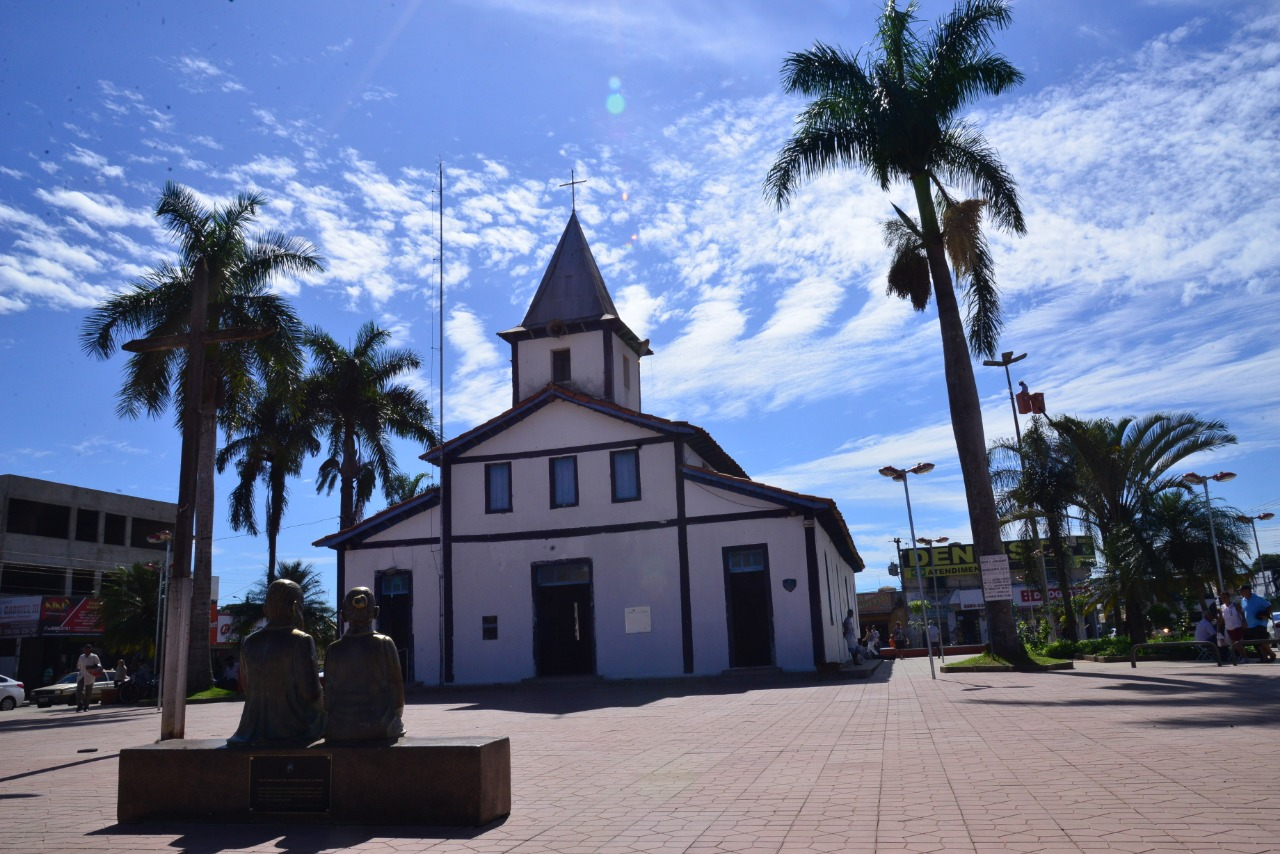
- Main square in Aparecida de Goiânia

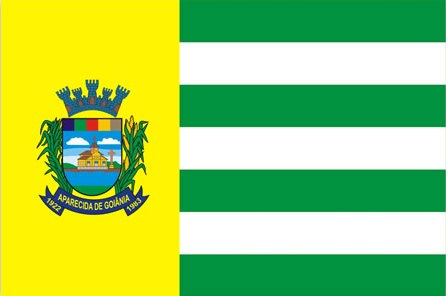
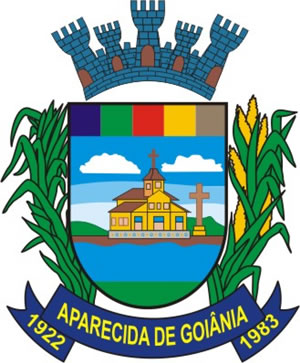
- Flag Coat of arms

- Location in Goiás

- Location within Brazil
- Coordinates: 16°49′22″S 49°13′32″W
- Country: Brazil
- Region: Central-West
- State: Goiás
- City Status: 1963

Area
  - Total: 290.1 km^{2} (112.0 sq mi)
- Elevation: 808 m (2,651 ft)

Population (2022)
  - Total: 527,796
  - Density: 1,819/km^{2} (4,712/sq mi)
- Demonym: Aparecidense
- Time zone: UTC−3 (BRT)
- Postal code: 76310-00
- Area code: (+55) 62

Aparecida de Goiânia (Brazilian Portuguese pronunciation: [apaɾeˈsidɐ dʒi ɡoˈjɐniɐ]) is a city and municipality in central Goiás, Brazil. It is the second largest city in the state (with a population of 590,146 inhabitants, according to the 2020 estimate) and the third largest industrial center, with a GDP of 11.980.984 billion reais in 2018 (just behind Goiânia and Anápolis).

== Geography ==
=== Location ===
Bordering on the southern limits of Goiânia, 21 kilometers from the center, Aparecida has experienced rapid growth as a suburb and an option for less expensive housing than in neighboring Goiânia.

Municipal boundaries are with:

- North: Goiânia
- South: Hidrolândia
- East: Bela Vista de Goiás and Senador Canedo
- West: Aragoiânia and Abadia de Goiás

The city is cut by the BR-153 (Goiânia-São Paulo) and several municipal highways and bathed by the Meia Ponte River.

=== Climate ===
The climate is tropical wet and dry or savanna climate (Aw) with an annual average of 21 °C and a rainfall index of 1,500 mm., with rains concentrated in the months of November to March.

== Demographics ==
- Population density: 1,647.7 inhabitants/km^{2} (2007)
- Population growth 2000-2007: 5.06.%
- Population change: the population, now over 400, 000, has been growing at a fast rate since 1980, when it was 42,000.

== Political Information ==
In January 2005 the mayor was José Macedo de Araújo. There were 224,835 eligible voters in December 2007 and the city council had 17 members. In October 2008 Maguito Vilela was elected mayor, who took office in January 2009.

== History ==
The history of Aparecida, like that of Goiânia, is recent. In 1922, devotees of Our Lady of Aparecida donated land so that their neighbors could build a church dedicated to the Virgin. In 1958 it was elevated to the rank of vila, as a district of Goiânia with the name Aparecida de Goiás. In 1958, the name was changed to Goialândia, which remained until 1963, when it emancipated itself and adopted the name Aparecida de Goiânia.

== Economy ==
Its proximity to the capital has attracted important industries like Mabel (cookies), Vepeza and others, concentrated in the four different industrial zones on the edge of BR-153. In recent years the number of companies has doubled. In 2007 there were 964 industries. The industrial centers in the city are Distrito Agroindustrial de Aparecida de Goiânia (Daiag), Distrito Industrial (Dimag), Pólo Empresarial Goiás and Cidade Empresarial.

In 2007, there were 13 financial institutions in the city.

Despite the heavy industrialization Aparecida still produces agricultural products. The cattle herd was 11,700 in 2003. Other agricultural products are rice, manioc, bananas, coconut, and sugarcane.

== Health (2007) and Education (2006) ==
- Hospitals: 08
- Hospital beds: 782
- Infant mortality rate: 1990 – 35.4; 2000 – 20.9
- Higher education: Faculdade Cidade de Aparecida de Goiânia – FACCIDADE; Faculdade Alfredo Nasser – UNIFAN; – Faculdade Nossa Senhora Aparecida – FANAP; – Universidade Estadual de Goiás – UEG; – Faculdade Mestra (Padrão); – Faculdade Sul da América – SULDAMÉRICA.
- Literacy rate: 1991 – 85.2%; 2000 – 92.1%
- HDI: 0.764
- State ranking: 49 (out of 242 municipalities)
- National ranking: 1,488 (out of 5,507 municipalities)

== Tourism ==
One of the festivals that most attracts tourists to this industrial city is the festival of its patroness, Nossa Senhora Aparecida.

== See also ==
- List of municipalities in Goiás
