= Juninho (footballer, born 5 April 1985) =

Brazilian footballer

Personal information
- Full name: Júnior César Moreira da Cunha
- Date of birth: 5 April 1985 (age 41)
- Place of birth: Goianápolis, Brazil
- Height: 1.67 m (5 ft 6 in)
- Positions: Striker; winger

Senior career*
Years	Team	Apps	(Gls)
2007–2008	Anápolis	0	(0)
2007	→ Vila Nova (loan)	?	(?)
2008–2015	Atlético Goianiense	148	(36)
2012	→ Atlético Mineiro (loan)	3	(0)
2016	Fortaleza	15	(1)
2017	Náutico	0	(0)
2017	Paysandu	10	(1)
2017–2018	Linense	0	(0)
2018	Goiânia	0	(0)
2019–?	Taubaté	0	(0)
- * Club domestic league appearances and goals as of 12:08, 23 April 2019 (UTC)

Júnior César Moreira da Cunha (born 5 April 1985), also known as Juninho, is a Brazilian former professional footballer who played as a forward.

== Career ==
Born in Goianápolis, Juninho played for Vila Nova on loan from Anápolis in 2007. In 2008, he joined Atlético Goianiense, on a five-year contract.

== Career statistics ==
(Correct as of 16 October 2010)

Club	Season	State League		Brazilian Série A		Copa do Brasil		Copa Libertadores		Copa Sudamericana		Total	
Club	Season	Apps	Goals	Apps	Goals	Apps	Goals	Apps	Goals	Apps	Goals	Apps	Goals
Atlético Goianiense	2010	-	-	29	9	-	-	-	-	-	-	29	9
Total		-	-	29	9	-	-	-	-	-	-	29	9

== Honours ==
Atlético Goianiense

- Campeonato Brasileiro Série C: 2008
- Campeonato Goiano: 2010
