= Terezópolis de Goiás =

- Municipality
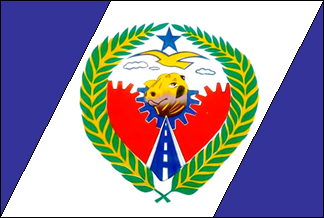
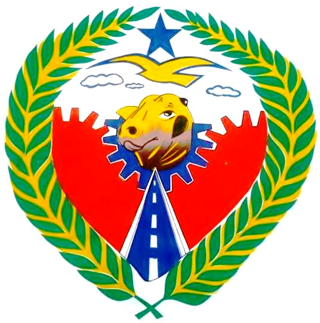
- Flag Coat of arms

- Location in Goiás state

- Location in Brazil
- Coordinates: 16°28′58″S 49°05′43″W
- Country: Brazil
- Region: Central-West
- State: Goiás
- Microregion: Goiânia Microregion

Area
  - Total: 106.9 km^{2} (41.3 sq mi)
- Elevation: 828 m (2,717 ft)

Population (2020)
  - Total: 8,186
  - Density: 76.58/km^{2} (198.3/sq mi)
- Time zone: UTC−3 (BRT)
- Postal code: 75985-000

Terezópolis de Goiás is a municipality in central Goiás state, Brazil.

== Location ==
Terezópolis is located in the Goiânia Microregion, 28 kilometers northeast of the capital, Goiânia. Neighboring municipalities are:

- north: Anápolis
- south and east: Goianápolis
- west: Nerópolis

== History ==
Terezópolis began in 1948 with the building of the important highway, BR-153, which connects the south with Belém. The town was the site of several stands along the road selling fruit, vegetables, local sweets and cheeses. Until 1992 it was called Santa Tereza and was a district of Goianápolis.

== Climate ==
The average annual temperature is 22 °C with two well defined seasons: dry and rainy. The rainy season occurs in the months of November to March. The average annual rainfall is 1,300 milliliters and the relative humidity of the air is 50% to 70%.

== Political Information ==
- Mayor: Uilton Pereira dos Santos (January 2005)
- City council: 9 members
- Eligible voters: 4,195 (12/2006)

== Demographic Information ==
- Population density: 52.54 inhabitants/km^{2} (2007)
- Urban population: 4,909 (2007)
- Rural population: 711 (2007)
- Population growth: a gain of about 1,600 people since 1996

== Economic Information ==
The economy is based on subsistence agriculture, cattle raising, services, public administration, and small transformation industries.

Due to the proximity to the urban population of Goiânia, Terezópolis has several small factories. One of them, Saty, produces ketchup and other products using the available tomatoes produced in nearby Goianápolis.

- Industrial units: 10 (2007)
- Commercial units: 39 (2007)
- Cattle herd: 11,000 head
- Main crops: oranges (110 hectares), lemons, tangerines, rice, beans, manioc, corn (250 hectares), and soybeans.

== Education (2006) ==
- Schools: 7
- Classrooms: 33
- Teachers: 70
- Students: 1,751
- Higher education: none
- Adult literacy rate: 82.4% (2000) (national average was 86.4%)

== Health (2007) ==
- Hospitals: 0
- Hospital beds: 0
- Ambulatory clinics: 1
- Infant mortality rate: 27.70 (2000) (national average was 33.0)

== Municipal Human Development Index ==
- MHDI: 0.707
- State ranking: 202 (out of 242 municipalities)
- National ranking: 2,875 (out of 5,507 municipalities)

For the complete list see Frigoletto.com

== See also ==
- List of municipalities in Goiás
