= Pedro Ludovico =

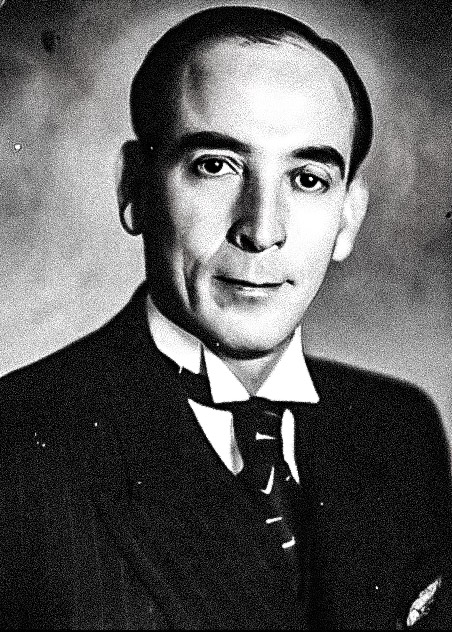
image of Pedro Ludovico

Pedro Ludovico Teixeira, better known as Pedro Ludovico (23 October 1891 – 16 August 1979) was the founder of Goiânia, Brazil, and one of the most important figures in the history of the state of Goiás.

Ludovico was born in Goiás. He went to Rio de Janeiro where he finished Medical School and was a friend of the writers, Lima Barreto and Olavo Bilac. He defended his thesis on hysteria, at a time when all of Freud's theories were revolutionary. Returning to Goiás he opened a clinic in Rio Verde, but he found life in the interior monotonous. Trips to Rio alleviated his tedium which he surpassed by discovering two loves of his life: politics and Dona Gercina Borges, whom he married.

Supporting the liberal revolution of 1930 he was nominated "interventor" in the state of Goiás. He was to govern the state for five periods, three as "interventor" and two as elected governor. He was a senator three times and his struggle for the redemocratization of the country during the period of military rule after 1964 caused the government to strip him of his political office in 1968. His iron will helped to build a new city, Goiânia, which inspired president Juscelino Kubitschek to build Brasília.

Pedro Ludovico's son was Mauro Borges, governor of the state during the military coup of 1964 and later senator for Goiás during several periods.
