= Altamiro de Moura Pacheco State Park =

State park in Goiás, Brazil

- Parque Estadual Altamiro de Moura Pacheco
- IUCN category II (national park)
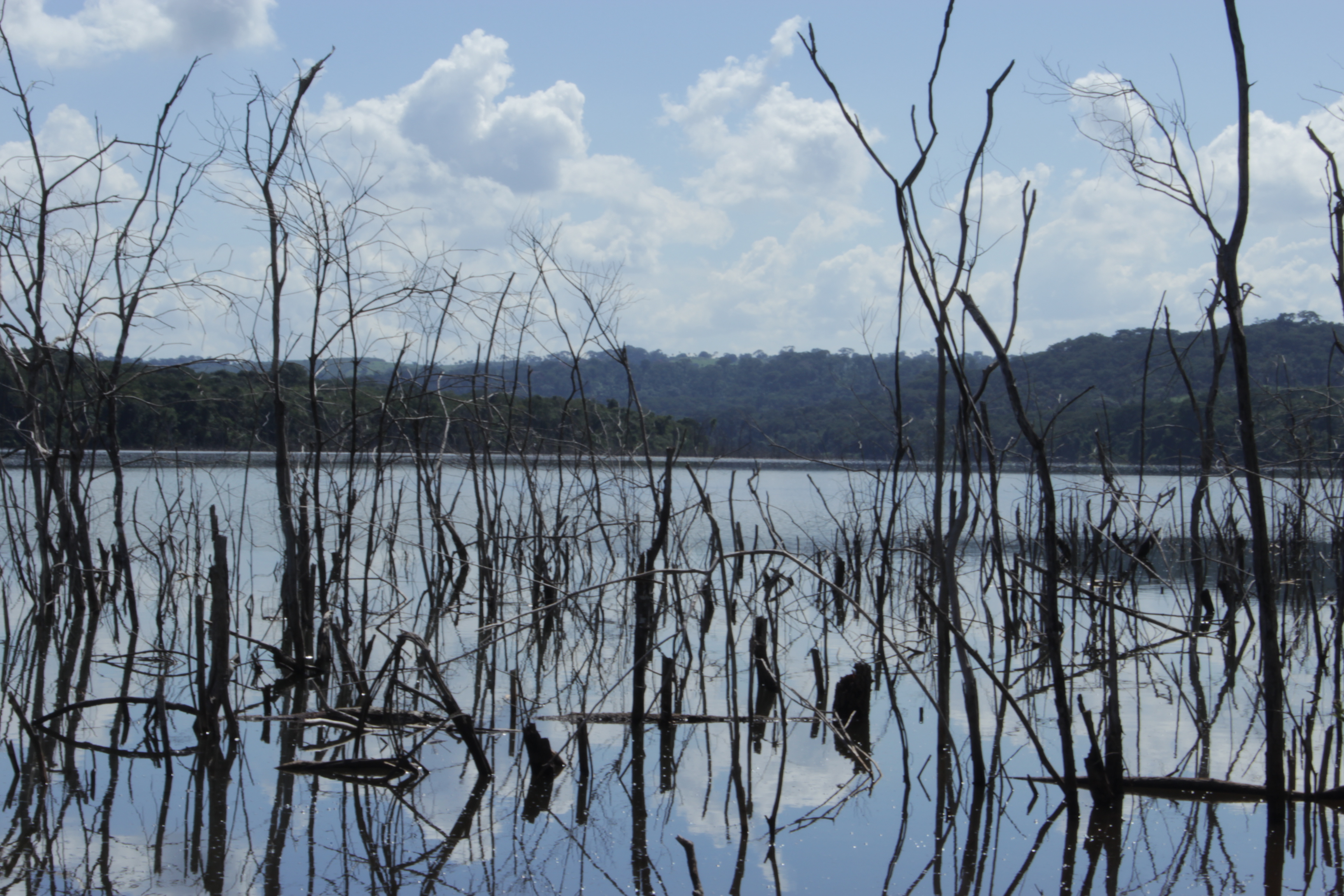
- Edge of the dam

- Location within Brazil
- Nearest city: Goianápolis, Goiás
- Coordinates: 16.534458°S 49.141101°W
- Area: 2,132 hectares (5,270 acres)
- Designation: State park
- Created: 30 December 1992

The Altamiro de Moura Pacheco State Park (Portuguese: Parque Estadual Altamiro de Moura Pacheco) is a state park in the state of Goiás, Brazil. It protects an area of dry forest beside a major reservoir that supplies water to the state capital.

== Location ==
The Altamiro de Moura Pacheco State Park is divided between the municipalities of Goianápolis, Nerópolis and Goiânia. It has an area of 2,132 hectares (5,270 acres). The park is named for Altamiro de Moura Pacheco, physician, pharmacist, writer, cattle rancher and Goian politician, former owner of the area. It is also known as the Goiânia Ecological Park (Portuguese: Parque Ecológico de Goiânia). Highway BR-153 runs through the park, and provides the main land access route.

Vegetation is mainly seasonal semi-deciduous forest and gallery forest. 485 species of plant have been recorded, in 315 genera and 97 families. Dry forest species such as Aspidosperma and Tabebuia species predominate. Most of the vegetation is dry forest and canopy forest, cerrado restricted sense, cerradão and capoeira, as well as some degraded areas that were converted to pasture. Over 290 species of animals have been identified including the endangered giant anteater (Myrmecophaga tridactyla), maned wolf (Chrysocyon brachyurus) and cougar (Puma concolor).

The park may be used for trekking, nature watching, biking and mountain biking. Guided tours may be arranged. It has beautiful landscapes, with waterfalls, but there is no waterfall or lake where bathing is allowed. Trails include the 17 kilometres (11 mi) Lago Trail, suitable for cycling, the 700 metres (2,300 ft) Peba Trail for a short walk and the 1,400 metres (4,600 ft) Coati Trail. All of these are easy. The longer Eucalyptus Trail is more difficult. The park has a visitor center with restrooms and drinking water, but there is no restaurant. As of 2016 the park was open from 8am to 4pm, Wednesday to Sunday, with free admission.

== History ==
The site of a pre-colonial village has been found that was probably occupied from 500 to 1500 AD by Indians of the southern Kayapó community, or at least of the Aratu tradition. They were farmers and ceramicists. Relics include a funeral urn and a ritual mask made of vegetable fibers. The site was vacated after the arrival of the Portuguese. Later the area was occupied by the Fazenda Dois Irmãos, used for agriculture and cattle raising.

The state park was created by law 11.471 of 3 July 1991 and defined by law 11.878 of 30 December 1992. At first it was called the Ulysses Guimaraes Ecology, Environment and Forest Preservation Park, then the Goiânia Ecological Park. In May 1994 part of the park was removed to make way for the Ribeirão João Leite Reservoir, planned to supply water to the Metropolitan Region of Goiânia, the state capital. The park was reduced in size to 2,132 hectares (5,270 acres).

Law 13,846 of 1 June 2001 renamed it the Altamiro de Moura Pacheco Ecological and Environmental Protection State Park. It is administered by the state Department of the Environment (Semarh). The purpose is to protect the largest remnant of dry forest in the central region of the state, and to protect the João Leite Reservoir, which provides water for over one million people.

In 2010 a fire burned much of the vegetation and the park was closed. It reopened in January 2012. At the opening ceremony Governor Marconi Perillo announced that the park and other conservation units in the state would be jointly managed with the private sector, in line with global trends. An open, democratic and transparent bidding process would be used to select the private manager of the park. State law 18.462 of 9 May 2014 created the João Leite State Park with an area of 2,832 hectares (7,000 acres) from part of the area taken for the reservoir. The two parks now total 4,964 hectares (12,270 acres).

== Sources ==
- Albuquerque, Marcelo (26 March 2016), "Parque Ecológico Altamiro de Moura Pacheco é opção de esporte, aventura, lazer e natureza exuberante em Goiânia", Curtamais (in Portuguese)
- Ferreira, Paula Henriques (May 2004), Parque Estadual Altamiro de Moura Pacheco e Area de Protecao Ambiental Joao Leite: Uma Proposta Para Medidas Compensatorias (PDF) (monograph) (in Portuguese), Universide de Brasilia
- Oliveira, Wagner (16 January 2012), Reaberto o Parque Estadual Altamiro de Moura Pacheco (in Portuguese)
- Parque Estadual Altamiro de Moura Pacheco (in Portuguese), SECIMA, archived from the original on 2016-03-02
