= Senador Canedo =

- Municipality
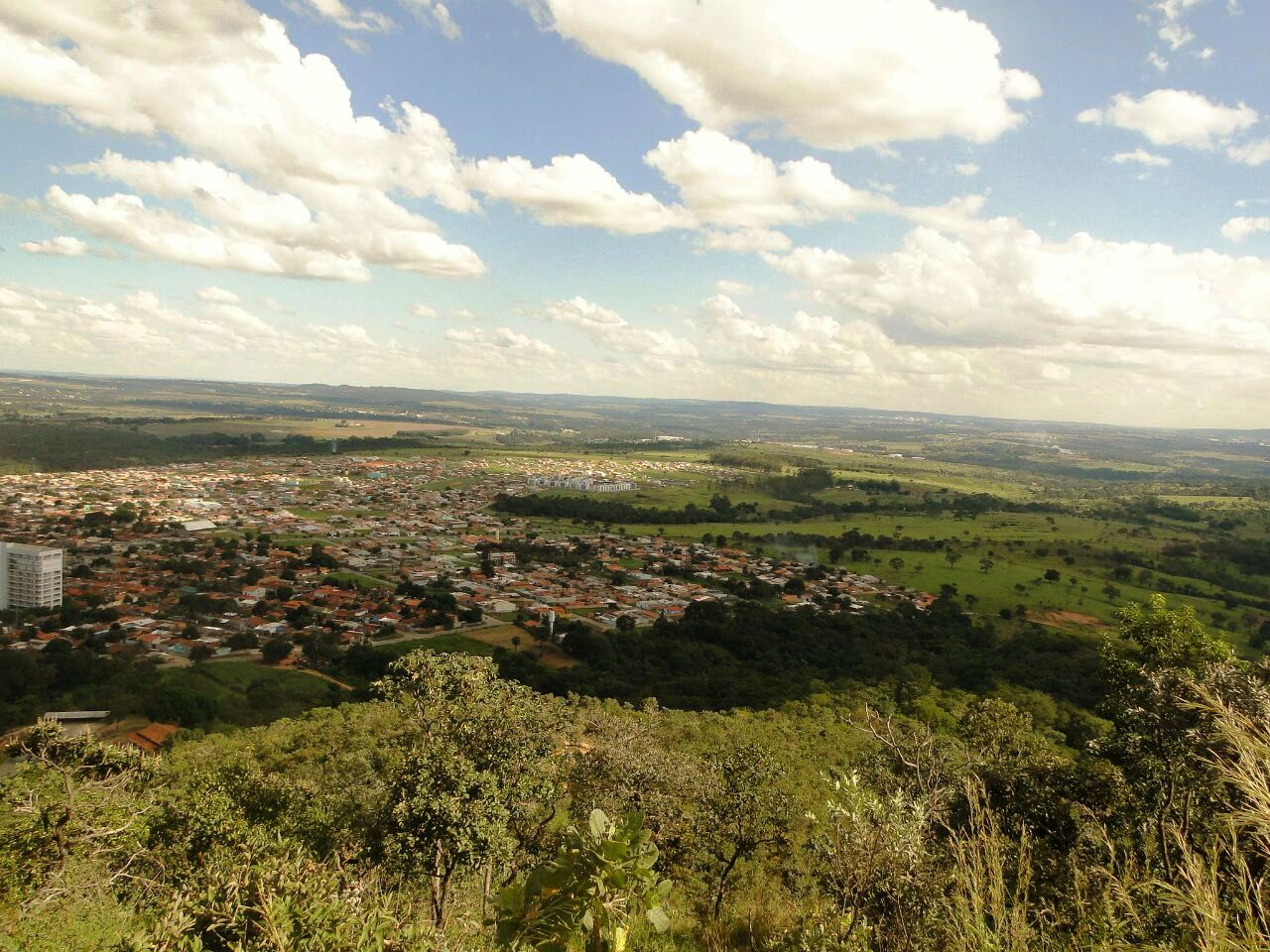

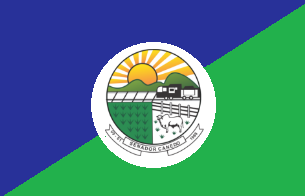
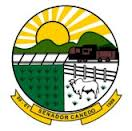
- Flag Coat of arms

- Location in Goiás state

- Location in Brazil
- Coordinates: 16°45′34″S 49°05′11″W
- Country: Brazil
- Region: Central-West
- State: Goiás
- Microregion: Goiânia Microregion

Area
  - Total: 244.7 km^{2} (94.5 sq mi)
- Elevation: 801 m (2,628 ft)

Population (2022 Census)
  - Total: 155,635
  - Estimate (2025): 175,042
  - Density: 636.0/km^{2} (1,647/sq mi)
- Time zone: UTC−3 (BRT)
- Postal code: 75250-000
- Website: www.senadorcanedo.go.gov.br

Senador Canedo is a municipality in central Goiás state, Brazil. It is the center of the petrochemical industry for the state.

== Geography ==
=== Location ===
Senador Canedo is crossed by two state highways, GOs 020 and 010. It is located 16 kilometers southeast of the state capital of Goiânia and is connected by GO-403.

Senador Canedo is part of the Goiânia Microregion, which has more than 1,700,000 inhabitants.

== Economy ==
The economy is based on agriculture, services, public administration, and transformation industries. Much of the income is generated by the petrochemical installations.

- Industrial units: 81 (2007)
- Commercial units: 416 (2007)
- Dairies: Agroindustrial Morada do Bosque Ltda (22/05/2006)
- Meat-packing plants: Coop. Ind. de Carnes e Derivados de Goiás Ltda (22/05/2006)
- Financial institutions: -- Banco Itaú S.A.

- Banco do Brasil S.A (08/2007)

- Cattle herd: 18,460 head (2006)
- Main crops: rice (120 hectares), bananas, sugarcane, oranges, tangerines, beans, manioc, corn (600 hectares), and soybeans (200 hectares).

=== Petrochemicals ===
The principal activity of the city is the petrochemical complex (Petrobras, Realpetro, Petrobol, Unip, Gasbal, and Sauro), with several related industries near the city. It is also the headquarters of major industries like Goiás Carne, Curtume Centro-Oeste, Brasil Spuma, Cicopal, Mittel Klasse Farmacêutica, Q Vida Produtos de Limpeza, Mold Pré Moldados, Fertilizantes Solo Nobre, Queiroz Produtos Alimentícios and Arpec Equipamentos Limitados.

It has a well-developed infrastructure in the transport sector, with a terminal for railroad cargo. Both the leather industry complex and the petrochemical complex were installed according to ecological concerns, and there is a sewage treatment plant. Senador Canedo is one of the fastest-growing cities in the state of Goiás.

== Politics ==
- Mayor: Divino Pereira Lemes
- Political coalition: PDT / PMDB / PL / PPS / PHS
- City council: 10 members
- Eligible voters: 44,492 (December/2007)

== Demography ==
- Population density: 288.3 inhabitants/km^{2} (2007)
- Urban population: 67,900 (2007)
- Rural population: 2,659 (2007)
- Population growth: a gain of about 48,000 people since 1991

== Education (2006) ==
- Schools: 54
- Classrooms: 380
- Teachers: 852
- Students: 25,046
- Higher education: none
- Adult literacy rate: 90.0% (2000) (national average was 86.4%)

== Health (2003) ==
- Hospitals: 1
- Hospital beds: 75
- Ambulatory clinics: 22
- Infant mortality rate: 27.70 (2000) (national average was 33.0)

== Municipal Human Development Index ==
- MHDI: 0.729
- State ranking: 147 (out of 242 municipalities)
- National ranking: 2,447 (out of 5,507 municipalities)

For the complete list see Frigoletto.com

== See also ==
- List of municipalities in Goiás
