= Goianápolis =

- Municipality
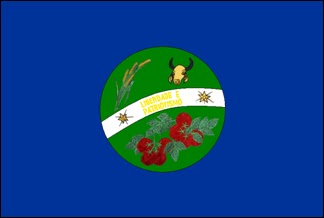
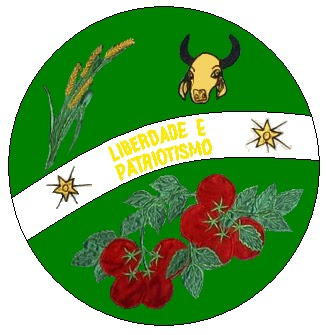
- Flag Coat of arms

- Location in Goiás state

- Location in Brazil
- Coordinates: 16°30′18″S 49°01′17″W
- Country: Brazil
- Region: Central-West
- State: Goiás
- Microregion: Goiânia Microregion

Area
  - Total: 162.3 km^{2} (62.7 sq mi)
- Elevation: 982 m (3,222 ft)

Population (2020)
  - Total: 11,224
  - Density: 69.16/km^{2} (179.1/sq mi)
- Time zone: UTC−3 (BRT)
- Postal code: 75170-000

Goianápolis is a municipality in central Goiás state, Brazil. It had a population of 11,224 (IBGE 2020 estimate) in a total area of 162.38 km^{2} (2007). The town is famous for its tomato production and as the birthplace of Leandro and Leonardo, one of the most famous country and western duos in recent Brazilian music.

== Location ==
Goianápolis, the so-called "state tomato capital", is located 33 km. northwest of the state capital of Goiânia and 11 km. south of the important Goiânia-Brasília highway. It belongs to the Goiânia Microregion. Connections with Goiânia are made by BR-457 / GO-415. It forms boundaries with Anápolis, Terezópolis de Goiás, and Leopoldo de Bulhões.

The climate is tropical humid. The hydrographic basin is formed by the streams of João Leite, Sozinha, Pindobal, Macaco, Arábia and da Gama. The water supply comes from the Ribeirão Sozinha.

The municipality contains part of the 2,132-hectare (5,270-acre) Altamiro de Moura Pacheco State Park, created in 1992.

== Political Data ==
- Eligible voters: 8,717 (2007)
- Mayor: Waldecino Ferreira Neto
- Vice-mayor: Gary Rocha de Paula
- Councilmembers: 09

== Demographic Data ==
- Population density: 68.72 inhabitants/km^{2} (2007)
- Population growth rate 2000/2007: 0.64.%
- Population in 1980: 7,569 hab
- Population in 1991: 10,716
- Urban population in 2007: 10,109
- Rural population in 2007: 1,050

== The economy ==
The main economic activity of the city was, until recently, the production of tomatoes (100 hectares in 2006), which were sold all over the country and even exported to Argentina and Paraguay. This activity has dropped off significantly in recent years. There is also production of rice, corn (400 hectares), beans, bananas, manioc, cabbage, carrots, and sugar beets. There were 15,000 head of cows in 2006. Data are from IBGE

== Economic Data ==
- Industrial units: 19 (06/2007)
- Retail units: 61 (08/2007)
- Banking institutions: BRADESCO S.A. (08/2007)

== Education and Health ==
- Literacy rate: 84.3%
- Infant mortality rate: 33.94 in 1,000 live births
- Schools: 08 (2006)
- Classrooms: 54
- Teachers: 127
- Students: 3,094
- Hospitals: 01 (2007)
- Hospital beds: 35

== History ==
The history of Goianápolis began when Pedro Ludovico Teixeira decided to transfer the capital of the state from Goiás to Goiânia in 1933. With the change, there was an increase in population from Anápolis to the region of Campininha where the new capital was being built. Families arrived in the region looking for land to plant and to raise pigs. Soon a new municipality was formed: Goianápolis—a combination of Goiânia and Anápolis.

Goianápolis is also famous in Brazil as the birthplace of Leandro and Leonardo, one of the most famous country duos in Brazilian music. See official site at Leandro e Leonardo

Human Development Index: 0.689

- State ranking: 217 (out of 242 municipalities in 2000)
- National ranking: 3,174 (out of 5,507 municipalities in 2007)

For the complete list see Frigoletto.com

== See also ==
- List of municipalities in Goiás
