= Hidrolândia, Goiás =

Hidrolândia
- Municipality
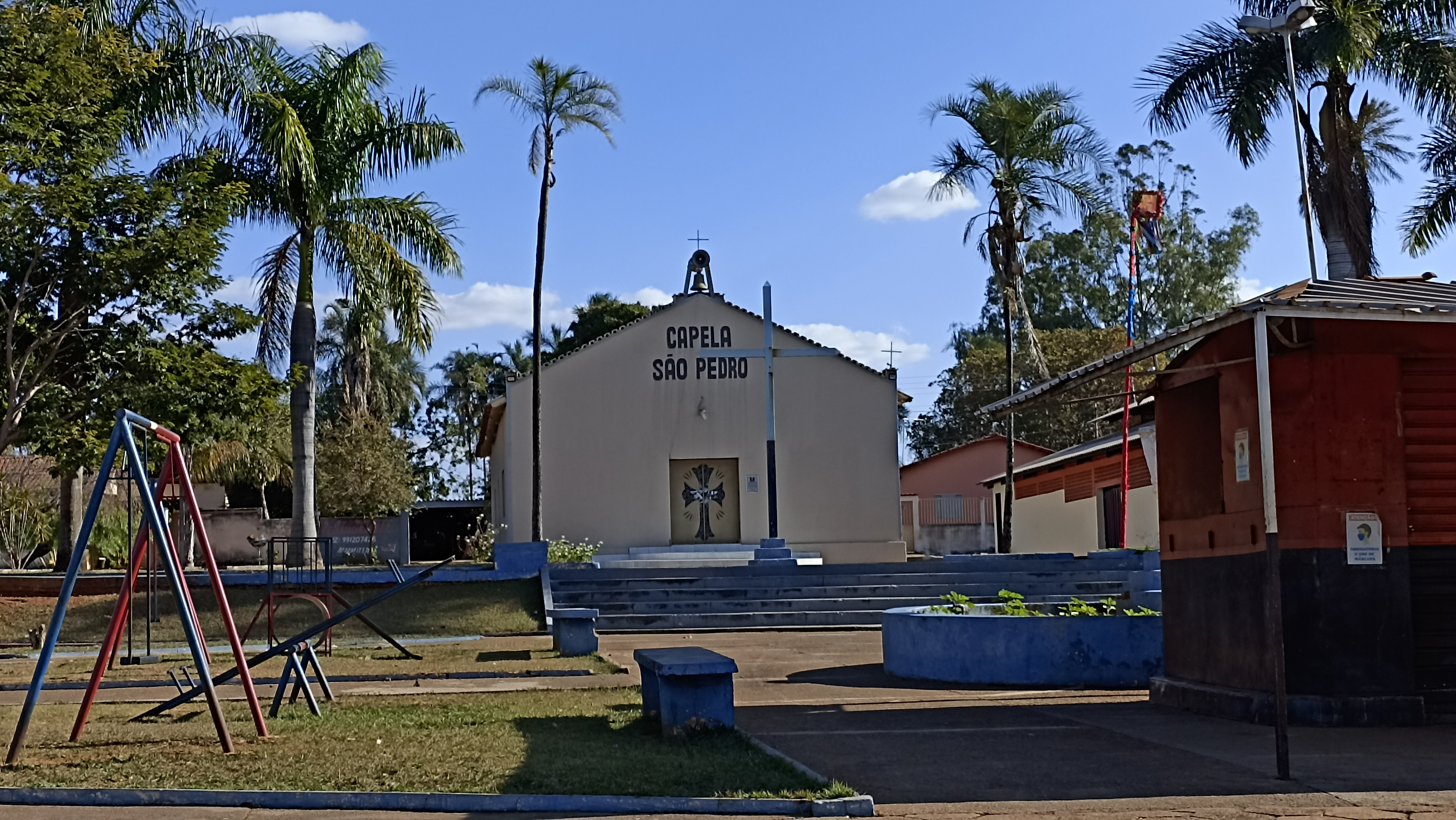

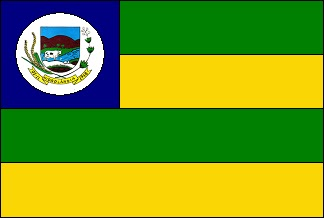
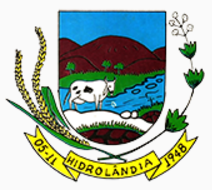
- Flag Coat of arms

- Location in Goiás state

- Location in Brazil
- Coordinates: 16°57′57″S 49°13′49″W
- Country: Brazil
- Region: Central-West
- State: Goiás
- Microregion: Goiânia Microregion

Area
  - Total: 944.2 km^{2} (364.6 sq mi)
- Elevation: 814 m (2,671 ft)

Population (2020)
  - Total: 22,124
  - Density: 23.43/km^{2} (60.69/sq mi)
- Time zone: UTC−3 (BRT)
- Postal code: 75340-000

Hidrolândia is a municipality in central Goiás state, Brazil. The population was 22,124 (2020) in a total area of 944.2 km^{2} (364.6 sq mi) (10 October 2002). Hidrolândia is a large producer of poultry and eggs.

== Location ==
Hidrolândia is located 36 km (22 mi). south of the state capital, Goiânia on important interstate highway BR-153. It belongs to the Goiânia Microregion, which contains more than one million seven hundred thousand inhabitants.

Considered the capital of the jaboticaba (a blackish tropical fruit—Myrciaria cauliflora) See Jaboticaba because of the great quantity of jaboticaba trees in the region, Hidrolândia is also known as the city of waters. The concentration of springs, bathing spots and rivers in the area gave the city this name.

== History ==
Hidrolândia began in 1895 when lands were donated to build a chapel dedicated to Santo Antônio. In 1896 it was elevated to a district with the name Santo Antônio das Grimpas belonging to Pouso Alto, which later became Piracanjuba. In 1930 it became a municipality with the name Hidrolândia, land of waters. With the construction of the new capital in Goiânia it became part of that city with the name "Grimpas". In 1948 it became municipality with its present name.

== Political and Demographic Data ==
- Eligible voters: 11,844 (December 2007)
- Mayor: Wilton Moreira Alves (January 2005)
- Vice-mayor: Nivaldo Vieira Vaz
- Councilmembers: 9
- Population growth rate 2000/2007: 0.97%
- Population in 1980: 8,559
- Population in 1991: 10,254
- Urban population in 2007: 9,615
- Rural population in 2007: 4,389

== The economy ==
The economy of the city is based on dairy cattle. There are large dairies in the area, supplying milk products to Goiânia. Local farmers also produce oranges, manioc, corn, tangerines, sugarcane, watermelon, pineapple, bananas, coconuts and rice.

Economic Data

- Industrial units: 37 (June 2007)
- Retail units: 108 (August 2007)
- Banking institutions: BRADESCO S.A. - Banco Itaú S.A. (1 June 2005)
- Dairies: Marajoara Ind. de Laticínios Ltda. (7 June 2005)
- Meatpacking plant or egg collection unit: Gransapa Ovos Ltda. (7 June 2005)
- Cooperatives: - Coop. Eletrif. Desenv. Rural de Hidrolândia Ltda - CEDRHIL - Coop. de Produção Artesanal de Hidrolândia-COOPERARTH

(17/06/2005)

Main agricultural activities:

- Cattle raising: 86,550 head (2006)
- Poultry: 601,480
- Agriculture: rice (300 hectares (740 acres)), sugarcane, coffee, coconuts, manioc, corn, oranges, and soybeans. Statistics are from IBGE

== Education and Health ==
- Literacy rate: 87.0%
- Infant mortality rate: 25.35 in 1,000 live births
- Schools: 23 (2006)
- Classrooms: 108
- Teachers: 186
- Students: 4,195
- Hospitals: 1 (2007)
- Hospital beds: 25
- Walk-in public health clinics: 8

Human Development Index: 0.736

- State ranking: 124 (out of 242 municipalities)
- National ranking: 2,280 (out of 5,507 municipalities)

For the complete list see Frigoletto

== See also ==
- List of municipalities in Goiás
