= Goiânia =

Capital city of Goiás, Brazil

- Municipality
- Municipality of Goiânia
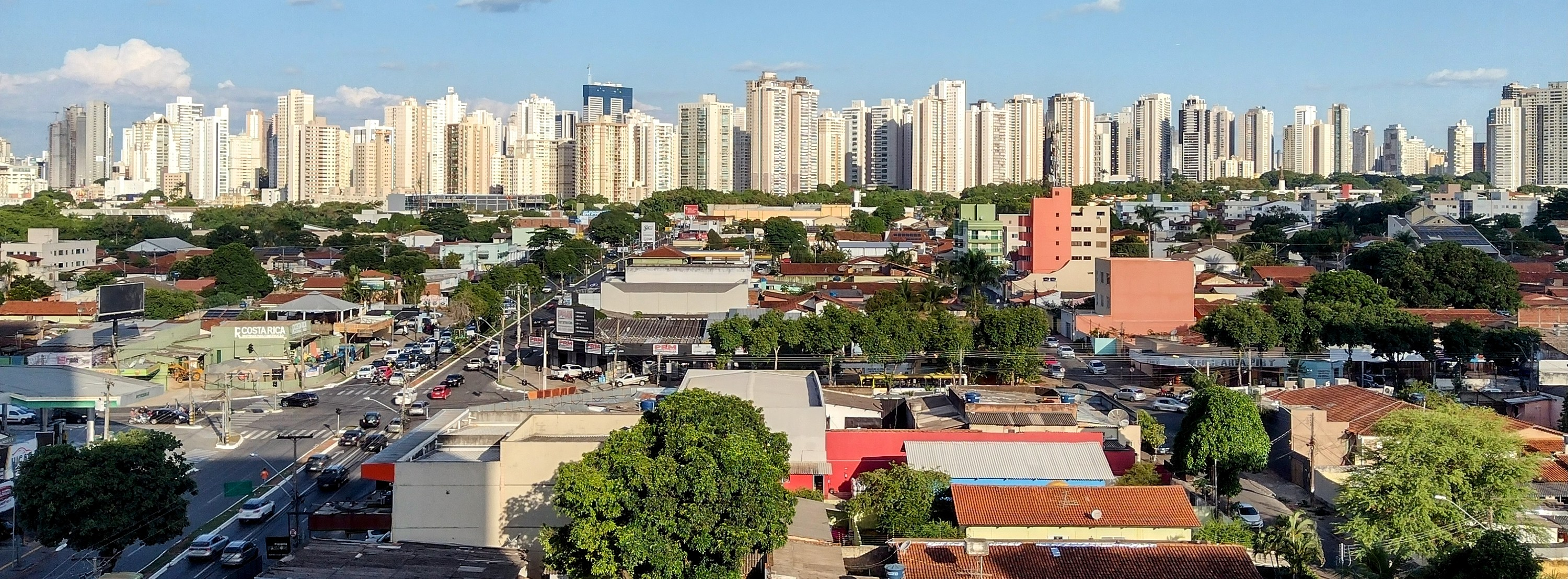
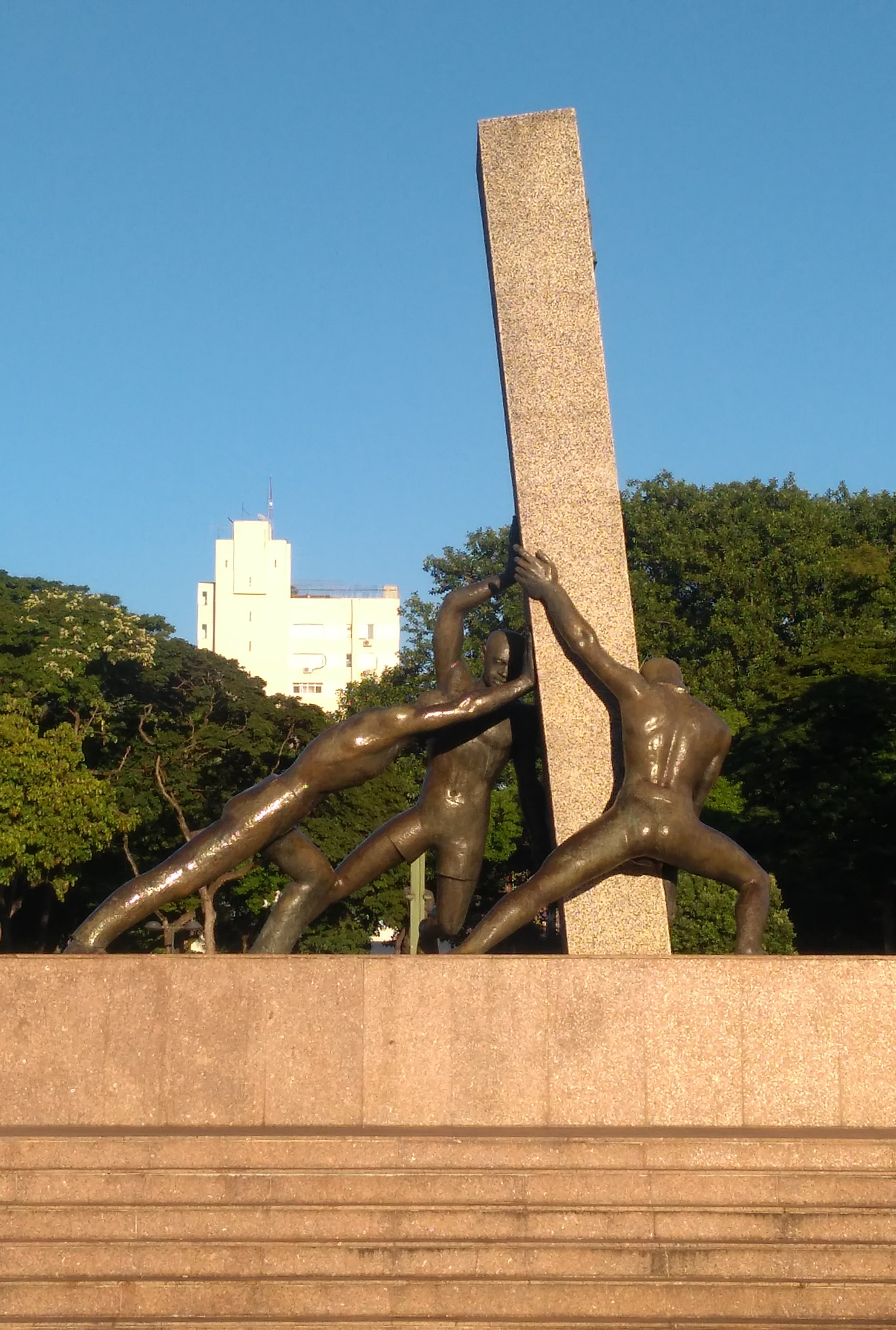
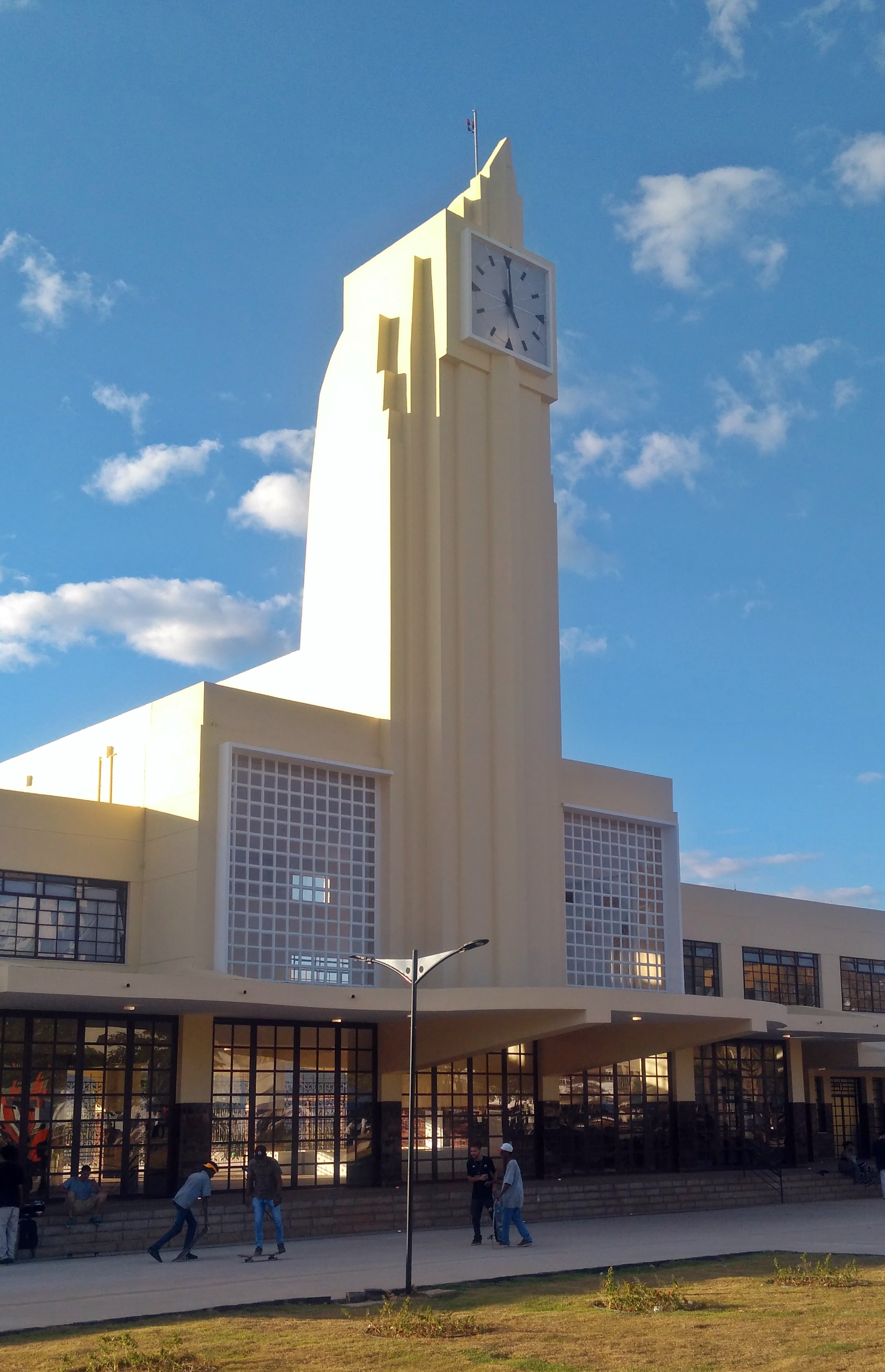
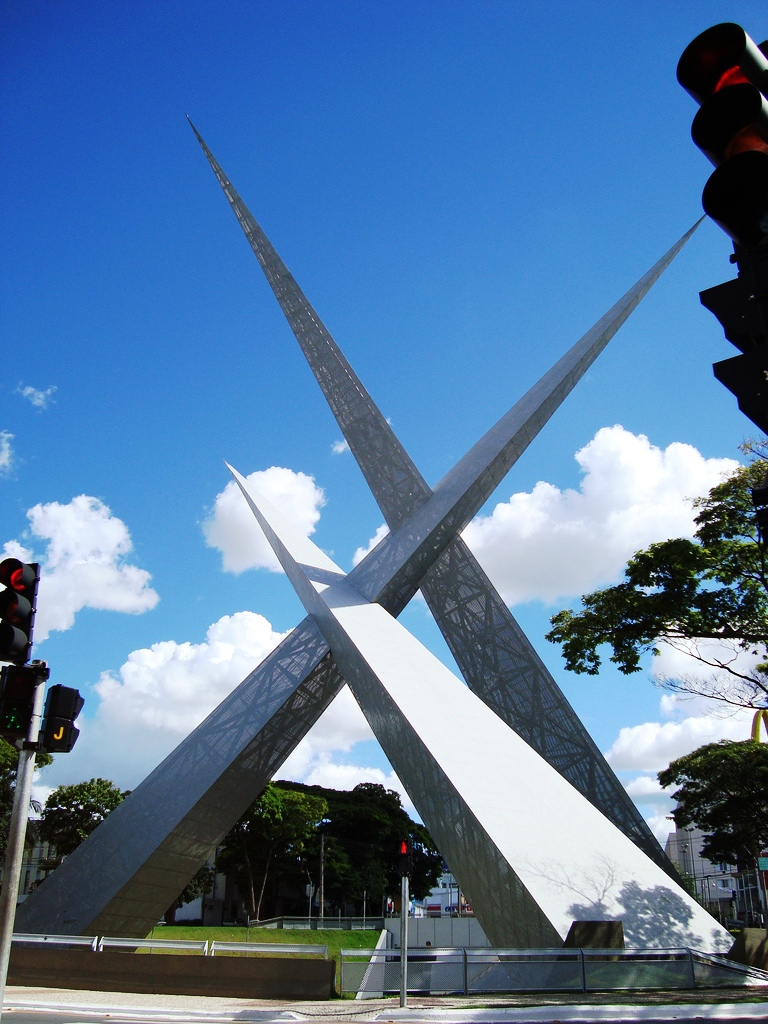
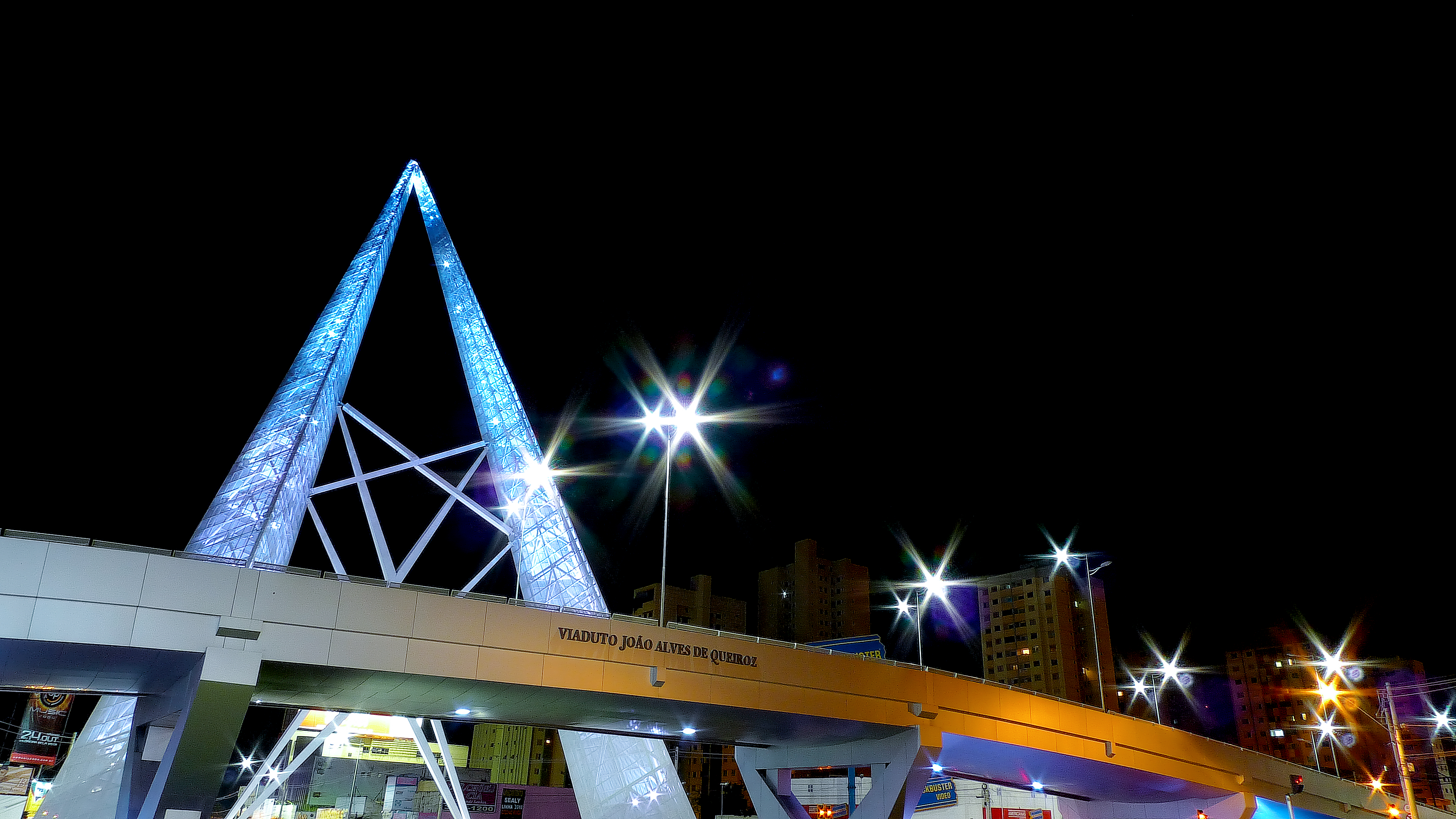
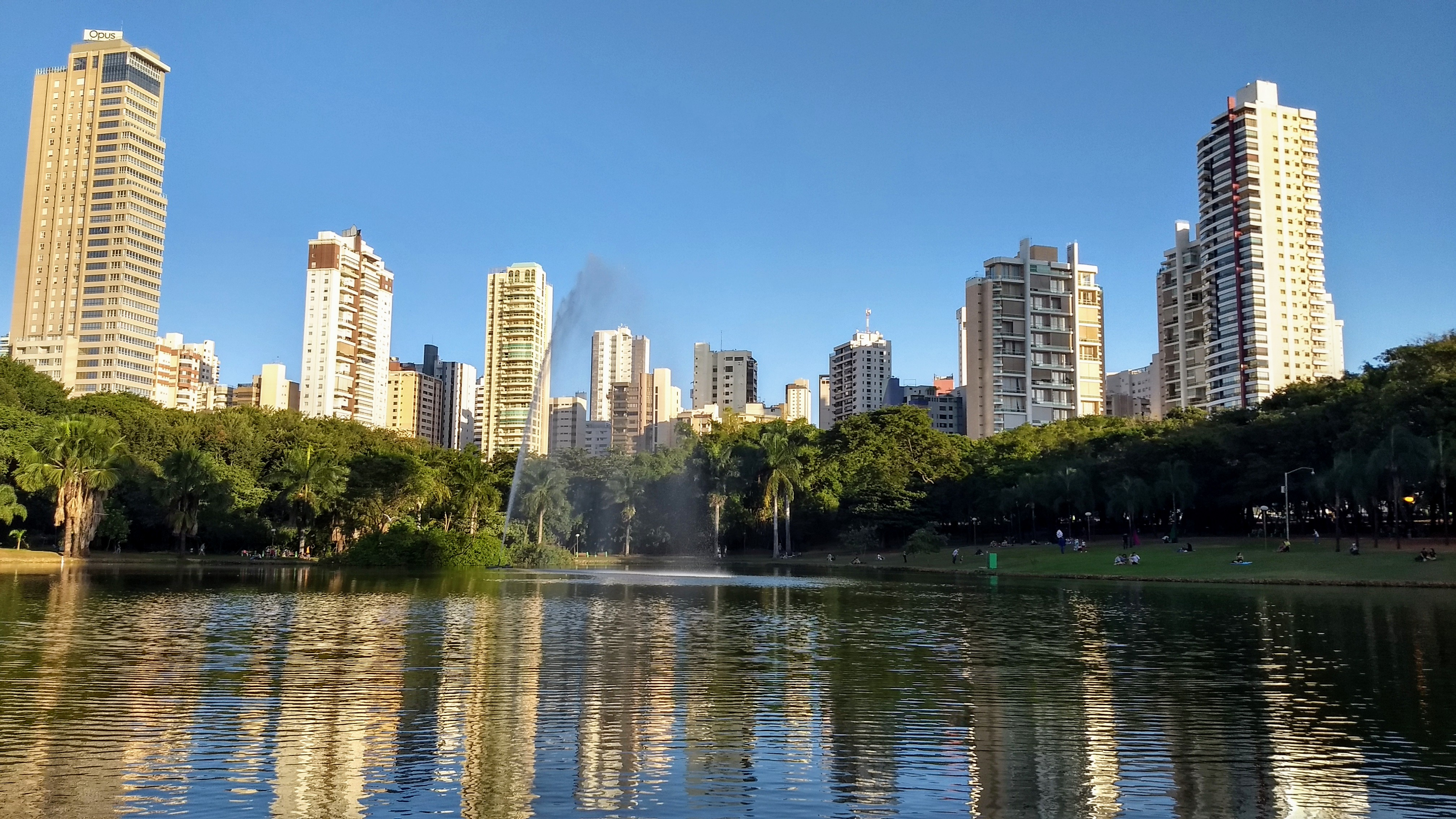
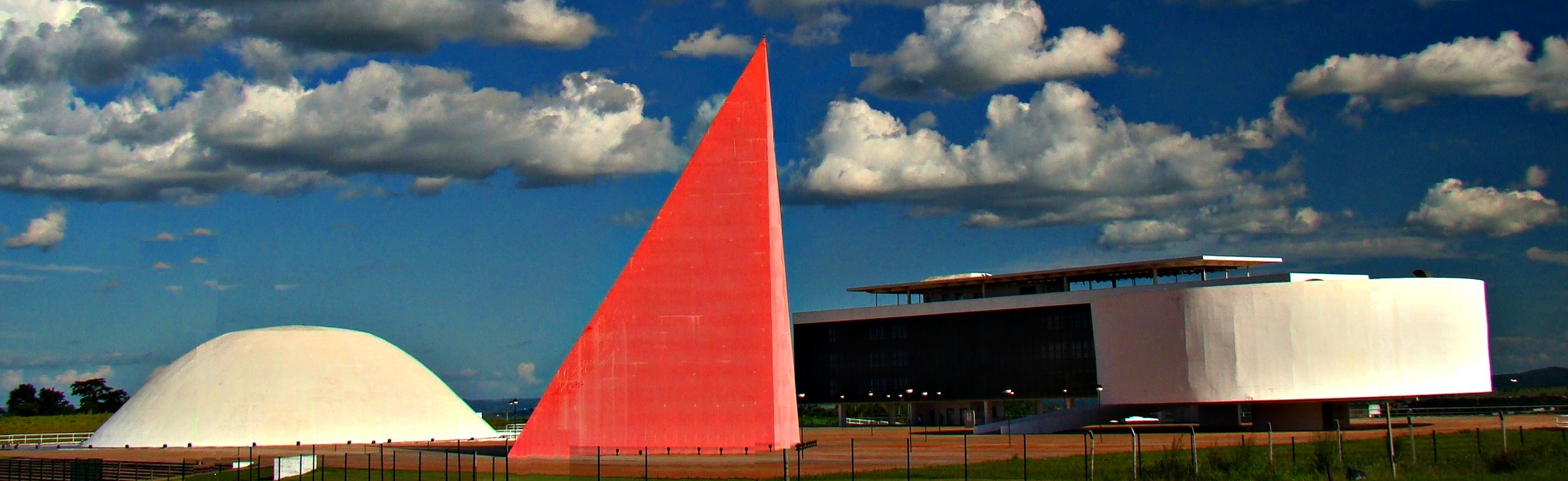
- Skyline of Goiânia Monument to the Three Races Train Station Viaduct Latif Sebba Viaduct João Alves de Queiroz Vaca Brava Park Oscar Niemeyer Cultural Center

- Flag Coat of arms
- Nickname: Capital do Cerrado (Capital of the Cerrado)
- Location of Goiânia

- Location in Brazil
- Coordinates: 16°40′S 49°15′W
- Country: Brazil
- Region: Central-West
- State: Goiás
- Founded: October 24, 1933

Government
  - Mayor: Sandro Mabel (União Brasil)

Area
  - Municipality: 789 km^{2} (305 sq mi)
  - Metro: 739 km^{2} (285 sq mi)
- Elevation: 749 m (2,457 ft)

Population (2025)
  - Municipality: 1,503,256 (10th)
  - Density: 1,604/km^{2} (4,150/sq mi)
  - Metro: 2,890,418 (12th)
- Demonym: goianiense

GDP (PPP, constant 2015 values)
  - Year: 2023
  - Total: $32.9 billion
- Time zone: UTC-3:00 (UTC-3:00)
- Postal code: 74000-000
- Area code: +55 62
- HDI (2010): 0.799 – high
- Website: www.goiania.go.gov.br

Goiânia (/ɡɔɪˈɑːniə/ goy-AH-nee-ə; Brazilian Portuguese: [ɡo(j)ˈjɐniɐ]) is the capital and largest city of the Brazilian state of Goiás. With a population of 1,536,097, it is the second-largest city in the Central-West Region and the 10th-largest in the country. Its metropolitan area has a population of 2,890,418, making it the 12th-largest in Brazil. With an area of approximately 739 square kilometres (285 square miles), it has a continuous geography with few hills and lowlands, with flat lands in most of its territory, especially the Meia Ponte River, in addition to Botafogo and Capim Puba streams.

Goiânia has its origins as a planned city, founded on October 24, 1933, by then Governor Pedro Ludovico to serve as the new state capital and administrative center. Before this, the state capital was the town of Goiás.

It is the second most populous city in the Central-West Region, only surpassed by the country's capital Brasília, located about 200 kilometers (120 miles) from Goiânia. The city is an important economic hub of the region and is considered a strategic center for such areas as industry, medicine, fashion and agriculture. Goiânia has previously been described as having the largest green area per inhabitant in Brazil and the second-most in the world, after Edmonton, Alberta, Canada. With rapid population growth and urban expansion, satellite imagery shows the majority of the green area is now at the periphery of its sprawling city limits, and the per-capita green area claim may need to be reviewed.

== History ==
The idea of creating a new state capital had been bounced around from early on in the state of Goiás. The first plan came from D. Marcos de Noronha who in 1753 wanted to establish the state capital in the municipality of Pirenópolis; again in 1863 José Vieira Couto de Magalhães put forward a plan to move the capital to the edge of the Araguaia river.

The impetus behind the efforts to move the state capital was the need to locate it in accordance with the economic interests of the state. The first state capital, Vila Boa (today City of Goiás), had been chosen when the economy was based on gold extraction. Later, when cattle-raising and agriculture came to dominate the state's development, the old capital was considered remote.

Legislators kept the idea of change alive for a long time. In 1891, the constitutional delegates officially included the idea of transferring the capital in the constitution, which was ratified in 1898 and again in 1918.

Vaguely remembered until 1930, the idea became a reality during the government of Pedro Ludovico, who was the new governor appointed for the state of Goiás after the military revolt of 1930. In 1932, a commission was created to choose where the new capital would be built. The choice was the municipality of Campinas. The mayor at the time, Andrelino Rodrigues de Moraes, accepted the plan and donated about 242 acres of his land to build the new state capital. In 1933 the commission decided on the present location and the foundation stone was laid.

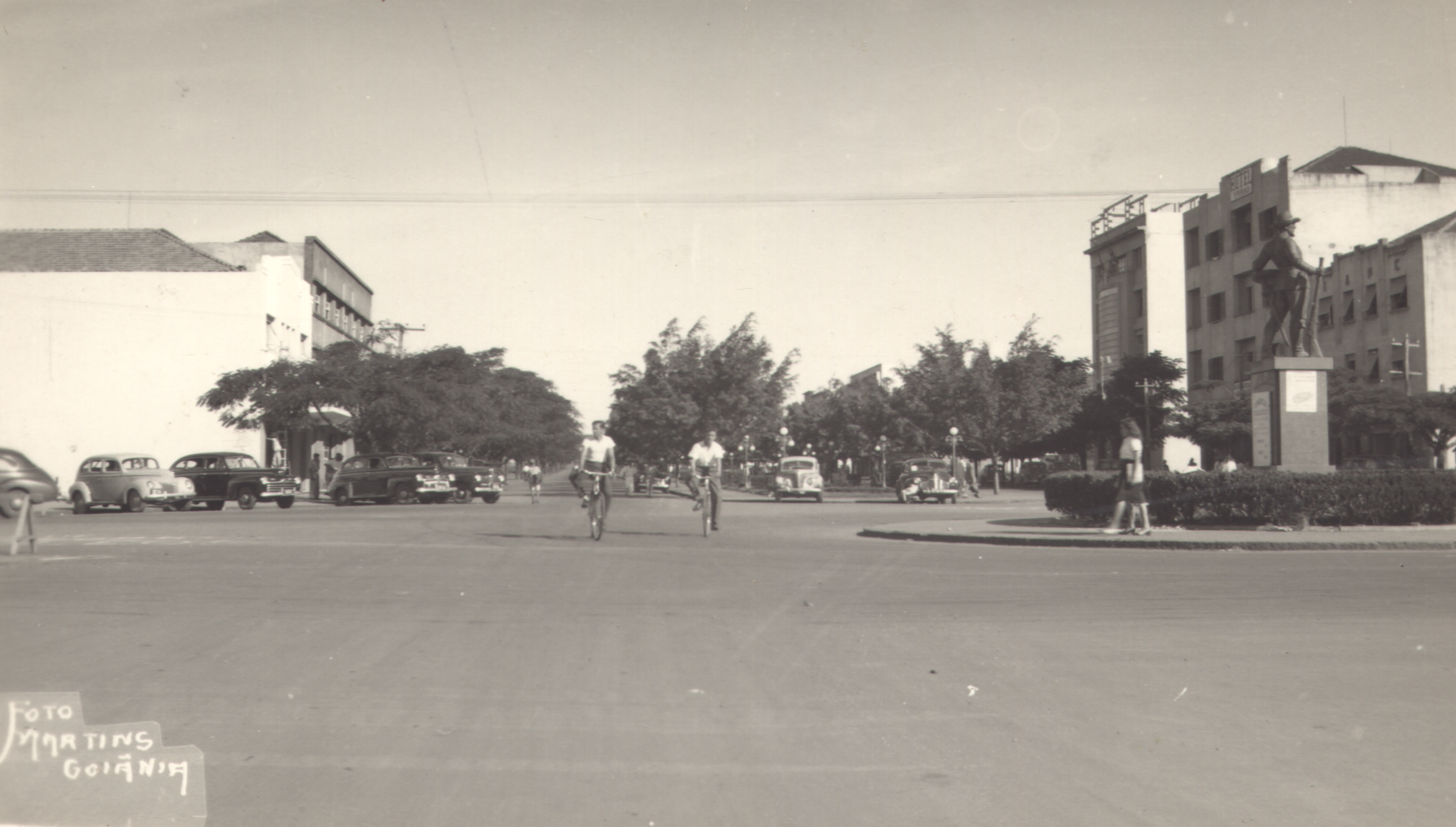
Anhanguera Avenue in Goiânia in 1960.

The plan was for a city of 50,000 with the shape of a concentric radius — streets in the form of a spoke, with the Praça Cívica as the center, with the seats of the state and municipal government — the Palace of Emeralds and the Palace of Campinas.

In 1937, a decree was signed transferring the state capital from the Cidade de Goiás to Goiânia. The official inauguration occurred in 1942 with the presence of the president of the republic, governors, and ministers.

The name, Goiânia, came about in 1933 after a contest was held by a local newspaper. Readers from all over the state contributed, with some of the most popular names being Petrônia, Americana, Petrolândia, Goianópolis, Goiânia, Bartolomeu Bueno, Campanha, Eldorado, Anhanguera, Liberdade, Goianésia, and Pátria Nova, among others. In 1935 Pedro Ludovico used the name Goiânia for the first time, signing a decree creating the municipality.

=== Art deco ===
The first buildings in this planned city, designed by Attilio Correia Lima, were inspired by art deco. The collection of buildings is still representative, with 22 of them listed as National Heritage. Mostly built in the 1940s and 1950s, they have been recognized by the National Institute of Historical and Artistic Heritage. The 22 buildings and monuments are in the original center of Goiânia, as in the pioneering nucleus of Campinas, a town existing before Goiânia. Due to lack of maintenance, several of these buildings are in a state of disrepair.

=== Radiation incident ===
On September 13, 1987, a medical radiation source containing radioactive caesium-137 was stolen from an abandoned hospital in the city, causing four deaths and many non-fatal cases of radiation poisoning. The incident was caused by radioactive Caesium salt. The soft bluish glow attracted many curious citizens who would take grains of the salt for themselves and family members in the form of jewelry. Those who had not taken any of the salt but were in close contact with it also helped the spread of radiation sickness that set in within hours to days of exposure. Several city blocks had to be demolished due to the contamination. The International Atomic Energy Agency report noted that city and state officials acted with remarkable speed to prevent further injury to the population. The former owner of the health clinic where the container was taken from was barred from retrieving some equipment from the building by court appointed guards. The owner then ominously warned that the guards would be responsible for what happened with "the Caesium bomb", referring to the radiotherapy machine that would be responsible for the incident.

== Geography ==
=== Climate ===
The city has a tropical wet and dry climate (Köppen: Aw) with an average temperature of 23.2 °C (73.8 °F). It has a wet season, from October to April, and a dry one, from May to September. Annual rainfall is around 1,300 mm (51 in).

The lowest temperature ever recorded was 0.5 °C (32.9 °F) on July 18, 2000, in the suburbs. 1.2 °C (34.2 °F) was the lowest recorded downtown, on July 9, 1938. However, such lows are very rare. Temperatures may fall below 12 °C (54 °F) every winter, mainly in the suburbs. The highest temperature ever recorded was 41.2 °C (106.2 °F) on October 7, 2020.

Climate data for Goiânia (1991–2020)
Month	Jan	Feb	Mar	Apr	May	Jun	Jul	Aug	Sep	Oct	Nov	Dec	Year
Record high °C (°F)	35.2 (95.4)	34.6 (94.3)	34.4 (93.9)	34.0 (93.2)	33.7 (92.7)	32.6 (90.7)	33.3 (91.9)	36.2 (97.2)	39.9 (103.8)	41.2 (106.2)	36.2 (97.2)	35.4 (95.7)	41.2 (106.2)
Mean daily maximum °C (°F)	30.6 (87.1)	31.0 (87.8)	30.9 (87.6)	31.2 (88.2)	30.3 (86.5)	30.0 (86.0)	30.6 (87.1)	32.7 (90.9)	34.0 (93.2)	33.2 (91.8)	31.1 (88.0)	30.6 (87.1)	31.4 (88.4)
Daily mean °C (°F)	24.7 (76.5)	24.7 (76.5)	24.7 (76.5)	24.8 (76.6)	23.3 (73.9)	22.3 (72.1)	22.5 (72.5)	24.5 (76.1)	26.3 (79.3)	26.2 (79.2)	25.0 (77.0)	24.8 (76.6)	24.5 (76.1)
Mean daily minimum °C (°F)	20.1 (68.2)	20.0 (68.0)	20.0 (68.0)	19.3 (66.7)	16.9 (62.4)	15.2 (59.4)	14.8 (58.6)	16.6 (61.9)	19.4 (66.9)	20.3 (68.5)	20.3 (68.5)	20.2 (68.4)	18.6 (65.5)
Record low °C (°F)	9.1 (48.4)	15.4 (59.7)	14.0 (57.2)	11.2 (52.2)	5.7 (42.3)	3.5 (38.3)	0.5 (32.9)	6.8 (44.2)	10.4 (50.7)	13.7 (56.7)	14.4 (57.9)	12.9 (55.2)	0.5 (32.9)
Average precipitation mm (inches)	249.2 (9.81)	235.8 (9.28)	258.5 (10.18)	137.7 (5.42)	30.3 (1.19)	8.4 (0.33)	1.5 (0.06)	9.5 (0.37)	44.3 (1.74)	144.1 (5.67)	219.6 (8.65)	271.9 (10.70)	1,610.8 (63.4)
Average precipitation days (≥ 1.0 mm)	17	16	17	9	3	1	0	1	4	11	16	18	113
Average relative humidity (%)	72.2	72.2	72.4	66.2	59.9	55.1	48.0	40.8	44.9	57.2	69.3	72.6	60.9
Average dew point °C (°F)	19.8 (67.6)	19.8 (67.6)	19.9 (67.8)	18.8 (65.8)	16.2 (61.2)	14.2 (57.6)	12.4 (54.3)	11.7 (53.1)	13.9 (57.0)	17.3 (63.1)	19.3 (66.7)	19.8 (67.6)	16.9 (62.5)
Mean monthly sunshine hours	182.9	158.2	204.6	228.0	251.1	270.0	288.3	282.1	213.0	189.1	174.0	173.6	2,614.9
Mean daily sunshine hours	5.9	5.6	6.6	7.6	8.1	9.0	9.3	9.1	7.1	6.1	5.8	5.6	7.2
Mean daily daylight hours	13	12.6	12.2	11.7	11.3	11.1	11.3	11.6	12.0	12.5	12.9	13.1	12.1
Average ultraviolet index	16	16	14	13	10	8	9	11	12	15	16	16	13
Source 1: Instituto Nacional de Meteorologia
Source 2: Weather atlas(sun-Daylight) Nomadseason(UV (Note: Average UV index for 12:00 local time))

=== Flora and fauna ===
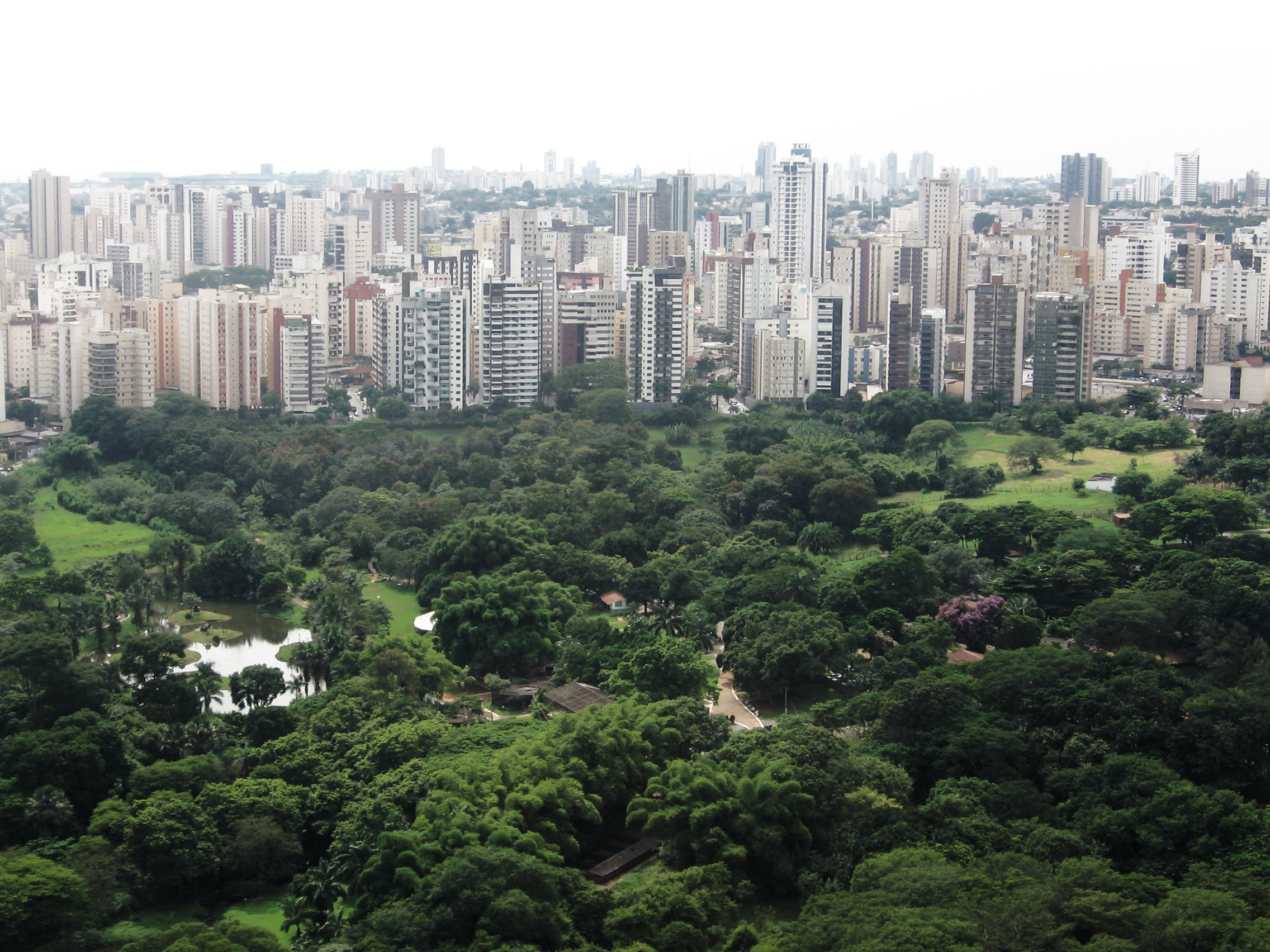
Green area in Goiânia.

The "cerrado" landscape is characterized by extensive savanna formations crossed by gallery forests and stream valleys and includes various types of vegetation. Humid fields and "buriti" palm paths are found where the water table is near the surface. Alpine pastures occur at higher altitudes and mesophytic forests on more fertile soils.

More than 1600 species of mammals, birds and reptiles have been identified in the cerrado, including 180 reptile species, 113 amphibians, 837 birds and 195 mammals (WWF). Among the invertebrates, the most notable are the termites and the leaf-cutter ants ("saúvas"). They are the main herbivores of the cerrado, important to consuming and decomposing of organic matter, as well as constituting an important food source to many other animal species.

== Economy ==
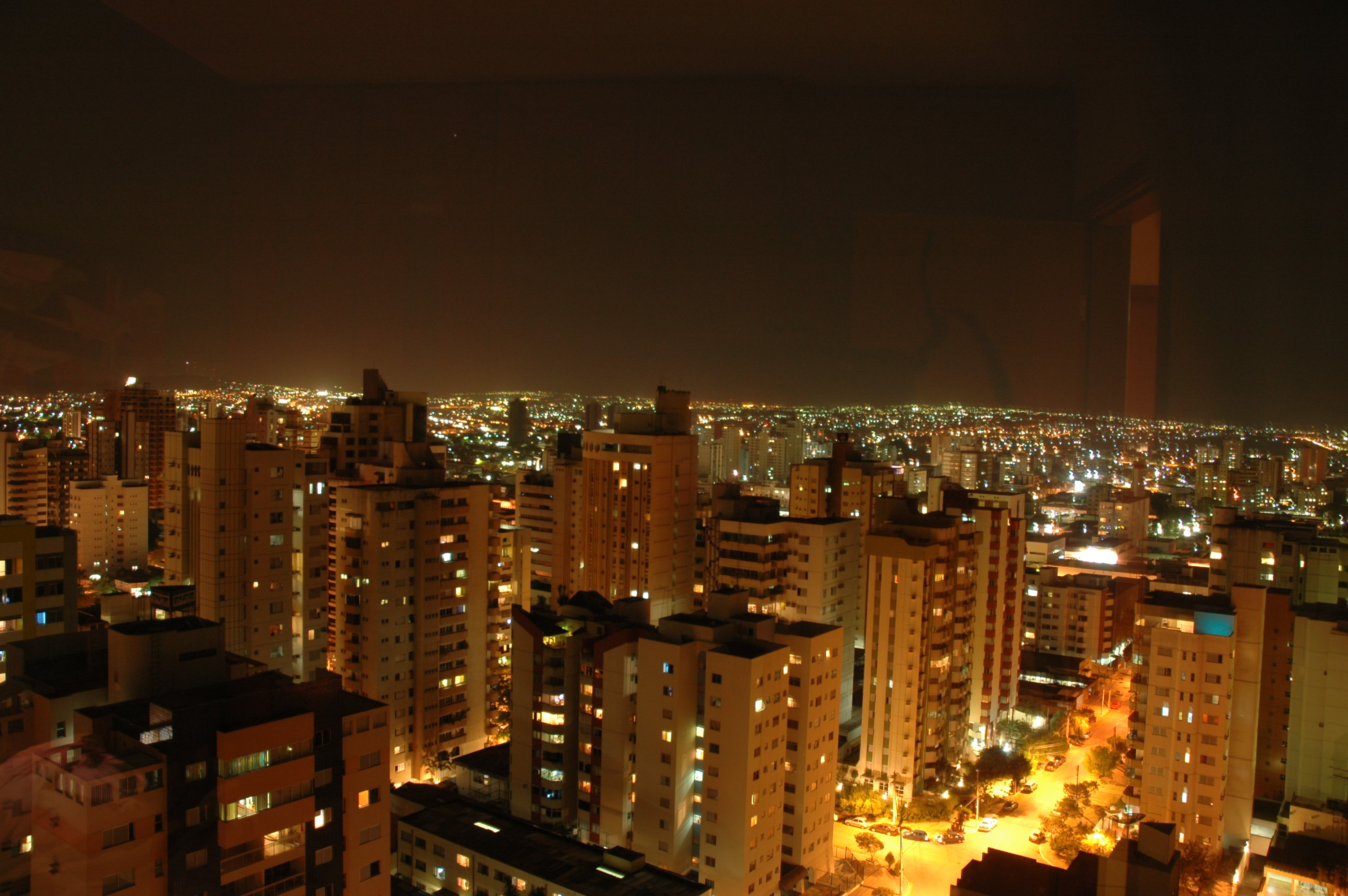
Downtown Goiânia at night.

While Goiânia's economy today is based on a variety of industries, the local economy's roots are found in the agricultural industry thriving in and around the city. The supply of agricultural equipment, tools, fertilizer and other products make up a large portion of the economic activity.

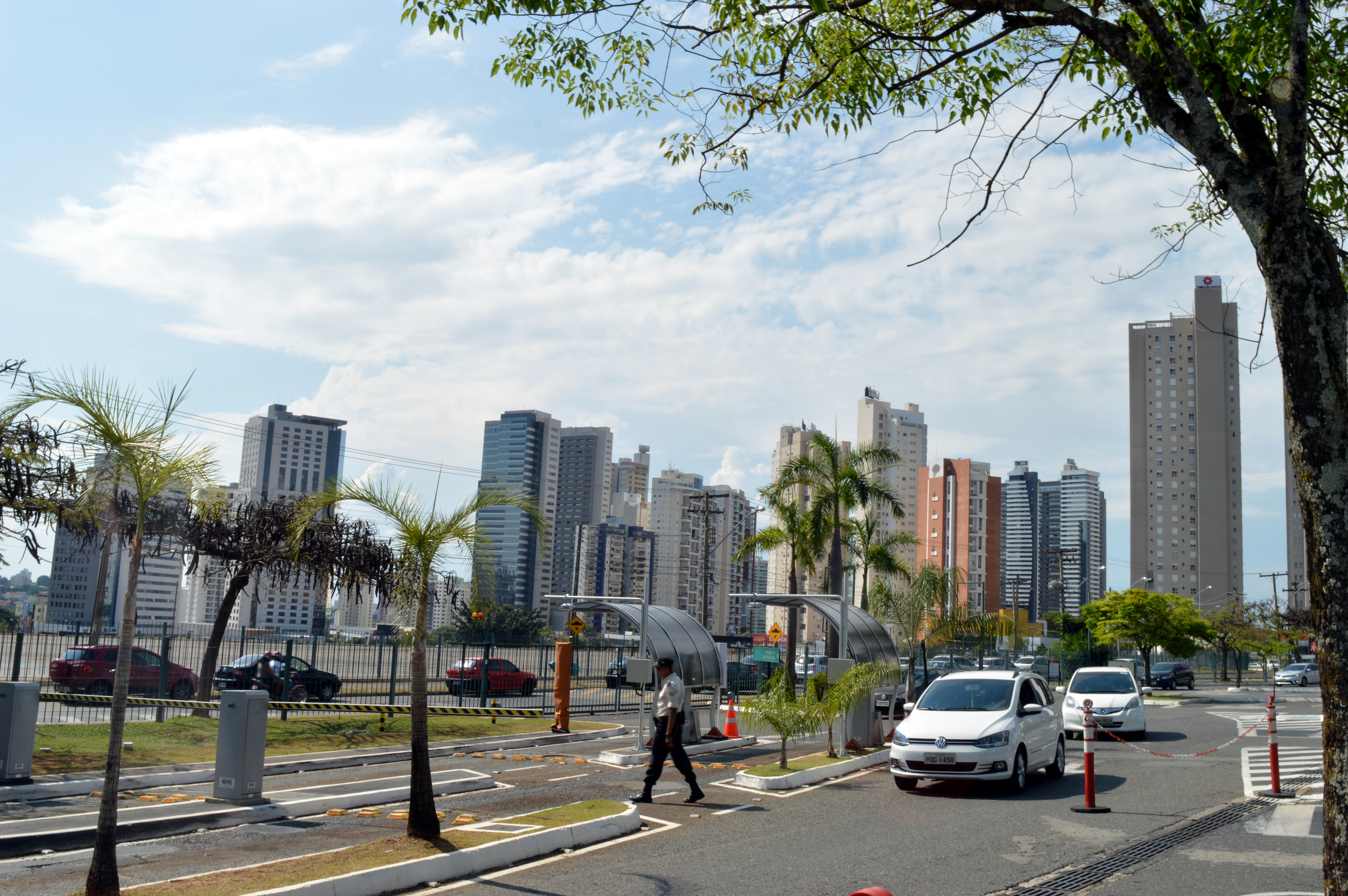
Entrance of Flamboyant Mall in Goiânia.

Second to agriculture are vehicle sales and service industry. Repairs, sales and reconditioning of vehicles are widespread and visible in all areas of the city.

The third largest contributor to the economy is the government sector. As Goiânia is the state capital of Goiás, it is home to many federal and state government agencies that provide a large number of jobs.

In recent years, modern telecommunications, with its supporting industry, has begun to expand into Goiânia. Many large Brazilian companies have established offices in the city.

In addition, due to Goiânia being the state capital, it is home to countless private medical centers/clinics of all kinds.

In 2005, the GDP of the city was R$13,354,065.00.

In the same year, the per capita income for the city was R$11,119.

== Demographics ==
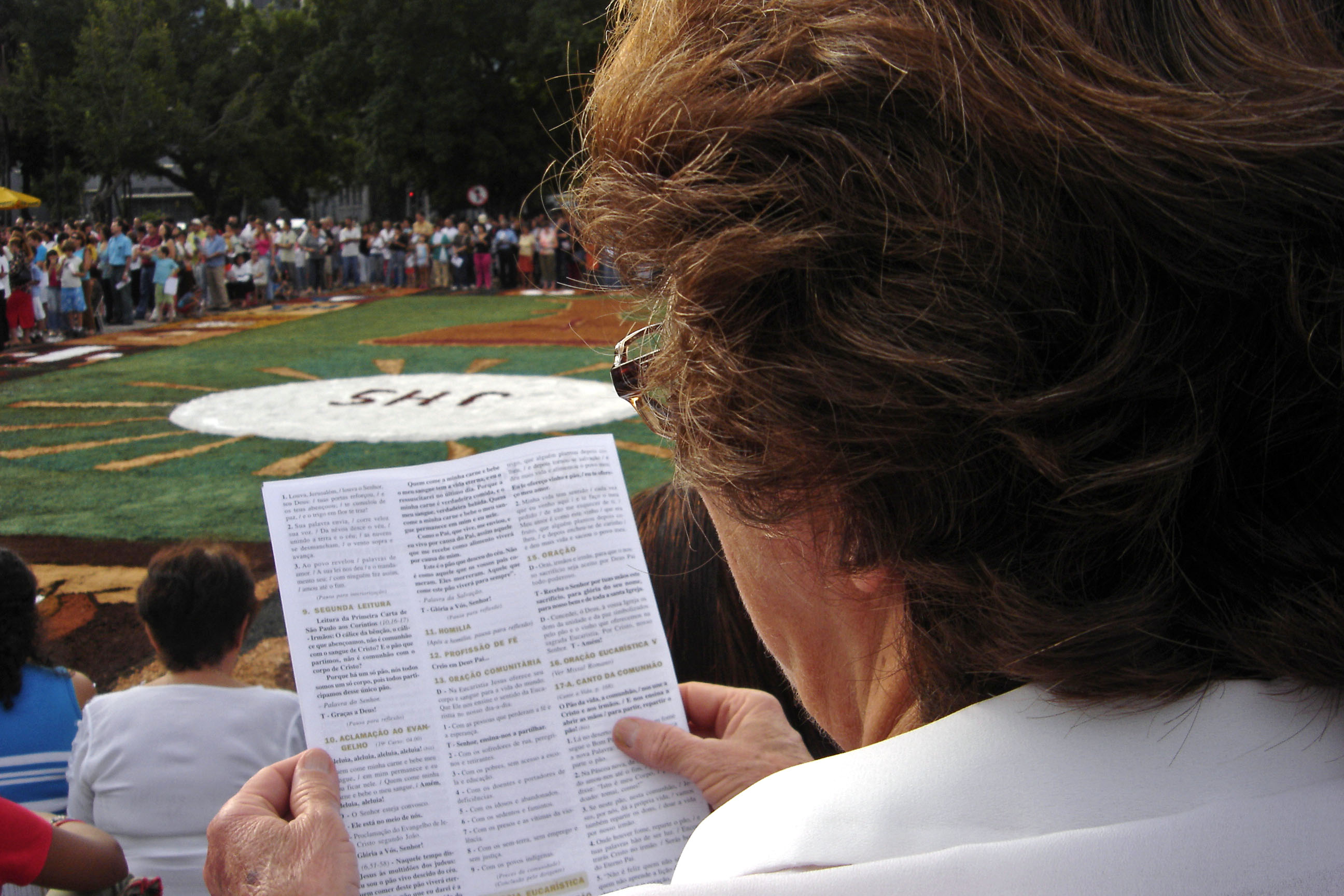
Feast of Corpus Christi in Goiânia.

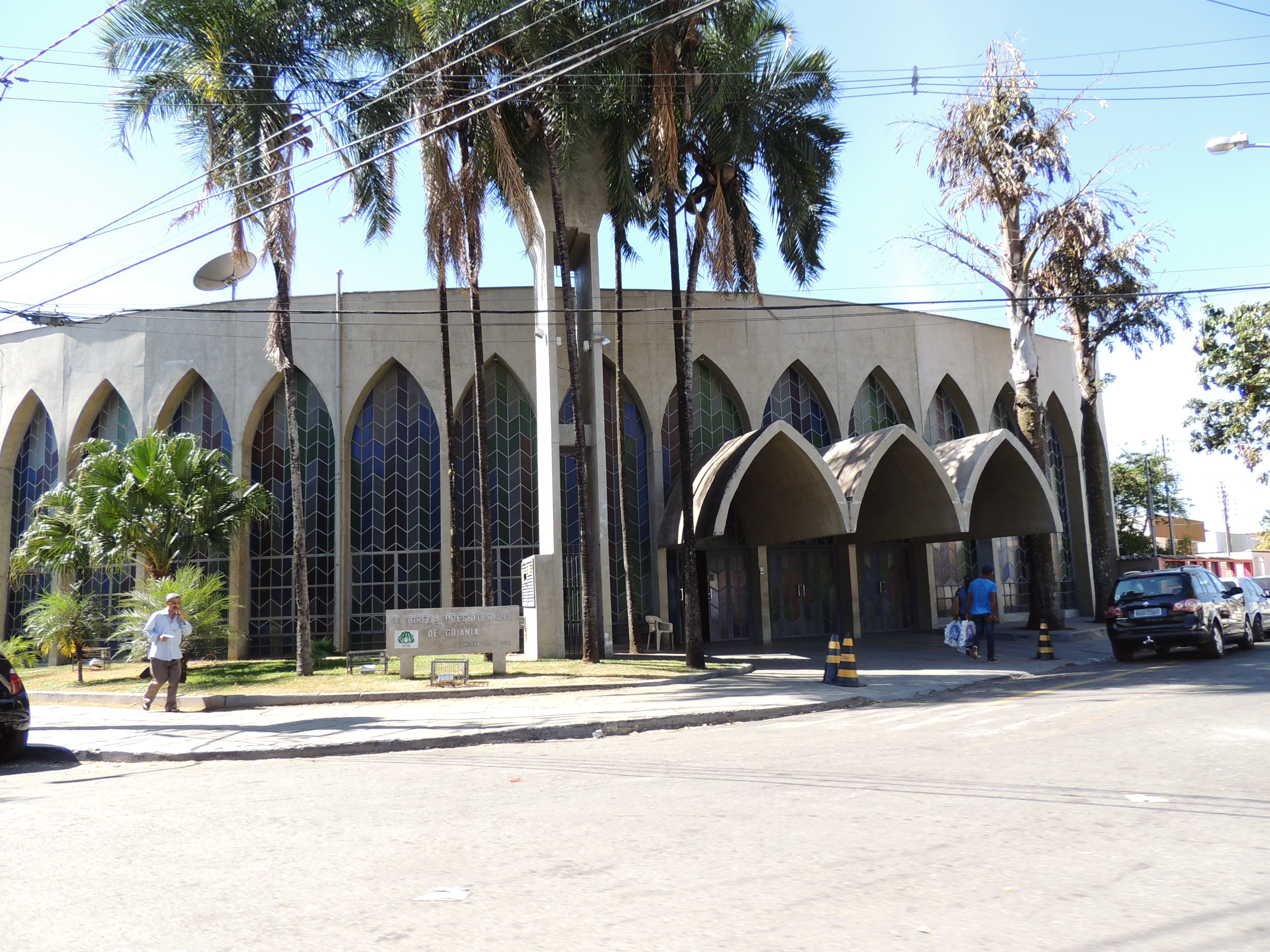
Presbyterian Church of Goiânia.

The population of the municipality in 2011, according to the IBGE, was 1,302,001 inhabitants, being the most populous municipality in the state and 12th in Brazil. The main reason for the large population in the vicinity of Goiânia and Brasília — that spurred the growth of the city and the region between it and the federal capital — making the axis Brasília-Goiânia's third largest agglomeration in the country, bringing together about nine million people. The metropolitan area of Goiânia is the tenth largest agglomeration urban Brazil, with a population of 2,173,141, presents a population density of 782.5 inhabitants per 1 square kilometre (0.4 sq mi), the largest of its state.

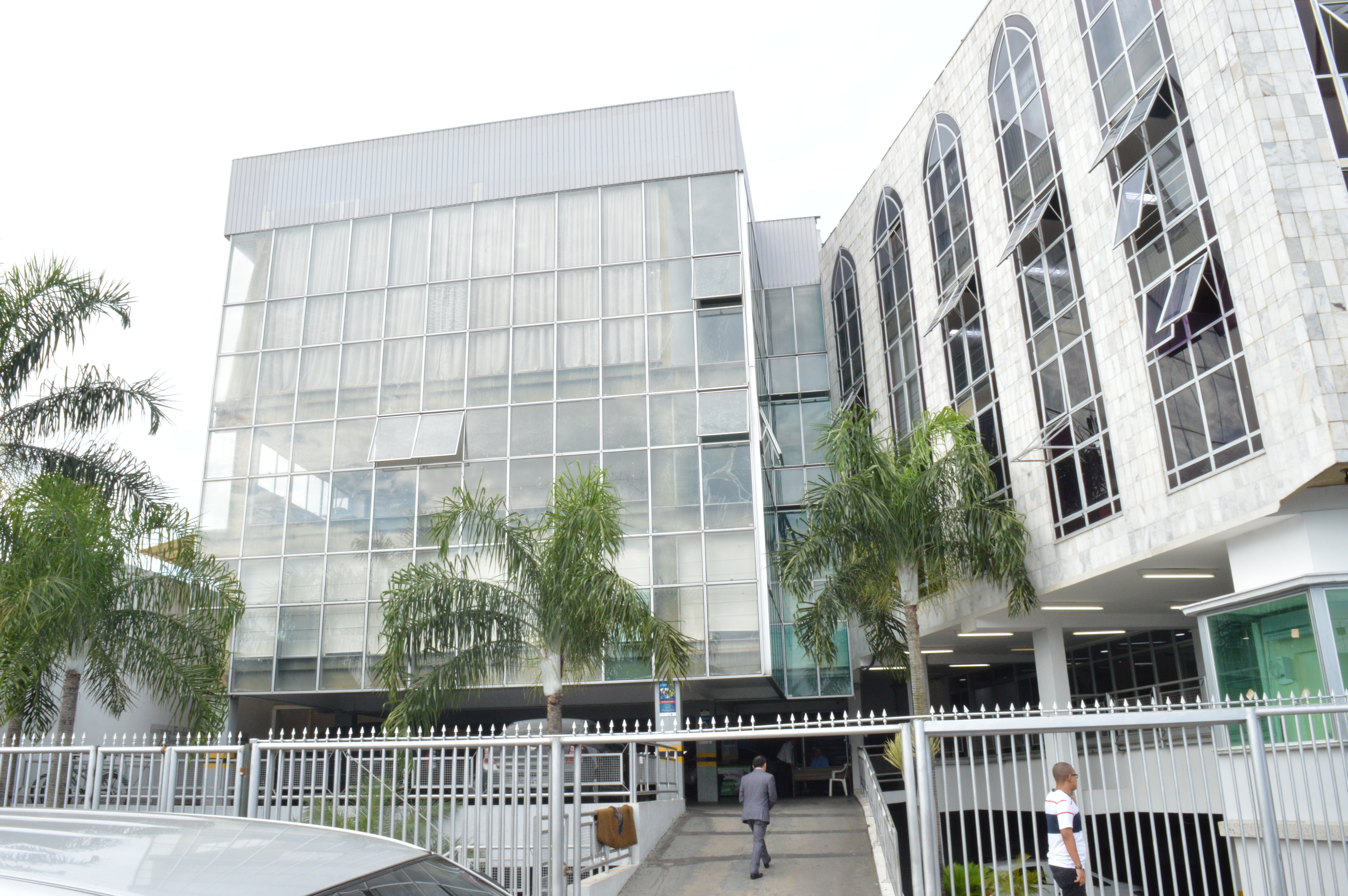
Temple of Assemblies of God in Goiânia.

The Human Development Index Municipal (HDI) of Goiânia is considered high by the United Nations Development Programme (UNDP), at 0.832, the second largest of any state of Goiás (in 242 municipalities); third of all Midwest Region of Brazil (in 446) and 111 from all over Brazil (in 5507). Considering only the education, the index value is 0.933 (classified as very high), while Brazil's is 0.849. The longevity index is 0.751 (0.638 is Brazilian) and income is 0.813 (that of Brazil is 0.723). The city has most of the indicators high and similar to the national average according to UNDP. The literacy rate is 96.78% of adults. The incidence of poverty, measured by the IBGE, is 3.64%; the lower the incidence of poverty is 2.92%; the top is 4.35%; and subjective poverty incidence is 4.35%.

=== Social inequality ===
Among Brazil's metropolises, Goiânia has the lowest number of "favelas" (Portuguese for slums) according to data extracted from the 2010 census by the Brazilian Institute of Geography and Statistics, the IBGE. The IBGE named seven areas in Goiânia as being "subnormal agglomerations", a government term for irregular housing. In these locales, however, most of the households do have electricity, water, and trash collection.

While perhaps not fitting the criteria of favelas, Goiânia has several sectors, particularly on the outskirts, that are low income.

=== Ethnicity and immigration ===
Goiânia is a multiracial city as the result of intense migration. The populace has intimate connection with the settlement of the interior of the Brazilian center-west, gradually attracted mainly by migrants from the interior of Goiás and other regions in other states of Brazil. According to a survey in 2010, most migrants are from Minas Gerais, Bahia, Tocantins, Maranhão, São Paulo and Pará. According to the census of the IBGE 2022, in search of self-declaration, the population of Goiânia is composed of Multiracial (48.0%), White (43.6%), Black (7.9%), Asian (0.3%) and Amerindian (0.1%).

Initially, Goiânia was populated by migrants from the interior of Goiás. Its creation was crucial to the population growth in the state, since Vila Boa, the ancient capital showed signs of declining population, is considered a setback for the state. The founding of Goiânia is now considered a successful settlement of the Brazilian interior. Today, the population coming from Goiânia is predominantly Minas Gerais, Bahia, Tocantins, Maranhão, São Paulo and Pará, respectively.

=== Religion ===
Like the cultural variety verifiable in Goiânia, there are religious manifestations present in the city. According to the IBGE (Brazilian Institute of Geography and Statistics), the population of Goiânia is composed mostly of Catholics (50.8%), evangelicals (32.4%), and spiritists (4.2%). Approximately 10% of the population has no religion. It is also home to a number of practitioners of other religions (2.3%).

== Education ==
Notable institutes include:

- Universidade Federal de Goiás (UFG)
- Pontifícia Universidade Católica de Goiás (PUC-GO)
- Universidade Estadual de Goiás (UEG)
- Instituto Federal de Educação, Ciência e Tecnologia de Goiás (IFG)
- Faculdade Unida de Campinas (FacUnicamps)

== Infrastructure ==
=== Transportation ===
==== Road ====
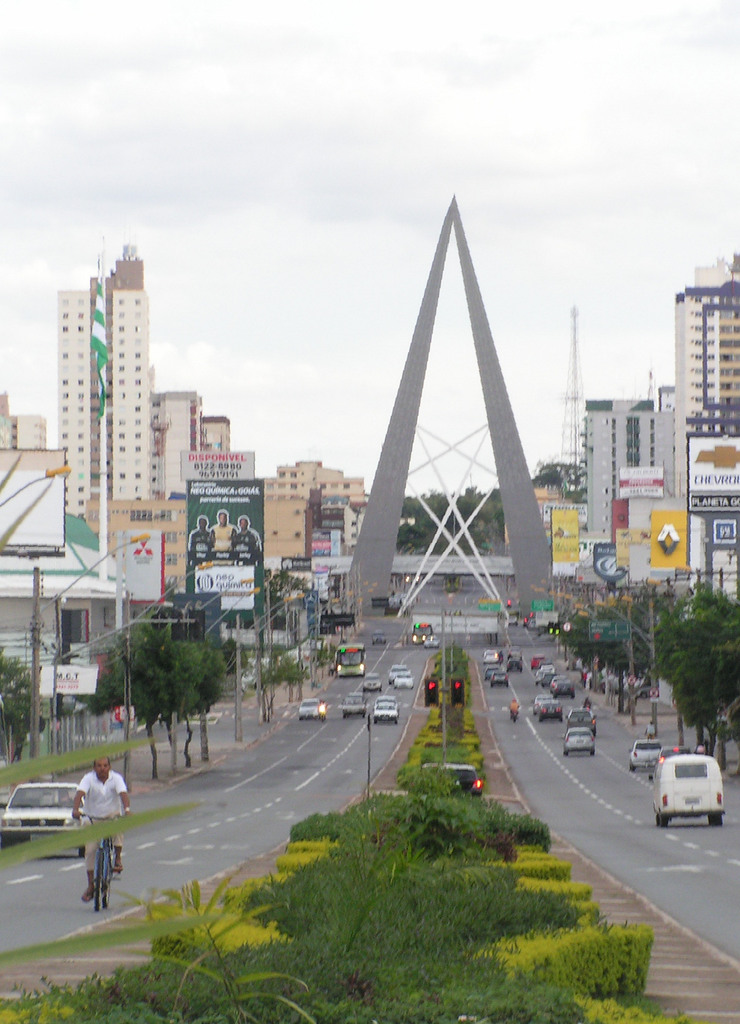
85 Avenue.

Goiânia is connected to the federal capital, Brasília, via a four-lane tolled highway (BR-060) and to São Paulo via another four-lane tolled highway (BR-153). The state of Goiás maintains the main artery roads (marked GO-xxx) in and out of the capital: four-lane roads GO-403, GO–020, GO–080, GO–070, and GO–060.

As Goiânia was a planned city, the downtown cores (Setores Central/Oeste/Sul) are relatively easy to navigate. Along the years, the planned urban development was replaced by the typical Brazilian way of urban growth, i.e., pure laissez-faire. Social and urban demands were neglected.

Due to this lack of planning and reliable public transportation, Goiânia is the metropolis with the highest number of cars per capita in the country; there are 1,000,000 registered motor vehicles in the city. The many vehicles on the roads cause major congestion during peak times.

==== Rail ====
The Railway line was closed in the 1970s, though the art deco station remains open to the public. Nowadays transportation of goods is carried out via the connecting highways.

==== Public transportation ====
All public transportation is via bus. Bus service in Goiânia is provided by several transportation companies working under the municipality.

There is a bus system map the can be found on the RMTC site. Buses run on a predictable time schedule. Goiânia is the only city of South America that has the ITS technology of bus transport, but the buses are usually full. Unlike most Brazilian cities, there are no ticket collectors on the buses in Goiânia; all the fares are collected using magnetic paper cards and turnstiles. Passes are provided by SitPASS and can be purchased from street vendors or in small shops throughout the city.

Anhanguera Avenue is one of the largest/longest avenues in the city. It underwent major work in the late 1990s that created a dedicated bus lane for its entire length, with stations every 0.5 kilometer. The bus lanes are in the center of the avenue, giving it a distinct look. The fare to travel on the Anhanguera bus route is half of normal fare, and all buses on this route are articulated buses.

===== The new contract =====
Under the new contract, firmed in 2009, many aspects of the public transportation are being changed:

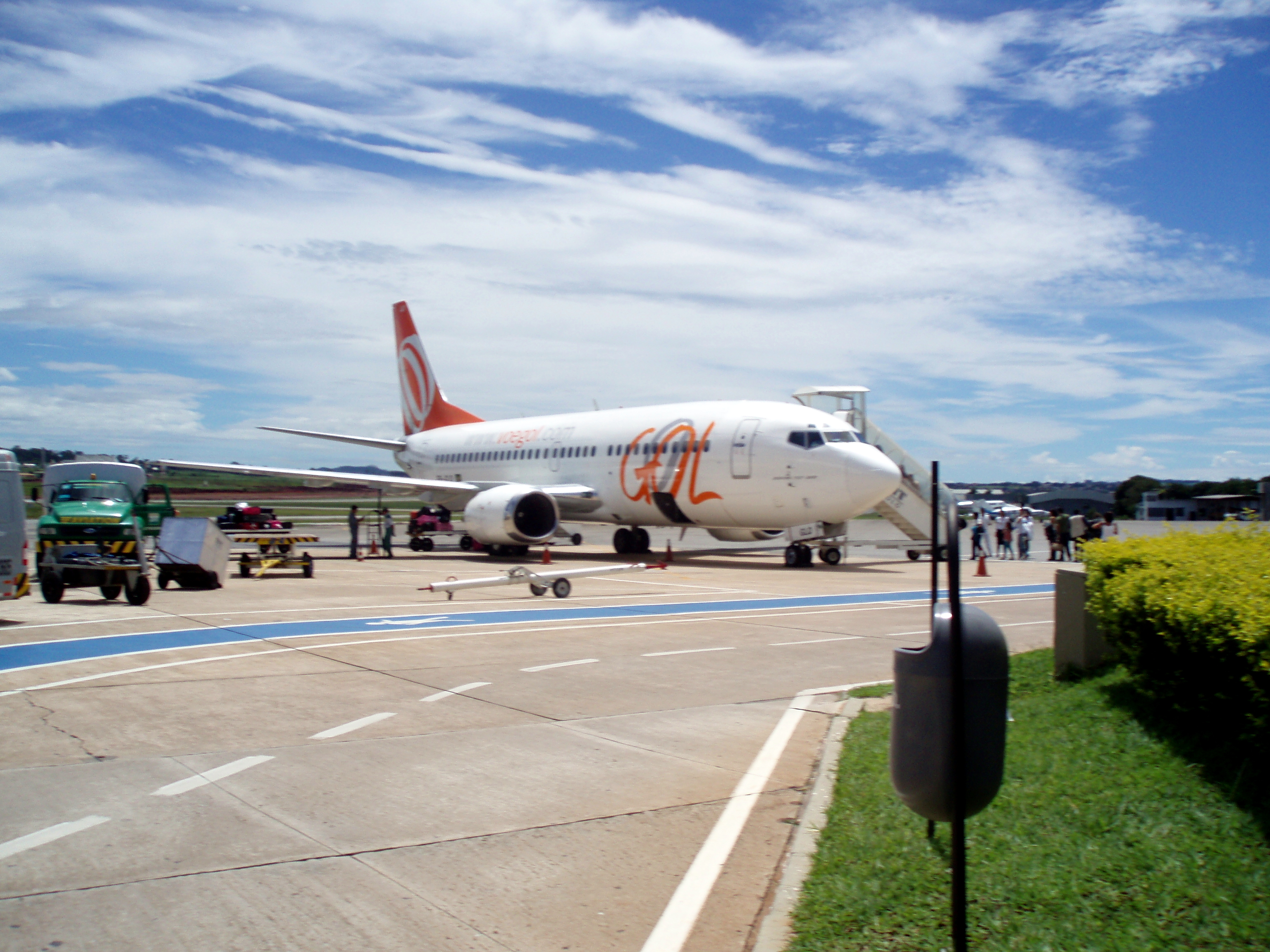
Gol Airlines at Santa Genoveva Airport.

- The terminal stations are now placed under administration of the companies that are refurbishing them;
- The buses are being equipped with GPS modules to solve the schedule problem and many other benefits, adapted to give accessibility to disabled people, radios to give fast response on reroutes and other events, and other minor changes;
- The introduction of the CityBus, a service of microbuses focused on giving a choice to people of higher wealth to use the public transit system instead of their cars and to tourists who are visiting the city.
- Changes on "Eixo Anhanguera" (Anhanguera axis) and its terminals. It is unclear what changes that will be made, but one of the main issues under discussion is the much criticized change in fares; in future, a person that gets on a terminal from the axis to integrate with an inter-municipal metropolitan line will have to pay a complete fare.
- A North-South axis is part of the project, but as of August/09 it has not been implemented yet
- An Operational Control Center that will monitor the bus traffic through GPS.
- A free number for users to call to know how much time is left before the next bus arrives is another part of project that has not yet been implemented.

=== Airports ===
Santa Genoveva Airport is on the northeast side Goiânia. Six airlines fly out of this airport to destinations in Brazil. The new Santa Genoveva International Airport started operating in May, 2016. In total, the new airport has 34,100 m^{2}, 4 gates, 23 check-in counters, 11 elevators, 4 escalators, 3 baggage carousels and 3 inspection lines with X-ray and metal detectors. According to Infraero, with this structure, the new airport can receive up to 6,5 million passengers a year.

Aeródromo Nacional de Aviação handles general aviation operations.

=== Security ===
Goiânia is considered a safe city compared to most state capitals within Brazil. The average murder rate per year is under 450 persons per year according to the Goiás State Police. It was, however, found in a study in 2011 performed by a Mexican think tank — the Citizens' Council for Public Security and Criminal Justice — that Goiânia ranks as the 40th most dangerous city in the world.

The city is patrolled and under the watch of the Goias Military Police, which is responsible for responding to crime and maintaining check points in the city and state. The Military Police are normally dressed in light tan military uniforms while patrolling. The prosecution and investigations of crime and all administration issues are handled by the Civil police (Policia Civil).

Within Goiânia traffic rules are enforced by the "AMT", whose members are traffic wardens with some minor police powers. This unit falls under the ownership of the city. Their responsibilities are to ensure road rules are enforced and attend to all accidents on the city streets.

== Green areas ==
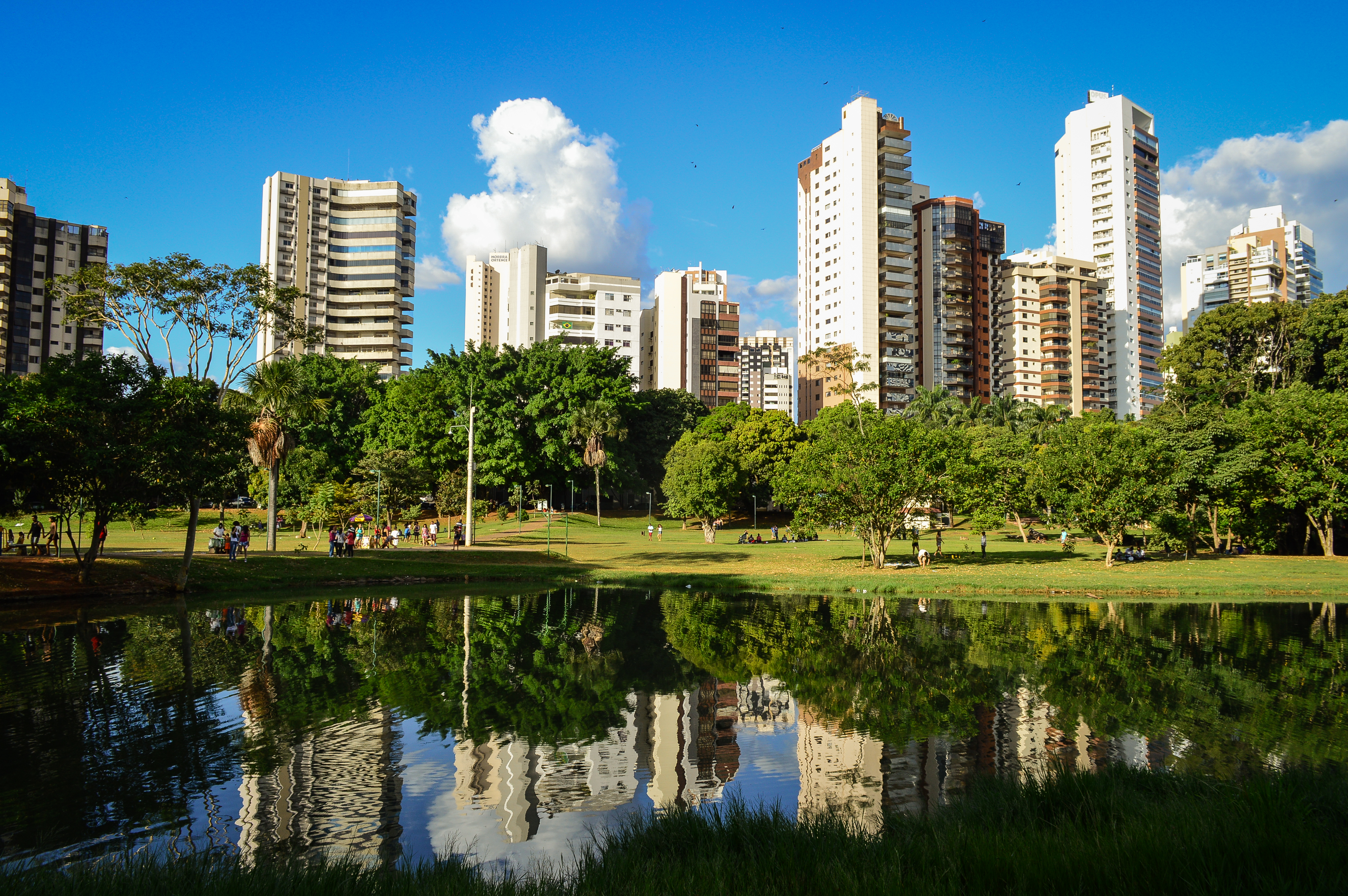
Green area in the Lago das Rosas Park.

Goiânia is home to a large number of skyscrapers dominating the center and one-floor family homes spreading out across the verdant tree-covered plain. Many of the streets are lined with tropical fruit trees, and there are many parks with remnants of the original tropical vegetation. Thirty percent of the city area is planted in trees — 3.75 square kilometres (1.45 sq mi) of the 11 square kilometres (4.25 sq mi).

The most important of these parks are the Parque Zoológico, Parque Vaca Brava, Parque Ecológico, Bosque dos Buritis and Parque Areião. One of the biggest parks is the Bosque dos Buritís with an area of 140,000 square m and containing many buriti palm trees, which have a yellow fruit. Parque Areião is home to monkeys native to the area. Almost all of the parks are surrounded by walking paths.

Goiânia is known for being the ‘spring capital’ and was planned as a modern city, growing outside from the center. In the starting years this building plan worked well, but through the quick growth the plan was not followed to the letter, with the exception of the green areas, causing severe infrastructure problems in some areas, in particular with the public transport and healthcare systems.

In the Bosque dos Buritis is the Monument for World Peace, designed by Siron Franco. Another attraction is the Chico Mendes Botanic Garden, housing trees and flowers like bromelias, orchids, fruit trees and a lake.

The municipality contains part of the 2,132 hectares (5,270 acres) Altamiro de Moura Pacheco State Park, created in 1992.

=== Parque Zoológico ===
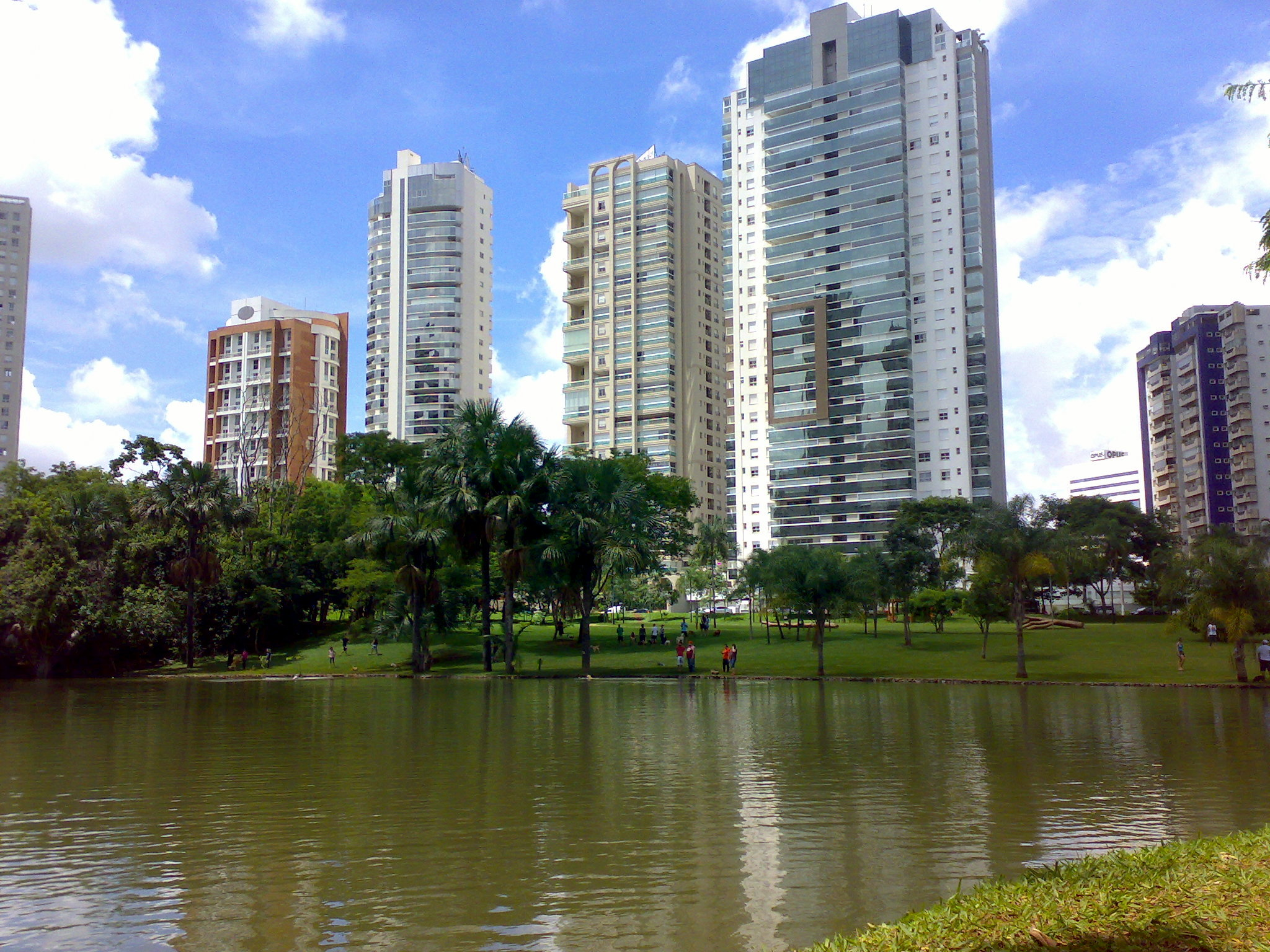
View of Flamboyant Park.

Created in 1946, the zoo contains over 1,000 animals, including mammals, birds, and reptiles. Five streams have their source in the park, which, besides the zoo, contains the Horto Florestal and the Lago das Rosas (Lake of Roses). The park is in the Setor Oeste, one of the richest residential areas of Goiânia.

=== Buriti Park ===
In the center of the city this is Goiânia's oldest green area. It has an area of 120,000 square metres (1,300,000 square feet). There is a running track and exercise area, that has pull-up bars and sit-up benches with various inclines. There are three artificial lakes created by Buriti Stream. It is home to the Goiânia Art Museum and the Free Center of Arts. It houses a group of marmosets and many turtles.

=== Vaca Brava Park ===
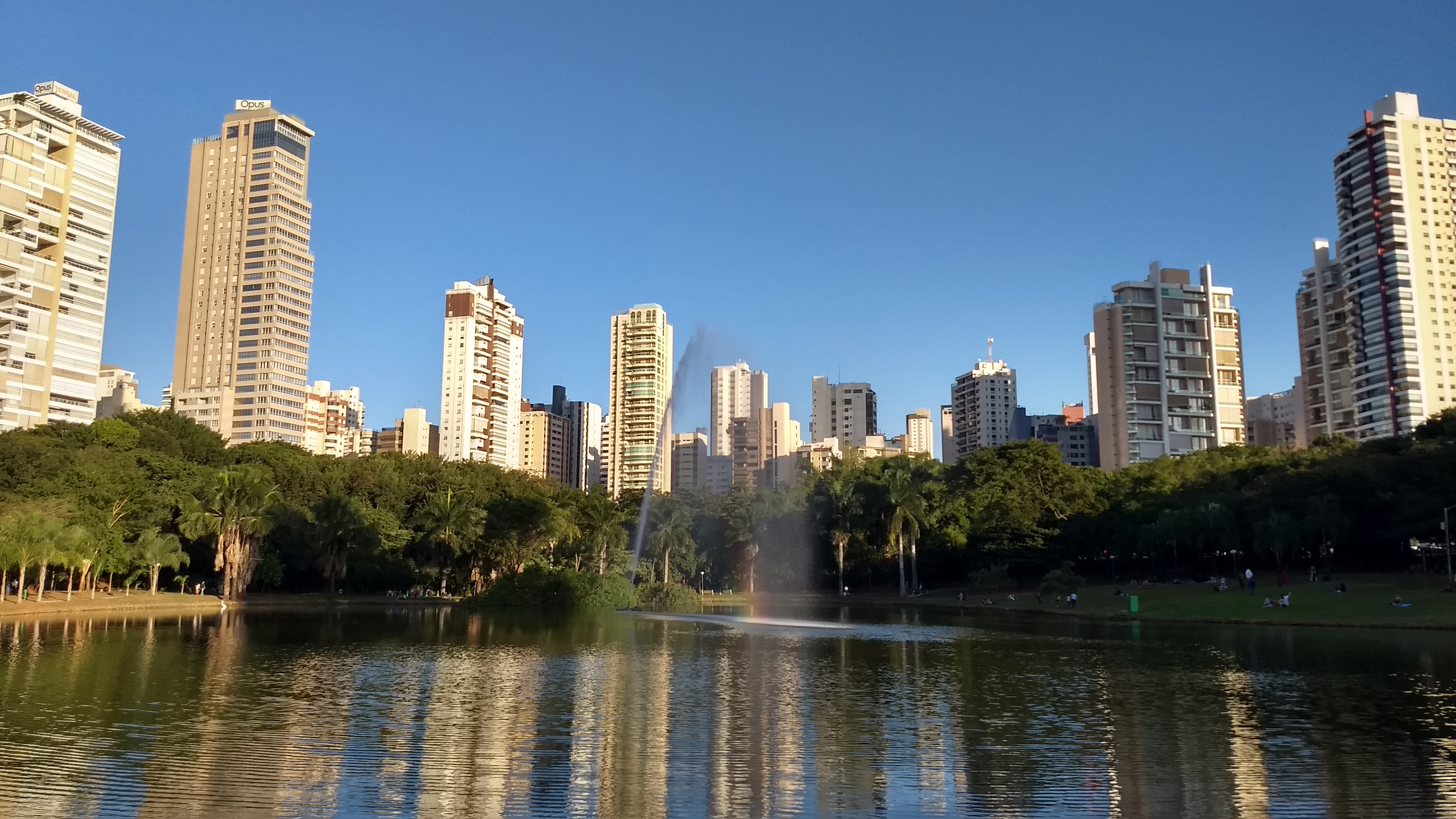
Goiânia seen from Vaca Brava Park.

Vaca Brava Park, renamed Parque Sulivan Silvestre after Dr. Sulivan Silvestre de Oliveira. Every day at dawn hundreds of people begin their daily activities by walking or jogging along the sidewalk that encloses Parque Vaca Brava. It has an area of 18,000 square metres (190,000 square feet) and contains a lake, a forest with native species and places for exercise.

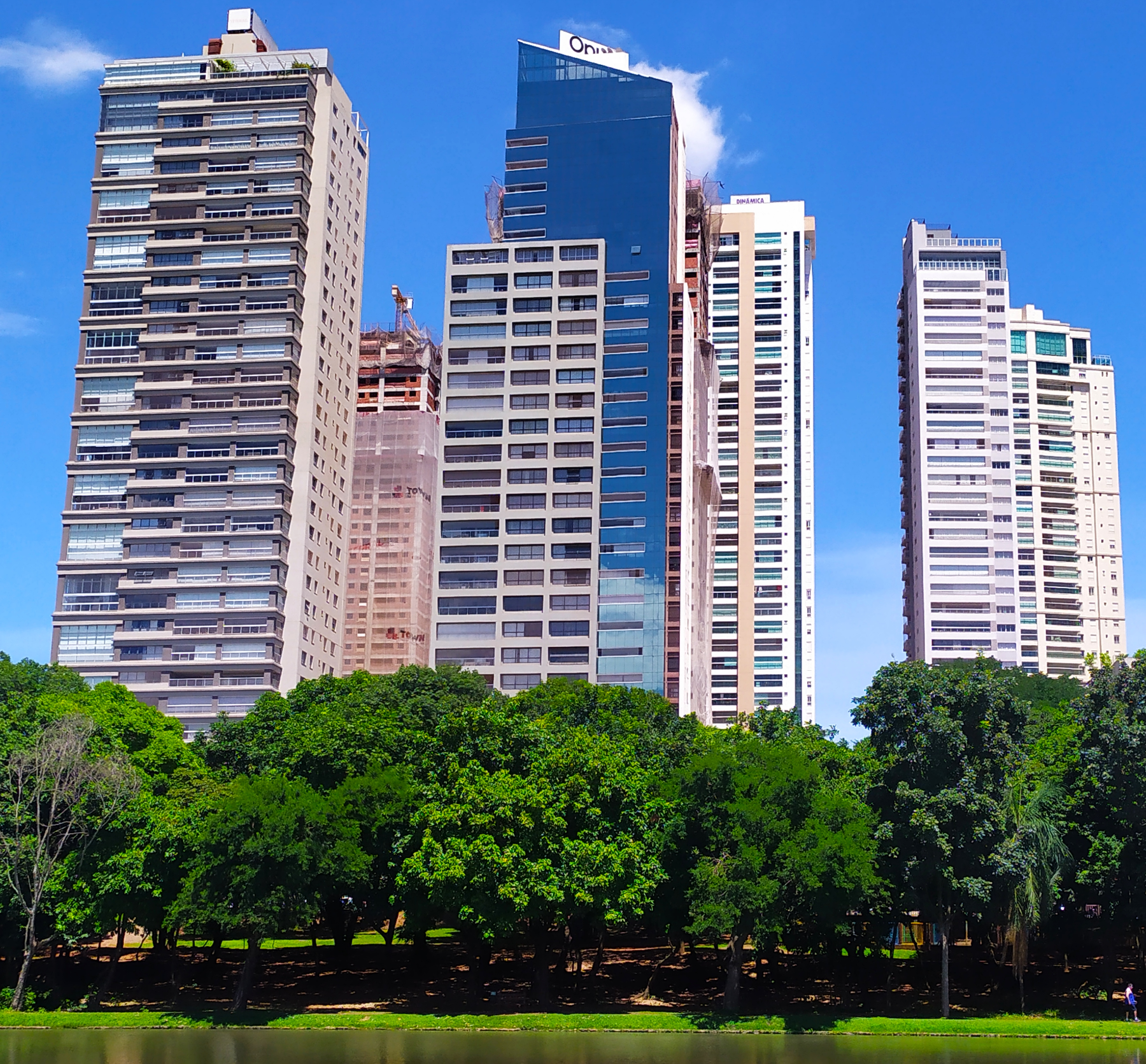
Areião Park.

Vaca Brava (which could be roughly translated as Angry Cow) has become a symbol of the new thriving area of the Setor Bueno, which has flourished in recent decades and is now one of the most important zones of Goiânia.

=== Areião Park ===
The Areião is one of the largest green areas of Goiânia. In a wealthy area, it is known for its dense vegetation, where monkeys are spotted very often. Besides the many trails, there is a lake, a jogging route and many wooden buildings, including a small theater, consisting of a stage and many seats in the middle of a bamboo forest.

=== Cobra Veiga center for snake research ===
Located in an area of 44,000.5 m^{2} (10.8728 acres), it has an infrastructure for 750 serpents of different species, in addition to a laboratory and a rodent house. Its main activities are the extraction of poison for medicinal purposes, research on behavior of serpents in captivity and the recuperation of degraded areas and the preservation of springs and their forest.

== Leisure ==
Goiânia has several leisure options. Shopping districts, malls, and parks make up part of the attractions visited by tourists every year.

=== Sports ===
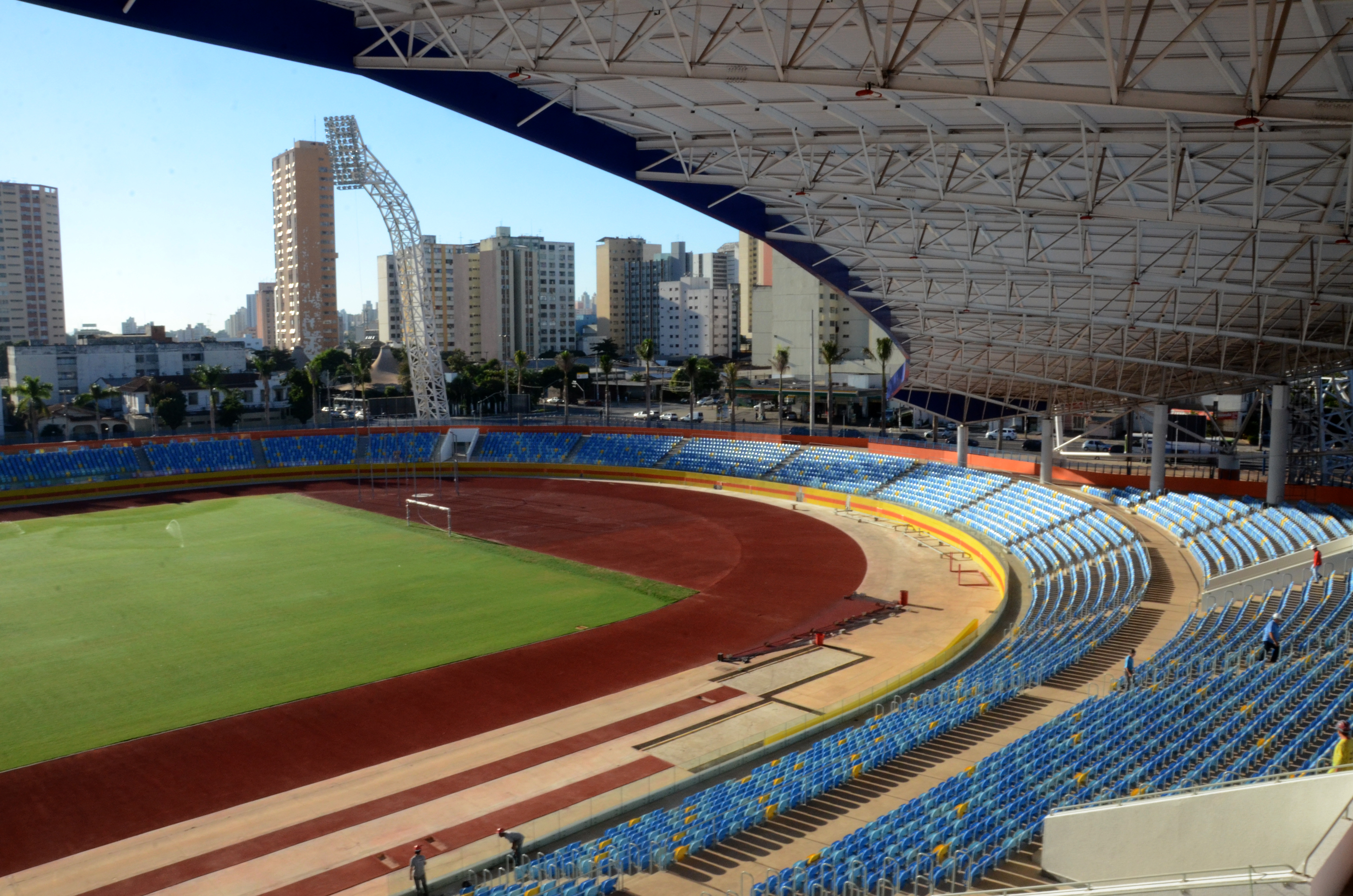
Pedro Ludovico Stadium.

Goiânia has five association football clubs: Goiás Esporte Clube, Atlético Clube Goianiense, Vila Nova Futebol Clube, Goiânia Esporte Clube, Monte Cristo Esporte Clube. Goiás compete in the Série A, while Atlético Goianiense compete in the Série B, and Vila Nova in the Série B.

Goiânia has two main sport stadiums that are used by the teams. Both stadiums are property of the State of Goias. The biggest one is the Serra Dourada Stadium. The stadium has the capacity of 50,049 spectators and it is used especially by Goiás Esporte Clube and Vila Nova Futebol Clube. Other important stadium in Goiânia is the Pedro Ludovico Teixeira Stadium, also known as Olímpico Stadium. The current capacity is 12,055 spectators and it is most used by Atlético Clube Goianiense.

The Autódromo Internacional Ayrton Senna has hosted the Brazilian motorcycle Grand Prix, Formula 3 Sudamericana and TCR South America Touring Car Championship, as well as national motorsport series such as the Stock Car Pro Series, Fórmula Truck, Copa Truck, Moto 1000 GP, Império Endurance Brasil, Campeonato Sudamericano de GT and NASCAR Brasil Series.

The Hipódromo da Lagoinha is a horse racetrack that opened in 1958. The city also has numerous gyms, public and private.

=== Museums ===
The most important museums are the Museu Antropológico da Universidade Federal de Goiás, Instituto Goiano de Pré-História e Antropologia, Fundação Museu de Ornitologia, Museu de Arte Contemporânea and Museu Zoroastro Artiaga. One interesting place is the so-called Memorial do Cerrado.

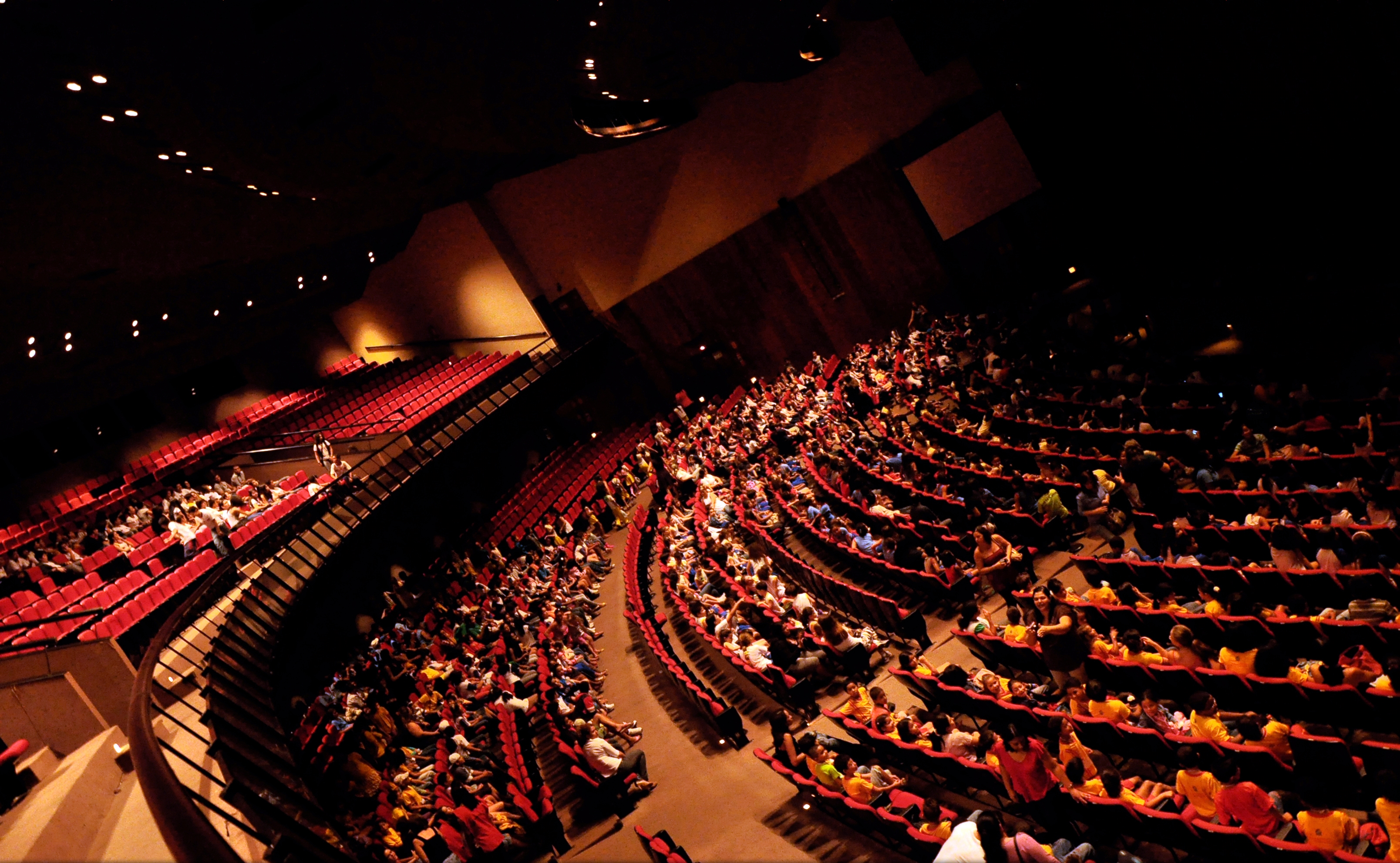
Rio Vermelho Theatre.

=== Music ===
With several double success, Goiás itself is the cradle of the sertanejo (country music) genre. Two types of sertanejo predominate: modao is identified as the old sertanejo music and sertanejo universitário as the new sertanejo music.

Goiânia, as the capital of a state that was rural until the 1980s, has been traditionally influenced by the sertanejo style, strongly connected with the countryside lifestyle. Though the sertanejo is still an icon of Goiás' culture, the rock scene is seen by some as a response to it and as the creator center of a Goianiense legitimately culture, independent of the countryside culture.

== Health ==
The primary health service in Goiânia is Unimed. Goiânia is a national reference in several areas of medicine, especially ophthalmology, neurology, burn treatment, and leprosy.

=== Health data ===
- Infant mortality rate: 21.30 in 1,000 live births (2000)
- Hospitals: 60
- Hospital beds: 6.037
- Walk-in public health clinics: 667
- Doctors in the public health system: 6,315 (2002)
- Nurses in the public health system: 808
- Dentists in the public health system: 659

== International relations ==
=== Twin towns – Sister cities ===
Goiânia is twinned with:

Barquisimeto, Lara, Venezuela; Belém, Pará, Brazil; Grotte di Castro, Viterbo, Italy; Guadalajara, Jalisco, Mexico	Manaus, Amazonas, Brazil; San Jose, Costa Rica; Uberlândia, Minas Gerais, Brazil; Idar-Oberstein, Rhineland-Palatinate, Germany; Chittagong, Chittagong Division, Bangladesh

Goiânia was formerly twinned with:

- Madison, Wisconsin, United States

== Notable people ==
- Túlio Maravilha, football player
- Arthur, football player
- Dudu, football player
- Carlos Jayme, swimmer, Olympic medallist
- Diogo Villarinho, swimmer specialized in open water marathon
- César Sebba, basketball player, World Championship medalist
- Jaime Camara, racing driver
- Léo Jaime, singer
- Wanessa Camargo, singer
- Carolina Ferraz, actress
- Ingrid Guimarães, actress
- Tiago Henrique Gomes da Rocha, criminal
- Fernandão, football player, world champion playing for Sport Club Internacional
- Lisalla Montenegro, model
- Gustavo Gayer, politician
- Jessie Rogers, pornographic actress
- Stanisław Szmajzner, Polish-born Holocaust survivor and World War II partisan
- Alok, DJ

== See also ==
- List of municipalities in Goiás
