= List of rivers of the Federal District (Brazil) =

List of rivers in the Federal District of Brazil.

The list is arranged by drainage basin, with respective tributaries indented under each larger stream's name and ordered from downstream to upstream.

== By Drainage Basin ==
=== Tocantins Basin ===
- Tocantins River (Tocantins, Goiás)
  - Maranhão River
    - Do Sal River
    - Das Palmas River
    - Das Salinas River

=== São Francisco Basin ===
- São Francisco River (Bahia, Minas Gerais)
  - Paracatu River (Minas Gerais)
    - Preto River
      - São Bernardo River
      - Jardim River

=== Paraná Basin ===
- Paraná River (Argentina, Paraná, Mato Grosso do Sul)
  - Paranaíba River (Goiás)
    - Corumbá River (Goiás)
      - São Bartolomeu River
        - Paranoá River
          - Lake Paranoá
        - Sobradinho Creek
        - Pipiripau River
      - Ponte Alta River
      - Descoberto River
        - Melchior River
        - Rodeador River
    - São Marcos River (Goiás)
      - Samambaia River

== Alphabetically ==
- Descoberto River
- Jardim River
- Maranhão River
- Melchior River
- Das Palmas River
- Paranoá River
- Pipiripau River
- Ponte Alta River
- Preto River
- Rodeador River
- Do Sal River
- Das Salinas River
- Samambaia River
- São Bartolomeu River
- São Bernardo River
- Sobradinho Creek
