= Rio Verde =

Rio Verde, Río Verde, or Rioverde (green river) may refer to:

== Municipalities ==
=== Brazil ===
- Rio Verde, Goiás
- Lucas do Rio Verde
- Conceição do Rio Verde
- Rio Verde de Mato Grosso

==== Ecuador ====
- Río Verde Canton
- Rioverde, Ecuador

=== Other places ===
- Río Verde Quila Quila Canton, Chayanta Municipality, Bolivia
- Río Verde Colony, a Mennonite colony in San Pedro Department, Paraguay
- Río Verde, Chile
- Rioverde, San Luis Potosí, Mexico
- Rio Verde, Arizona, United States

== Rivers ==
=== Brazil ===
- Rio Verde (Bahia)
- Rio Verde (Das Almas River tributary)
- Rio Verde (Das Bois River)
- Rio Verde (Grande River tributary)
- Rio Verde (Guaporé River tributary, Mato Grosso)
- Rio Verde (Guaporé River tributary, Rondônia)
- Rio Verde (Jamari River tributary)
- Rio Verde (lower Paranaíba River tributary)
- Rio Verde (Maranhão River tributary)
- Rio Verde (Mato Grosso do Sul)
- Rio Verde (Piquiri)
- Rio Verde (Sacre River tributary)
- Rio Verde (São Paulo)
- Rio Verde (Sapucaí)
- Rio Verde (Teles Pires tributary)
- Rio Verde (Tocantins)
- Rio Verde (upper Paranaíba River tributary)
- Rio Verde Grande
- Rio Verde Pequeno

=== Mexico ===
- Río Verde (Chihuahua)
- Río Verde (Jalisco)
- Río Verde (Oaxaca)
- Río Verde (San Luis Potosi)

=== Paraguay ===
- Río Verde (Paraguay)

=== Spain ===
- Río Verde (Málaga), a river in Málaga Province, Andalusia, whose source is in the Sierra de las Nieves

=== United States ===
- Verde River

== Other meanings ==
- Rio Verde Esporte Clube, a Brazilian football (soccer) club

== See also ==
- Rioverde (disambiguation)
