= Peixe River =

Peixe River or Do Peixe River or Rio do Peixe (peixe means fish in Portuguese) may refer to several rivers in Brazil:

== Bahia ==
- Peixe River (Itapicuru River tributary)
- Peixe River (Paraguaçu River tributary)

== Goiás ==
- Peixe River (Corumbá River tributary)
- Peixe River (Crixás Açu River tributary)
- Peixe River (Das Almas River tributary)
- Peixe River (lower Araguaia River tributary)
- Peixe River (upper Araguaia River tributary)

== Mato Grosso ==
- Dos Peixes River (Mato Grosso)

== Mato Grosso do Sul ==
- Do Peixe River (Mato Grosso do Sul)

== Minas Gerais ==
- Do Peixe River (Cabo Verde River tributary)
- Do Peixe River (Pará River tributary)
- Do Peixe River (Paraibuna River tributary)
- Rio do Peixe (Mojiguaçu River tributary)

== Paraíba ==
- Peixe River (Paraíba)

== Santa Catarina ==
- Do Peixe River (Santa Catarina)

== São Paulo ==
- Do Peixe River (Jaguari River tributary)
- Do Peixe River (Paraibuna River, São Paulo)
- Do Peixe River (Tietê River tributary)
- Rio do Peixe (Mojiguaçu River tributary)
- Rio do Peixe (Paraná River tributary)
  - Rio do Peixe State Park

== See also ==
- Peixe (disambiguation)
