= Crixás =

Crixás may refer to:

- Crixás, Brazil, a municipality in northwestern Goiás state, Brazil.
- Nova Crixás, a municipality in northeastern Goiás state, Brazil
- Crixás do Tocantins, a municipality in the Brazilian state of Tocantins
- Crixás River (disambiguation), several rivers in Brazil including
  - Crixás River (Goiás), a river of Goiás state in central Brazil
  - Crixás River (Tocantins), a river of Tocantins state in central Brazil
  - Crixás Açu River, a river of Goiás state in central Brazil
  - Crixás Mirim River, a river of Goiás state in central Brazil
