= Lamontichthys avacanoeiro =

Conservation status
- Endangered (IUCN 3.1)

Scientific classification
- Kingdom: Animalia
- Phylum: Chordata
- Class: Actinopterygii
- Order: Siluriformes
- Family: Loricariidae
- Genus: Lamontichthys
- Species: L. avacanoeiro

Binomial name
- Lamontichthys avacanoeiro de Carvalho Paixão & Toledo-Piza, 2009

Species of catfish

Lamontichthys avacanoeiro is a species of freshwater ray-finned fish belonging to the family Loricariidae, the suckermouth armored catfishes, and the subfamily Loricariinae, the mailed catfishes. This catfish is endemic to Brazil where it is found in the upper Tocantins River and some tributaries, in the Bagagem, Passa Três, das Almas, Tocantinzinho and Traíras rivers, in Goiás. This species reaches a maximum standard length of 16 cm (6.3 in)>

== Etymology ==
Lamontichthys avacanoeiro has the specific name, avacanoeiro, which refers to the Avá-canoeiros people, speakers of the Avá-Canoeiro language, who inhabit the upper Tocantins basin.
