= Claro =

Claro or CLARO may refer to:

== Companies ==
- Claro Company or Claro Americanas, a mobile and fixed voice and data communications company
  - Claro Argentina, Paraguay and Uruguay
  - Claro Brasil
  - Claro Colombia
  - Claro Ecuador
  - Claro El Salvador
  - Claro Guatemala
  - Claro Jamaica
  - Claro Puerto Rico
  - Claro (Dominican Republic)
- Claro fair trade, a sustainable company established by EvB and based in Switzerland
- Claro TV, a Latin American operator of Pay television

== Places ==
- Claro, Switzerland, a place in the canton of Ticino
- Claro Wapentake, the former district of Yorkshire

== Other uses ==
- Clarion (instrument), a medieval brass instrument also called Claro
- CLARO (political party), a political party in Orihuela, Spain
- Claro (restaurant), a Michelin-starred restaurant in Brooklyn, New York
- Claro (surname), a surname (includes a list)
- Claro TV, a Latin American pay television operator
- Claro, a light-colored cigar wrapper
- The wood of the Juglans hindsii, sometimes called claro walnut

== See also ==
- Claros, an ancient Greek sanctuary on the coast of Ionia, Greece
- Rio Claro (disambiguation)
- Clairo (born 1998), American lo-fi musician
