= Dos Bois River =

There are several rivers named Dos Bois River in Brazil:

- Dos Bois River (Crixás Açu River tributary)
- Dos Bois River (Das Almas River tributary)
- Dos Bois River (Paranaíba River)

== See also ==
- DOS BIOS
