= List of rivers of Goiás =

List of rivers in Goiás (Brazilian State).

The list is arranged by drainage basin, with respective tributaries indented under each larger stream's name and ordered from downstream to upstream. All rivers in Goiás drain to the Atlantic Ocean.

== By Drainage Basin ==
=== Tocantins/Araguaia Basin ===
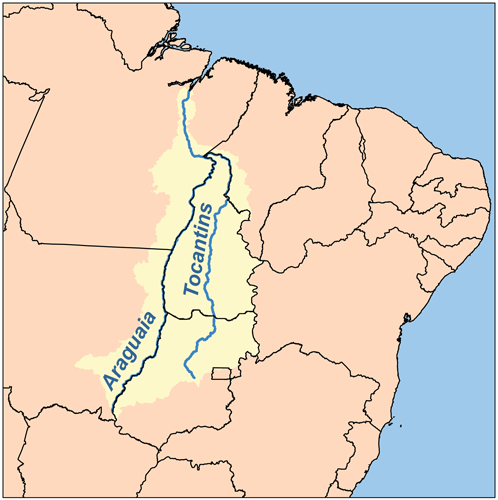
Map of the Araguaia/Tocantins basin

- Tocantins River
  - Araguaia River
    - Braço Menor do Rio Araguaia River
      - Formoso River (Tocantins)
        - Pau-Seco River
      - Verde River
        - Tiúba River
    - Crixás Açu River
      - Crixás Mirim River
      - Pintado River
      - Palmital River
      - Gregório River
      - Dos Bois River
      - Peixe River
    - Peixe River
      - Tesoura River
    - Palmeiras River
      - Vermelho River
    - Claro River
    - Caiapó River
      - Piranhas River
      - Bonito River
    - Peixe River
    - Diamantina River
      - Matrinxã River
    - Babilônia River
  - Paranã River
    - Palma River (Tocantins)
      - Mosquito River
    - Bezerra River (Montes Claros River)
    - Das Pedras River
    - São Domingos River
      - Manso River
    - São Bernardo River
    - Corrente River
      - Macambira River
      - Vermelho River
    - Cana Brava River
    - Crixás River
  - Santa Tereza River
    - Cana Brava River
    - Do Ouro River
  - Mocambo River
  - Cana Brava River
  - Preto River
    - Claro River
  - Tocantizinho River
  - Bagagem River
  - Traíras River
  - Maranhão River
    - Das Almas River
      - Dos Bois River
      - São Patrício River
      - Peixe River
      - Verde River
      - Uru River
    - Dos Patos River
    - Verde River
    - Do Sal River
    - Arraial Velho River
    - Das Palmas River
      - Das Salinas River

=== São Francisco Basin ===
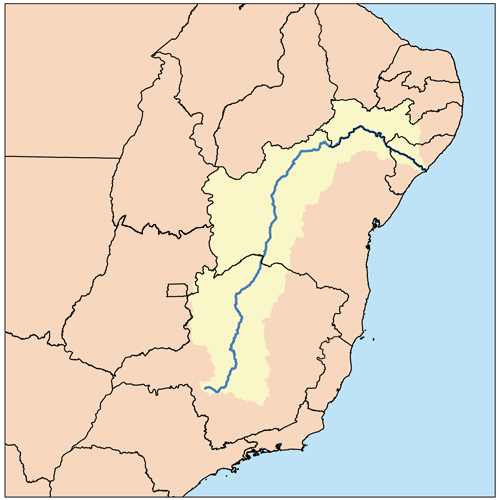
Map of the São Francisco basin

- São Francisco River (Bahia, Minas Gerais)
  - Paracatu River (Minas Gerais)
    - Preto River
      - Salabro River
      - São Bernardo River
      - Bezerra River

=== Paraná Basin ===
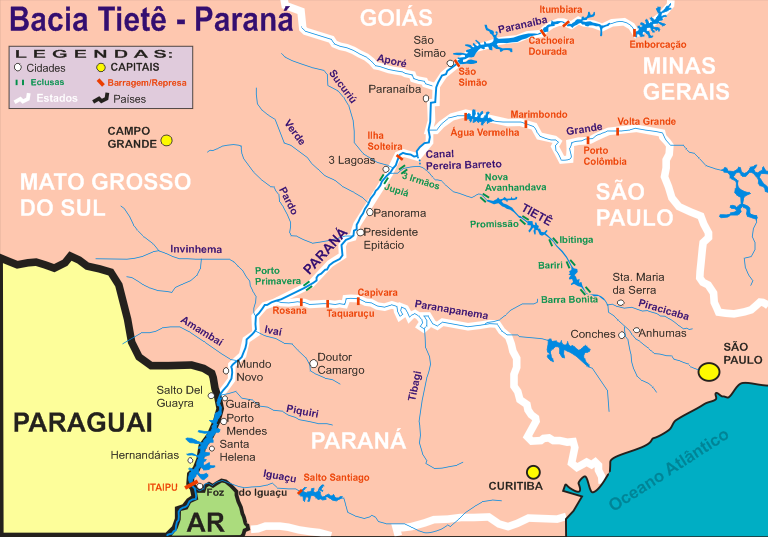
Map of the upper Paraná River and its tributaries

- Paraná River (Argentina, Paraná, Mato Grosso do Sul)
  - Paranaíba River
    - Aporé River
      - Da Prata River
    - Corrente River
      - Formoso River
      - Jacuba River
    - Verde River
    - Claro River
      - Doce River
    - Alegre River
    - Preto River
    - Dos Bois River
      - Verde River (Verdão River)
        - São Tomás River
        - Verdinho River
      - Turvo River
        - Capivara River
    - Meia Ponte River
      - Dourados River
      - Caldas River
      - João Leite River
    - Piracanjuba River
    - Corumbá River
      - Peixe River
      - Piracanjuba River
      - São Bartolomeu River
      - Ponte Alta River
      - Descoberto River
      - Areias River
      - Das Antas River
    - Veríssimo River
    - São Marcos River
      - São Bento River
      - Samambaia River
    - Verde River

== Alphabetically ==
- Alegre River
- Das Almas River
- Das Antas River
- Aporé River
- Araguaia River
- Areias River
- Arraial Velho River
- Babilônia River
- Bagagem River
- Bezerra River
- Bezerra River (Montes Claros River)
- Dos Bois River
- Dos Bois River
- Dos Bois River
- Bonito River
- Braço Menor do Rio Araguaia River
- Caiapó River
- Caldas River
- Cana Brava River
- Cana Brava River
- Cana Brava River
- Capivara River
- Claro River
- Claro River
- Claro River
- Corrente River
- Corrente River
- Corumbá River
- Crixás Açu River
- Crixás Mirim River
- Crixás River
- Descoberto River
- Diamantina River
- Doce River
- Dourados River
- Formoso River
- Palmeiras River
- Jacuba River
- João Leite River
- Macambira River
- Manso River
- Maranhão River
- Matrinxã River
- Meia Ponte River
- Mocambo River
- Mosquito River
- Do Ouro River
- Das Palmas River
- Palmeiras River
- Palmital River
- Paranã River
- Paranaíba River
- Dos Patos River
- Pau-Seco River
- Das Pedras River
- Peixe River
- Peixe River
- Peixe River
- Peixe River
- Peixe River
- Pintado River
- Piracanjuba River
- Piracanjuba River
- Piranhas River
- Da Prata River
- Preto River
- Preto River
- Preto River
- Ponte Alta River
- Do Sal River
- Salabro River
- Das Salinas River
- Samambaia River
- Santa Tereza River
- São Bartolomeu River
- São Bento River
- São Bernardo River
- São Bernardo River
- São Domingos River
- São Marcos River
- São Patrício River
- São Tomás River
- Tesoura River
- Tiúba River
- Tocantins River
- Tocantizinho River
- Traíras River
- Turvo River
- Uru River
- Verde River
- Verde River (Verdão River)
- Verde River
- Verde River
- Verde River
- Verde River
- Verdinho River
- Veríssimo River
- Vermelho River
- Vermelho River
