= Microlepidogaster longicolla =

Conservation status
- Least Concern (IUCN 3.1)

Scientific classification
- Kingdom: Animalia
- Phylum: Chordata
- Class: Actinopterygii
- Order: Siluriformes
- Family: Loricariidae
- Genus: Microlepidogaster
- Species: M. longicolla

Binomial name
- Microlepidogaster longicolla Calegari & R. E. dos Reis, 2010

Species of armored catfish

Microlepidogaster longicolla is a species of freshwater ray-finned fish belonging to the family Loricariidae, the suckermouth armored catfishes, and the subfamily Hypoptopomatinae. the cascudinhos. This catfish is endemic to the upper reaches of the São Bartolomeu, a tributary to the Corumbá, itself a tributary to the Paranaíba in the upper Paraná basin in the states of Goiás and Minas Gerais, and the Federal District. This species reaches a standard length of 4.6 cm (1.8 in).
