= Piracanjuba River =

Piracanjuba River may refer to:

- Piracanjuba River (Corumbá River), a river in Brazil
- Piracanjuba River (Paranaíba River), a river in Brazil
