= São Bernardo River =

São Bernardo River may refer to the following rivers in Brazil:

- São Bernardo River (Federal District)
- São Bernardo River (Goiás)
