= Paranoá River =

Coordinates: 15.8094°S 47.7017°W

Location
- Country: Brazil

Physical characteristics
- Source
  - location: Federal District

The Paranoá River is a river in the Federal District, Brazil. It flows into São Bartolomeu River which then joins the larger Corumbá River.

== See also ==
- List of rivers in the Federal District
