= Crixás River =

Crixás River may refer to several rivers in Brazil:

- Crixás River (Goiás), a river of Goiás state in central Brazil
- Crixás River (Tocantins), a river of Tocantins state in central Brazil
- Crixás Açu River, a river of Goiás state in central Brazil
- Crixás Mirim River, a river of Goiás state in central Brazil
