= Corumbá Lake =

Reservoir in Goiás State, Brazil

Lago de Corumbá
- Location within Brazil
- Interactive map of Lago de Corumbá
- Location: Goiás State
- Coordinates: 17°59′21″S 48°31′54″W
- Type: reservoir
- Primary inflows: Corumbá River
- Primary outflows: Corumbá River
- Basin countries: Brazil
- Surface area: 65 km^{2} (25 sq mi)
- Max. depth: 90 m (300 ft)

Corumbá Lake (Lago de Corumbá I) is an artificial lake formed by the damming of the Corumbá River in southern Goiás State, Brazil. It is located 10 km from the city of Caldas Novas, famous for its hot springs. The lake, which began to fill in 1996, supplies the hydroelectric plant, Usina Hidrelétrica Corumbá I. It is fed by the Pirapitanga River, Peixe River, Piracanjuba River and São Bartolomé River.

The deepest part of Corumbá Lake is near the dam and reaches 90 metres. The perimeter of the lake is quite irregular; to walk around it one would need to travel more than 100 kilometres.

With an area of 65 km^{2}, it is a popular location for water sports.
