= Microlepidogaster arachas =

Conservation status
- Least Concern (IUCN 3.1)

Scientific classification
- Kingdom: Animalia
- Phylum: Chordata
- Class: Actinopterygii
- Order: Siluriformes
- Family: Loricariidae
- Genus: Microlepidogaster
- Species: M. arachas

Binomial name
- Microlepidogaster arachas Martins, Calegari & Langeani, 2013

Synonyms
- Rhinolekos arachas (Martins, Calegari & Langeani 2013)

Species of armored catfish

Microlepidogaster arachas is a species of freshwater ray-finned fish belonging to the family Loricariidae, the suckermouth armored catfishes, and the subfamily Hypoptopomatinae, the cascudinhos. This catfish is endemic to tributaries of the Araguari, Perdizes and Dourados rivers, all part of the Paranaíba drainage, in the upper Paraná basin in the Brazilian states of Goiás and Minas Gerais. This species reaches a standard length of 4.2 cm (1.7 in). The specific name refers to the Araxás people, an indigenous group who lived in the highlands of southeastern Minas Gerais up to the mid-18th century.
