= Rio Claro =

Rio Claro (Portuguese and Spanish for "clear river" or "clean river") may refer to:

== Cities and communes ==
- Rio Claro, Trinidad and Tobago, the largest town in southeastern Trinidad and Tobago
- Rio Claro, Rio de Janeiro, a Brazilian municipality in the state of Rio de Janeiro
- Rio Claro, São Paulo, a Brazilian municipality in the state of São Paulo
- Rio Claro, Costa Rica, a small Costa Rican city located in the province of Puntarenas in the southwestern region of the country, near the border with Panama
- Río Claro, a commune of the Talca Province, Maule Region, Chile

== Rivers ==
=== Bolivia ===
- Claro River (Bolivia)

=== Brazil ===
- Claro River (Apucaraninha River)
- Claro River (Araguaia River)
- Claro River (Iguazu River)
- Claro River (Ivaí River)
- Claro River (lower Tietê River)
- Claro River (Minas Gerais)
- Claro River (Paranaíba River)
- Claro River (Pardo River)
- Claro River (Preto River)
- Claro River (upper Tietê River)

=== Chile ===
- Claro River (Elqui) tributary of the Elqui River in the Coquimbo Region
- Claro River (Tinguiririca) a tributary of the Tinguiririca River in the O'Higgins Region
- Claro River (Teno) a tributary of the Teno River in the Maule Region
- Claro River (Maule) a tributary of the Maule River in the Maule Region
- Claro River (Laja) a tributary of the Laja River in the Bío-Bío Region

=== Costa Rica ===
- Claro River (Costa Rica), a river of Costa Rica

=== Trinidad and Tobago ===
- Claro River (Trinidad and Tobago)

== Sports ==
- Rio Claro Futebol Clube, a Brazilian football (soccer) club

== See also ==
- River Clare, Ireland
