= Cana Brava River =

There are several rivers named Cana Brava River in Brazil:

- Cana Brava River (Paranã River tributary)
- Cana Brava River (Santa Tereza River tributary)
- Cana Brava River (lower Tocantins River tributary)
- Cana Brava River (upper Tocantins River tributary)
