= Das Almas River =

There are several rivers named Das Almas River or Rio das Almas in Brazil:

- Das Almas River (Bahia)
- Das Almas River (Goiás)
- Das Almas River (Maranhão)
- Das Almas River (São Paulo)
- Das Almas River (Tocantins)

== See also ==
- Das Palmas River, Goiás, Brazil
