= Rioverde =

Rioverde may refer to the following places:

- Rioverde, Ecuador
- Rioverde, San Luis Potosí, Mexico

== See also ==
- Rio Verde (disambiguation)
