= Da Prata River (Goiás) =

Location
- Country: Brazil

Physical characteristics
- Source
  - location: Goiás state
- Mouth: Aporé River
  - coordinates: 18°51′S 52°11′W

The Da Prata River is a river of Goiás state in central Brazil.

== See also ==
- List of rivers of Goiás
