= João Leite River =

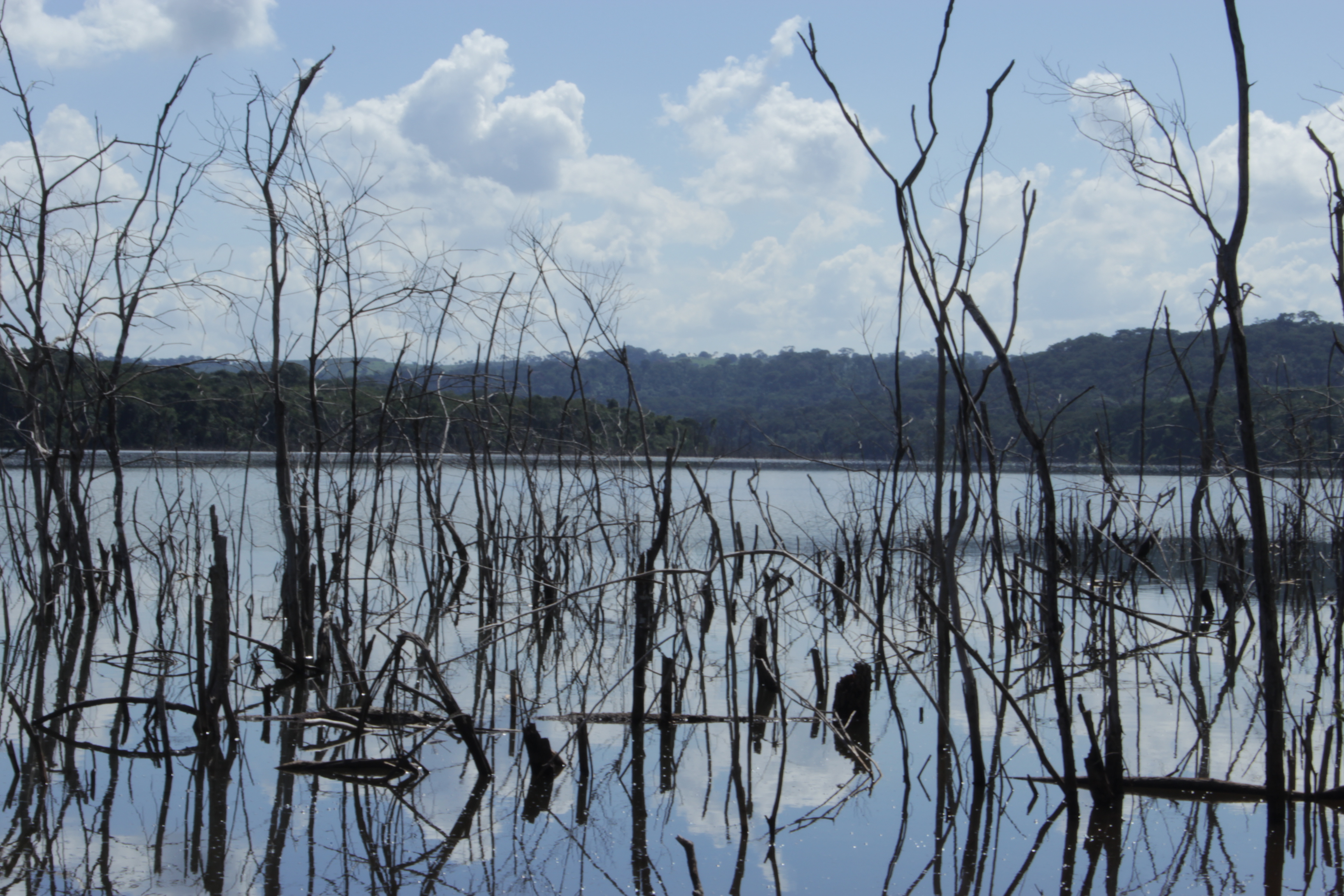
- Ribeirão João Leite Reservoir

- Location within Brazil
- Native name: Ribeirão João Leite (Portuguese)

Location
- Country: Brazil

Physical characteristics
- Source
  - location: Goiás state
- Mouth
  - coordinates: 16.644063°S 49.251763°W

The João Leite River (Portuguese: Ribeirão João Leite) is a river of Goiás state in central Brazil. It is a tributary of the Meia Ponte River.

== Reservoir ==
In May 1994 part of the Altamiro de Moura Pacheco State Park was removed to make way for the Ribeirão João Leite Reservoir, planned to supply water to the Metropolitan Region of Goiânia, the state capital. The park was reduced in size to 2,132 hectares (5,270 acres). The João Leite Reservoir provides water for over one million people. State law 18.462 of 9 May 2014 created the João Leite State Park with an area of 2,832 hectares (7,000 acres) from part of the area taken for the reservoir. The two parks now total 4,964 hectares (12,270 acres).

== Springs ==
In February 2015 the head of the state office for environmental crimes warned that 23 springs that feed the Ribeirão João Leite can no longer be recovered. The river has 491 springs in total, of which 70 are fully protected. Unless action was taken to protect the remaining springs, the reservoir would dry up in a few years. Farmers have been cooperating with efforts to recover the environment around the remaining springs.

== See also ==
- List of rivers of Goiás

== Sources ==
- Parque Estadual Altamiro de Moura Pacheco (in Portuguese), SECIMA, archived from the original on 2016-03-02
- Resende, Paula (10 February 2015), "Ribeirão João Leite tem 23 nascentes que já não podem ser recuperadas", G1 Globo (in Portuguese)
