= Verdinho River =

Location
- Country: Brazil

Physical characteristics
- Source
  - location: Goiás state
- Mouth: Rio Verdão
  - coordinates: 17°29′S 50°27′W

The Verdinho River is a river of Goiás state in central Brazil.

== See also ==
- List of rivers of Goiás
