= Bezerra River (Goiás) =

Location
- Country: Brazil

Physical characteristics
- Source
  - location: Goiás state
- Mouth: Preto River
  - coordinates: 16°1′S 47°13′W

The Bezerra River is a river of Goiás state in central Brazil.

== See also ==
- List of rivers of Goiás
