= Caldas River =

Location
- Country: Brazil

Physical characteristics
- Source
  - location: Goiás state
- Mouth: Meia Ponte River
  - coordinates: 16°54′S 49°6′W

The Caldas River is a river of Goiás state in central Brazil.

== See also ==
- List of rivers of Goiás
