= Manso River (Goiás) =

Location
- Country: Brazil

Physical characteristics
- Source
  - location: Goiás state
- Mouth
  - location: São Domingos River
  - coordinates: 13°29′S 46°46′W

The Manso River is a river of Goiás state in central Brazil.

== See also ==
- List of rivers of Goiás
