= Verissimo =

Verissimo may refer to:

- Veríssimo, a Brazilian municipality in the state of Minas Gerais
- Veríssimo River, a river in Brazil
- Verissimo (TV series), an Italian entertainment news program

== People with the surname ==
- Azumir Veríssimo, Brazilian football player
- Dany Verissimo, French actress and model
- Erico Verissimo, Brazilian author
- Fábio Jardel Veríssimo Lopes, Portuguese football player
- Joaquim Veríssimo Serrão, Portuguese historian
- José Veríssimo, Brazilian writer and educator
- Lucas Veríssimo, Brazilian football player
- Luis Fernando Verissimo, Brazilian author
- Nélson Veríssimo, Portuguese former football player
- Renato Verissimo, Brazilian martial artist
