= Uru River (Goiás) =

Location
- Country: Brazil

Physical characteristics
- Source
  - location: Goiás state
- Mouth: Das Almas River
  - coordinates: 15°24′S 49°36′W

The Uru River is a river of Goiás state in central Brazil.

== See also ==
- List of rivers of Goiás
