= Bonito River (Goiás) =

Location
- Country: Brazil

Physical characteristics
- Source
  - location: Goiás state
- Mouth
  - location: Caiapó River
  - coordinates: 16°28′S 51°23′W

The Bonito River is a river of Goiás state in central Brazil.

== See also ==
- List of rivers of Goiás
