= Capivara River (Goiás) =

Location
- Country: Brazil

Physical characteristics
- Source
  - location: Goiás state
- Mouth: Turvo River (Goiás)
  - coordinates: 17°20′S 50°9′W

The Capivara River is a river of Goiás state in central Brazil.

== See also ==
- List of rivers of Goiás
