= Areias River (Goiás) =

Location
- Country: Brazil

Physical characteristics
- Source
  - location: Goiás state
- Mouth: Corumbá River
  - coordinates: 16°20′S 48°20′W

Basin features
- River system: Paraná River

The Areias River is a river of Goiás state in central Brazil. Part of the Paraná River watershed, its source is located near the Serra dos Pirineus, and flows into the Corumbá River.

Its approximate length is sixty miles. It passes through the municipalities of Corumbá de Goiás, Cocalzinho, Águas Lindas, Santo Antônio do Descoberto and Alexânia.

The river was a major supplier of sand for the construction of Brasília, where extensive dredging and silting increasing the rapids, thus negatively interfering with his aquatic life.

== Fish ==
The main fish found in its waters are piau, pacu, piapara, tubarana, golden Timburi, minnows, piabanha, Pirapetinga, catfish etc.

The banks were composed by woods, and still has some well preserved vegetation, although many areas were turned into farms and pastures. Its main tributaries are the Macacos River, Posses River, Barreiro River, Antinhas River, Água Fria River, Ponte Alta and the São Tomé.

== See also ==
- List of rivers of Goiás
