= Gregório River =

There are two rivers in Brazil named Gregório River:

- Gregório River (Amazonas)
- Gregório River (Goiás)
