= Tesoura River =

Coordinates: 14°37′12″S 50°50′52″W

Location
- Country: Brazil

Physical characteristics
- Source
  - location: Goiás state
- Mouth
  - location: Peixe River

The Tesoura River is a river of Goiás state in central Brazil. The Tesoura River and all rivers of Goiás drain to the Atlantic Ocean.

== See also ==
- List of rivers of Goiás
