= Palmital River (Goiás) =

Location
- Country: Brazil

Physical characteristics
- Source
  - location: Goiás state
- Mouth
  - location: Crixás Açu River
  - coordinates: 13°39′S 50°14′W

The Palmital River is a river of Goiás state in central Brazil.

== See also ==
- List of rivers of Goiás
