= Dos Patos River (Goiás) =

Location
- Country: Brazil

Physical characteristics
- Source
  - location: Goiás state
- Mouth: Maranhão River
  - coordinates: 14°52′S 48°46′W

The Dos Patos River is a river of Goiás state in central Brazil.

== See also ==
- List of rivers of Goiás
