= San Bernard =

San Bernard may refer to:

- San Bernard River, Texas, United States
- San Bernard National Wildlife Refuge, Texas, a wildlife conservation area
- Texan schooner San Bernard, a ship of the Second Texas Navy

== See also ==
- Saint Bernard (disambiguation)
- San Bernardo (disambiguation)
- São Bernardo (disambiguation)
