= Doce River (Goiás) =

Coordinates: 18°21′24″S 51°14′17″W

Location
- Country: Brazil

Physical characteristics
- Source
  - location: Goiás state
- Mouth
  - location: Claro River

The Doce River (Portuguese, Rio Doce) is a river of Goiás state in central Brazil. It is a tributary of the Claro River, one of the upper tributaries of the Paraná River.

== See also ==
- List of rivers of Goiás
- Tributaries of the Río de la Plata
