= Das Antas River (Goiás) =

Location
- Country: Brazil

Physical characteristics
- Source
  - location: Goiás state
- Mouth: Corumbá River
  - coordinates: 16°17′10″S 48°24′40″W

The Das Antas River is a river of Goiás state in central Brazil.

== See also ==
- List of rivers of Goiás
