= São Bento River =

São Bento River may refer to:

- São Bento River (Goiás), Brazil
- São Bento River (Mãe Luzia River), Brazil
- São Bento River (Rio do Peixe), Brazil
