= Matrinxã River =

Location
- Country: Brazil

Physical characteristics
- Source
  - location: Goiás state
- Mouth
  - location: Diamantina River
  - coordinates: 16°54′S 52°49′W

The Matrinxã River is a river of Goiás state in central Brazil.

== See also ==
- List of rivers of Goiás
