= São Bernardo =

São Bernardo (English: Saint Bernard) may refer to:

== Places ==
- São Bernardo do Campo, Brazil, a municipality
- São Bernardo, Maranhão, Brazil, a municipality
- São Bernardo River (Federal District)
- São Bernardo River (Goiás)
- São Bernardo (parish), Portugal

== Sports ==
- São Bernardo Futebol Clube, a Brazilian football club
- Esporte Clube São Bernardo, a Brazilian football club
- C.D. São Bernardo (handball), a Portuguese handball club

== Other uses ==
- São Bernardo (film), a 1972 film directed by Leon Hirszman

== See also ==
- Saint Bernard (disambiguation)
