= Vermelho River (Corrente River tributary) =

Location
- Country: Brazil

Physical characteristics
- Source
  - location: Goiás state
- Mouth
  - location: Corrente River
  - coordinates: 14°27′S 46°20′W

The Vermelho River is a river of Goiás state in central Brazil. It is a tributary of the Corrente River.

== See also ==
- List of rivers of Goiás
