= Rodeador River =

River in Brazil

Location
- Country: Brazil

Physical characteristics
- Source
  - location: Federal District

The Rodeador River is a river of the Federal District in central Brazil.

== See also ==
- List of rivers of the Federal District
