= Claro River (Preto River tributary) =

Location
- Country: Brazil

Physical characteristics
- Source
  - location: Goiás state
- Mouth
  - location: Preto River
  - coordinates: 13°51′S 47°57′W

The Claro River is a river of Goiás state in central Brazil. It is a tributary of the Preto River.

== See also ==
- List of rivers of Goiás
