= Microlepidogaster discus =

Scientific classification
- Kingdom: Animalia
- Phylum: Chordata
- Class: Actinopterygii
- Division: Teleostei
- Order: Siluriformes
- Family: Loricariidae
- Genus: Microlepidogaster
- Species: M. discus

Binomial name
- Microlepidogaster discus Martins, A. C. Rosa & Langeani, 2014

Species of armored catfish

Microlepidogaster discus is a species of freshwater ray-finned fish belonging to the family Loricariidae, the suckermouth armored catfishes, and the subfamily Hypoptopomatinae. the cascudinhos. This catfish is endemic to the Jequitinhonha River in southeastern Brazil. This species reaches a standard length of 4.6 cm (1.8 in).
