= Alegre River (Goiás) =

Location
- Country: Brazil

Physical characteristics
- Source
  - location: Goiás state
- Mouth: Paranaíba River
  - coordinates: 18°50′S 50°26′W

The Alegre River is a river of Goiás state in central Brazil.

== See also ==
- List of rivers of Goiás
