= Peixe River (Crixás Açu River tributary) =

Location
- Country: Brazil

Physical characteristics
- Source
  - location: Goiás state
- Mouth
  - location: Crixás Açu River
  - coordinates: 14°14′S 49°48′W

The Peixe River is a river of Goiás state in central Brazil. It is a tributary of the Crixás Açu River.

== See also ==
- List of rivers of Goiás
