= Ponte Alta River =

Location
- Country: Brazil

Physical characteristics
- Source
  - location: Goiás state
- Mouth: Corumbá River
  - coordinates: 16°19′S 48°12′W

The Ponte Alta River is a river of Goiás state in central Brazil.

== See also ==
- List of rivers of Goiás
