= Do Sal River (Goiás) =

Location
- Country: Brazil

Physical characteristics
- Source
  - location: Goiás state
- Mouth: Maranhão River
  - coordinates: 15°15′S 48°1′W

The Do Sal River is a river of Goiás state in central Brazil.

== See also ==
- List of rivers of Goiás
