= Microlepidogaster discontenta =

Scientific classification
- Kingdom: Animalia
- Phylum: Chordata
- Class: Actinopterygii
- Order: Siluriformes
- Family: Loricariidae
- Genus: Microlepidogaster
- Species: M. discontenta

Binomial name
- Microlepidogaster discontenta Calegari, E. V. Silva & R. E. dos Reis, 2014

Species of armored catfish

Microlepidogaster discontenta is a species of freshwater ray-finned fish belonging to the family Loricariidae, the suckermouth armored catfishes, and the subfamily Hypoptopomatinae. the cascudinhos. This catfish is endemic to Brazil where it occurs in the basin of the São Francisco River along the borders between the state Minas Gerais and Goiás. This species reaches a standard length of 4 cm (1.6 in).
