= Do Ouro River (Goiás) =

Location
- Country: Brazil

Physical characteristics
- Source
  - location: Goiás state
- Mouth
  - location: Santa Tereza River
  - coordinates: 13°15′S 48°52′W

The Do Ouro River is a river of Goiás state in central Brazil.

== See also ==
- List of rivers of Goiás
