= Microlepidogaster perforata =

Conservation status
- Critically Endangered (IUCN 3.1)

Scientific classification
- Kingdom: Animalia
- Phylum: Chordata
- Class: Actinopterygii
- Order: Siluriformes
- Family: Loricariidae
- Genus: Microlepidogaster
- Species: M. perforata

Binomial name
- Microlepidogaster perforata C. H. Eigenmann & R. S. Eigenmann, 1889

Synonyms
- Otocinclus perforatus (C. H. Eigenmann & R. S. Eigenmann, 1889)

Species of fish

Microlepidogaster perforata is a species of freshwater ray-finned fish belonging to the family Loricariidae, the suckermouth armored catfishes, and the subfamily Hypoptopomatinae. the cascudinhos. This catfish is endemic to Brazil where it only known from the Carandaí River, a tributary of the das Velhas River in the state of Minas Gerais. This species reaches a standard length of 5 cm (2.0 in).
