= Peixe River (Das Almas River tributary) =

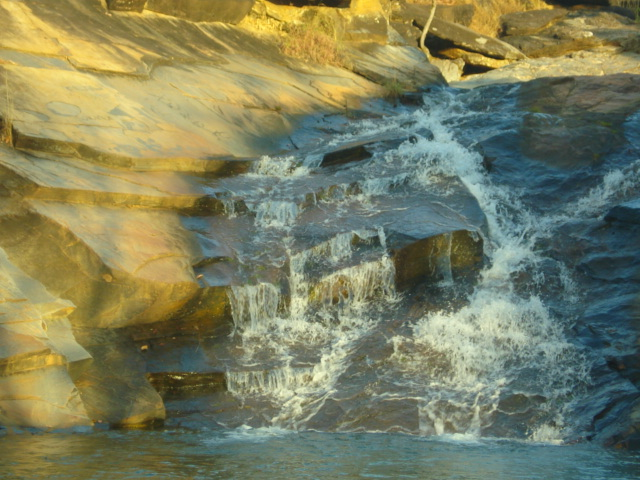

Location
- Country: Brazil

Physical characteristics
- Source
  - location: Goiás state
- Mouth: Das Almas River
  - coordinates: 15°11′S 49°30′W

The Peixe River is a river of Goiás state in central Brazil. It is a tributary of the Das Almas River.

== See also ==
- List of rivers of Goiás
