= Dourados River (Goiás) =

Location
- Country: Brazil

Physical characteristics
- Source
  - location: Goiás state
- Mouth: Meia Ponte River
  - coordinates: 17°28′S 49°17′W

The Dourados River is a river of Goiás state in central Brazil.

== See also ==
- List of rivers of Goiás
