= Salabro River =

Location
- Country: Brazil

Physical characteristics
- Source
  - location: Goiás state
- Mouth
  - location: Minas Gerais state
  - coordinates: 16°8′S 46°45′W

The Salabro River is a river of Minas Gerais and Goiás states in central Brazil.

== See also ==
- List of rivers of Goiás
- List of rivers of Minas Gerais
