= Peixe (disambiguation) =

Peixe (Portuguese for "fish") is a municipality in the state of Tocantins, Brazil. It may also refer to:

- Santos FC, also known by their nickname "Peixe"
- Peixe (crater), a crater on Mars
- Emílio Peixe (born 1973), Portuguese footballer
- Renato Peixe (born 1979), Brazilian football manager and player
- Zé Peixe (1927–2012), Brazilian maritime pilot
- Peixes, a character in the webcomic Homestuck

== See also ==
- Peixe River (disambiguation)
- César Guerra-Peixe (1914–1993), Brazilian musician
