= Macambira River (Goiás) =

Location
- Country: Brazil

Physical characteristics
- Source
  - location: Goiás state
- Mouth
  - coordinates: 14°21′S 46°49′W

The Macambira River is a river of Goiás state in central Brazil.

== See also ==
- List of rivers of Goiás
