= Preto River (Paranaíba River tributary) =

River in Goiás, Brazil

Location
- Country: Brazil

Physical characteristics
- Source
  - location: Goiás state
- Mouth: Paranaíba River
  - coordinates: 18°43′S 50°21′W

The Preto River is a river of Goiás state in central Brazil. It is a tributary of the Paranaíba River.

== See also ==
- List of rivers of Goiás
