= Turvo River (Goiás) =

Location
- Country: Brazil

Physical characteristics
- Source
  - location: Goiás state
- Mouth: Rio dos Bois
  - coordinates: 17°46′S 50°13′W

The Turvo River is a river of Goiás state in central Brazil.

== See also ==
- List of rivers of Goiás
