= Samambaia River (Goiás) =

Location
- Country: Brazil

Physical characteristics
- Source
  - location: Goiás state
- Mouth: São Marcos River
  - coordinates: 16°29′S 47°29′W

The Samambaia River is a river of Goiás state in central Brazil.

== See also ==
- List of rivers of Goiás
