= Jacuba River =

Coordinates: 18°23′26″S 52°28′10″W

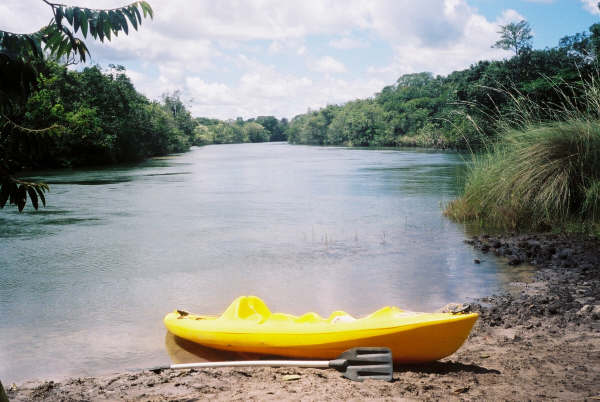

Location
- Country: Brazil

Physical characteristics
- Source
  - location: Goiás state

The Jacuba River is a river of Goiás state in central Brazil.

== See also ==
- List of rivers of Goiás
