= Melchior River =

Coordinates: 15°56′S 48°14′W

Location
- Country: Brazil

Physical characteristics
- Source
  - location: Federal District

The Melchior River is a river of the Federal District in central Brazil.

== See also ==
- List of rivers of the Federal District
