= Rio Verde (Das Almas River tributary) =

Verde River

Location
- Country: Brazil

Physical characteristics
- Source
  - location: Goiás state
- Mouth: Das Almas River
  - coordinates: 15°20′S 49°36′W

Rio Verde (Portuguese for "green river") is a river of Goiás state in central Brazil. It is a tributary of the Das Almas River.

== See also ==
- List of rivers of Goiás
