= Microlepidogaster bourguyi =

Scientific classification
- Kingdom: Animalia
- Phylum: Chordata
- Class: Actinopterygii
- Order: Siluriformes
- Family: Loricariidae
- Genus: Microlepidogaster
- Species: M. bourguyi

Binomial name
- Microlepidogaster bourguyi A. Miranda-Ribeiro, 1911

Species of armored catfish

Microlepidogaster bourguyi is possibly a species of freshwater ray-finned fish belonging to the family Loricariidae, the suckermouth armored catfishes, and the subfamily Hypoptopomatinae. the cascudinhos. The species was first formally described in 1911 by the Brazilian zoologist Alípio de Miranda-Ribeiro, who gave its type locality as "Brazil". The syntype was located in the National Museum of Brazil but its identity is unconfirmed meaning that this taxon is a species inquirenda. The specific name honors the Brazilian zoologist and curator, Hermillo Bourguy Macedo de Mendonça, who Miranda-Ribeiro studied under, later becoming his deputy at the National Museum.
