= Corrente River (Paranã River tributary) =

Location
- Country: Brazil

Physical characteristics
- Source
  - location: Goiás state
- Mouth
  - location: Paranã River
  - coordinates: 14°13′S 46°59′W

The Corrente River is a river of Goiás state in central Brazil. It is a tributary of the Paranã River.

== See also ==
- List of rivers of Goiás
