= Rio Verde (Maranhão River tributary) =

Location
- Country: Brazil

Physical characteristics
- Source
  - location: Goiás state
- Mouth: Maranhão River
  - coordinates: 15°23′S 48°34′W

Rio Verde (Portuguese for "green river") is a river of Goiás state in central Brazil. It is a tributary of the Maranhão River.

== See also ==
- List of rivers of Goiás
