= São Patrício River =

Coordinates: 14°59′22″S 49°19′29″W

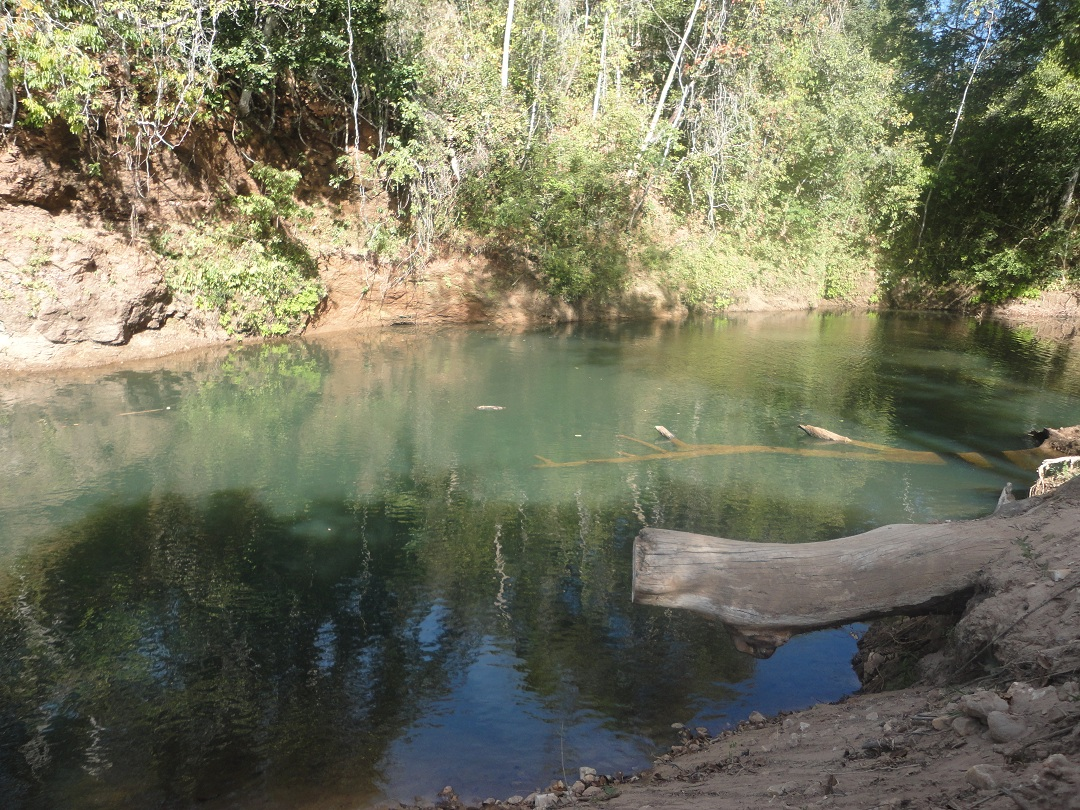

Location
- Country: Brazil

Physical characteristics
- Source
  - location: Goiás state

The São Patrício River is a river of Goiás state in central Brazil.

== See also ==
- List of rivers of Goiás
