= Pipiripau River =

Coordinates: 15°41′S 47°41′W

Location
- Country: Brazil

Physical characteristics
- Source
  - location: Federal District

The Pipiripau River is a river of the Federal District in central Brazil.

== See also ==
- List of rivers of the Federal District
