= Pintado River =

Coordinates: 13°34′S 50°28′W

Location
- Country: Brazil

Physical characteristics
- Source
  - location: Goiás state

The Pintado River is a river of Goiás state in central Brazil.

== See also ==
- List of rivers of Goiás
