= São Tomás River =

Coordinates: 17°52′46″S 50°25′32″W

Location
- Country: Brazil

Physical characteristics
- Source
  - location: Goiás state

The São Tomás River is a river of Goiás state in central Brazil.

== See also ==
- List of rivers of Goiás
