= Microlepidogaster dimorpha =

Conservation status
- Least Concern (IUCN 3.1)

Scientific classification
- Kingdom: Animalia
- Phylum: Chordata
- Class: Actinopterygii
- Order: Siluriformes
- Family: Loricariidae
- Genus: Microlepidogaster
- Species: M. dimorpha

Binomial name
- Microlepidogaster dimorpha Martins & Langeani, 2011

Species of armored catfish

Microlepidogaster dimorpha is a species of freshwater ray-finned fish belonging to the family Loricariidae, the suckermouth armored catfishes, and the subfamily Hypoptopomatinae. the cascudinhos. This catfish is endemic to tributaries of the upper Rio Grande, upper Paraná system in the Brazilian state of Minas Gerais. This species reaches a standard length of 3.8 cm (1.5 in).
