= Microlepidogaster =

Scientific classification
- Kingdom: Animalia
- Phylum: Chordata
- Class: Actinopterygii
- Division: Teleostei
- Order: Siluriformes
- Family: Loricariidae
- Subfamily: Hypoptopomatinae
- Genus: Microlepidogaster; C. H. Eigenmann & R. S. Eigenmann, 1889

Type species
- Microlepidogaster perforatus C. H. Eigenmann & R. S. Eigenmann, 1889

Genus of fishes

Microlepidogaster is a genus of freshwater ray-finned fish belonging to the family Loricariidae, the suckermouth armoured catfishes, and the subfamily Hypoptopomatinae, the cascudinhos. The catfishes in this genus are found in South America.

== Species ==
There are currently 8 recognized species in this genus:

- Microlepidogaster arachas Martins, Calegari & Langeani, 2013
- Microlepidogaster dimorpha Martins & Langeani, 2011
- Microlepidogaster discontenta Calegari, E. V. Silva & R. E. dos Reis, 2014
- Microlepidogaster discus Martins, A. C. Rosa & Langeani, 2014
- Microlepidogaster longicolla Calegari & R. E. dos Reis, 2010
- Microlepidogaster negomata Martins, Cherobim, Andrade & Langeani, 2017
- Microlepidogaster perforata C. H. Eigenmann & R. S. Eigenmann, 1889
- Microlepidogaster roseae Martins, 2022

Species inquirenda

- Microlepidogaster bourguyi A. Miranda-Ribeiro, 1911
