= Rio Verde (lower Paranaíba River tributary) =

River in Goiás, Brazil

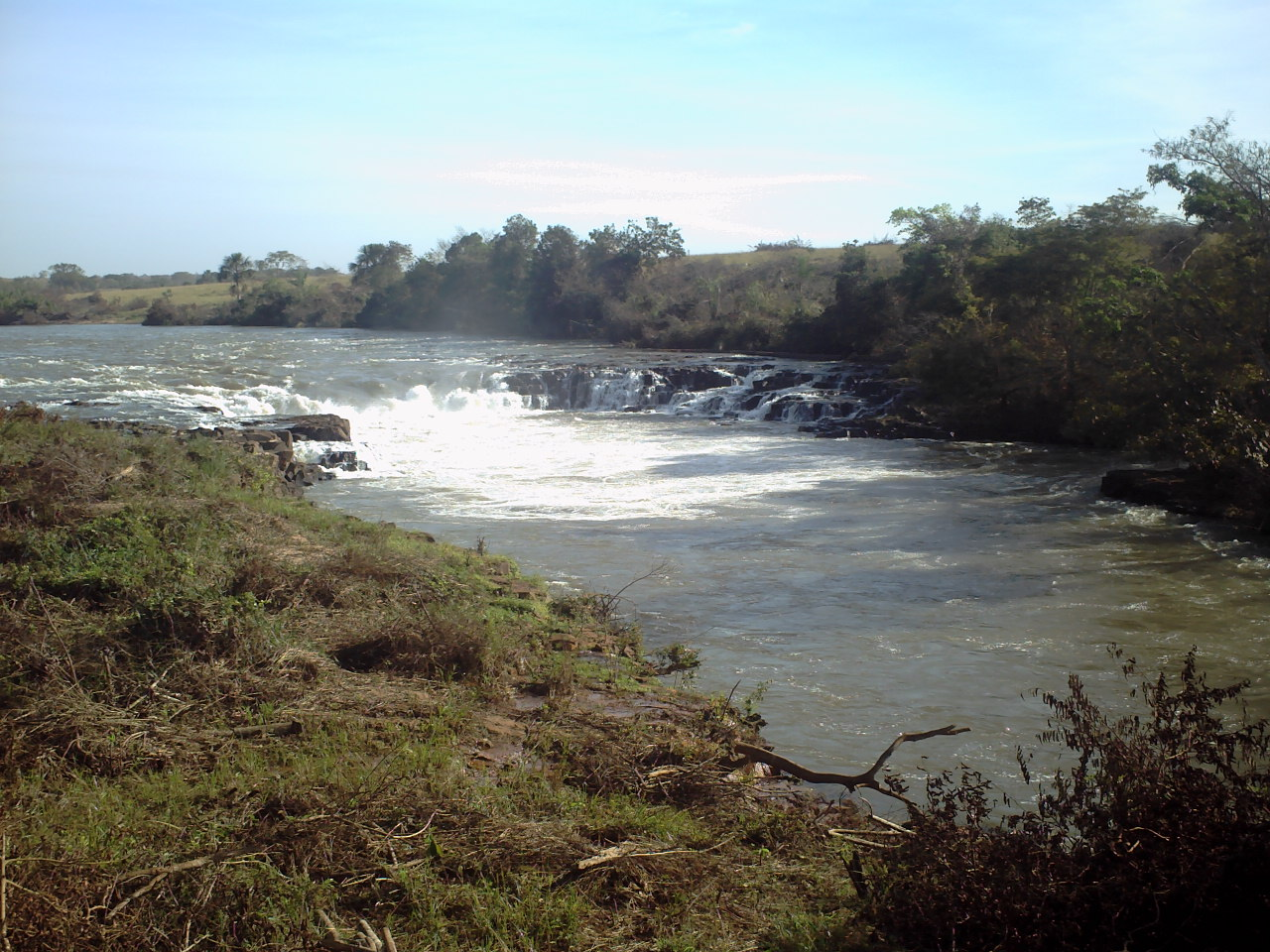

Location
- Country: Brazil

Physical characteristics
- Source
  - location: Goiás state
- Mouth: Paranaíba River
  - coordinates: 19°11′S 50°44′W

Rio Verde (Portuguese for "green river") is a river of Goiás state in central Brazil. This freshwater source supports agricultural activities in the area, such as large-scale soy, corn, and cattle farming.

== See also ==
- List of rivers of Goiás
