= Peixe River (upper Araguaia River tributary) =

Location
- Country: Brazil

Physical characteristics
- Source
  - location: Goiás state
- Mouth
  - location: Araguaia River
  - coordinates: 16°31′S 52°38′W

The Peixe River is a river of Goiás state in central Brazil. It is a tributary of the Araguaia River. The Peixe River flows through a portion of the Cerrado, a biome known for its rich biodiversity and ecological importance. Rivers in this region, including the Peixe, play are important in sustaining aquatic life and providing water resources for agriculture and human use.

This biodiversity is under increasing pressure due to deforestation, agricultural expansion, and hydroelectric projects that threaten natural river systems. In the broader Araguaia basin, efforts are being made to promote conservation and sustainable management to mitigate these impacts, as the river systems remain vulnerable to habitat degradation and pollution.

== See also ==
- List of rivers of Goiás
