= Claro fair trade =

claro fair trade
- Company type: Aktiengesellschaft
- Industry: sustainable retail
- Founded: 1977; 49 years ago
- Headquarters: Orpund, Switzerland
- Number of locations: about 100
- Area served: Switzerland
- Products: ethical and sustainable food and agricultural products in general, artisan craftwork, UNICA fashion label, sustainable cosmetics
- Services: Retail shops
- Revenue: 15,472,340 CHF (2014)
- Operating income: −212,960 CHF (2014)
- Number of employees: 61 (June 2014)
- Website: www.claro.ch

claro fair trade, commonly shortened to claro and written in minuscules, is a sustainability-oriented retail company based in Orpund, Biel/Bienne administrative district, in the Swiss Canton of Bern. claro was initiated by Erklärung von Bern, a sustainability-oriented independent solidarity development in Switzerland, in 1977.

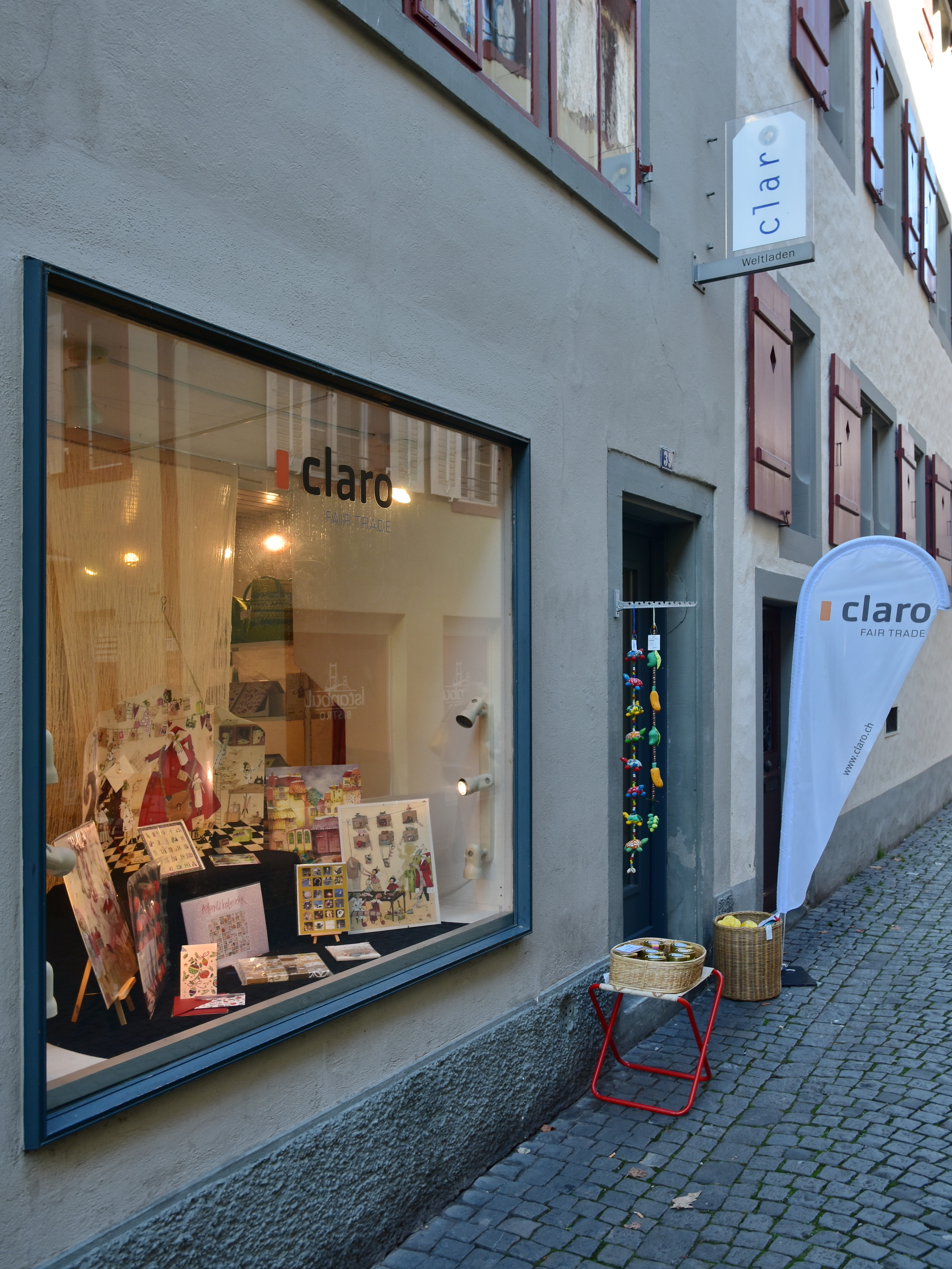
Weltladen, Kluggasse in Rapperswil

== History and orientation ==
The history of fair trade in Switzerland is closely linked to the rise of the solidarity movement in Switzerland in the 1970s, and the political development organizations such as the Erklärung von Bern (EvB) consumer actions. At that time, products such as coffee, bananas and jute were symbols of the growing support for displaying developmental contexts. At the same time consumers demanded more engagement for development aid without supporting the charity mentality. The success of these actions occurred to the establishment of a joint Swiss import central named OS3 that was pioneering fair trade, and specialized in the sale of food and crafts from developing trading partners, i.e. small producers from economic marginal areas, an alternative approach to the world trade.

Besides OS3, in 1977 EvB initiated the organisation Suisse Tiers Monde which became the first two claro fair trade labels; they resulted in the collaboration with Corr-the jute works situated in Bangladesh. In the following years the product line was expanded gradually, among them cane sugar from the Philippines and other agriculture products from the so-called third world countries, for example coffee from Tanzania, and tea from Sri Lanka, and the cooperative El Ceibo in Bolivia around 1985, and as today the popular claro shops in Switzerland, among other sustainable initiatives financially supported by the Alternative Bank Schweiz ABS.

In 1997 the claro fair trade cooperative was transformed into an Aktiengesellschaft according to the Swiss law. claro fair trade claims as ultimate goals the continuous improvement of the social, economic and environmental situation of their producers. These include the minimization of middlemen in favor of direct cooperation with local partners and supporting social projects. Whenever possible, the products are certified by the Max Havelaar Foundation.

== Weltladen and claro shops ==
claro contributes its products in the so-called claro and associated Weltladen shops. As other sustainable corporations, there was a decrease in turnover in the past fiscal years, mainly caused to reduced export of the products outside Switzerland.

The distributor claimed, as of 2014, to support by its import activities more than 260 small producer groups and craft shops, and thus improved the living conditions of more than 100,000 people from the Southern Hemisphere.

== Literature ==
- Andreas Missbach: Saubere Rendite – Ökologisch und sozial verantwortungsvoll investieren. Ott Verlag, Bern 2007, ISBN 978-3-7225-0084-3.
- Anne-Marie Hollenstein, Regula Renschler, Rudolf Strahm: Entwicklung heisst Befreiung. Erinnerungen an die Pionierzeit der Erklärung von Bern (1968–1985). Chronos, Zürich 2008, ISBN 978-3-0340-0917-1.
- Renate Spörri: Der Einfluss der Erklärung von Bern auf den Bund. In: Von der Entwicklungshilfe zur Entwicklungspolitik, published by P. Hug and B. Mesmer, Bern 1993.
