= Peixe River (Corumbá River tributary) =

Location
- Country: Brazil

Physical characteristics
- Source
  - location: Goiás state
- Mouth: Corumbá River
  - coordinates: 17°37′S 48°29′W

The Peixe River is a river of Goiás State in central Brazil.

It flows into the Corumbá River.

== See also ==
- List of rivers of Goiás
