= Piracanjuba River (Corumbá River tributary) =

Location
- Country: Brazil

Physical characteristics
- Source
  - location: Goiás state
- Mouth: Corumbá River
  - coordinates: 17°18′S 48°12′W

The Piracanjuba River is a river of Goiás state in central Brazil. It is a tributary of the Corumbá River.

== See also ==
- List of rivers of Goiás
