= Descoberto River =

River in Brazil

Location
- Country: Brazil

Physical characteristics
- Source
  - location: Goiás state
- Mouth: Corumbá River
  - coordinates: 16°19′S 48°13′W

Basin features
- River system: Río de la Plata

The Descoberto River is a river of Goiás state in central Brazil. It forms the western boundary of the Federal District.

== See also ==
- List of rivers of Goiás
