= Rio Verde (upper Paranaíba River tributary) =

Coordinates: 18°3′31″S 47°17′1″W

Location
- Country: Brazil

Physical characteristics
- Source
  - location: Goiás state
- Mouth
  - location: Paranaíba River

Rio Verde (Portuguese for "green river") is a river of Goiás state in central Brazil. It is a tributary of the Paranaíba River which is the right headstream of the Paraná River.

== See also ==
- List of rivers of Goiás
- List of tributaries of the Río de la Plata
