= Claro Ecuador =

Ecuadorian telecommunications operator

- Type: Subsidiary of América Móvil
- Founded: 1993
- Headquarters: Guayaquil, Ecuador
- Key people: Carlos Slim Helu
- Products: Telephone, mobile telephone, internet, digital television
- Parent: América Móvil
- Website: claro.com.ec

Claro Ecuador (formerly Porta) is a large Ecuadorian telecommunication operator, owned by a Mexican group América Móvil. It provides mobile and fixed phone, internet and television service. As of 2024, Claro Ecuador has about 8.6 million mobile users, making it the largest telecommunication provider in the country with a market share of around 62%. Most of its users are on prepaid plans, which account for over 7.3 million subscribers

Claro Ecuador was originally called Porta, it was founded in 1993 and used to be the largest telecommunication provider in Ecuador in the 1990s. In the year 2000, the Mexican telecommunication América Móvil, owned by billionaire Carlos Slim, acquired Porta and integrated it into its operations across Latin America.

In 2011, Porta was officially rebranded itself to Claro, which was part of América Móvil's strategy to unify its telecommunications services under the same name throughout the region.
