= Rio Verdão =

Location
- Country: Brazil

Physical characteristics
- Source
  - location: Goiás state
- Mouth: Rio dos Bois
  - coordinates: 18°1′S 50°14′W

Rio Verdão (Portuguese for "Big Green river") is a river of Goiás state in central Brazil. It is a tributary of the Rio dos Bois.

== See also ==
- List of rivers of Goiás
