= Claro River (Paranaíba River tributary) =

Coordinates: 19°7′56″S 50°38′40″W

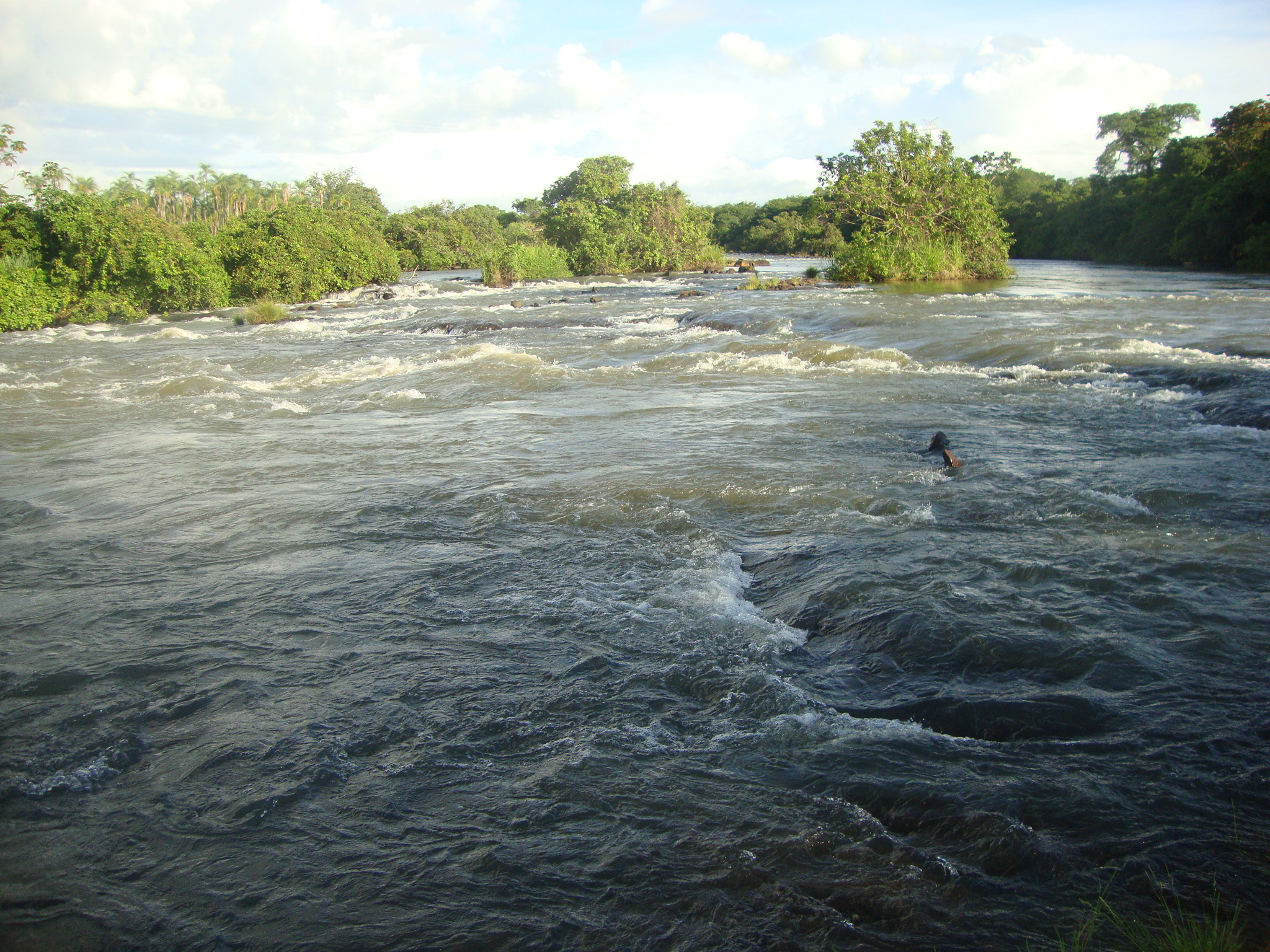

Location
- Country: Brazil

Physical characteristics
- Source
  - location: Goiás state
- Mouth
  - location: Paranaíba River

The Claro River (Portuguese, Rio Claro) is a river of Goiás state in central Brazil. It is a tributary of the Paranaíba River, which it enters just downriver of São Simão Dam.

== See also ==
- List of rivers of Goiás
- Tributaries of the Río de la Plata
