= Cana Brava River (upper Tocantins River tributary) =

Location
- Country: Brazil

Physical characteristics
- Source
  - location: Goiás state
- Mouth
  - location: upper Tocantins River
  - coordinates: 13°12′S 48°10′W

The Cana Brava River is a river of Goiás state in central Brazil. It is a tributary of the Tocantins River.

== See also ==
- List of rivers of Goiás
