= Aporé River =

Coordinates: 19°27′29″S 50°56′26″W

Location
- Country: Brazil

Physical characteristics
- Source
  - location: Goiás state
- Mouth
  - location: Paranaíba River

The Aporé River (Portuguese, Rio Aporé, also called Rio do Peixe) is a river forming the border between Goiás and Mato Grosso do Sul states in central Brazil. It is a tributary of the Paranaíba River, which enters the reservoir created by Ilha Solteira Dam on the Paraná River.

== See also ==
- List of rivers of Goiás
- List of rivers of Mato Grosso do Sul
- Tributaries of the Río de la Plata
