= Itumbiara Dam =

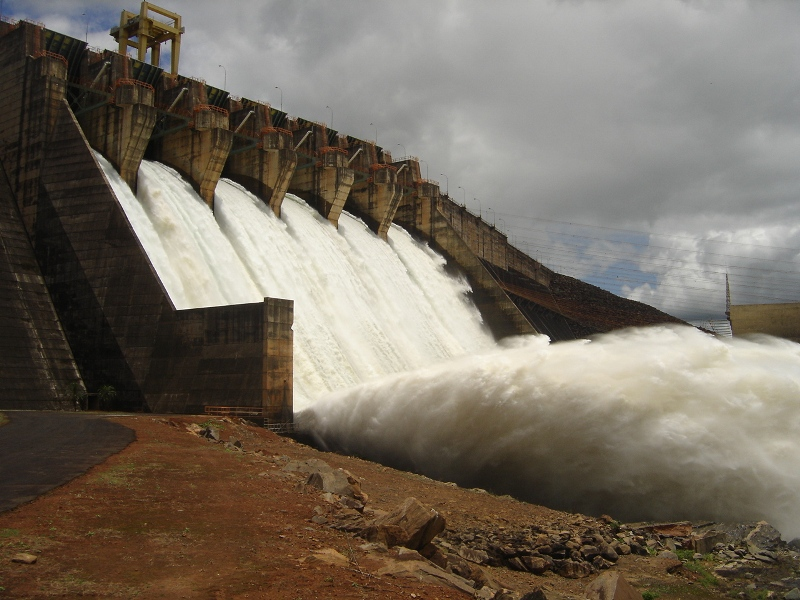

- Location within Brazil
- Official name: Usina de Itumbiara
- Location: Itumbiara, Goiás, Brazil
- Coordinates: 18°24′28″S 49°5′54″W
- Construction began: 1974
- Opening date: 1980
- Construction cost: $716 million USD
- Operator: Eletrobrás Furnas

Dam and spillways
- Type of dam: Embankment
- Impounds: Paranaíba River
- Height: 106 m (348 ft)
- Length: 7,000 m (23,000 ft)
- Dam volume: 33,300,000 m^{3} (1.18×10^{9} cu ft)
- Spillway type: Service, gate-controlled
- Spillway capacity: 16,000 m^{3}/s (570,000 cu ft/s)

Reservoir
- Creates: Itumbiara Reservoir
- Total capacity: 17,000×10^{6} m^{3} (14,000,000 acre⋅ft)
- Surface area: 778 km^{2} (300 sq mi)

Power Station
- Commission date: 1980-1981
- Turbines: 6 Francis-type
- Installed capacity: 2,082 MW (2,792,000 hp)

The Itumbiara Dam is an embankment dam on the Paranaíba River near Itumbiara in Goiás, Brazil. The dam serves an associated hydroelectric power plant with a 2,082 megawatts (2,792,000 hp) installed capacity. The power plant is the sixth largest in Brazil and has the largest installed capacity of Eletrobrás Furnas' power plants.

== Background ==
Between 1963 and 1965, a consortium of U.S., Canadian and Brazilian engineering firms studied and selected sites in Brazil for dams that would assist in developing the region with electricity. Originally, the Itumbiara Dam was to have a shorter height which would accommodate two other dams upstream. A change in plans raised the height of the dam, increasing the reservoir, eliminating the need for the two dams upstream and doubling power production.

== Construction ==
Construction on the dam and power plant began in November 1974 and the river was diverted by September 1, 1976. On October 1, 1979, the reservoir behind the dam began to fill and on September 30, 1979, the left embankment was complete while the right was on November 30 of that same year. The whole dam was completed in April 1980. Despite poor weather along with engineering and technical difficulties, the project was completed on time. 97% of the firms working on the project were Brazilian and 90% of the supplies provided for construction were from Brazil. The dam and power plant was originally estimated to cost $439 million but ended over $716 million when construction was complete. Including the electrical transmission system, the whole project cost just over $1 billion. $125 million for construction was financed by the World Bank.

== Itumbiara Hydroelectric Power Plant ==
On April 27, 1980, the first generator went online and the last on December 30, 1981 just two weeks after the power house was complete. In 1997, the controls for the plant were switched to remote operation in a central plant in Corumba, leaving the control room unmanned. The power house is 25 m (82 ft) wide and 223 m (732 ft) long and contains six 347 MW generators that are powered by Francis turbines.

== Specifications ==
The Itumbiara Dam is a 7,000 metres (23,000 ft) long and 106 metres (348 ft) high earth-fill embankment dam with a concrete spillway and power house section. The earthen portion of the dam contains 31,500,000 cubic metres (1.11×10^{9} cu ft) of earth fill while the concrete portion contains 1,800,000 cubic metres (64,000,000 cu ft) for a total structural volume of 33,300,000 cubic metres (1.18×10^{9} cu ft). The dam's spillway contains six floodgates that are 15 metres (49 ft) wide and 9 metres (30 ft) high each. In total, the spillway has a 16,000 cubic metres per second (570,000 cu ft/s) discharge capacity.

== See also ==
- List of power stations in Brazil
