= Preto River (Tocantins River tributary) =

River in Goiás, Brazil

Location
- Country: Brazil

Physical characteristics
- Source
  - location: Goiás state
- Mouth
  - location: Tocantins River
  - coordinates: 13°38′S 48°7′W

The Preto River is a river of Goiás state in central Brazil. It is a tributary of the Tocantins River.

== See also ==
- List of rivers of Goiás
