= Río Verde Canton =

- Canton
- Location of Esmeraldas Province in Ecuador.

- Rioverde Canton in Esmeraldas Province
- Coordinates: 1.0602°N 79.4044°W
- Country: Ecuador
- Province: Esmeraldas Province

Area
  - Total: 1,513 km^{2} (584 sq mi)

Population (2022 census)
  - Total: 32,885
  - Density: 21.73/km^{2} (56.29/sq mi)
- Time zone: UTC-5 (ECT)

Río Verde Canton is a canton of Ecuador, located in the Esmeraldas Province. Its capital is the town of Rioverde. Its population at the 2001 census was 22,164.

== Demographics ==
Ethnic groups as of the Ecuadorian census of 2010:

- Afro-Ecuadorian 57.1%
- Mestizo 34.4%
- White 5.0%
- Montubio 2.2%
- Indigenous 1.3%
- Other 0.2%
