= Corrente River (Paranaíba River tributary) =

Coordinates: 19°18′42″S 50°50′19″W

Location
- Country: Brazil

Physical characteristics
- Source
  - location: Goiás state
- Mouth
  - location: Paranaíba River

The Corrente River (Portuguese, Rio Corrente) is a river of Goiás state in central Brazil. It is a tributary of the Paranaíba River, which it enters in the reservoir created by Ilha Solteira Dam, on the Paraná River.

== See also ==
- List of rivers of Goiás
- Tributaries of the Río de la Plata
