= Piracanjuba River (Paranaíba River tributary) =

Location
- Country: Brazil

Physical characteristics
- Source
  - location: Goiás state
- Mouth: Paranaíba River
  - coordinates: 18°13′S 48°48′W

The Piracanjuba River is a river of Goiás state in central Brazil. It is a tributary of the Paranaíba River.

== See also ==
- List of rivers of Goiás
