= São Bernardo River (Federal District) =

Location
- Country: Brazil
- Federative units: Goiás; Federal District

Physical characteristics
- Source
  - location: Goiás state
- Mouth: Preto River
  - coordinates: 16°3′S 47°18′W

The São Bernardo River is a river of Goiás state and the Federal District in central Brazil. It is a tributary of the Preto River.

== See also ==
- List of rivers of Goiás
