= Rio dos Bois (Paranaíba River tributary) =

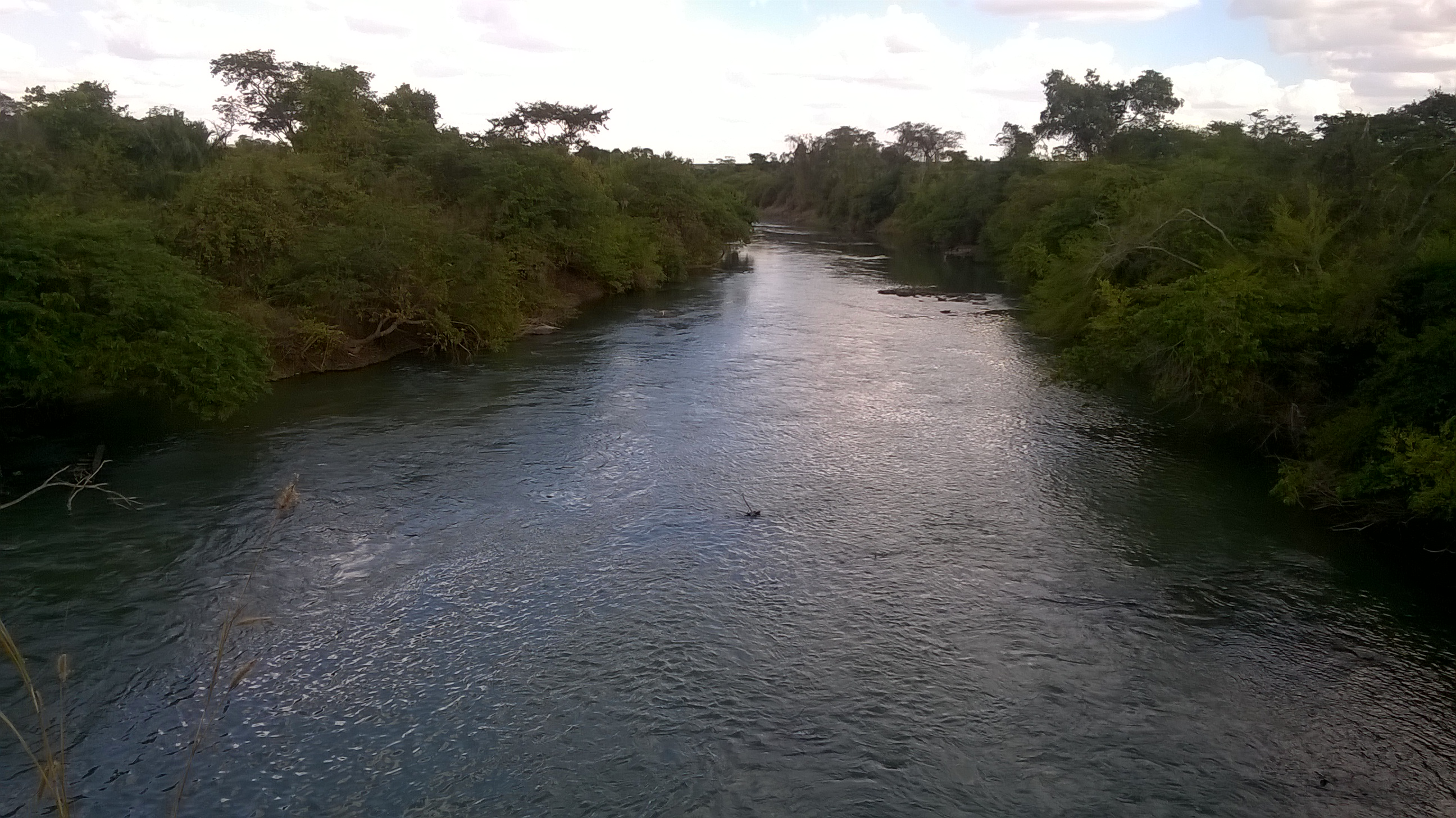

Location
- Country: Brazil

Physical characteristics
- Source
  - location: Goiás state
- Mouth
  - location: Paranaíba River
  - coordinates: 18.592°S 50.031°W

The Rio dos Bois is a river of Goiás state in central Brazil. It flows into the São Simão reservoir, which is fed and drained by the Paranaíba River, near Inaciolândia.

== See also ==
- List of rivers of Goiás
