= Caiapó River (Goiás) =

Location
- Country: Brazil

Physical characteristics
- Source
  - location: Goiás state
- Mouth
  - location: Araguaia River
  - coordinates: 15°49′S 51°53′W

The Caiapó River is a river of Goiás state in central Brazil.

== See also ==
- List of rivers of Goiás
