= São Marcos River =

Coordinates: 18°14′44″S 47°36′44″W

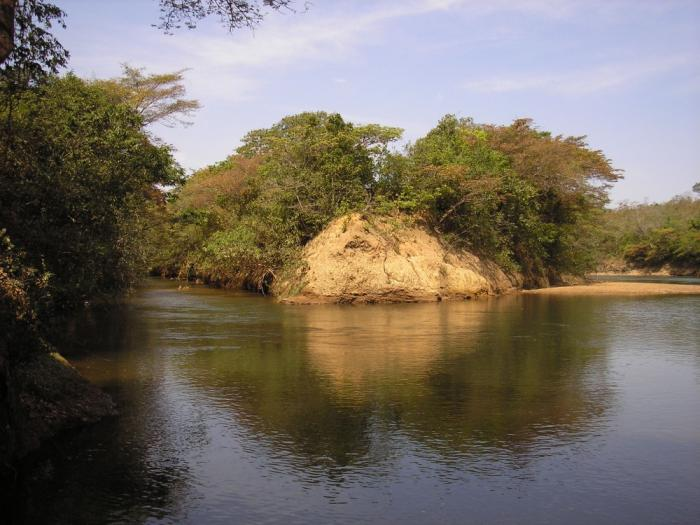

Location
- Country: Brazil

Physical characteristics
- Source
  - location: Goiás state
- Mouth
  - location: Paranaíba River

The São Marcos River (Portuguese, Rio São Marcos) is a river of Goiás state in central Brazil. It is a tributary of the Paranaíba River, which it joins in the reservoir created by Emborcação Dam.

== See also ==
- List of rivers of Goiás
- Tributaries of the Río de la Plata
