= São Simão Dam =

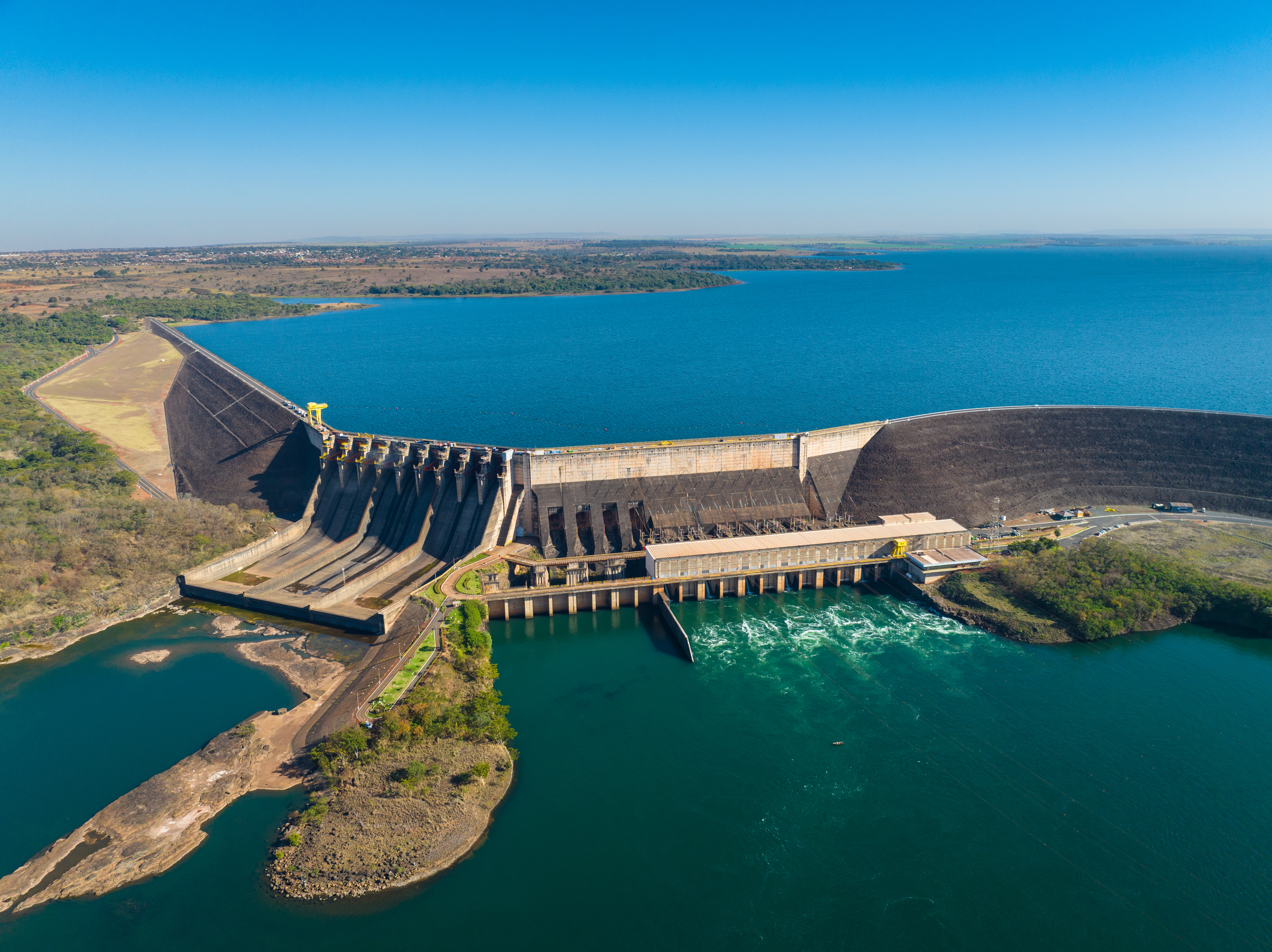

- Location within Brazil
- Official name: Usina de São Simão
- Location: São Simão, Goiás/Minas Gerais, Brazil
- Coordinates: 19°1′9″S 50°30′1″W
- Opening date: 1978
- Owner: CEMIG

Dam and spillways
- Type of dam: Embankment, concrete portion
- Impounds: Paranaíba River
- Height: 127 m (417 ft)
- Length: 3,600 m (11,800 ft)
- Spillway type: Service, gate-controlled

Reservoir
- Creates: São Simão Reservoir
- Total capacity: 12.5 km^{3} (10,100,000 acre⋅ft)
- Surface area: 703 km^{2} (271 sq mi)

Power Station
- Commission date: 1978-1979
- Type: Conventional
- Turbines: 6 x Francis turbines
- Installed capacity: 1,710 MW (2,290,000 hp)
- Annual generation: 12.5×10^{6} MWh (45,000,000 GJ) (2008)

The São Simão Dam is an embankment dam on the Paranaíba River near São Simão in Goiás/Minas Gerais, Brazil. It was constructed for hydroelectric power production and flood control. The dam was completed in 1978 and all generators were operational by 1979. In 1977, the first use of roller compacted concrete in Brazilian dam construction occurred on the São Simão.

== Specifications ==
The dam is 3,600 metres (11,800 ft) long and 127 metres (417 ft) high embankment dam with concrete spillway and power plant sections.

== Reservoir ==
The dam's reservoir has a surface area of 703 square kilometres (271 sq mi) and a capacity of 12.5 cubic kilometres (10,100,000 acre⋅ft) of which 5.54 cubic kilometres (4,490,000 acre⋅ft) is live.

== São Simão Hydroelectric Power Plant ==
The dam's power station contains six 285 megawatts (382,000 hp) generators powered by Francis turbines for a total installed capacity of 1,710 megawatts (2,290,000 hp). There is additional room for four more generators in the power stations but there are no plans to have them installed currently.

== See also ==
- List of power stations in Brazil
