= Peixe River (lower Araguaia River tributary) =

Location
- Country: Brazil

Physical characteristics
- Source
  - location: Goiás state
- Mouth
  - location: Araguaia River
  - coordinates: 14°6′S 50°50′W

The Peixe River is a river of Goiás state in central Brazil. It is a tributary of the Araguaia River.

== See also ==
- List of rivers of Goiás
