= Crixás Mirim River =

Coordinates: 13°19′S 50°37′W

Location
- Country: Brazil

Physical characteristics
- Source
  - location: Goiás state

The Crixás Mirim River is a river of Goiás state in central Brazil.

== See also ==
- List of rivers of Goiás
