= Rioverde, Ecuador =

Rioverde
- Town
- Location within Ecuador
- Coordinates: 1°3′37″N 79°24′36″W
- Ecuador: Ecuador
- Province: Esmeraldas
- Canton: Río Verde
- Founded: July 22, 1996

Area
  - Town: 1.42 km^{2} (0.55 sq mi)
- Elevation: 6 m (20 ft)

Population (2022 census)
  - Town: 4,010
  - Density: 2,820/km^{2} (7,310/sq mi)
- Time zone: UTC-5 (ECT)
- Area code: (+593) 6
- Climate: Aw

Rioverde is a coastal town in northwestern Ecuador. It is the seat of the Río Verde Canton.
