= Paranaíba River =

River in Brazil

Paranaíba River Río Paranaíba
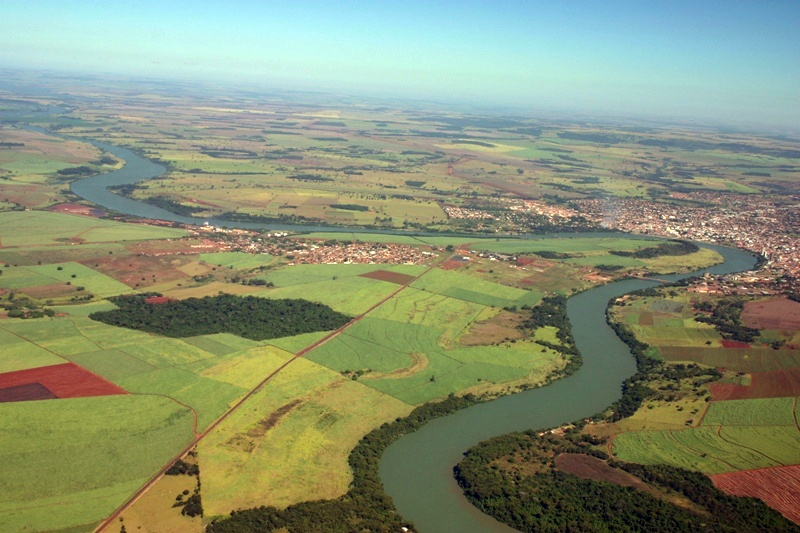
- The Paranaíba river between Araporã and Itumbiara

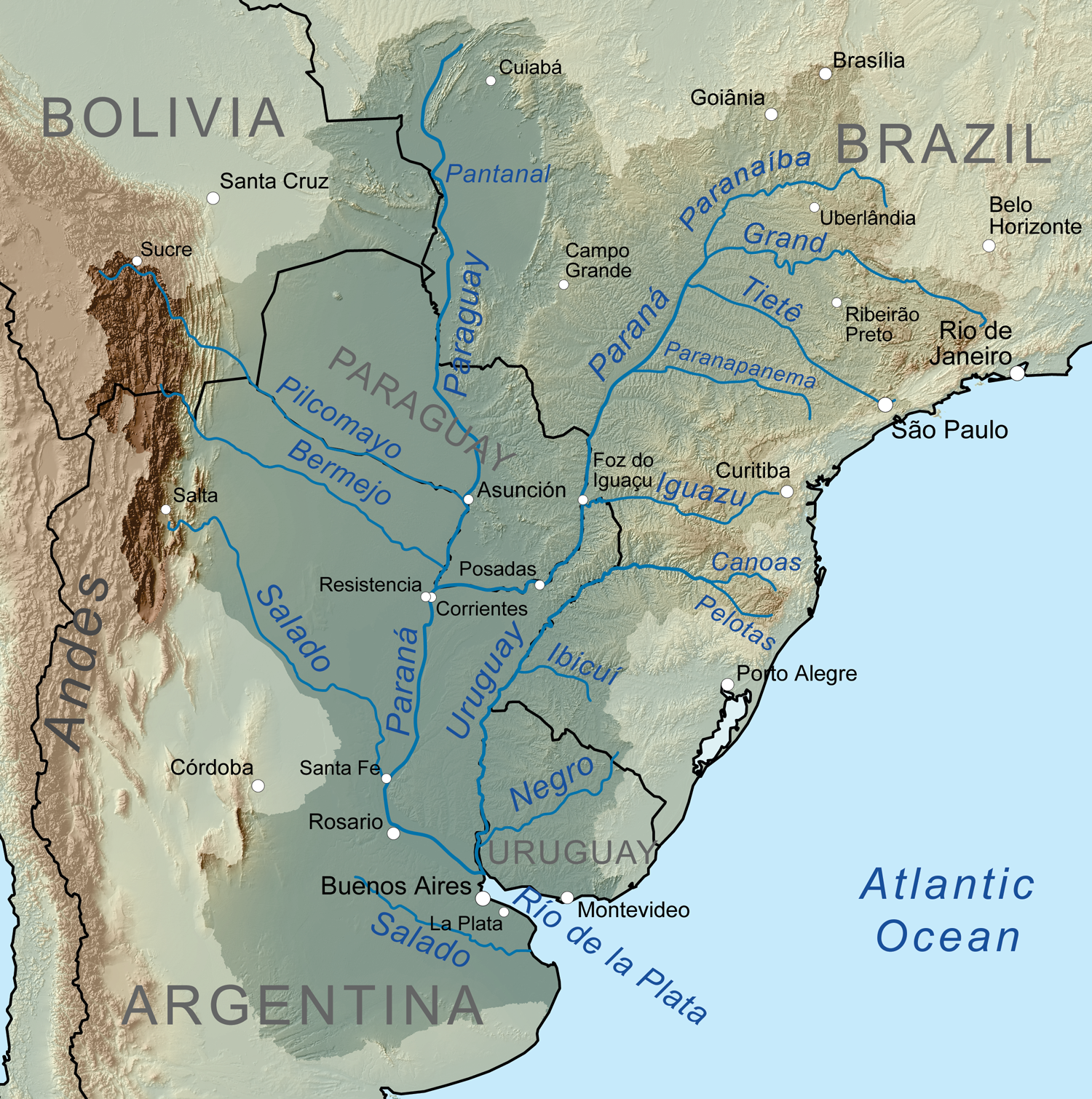
- Map of the La Plata Basin, showing the Paranaíba River joining the Grande River to form the Paraná River.

Location
- Country: Brazil
- State: Minas Gerais

Physical characteristics
- Source: Serra da Mata da Corda
  - location: Rio Paranaíba, Minas Gerais, Brazil
  - coordinates: 19°13′21″S 46°10′28″W
  - elevation: 1,148 m (3,766 ft)
- Mouth: Paraná River
  - location: confluence with Grande River, Brazil
  - coordinates: 20°4′43″S 51°0′22″W
  - elevation: 328 m (1,076 ft)
- Length: 1,000 km (620 mi)
- Basin size: 34,400 km^{2} (13,300 sq mi)
- Discharge
  - average: 796 m^{3}/s (28,100 cu ft/s)

Basin features
- River system: Río de la Plata
- Tributaries
  - left: Dourados River, Perdizes River, Bagagem River, Araguari River, Tijuco River, São Domingos River
  - right: Verde River, São Marcos River, Veríssimo River, Corumbá River, Piracanjuba River, Meia Ponte River, Dos Bois River, Preto River, Alegre River, Claro River, Verde River, Corrente River, Aporé River

The Paranaíba River is a Brazilian river whose source lies in the state of Minas Gerais in the Mata da Corda mountains, municipality of Rio Paranaíba, at an altitude of 1,148 meters; on the other face of this mountain chain are the sources of the Abaeté river, tributary of the São Francisco River. The length of the river is approximately 1,000 kilometres (620 mi) up to the junction with the Grande River, both of which then form the Paraná River, at the point that marks the borders of the states of São Paulo, Minas Gerais, and Mato Grosso do Sul.

== Geography ==
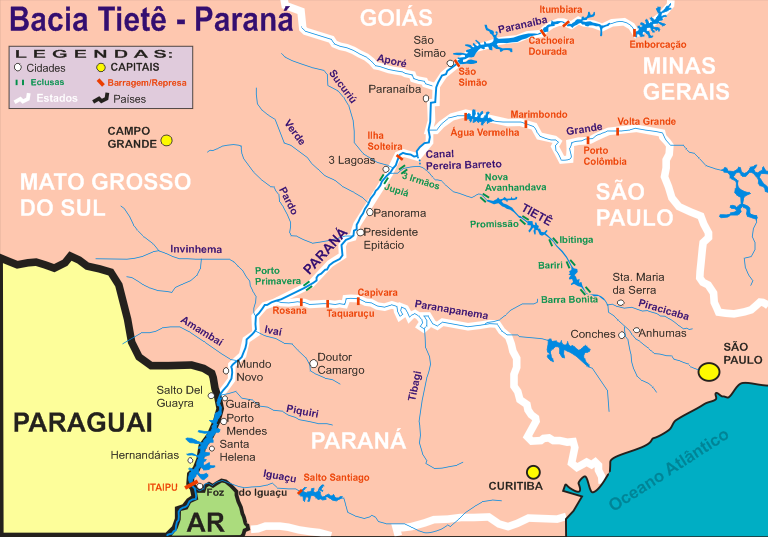
Map of the basin of the high Brazilian Paraná, with details of the source rivers and tributaries

The main tributaries of the Paranaíba are the São Marcos, the Corumbá, the Meia Ponte, and the Bois. Major dams on its course are the Barragem de Emborcação, Barragem Itumbiara and Barragem de São Simão. Cachoeira Dourada near Itumbiara is one of the most important hydroelectric power stations in Brazil, providing energy to Goiânia and Brasília.

The Paranaíba is navigable only in the artificial lake of Ilha Solteira with an extension of 180 km as far as the dam of São Simão.

Because of the great pressure to use its resources it shows serious environmental problems.

In addition to the erosion of its banks caused by sand extraction and cutting down of the original forest growth, practically 100% of the towns that form its basin dump their sewage "in natura", including the capital of Goiânia, which dumps 95% of its sewage, untreated, directly into the Meia Ponte river, which then flows into the Paranaíba.

The Paranaíba river is the most important source of the Paraná river, her source lies in the serra (mountains) of Mata da Corda, municipality "Rio Paranaiba" (Mato Grosso) at a height of 1,148 metres (3,766 ft). On the other side of these serra is the source of the Abaete, a tributary of the São Francisco. The confluence of the Paranaíba with the Grande river is situated about 1,000 kilometres (620 mi) from the source of the Paranaíba. At the union there is a bridge that is also a border point between three states: São Paulo, Minas Gerais and Mato Grosso do Sul. The Paranaíba river is famous for the rich diamond deposits of her tributaries and her huge hydroelectric potential.

The Paranaíba may best be studied in three separate parts, the high-, the middle- and the lower Paranaiba.

=== The high Paranaíba ===
NB: of each segment the start km-point (and counting down) beginning with 1,070, the length, the slope etc. will be mentioned. From its headwaters at 1,000 km, a length of 370 km, to km 700, runs with a northerly orientation through the whole extent of the region Minas Gerais at an average height of 760 m, with a slope of 25 cm/km, goes through the town Patos of Minas at a height of 770 m, obtains water from a number of small tributaries that descend from the Magalhães-peak and from the Serra of Barbaça, on the other side of the Serra da Mata da Corda.

At a height of km 729, at a bridge, she receives the water of a small river, the Verde river, close to the place Contendas (Goias) and bends under the bridge perpendicularly to the southeast and takes the border between Minas and Goias. Between km 700 and 800 the slope is 50 cm/km, running in a valley of average width, with broken strictures between km 730 and 732 and between km 783 and 790. The terrains along the river are rolling smoothly and are poorly cultivated.

=== Middle Paranaíba ===
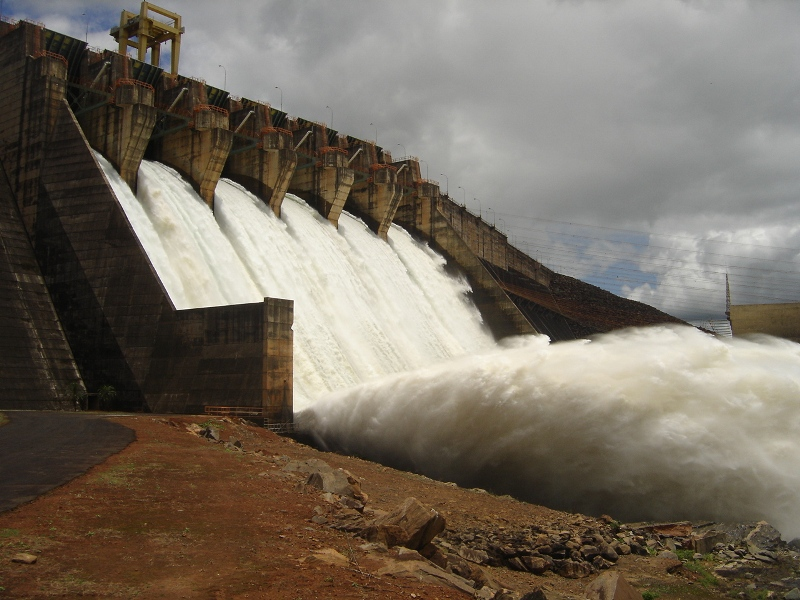
hydro-electrische centrale van Itumbiara, in Anapora-MG

From km 700 to the reservoir of the Dourada (km 330, with a length of 370 km). Between km 575 and 700 the Paranaíba receives the following tributaries: At km 661, right bank the São Marcos, at km 633, left bank, the Perdizes river, at km 596, right bank, the Bagagem river. In this segment the river has a slope of 1.2 m/km in a region with generally narrow valleys, steeply sloping banks, rising up to 25 and 60 m. The tributaries of this segment cross diamond containing layers in the "zones of the triangle" Minas Gerais and Goias.

Between km 313 and 575 the Paranaíba receives the water of the following tributaries: On the right bank the Verissimo. And the Corumba river (km 436) and the Santa Maria river. And on the right side the Jordao river, the Araguari river (km 469) and the small river Piedade. This stretch has a slope of 50 cm/km and runs through the cities Itumbiara (km 392) and Anhanguera (km 535), both in the territory of Goias, and through the city of Araporã (km 392) in the mine region. In this segment the Itumbiara Dam, situated in the municipality of gemeente Araporã, belonging to the Furnas Centrais Elétricas, operating since 1981 with a power of 2.800MW, being the most power generating hydro-station of the Furnas complex, of the state Minas Gerais and of the Paranaiba river.

The river presents a relatively wide bed, cultivated for 20% to 50% of the area and at km 400 starts to run on the well known extensive basalt plate of the Paraná River.

=== The low Paranaíba ===
From the reservoir of the waterfall Dourada up to the unison with the Grande river, with 330 km length. Between km 199 and 330 there is a slope of 33 cm/km. At the limit of this stretch, using the readily available energy, a hydroelectric power station "of the waterfall Dourado" was built. This station used to belong to Centrais Elétricas de Goias (CELG), was privatised and now belongs to "Empresa Endesa Cachoeira" with a generator of 658,000 kW and a waterfall of 19 m providing energy to CELG. Her reservoir takes up about 78 km of the middle Paranaíba. On the stretch from here to km 195 we find the so-called canal of São Simão (Simon), a narrow canal cut out of the basalt, 23 km long and 35 m deep situated on the border of Minas en Goias. In this stretch we find the São Simão Dam, operating with a power of 2.680MW At 3 km higher up from the bridge in Highway BR-31 the Paranaíba, now 3,500 m wide, rushes into a canal 300 m wide that further downstream is narrowed to scarcely 80 m, creating a high turbulence and speed. The river is navigable from the dam of the island Solteira over a length of 180 km up to the dam of São Simão. As with the Grande river, there are problems increasing the navigability, such as high falls, rapids etc. In any case it would be very interesting to have navigability into the central region of Brazil, including into the federal capital Brazilia.

== History ==
=== São Simão Channel ===
One of the greatest ecological losses in Brazil was the disappearance of the Sâo Simão Channel (Canal de São Simão) located on the lower stretch of the river. It was a narrow gorge cut into the basalt, with 23 kilometers length and 35 meters depth, situated on the boundary of the states of Minas and Goiás. The waters of the river, after dividing into two parallel arms, returned to a common bed, forming a corridor of waterfalls. Today this spectacle no longer exists. The building of the São Simão Dam, with the need to increase the capacity of power of the hydroelectric power station, has created a huge lake whose waters have covered the channel.
