= São Bartolomeu River =

River in Brazil

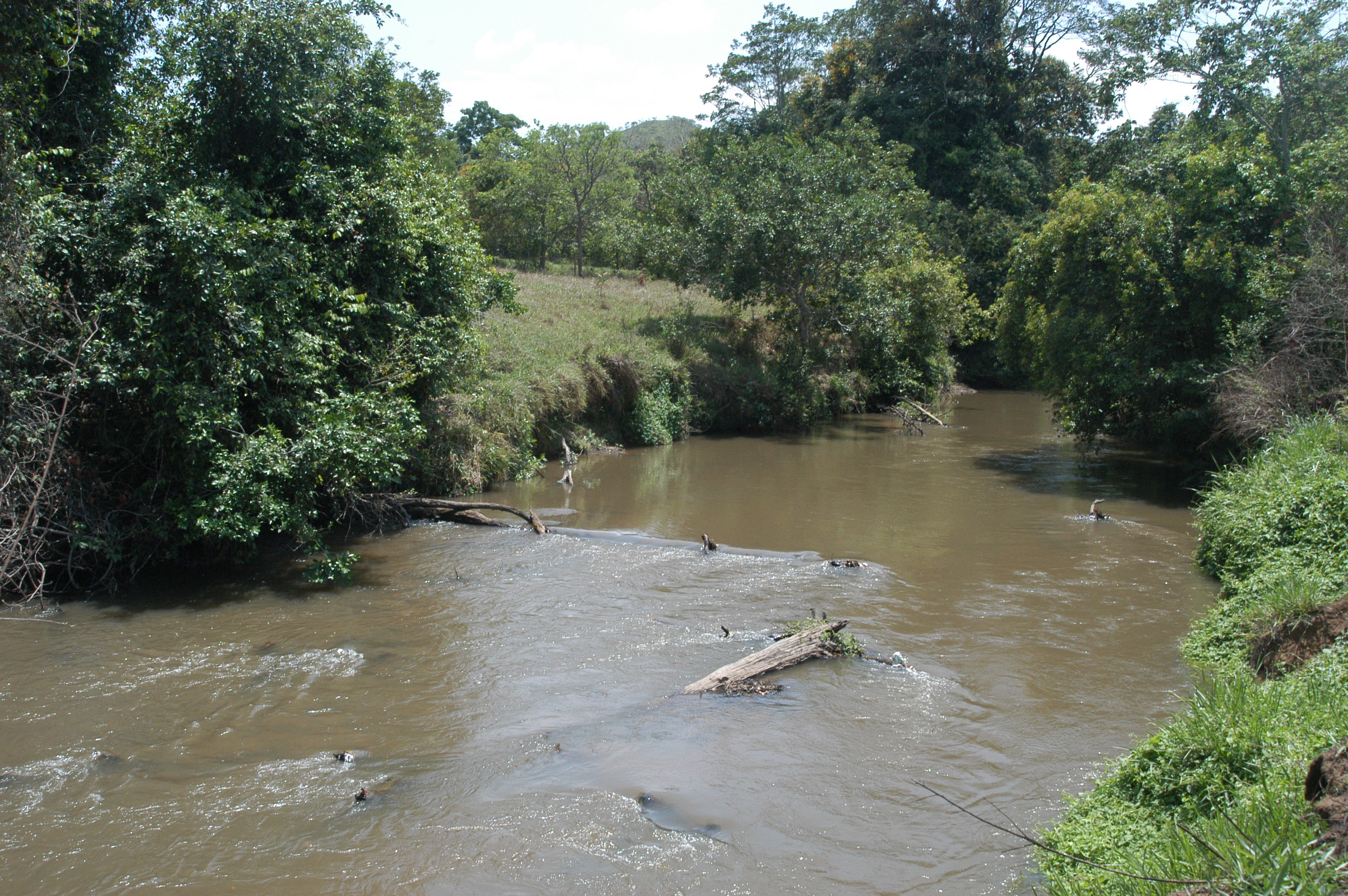

Location
- Country: Brazil

Physical characteristics
- Source
  - location: Goiás state
- Mouth: Corumbá River
  - coordinates: 16°48′S 47°54′W

The São Bartolomeu River is a river of Goiás state in central Brazil.

== See also ==
- List of rivers of Goiás
