= Preto River (Paracatu River tributary) =

Black River
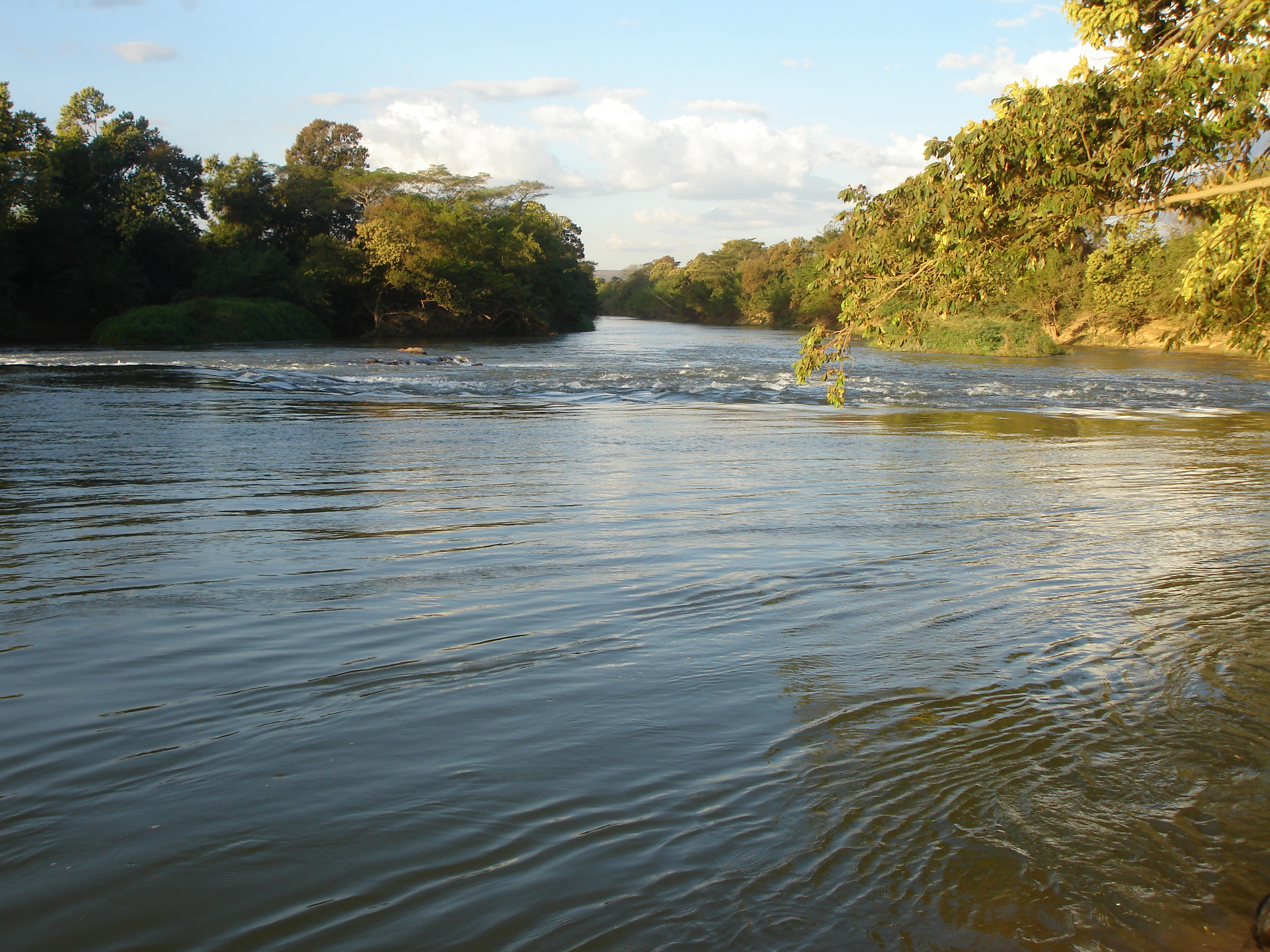
- The river at Unaí, Minas Gerais.

Location
- Country: Brazil

Physical characteristics
- Source
  - location: Lagoa Feia (Goiás)
- Mouth: Paracatu River
  - coordinates: 16°58′S 46°12′W

Basin features
- River system: São Francisco River

The Preto River is a river of Goiás state in central Brazil. It is a tributary of the Paracatu River. It forms the Federal District (Brasilia's) eastern boundary with Goiás and a short stretch with Minas Gerais.

The area was inhabited by indigenous people who called it Hunay which means "dark water" or "black river" due to the color of the river. The term Hunay is also the origin of the name of the municipality of Unaí, in Minas Gerais.

== See also ==
- List of rivers of Goiás
