= Meia Ponte River =

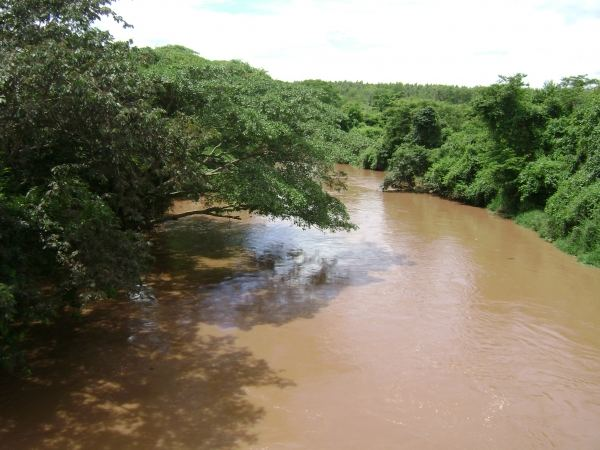

Location
- Country: Brazil
- State: Goiás

Physical characteristics
- Source
  - location: 60 km (37 mi) north of Goiânia
- Mouth: Paranaíba River
  - coordinates: 18°32′39″S 49°35′48″W

The Meia Ponte River (Portuguese, Rio Meia Ponte) is one of the most important rivers in the state of Goiás, Brazil. Its source lies 60 km north of the city of Goiânia and it flows through that city in a southern direction joining the Paranaíba River just downriver of Cachoeira Dourada Dam. The Paranaíba River marks the border between the states of Goiás and Minas Gerais. The Meia Ponte's basin furnishes water for 2 million people, fifty percent of the population of the state, and a large part of the economy depends on it.

The Meia Ponte receives great amounts of garbage, industrial waste, and untreated sewage greatly reducing the quality of its waters. The city of Goiânia dumps over 90% of its untreated sewage into the river.

A preliminary evaluation of water quality downstream from Goiânia indicates that the river has a stretch of 60 kilometers below Goiânia with low levels of dissolved oxygen and therefore a limited capacity to sustain aquatic life or provide conditions for agricultural activity.

In addition, the dry summers last up to six months, which means that the Meia Ponte cannot supply all the population that depends on its water. Rationing in the summer is common. Recently a project was initiated to try to recover this important river and a sewage treatment plant is under construction in Goiânia.

== See also ==
- Tributaries of the Río de la Plata
