= Das Almas River (Goiás) =

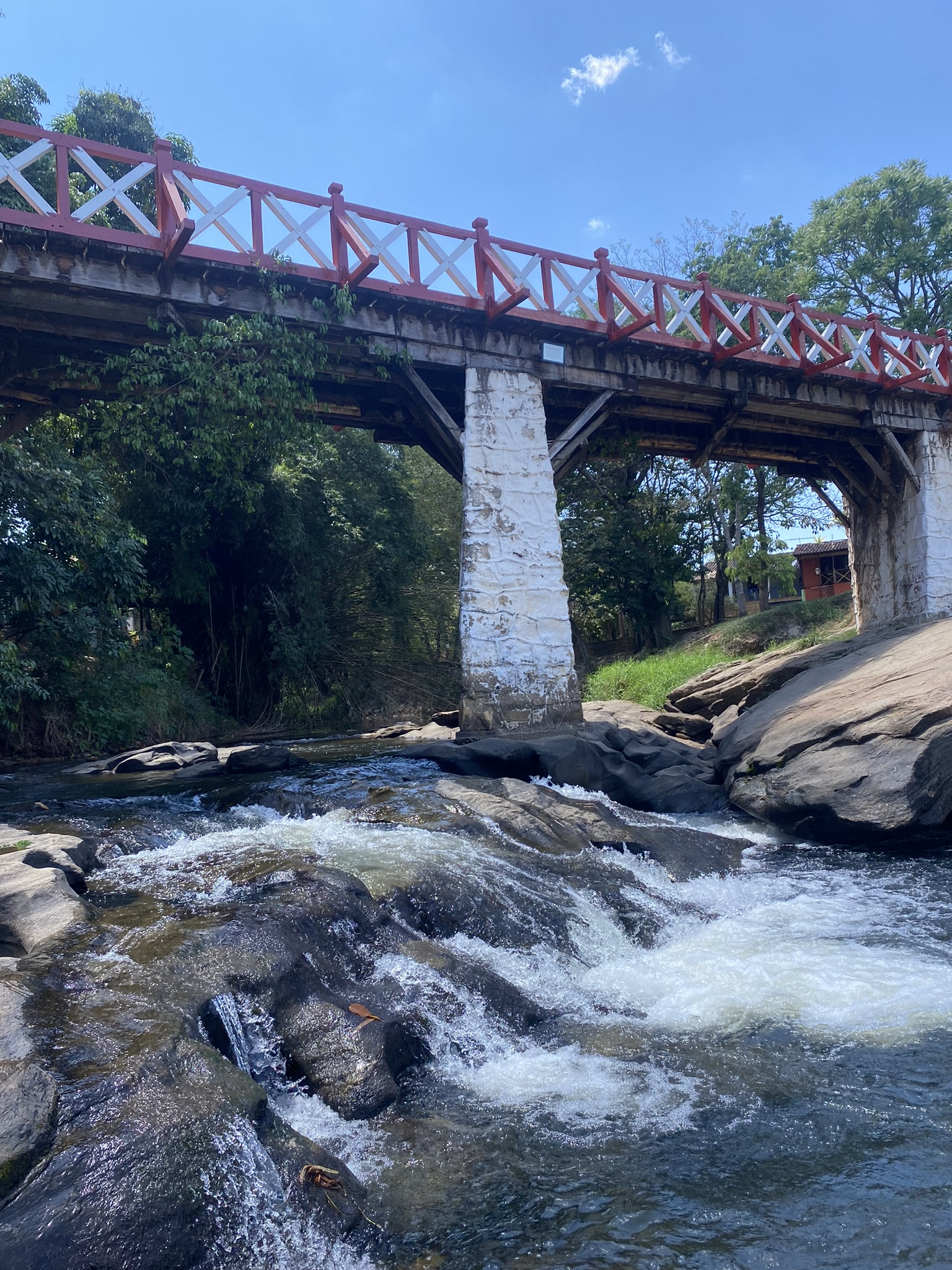

Location
- Country: Brazil

Physical characteristics
- Source
  - location: Goiás state
- Mouth: Maranhão River
  - coordinates: 14°35′S 49°2′W

The Das Almas River is a river of Goiás state in central Brazil.

== See also ==
- List of rivers of Goiás
