= Paranã River (Tocantins River tributary) =

River in the Goiás and Tocantins states, Brazil

Coordinates: 15°30′S 47°11′W

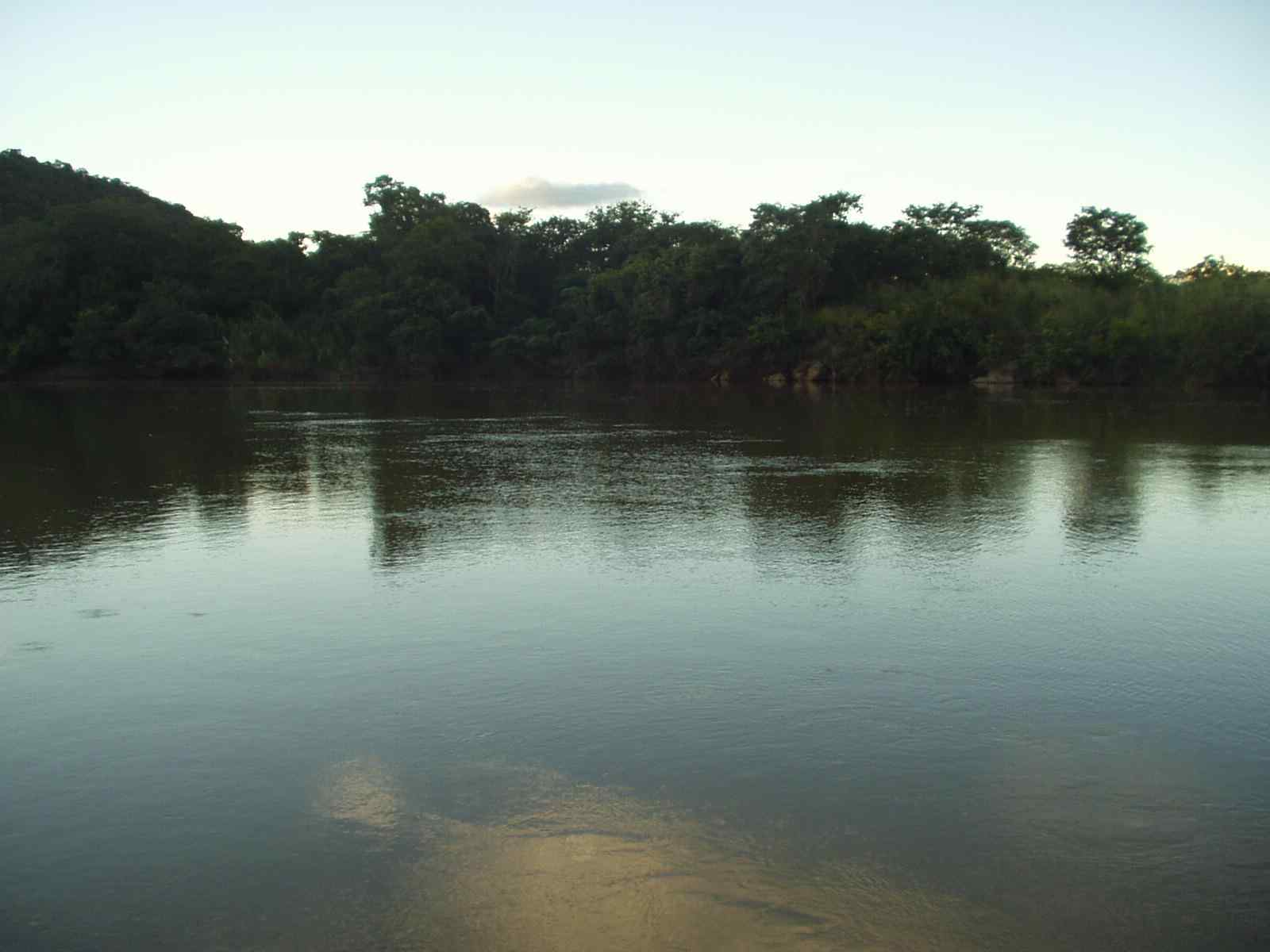

Location
- Country: Brazil
- State: Goiás, Tocantins

Physical characteristics
- Mouth: Tocantins River
- Length: 530 km (330 mi)

The Paranã River is located in the Goiás and Tocantins states, Brazil. It divides two regions – the Northeast and north-central Goiás. It is formed by tributaries that descend the Serra Geral, the mountains that divide eastern Goiás and Bahia. One of the most important tributaries is the Crixás, which has its source near Formosa. Farther to the north the Paranã becomes the main tributary of the Tocantins River on the right bank. Today it is crossed by a long concrete bridge between the municipalities of Iaciara and Nova Roma. It forms the valley which makes up a vast region called the Vão do Paranã Microregion.

== See also ==
- List of rivers of Goiás
- List of rivers of Tocantins
