= Crixás Açu River =

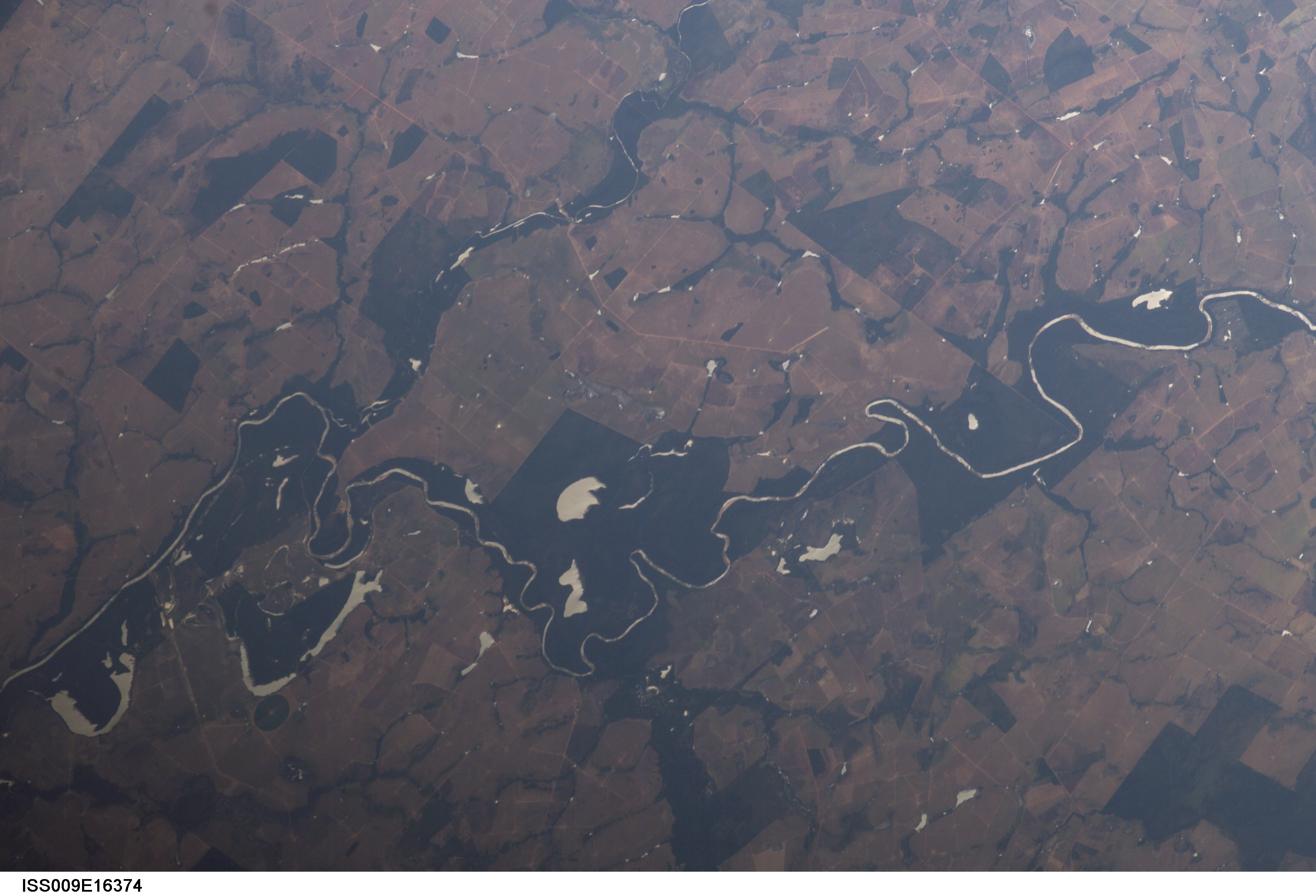

Location
- Country: Brazil
- State: Goiás

Physical characteristics
- Mouth: Araguaia River
  - coordinates: 3°19′22″S 50°36′43″W
- Length: 400 km (250 mi)

The Crixás Açu River is a river of Goiás state in central Brazil.

== See also ==
- List of rivers of Goiás
