= Maranhão River =

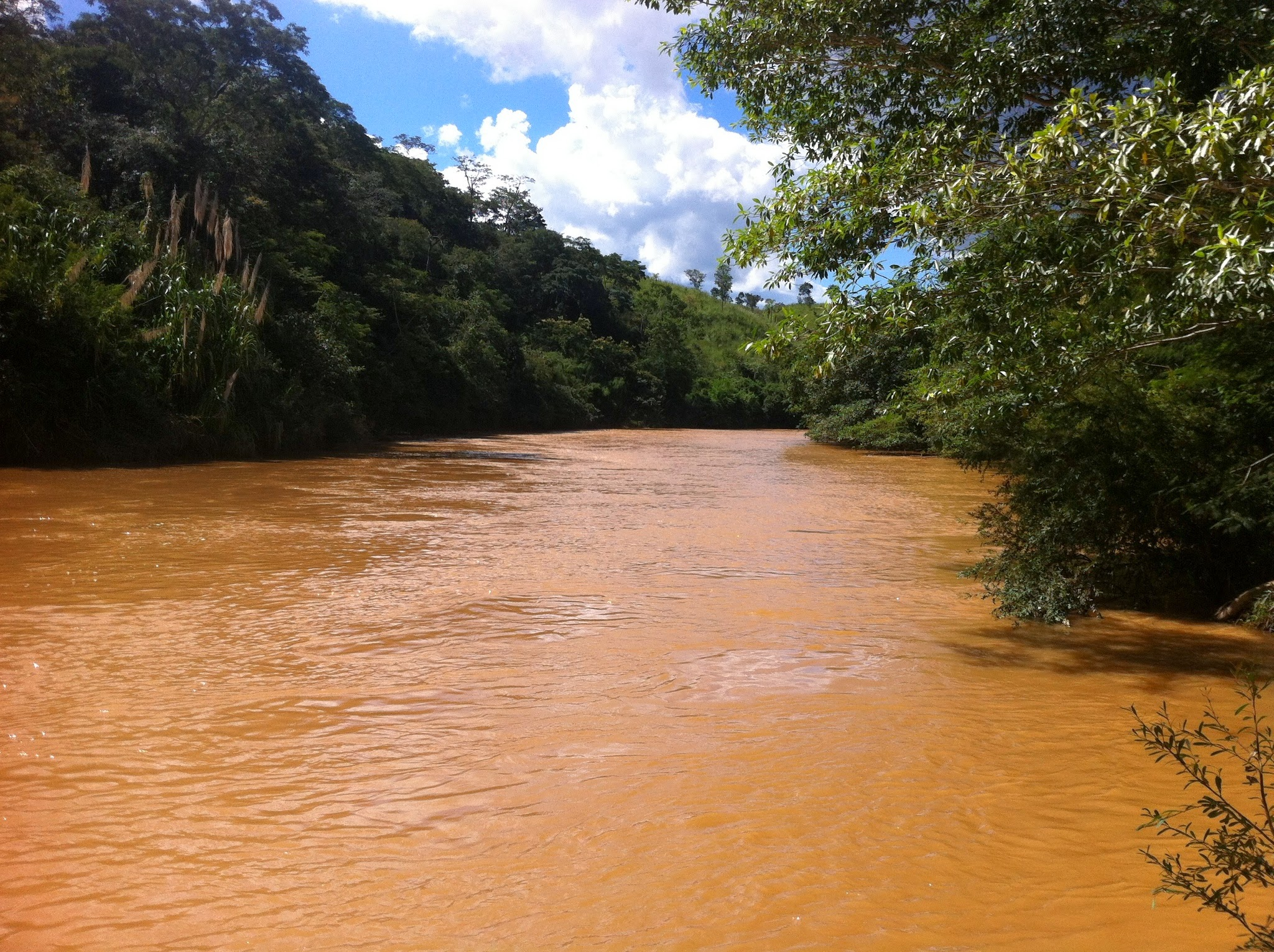
- Native name: Rio Maranhão (Portuguese)

Location
- Country: Brazil
- State: Goiás

Physical characteristics
- Mouth: Tocantins River
  - coordinates: 14°0′S 48°24′W
- Length: 420 km (260 mi)

Basin features
- River system: Tocantins basin

The Maranhão River is a river of Goiás state in central Brazil.

== See also ==
- List of rivers of Goiás
