= Corumbá River =

River in Brazil

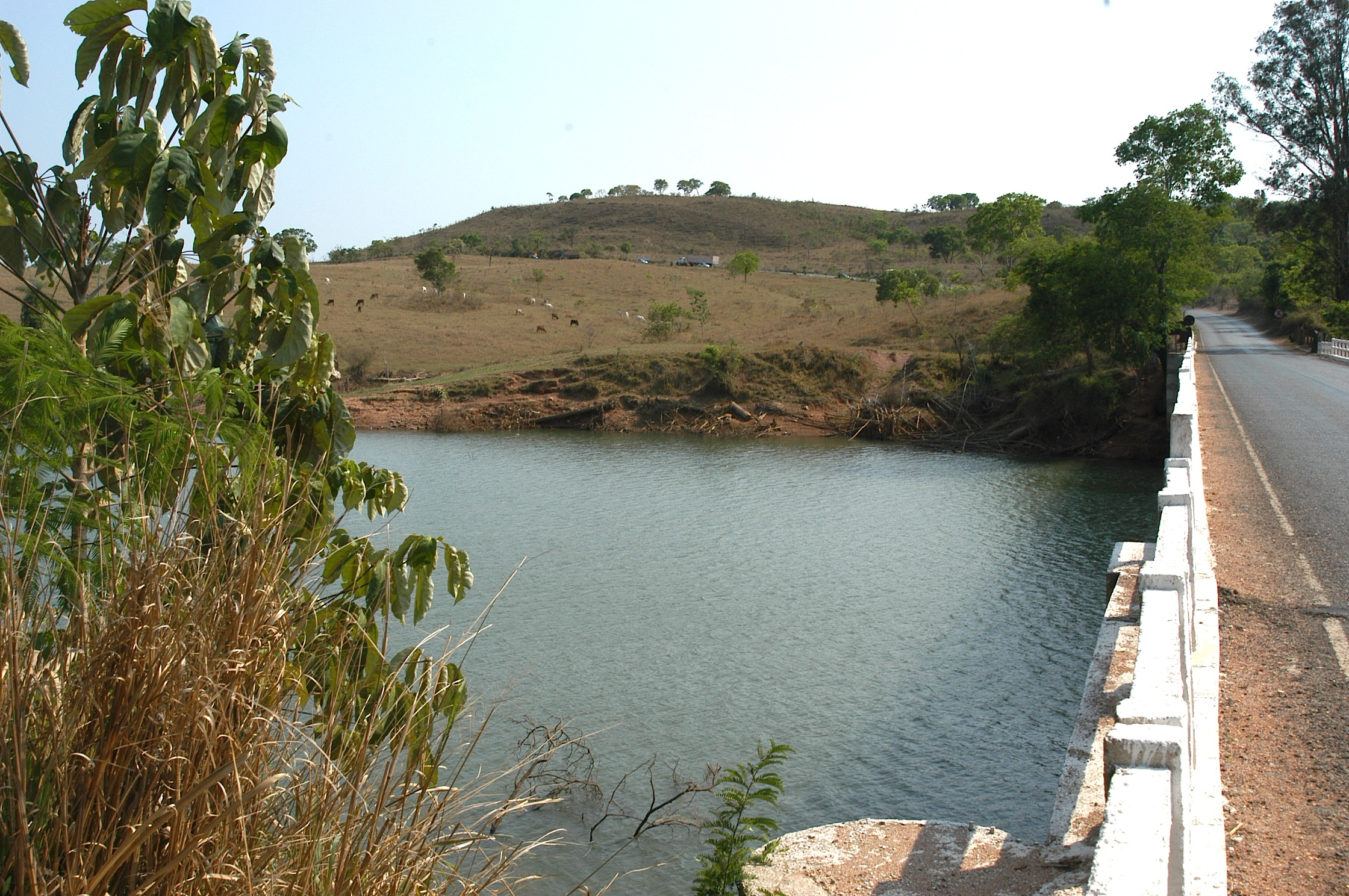
- The Corumbá River
- Native name: Rio Corumbá (Portuguese)

Location
- Country: Brazil
- State: Goiás

Physical characteristics
- Source: Montes de Pireneus
  - location: near Pirenópolis
- Mouth: Itumbiara Reservoir (Paranaíba River)
  - location: Itumbiara
  - coordinates: 18.2436°S 48.7833°W
- Length: 567 km (352 mi)

Basin features
- River system: Río de la Plata

The Corumbá River (Rio Corumbá in Portuguese) is the most important river in the Central Plateau region of Brazil. Its source is in the Montes de Pireneus, near Pirenópolis, state of Goiás, near the boundary with the Federal District and its length is 567 km. It receives the waters of the Descoberto and São Bartolomeu, which begin in the Federal District. There are plans to build a hydroelectric plant on this section of the river.

The Corumbá flows south from its source near Corumbá de Goiás, where there are spectacular waterfalls, is crossed by a major bridge on the Brasília-Goiânia highway east of Alexânia, passing near Pires do Rio and Caldas Novas. To the south it enters the Itumbiara Reservoir, the lake created by the Itumbiara Dam on the Paranaíba River, one of the main tributaries of the Paraná River.

Near Caldas Novas the Corumbá is dammed and forms a large reservoir called Corumbá Lake.

The Corumbá receives untreated sewage from several cities in Goiás. Its banks suffer the consequences of removal of sand and gravel in several points (in Luziânia sand was removed to build Brasília). The loss of the natural forest and agricultural activity are responsible for negative impact on all the course of the river.
