= Urutaí =

- Municipality
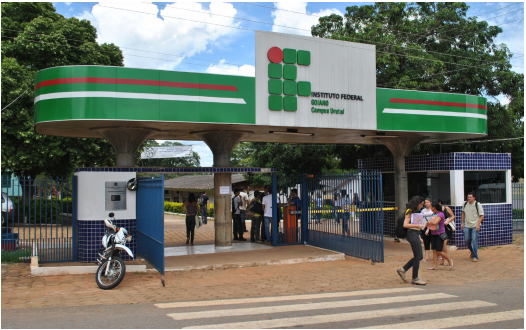

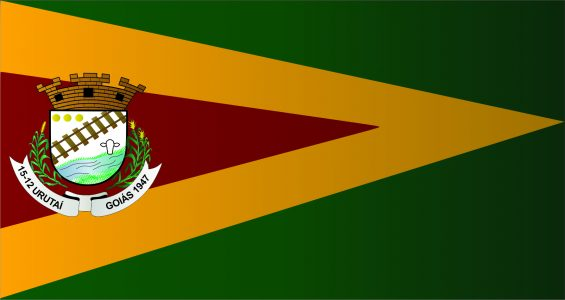
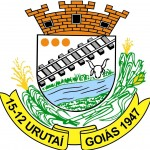
- Flag Coat of arms

- Location in Goiás state

- Location in Brazil
- Coordinates: 17°28′06″S 48°11′42″W
- Country: Brazil
- Region: Central-West
- State: Goiás
- Microregion: Pires do Rio Microregion

Area
  - Total: 626.7 km^{2} (242.0 sq mi)
- Elevation: 807 m (2,648 ft)

Population (2020)
  - Total: 3,066
  - Density: 4.892/km^{2} (12.67/sq mi)
- Time zone: UTC−3 (BRT)
- Postal code: 75790-000

Urutaí is a municipality in southeast Goiás state, Brazil. It is a major producer of poultry products.

== Location ==
Urutaí is located 163 kilometers from the state capital, Goiânia. Highway connections are made by BR-352 / Bela Vista de Goiás / Cristianópolis / BR-352 / G-020 / Santa Cruz de Goiás / Palmelo. See Sepin for all the distances.

In the north it borders Pires do Rio and Orizona; in the south and the east it borders Ipameri; and in the east it borders Pires do Rio. The elevation is between 654 and 988 meters with the municipal seat lying at 807 meters.

== Political information ==
- Mayor: Ésio Bento Lemos do Prado (January 2005)
- City council: 09 members
- Eligible voters: 2,535 (December/2007)

== Demographics ==
- Population density: 4.35 inhabitants/km^{2} (2007)
- Population in 1980: 3,138
- Population in 2007: 2,727
- Urban population: 2,212 (2007)
- Rural population: 515 (2007)
- Population growth rate: -0.46% 1996/2007

== The economy ==
The economy is based on subsistence agriculture, cattle raising, services, public administration, and small transformation industries.

- Industrial units: 2 (2007)
- Commercial units: 29 (2007)
- Financial institutions: - Banco Itaú S.A.
- Cattle herd: 49,200 head (9,000 milk cows) (2006)
- Poultry: 2,000,000 head (2006)
- Main crops: pineapple, rice, bananas, coffee, sugarcane, beans, manioc, corn, and soybeans.

Agricultural data 2006

- Number of farms: 363
- Total area: 38,412 ha.
- Area of permanent crops: 158 ha.
- Area of perennial crops: 2,055 ha.
- Area of natural pasture: 26,830 ha.
- Area of woodland and forests: 8,363 ha.
- Persons dependent on farming: 760
- Farms with tractors: 52
- Number of tractors: 81
- Cattle herd: 49,200 head IBGE

== Education (2006) ==
- Schools: 4
- Classrooms: 65
- Teachers: 86
- Students: 1,559
- Higher education: Instituto Federal Goiano-IFGOIANO
- Adult literacy rate: 88.3% (2000) (national average was 86.4%)

== Health (2007) ==
- Hospitals: 0
- Hospital beds: 0
- Ambulatory clinics: 1
- Infant mortality rate: 24.45 (2000) (national average was 33.0).

== History ==
Urutaí is a town that appeared with the coming of the railroad in 1914. At first houses were built around the railroad station to house workers and soon this settlement grew. In 1947 the town separated from Ipameri to become a municipality.

Municipal Human Development Index

- MHDI: 0.760
- State ranking: 54 (out of 242 municipalities in 2000)
- National ranking: 1,590 (out of 5,507 municipalities in 2000) For a complete list see Frigoletto.com

== See also ==
- List of municipalities in Goiás
- Microregions of Goiás
