= Microregion of Pires do Rio =

Coordinates: 17°18′03″S 48°16′48″W

Pires do Rio
- Microregion
- Location in Goias state
- Country: Brazil
- State: Goiás
- Mesoregion: Sul Goiano
- Municipalities: 10

Area
  - Total: 9,450 km^{2} (3,650 sq mi)

Population (2007)
  - Total: 90,327
  - Density: 9.6/km^{2} (25/sq mi)

The Pires do Rio Microregion is a statistical region of south-central Goiás state, Brazil. The most important city is Pires do Rio. The area includes 10 municipalities with a population of 90,327 (2007) in an area of 9,449.80 km^{2}. The most populous municipality in the region is Pires do Rio with 26,857 inhabitants and the least populous is Palmelo with 2,260 inhabitants. The largest municipality in land area is Silvânia with 2,860.1 km^{2} and the smallest is Palmelo with 59 km^{2}. Palmelo is the smallest municipality in the state of Goiás.

== Municipalities ==
The microregion consists of the following municipalities:

| Name | Population (2007) |
|---|---|
| Cristianópolis | 3,041 |
| Gameleira de Goiás | 2,782 |
| Orizona | 13.440 |
| Palmelo | 2,426 |
| Pires do Rio | 28,796 |
| Santa Cruz de Goiás | 3,601 |
| São Miguel do Passa Quatro | 3,895 |
| Silvânia | 19,022 |
| Urutaí | 2,727 |
| Vianópolis | 12,187 |

== See also ==
- List of municipalities in Goiás
- Microregions of Goiás
