= Gameleira de Goiás =

- Municipality
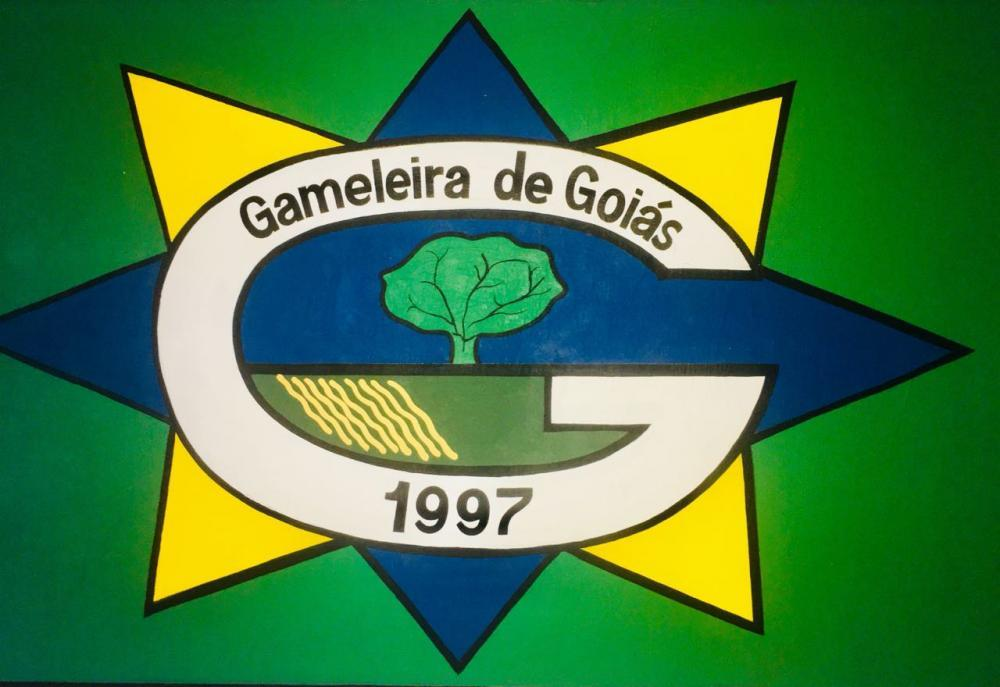
- Flag

- Location in Goiás state

- Location in Brazil
- Coordinates: 16°28′07″S 48°37′55″W
- Country: Brazil
- Region: Central-West
- State: Goiás
- Microregion: Pires do Rio Microregion

Area
  - Total: 595.3 km^{2} (229.8 sq mi)
- Elevation: 993 m (3,258 ft)

Population (2020)
  - Total: 3,880
  - Density: 6.52/km^{2} (16.9/sq mi)
- Time zone: UTC−3 (BRT)
- Postal code: 75184-000 até 75219-000

Gameleira de Goiás is a municipality in central Goiás state, Brazil. The population in 2020 was 3,880 in a total area of 595 square kilometers.

== Geographical Information ==
The distance to the state capital, Goiânia, is 99 km. Highway connections from Goiânia are made by BR-457 / GO-010 / Bonfinópolis / Leopoldo de Bulhões / Silvânia / GO-437. (18 km unpaved).

Gameleira has municipal boundaries with Silvânia, Abadiânia, and Anápolis.

=== Political Data ===
- Eligible voters: 2,399 (December 2007)
- Mayor: José Denisson de Sousa (January 2005)
- Vice-mayor: Marizete Coelho Borges
- Councilmembers: 09

=== Demographics ===
- Population density in 2007: 5.52 inhabitants/km^{2}
- Population growth rate 1996/2007: n/a
- Total population in 2007: 3,289
- Total population in 1980: n/a
- Urban population in 2007: 1,005
- Rural population in 2007: 2,284

=== The Economy ===
The main economic activities are livestock raising, agriculture, and services.

Economic Data

- Industrial units: 02 (June/2007)
- Retail units: 25 (August/2007)
- Banking institutions: none (2007)
- Motor vehicles: 156 automobiles and 153 pickup trucks. (IBGE 2007)
- Number of inhabitants per motor vehicle: 10.6

Agriculture

Agriculture is based on cattle raising and growing of corn, sugarcane, rice, and soybeans.

In 2004 the cattle herd was 20,250 head, of which 6,000 were milking cows. The main agricultural products in planted area were soybeans (25,000 hectares), corn (1,200 hectares), beans, sorghum, tomatoes, and citrus fruits.

- Number of farms, total area and workers: 529 on 61,520 ha. with 1,300 workers.
- Land distribution: 32,000 ha. were planted in permanent or perennial crops and 19,511 ha. were natural pasture. 91 farms had a total of 222 tractors (2006).

=== Education and Health ===
- Literacy rate: n/a
- Infant mortality rate: n/a
- Schools: 03 (2006)
- Students: 833
- Hospitals: 0 (July 2003)
- Hospital beds: 0
- Walk-in public health clinics: 01

== See also ==
- List of municipalities in Goiás
- Microregions of Goiás
