= Palmelo =

- Municipality
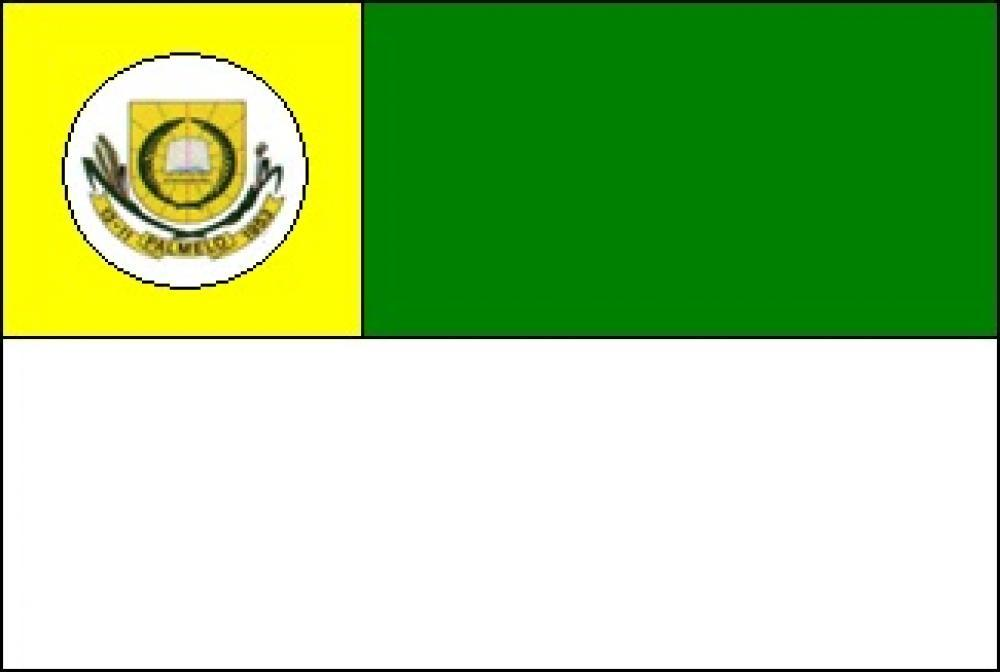
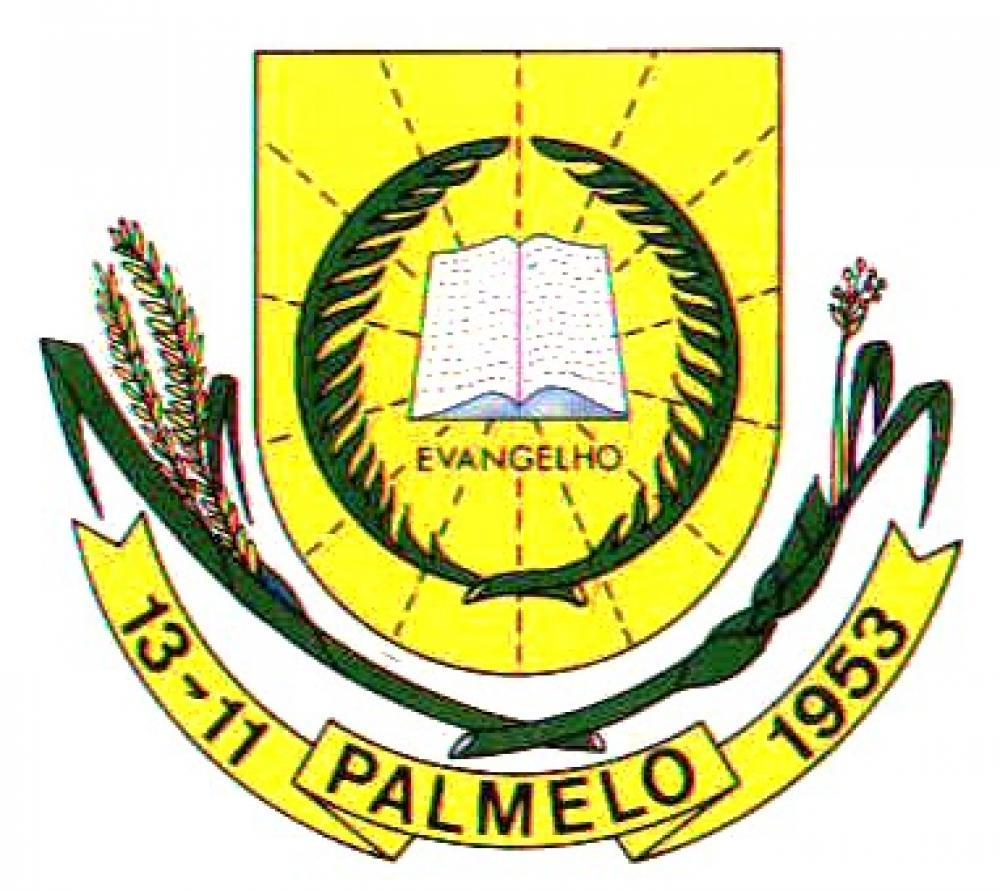
- Flag Coat of arms

- Location in Goiás state

- Location in Brazil
- Coordinates: 17°19′30″S 48°25′20″W
- Country: Brazil
- Region: Central-West
- State: Goiás
- Microregion: Pires do Rio Microregion

Area
  - Total: 58.9 km^{2} (22.7 sq mi)
- Elevation: 754 m (2,474 ft)

Population (2020)
  - Total: 2,381
  - Density: 40.4/km^{2} (105/sq mi)
- Time zone: UTC−3 (BRT)
- Postal code: 75210-000

Palmelo is municipality in southeast Goiás state, Brazil. It is the smallest municipality in the state and the only town in Brazil where most of the inhabitants follow the religion called Spiritism.

== Location ==
The distance to the state capital, Goiânia, is 128 km. Highway connections are made by BR-352 / Bela Vista de Goiás / Cristianópolis / BR-352 / GO-020 / Santa Cruz de Goiás. Source: Sepin

The municipality is bounded on north, south, and east by Pires do Rio and on the west by Santa Cruz de Goiás. It is crossed by the Ribeirão Caiapó and its tributaries: Ribeirão São Jerônimo and Ribeirão Monjolinho, which flow into the Corumbá River.

== History ==
The city was founded on February 9, 1929, when a group of 18 people founded a Spiritist center called Luz da Verdade. These people had converted to Spiritism after seeing the alleged cure of a medium, Dorcelino Damásio da Silva, who had suffered from a disease called fogo selvagem. In 1953 Palmelo became a municipality separating from Pires do Rio. It is probably the only town in Brazil and in the world where most of the inhabitants are Spiritists.

== Climate ==
The climate is moist tropical, with two well defined seasons: summer and winter. The summer is very rainy while the winter is very dry. The temperature varies between 16 °C and 26 °C.

== Political Information ==
In January 2005 the Mayor was Geraldo Afonso Leite. The city council had 9 members and there were 1,842 eligible voters in December 2007.

== Demographic Information ==
In 2007 the population density was 38.32 inhabitants/km^{2}. In 2007 there were 2,088 people living in the urban area and 172 living in the rural area. The population has increased by about 600 people since the first census in 1980.

== Economy ==
The main economic activity is cattle raising, both for meat and milk and the region also produces a lot of clay for brick making. In 2006 there was a dairy—Centrolac Indústria e Comércio Ltda—and 3 small industrial units. There were 22 commercial units.

In 2007 there were 2,500 head of cattle. The main agricultural products were oranges, manioc, and corn. All were of modest production due to the small area of the municipality.

Agricultural data 2006

- Number of farms: 63
- Total area: 1,161 ha.
- Area of permanent crops: 22 ha.
- Area of perennial crops: 61 ha.
- Area of natural pasture: 862 ha.
- Area of woodland and forests: 176 ha.
- Persons dependent on farming: 110
- Farms with tractors: 12
- Number of tractors: 12
- Cattle herd: 127,000 head IBGE

== Health and education ==
In 2007 there was 1 hospital, with 14 beds and 2 ambulatory health clinics. In 2000 the infant mortality rate was 9.80—much lower than the national average of 33.0 and one of the lowest in the state. It 1990 it had been 40.97.

In 2006 the school system had 3 schools, 17 classrooms, 34 teachers, and 622 students. In 2000 the adult literacy rate was 85.3%--lower than the national average of 86.4%.

Municipal Human Development Index

- MHDI: 0.787
- State ranking: 18 (out of 242 municipalities)
- National ranking: 891 (out of 5,507 municipalities) For the complete list see Frigoletto.com

== Tourism ==
One of popular attractions is Spiritism. People from all over the country also come seeking cures for their illnesses.

== See also ==
- List of municipalities in Goiás
- Microregions of Goiás
