= São Miguel do Passa Quatro =

- Municipality
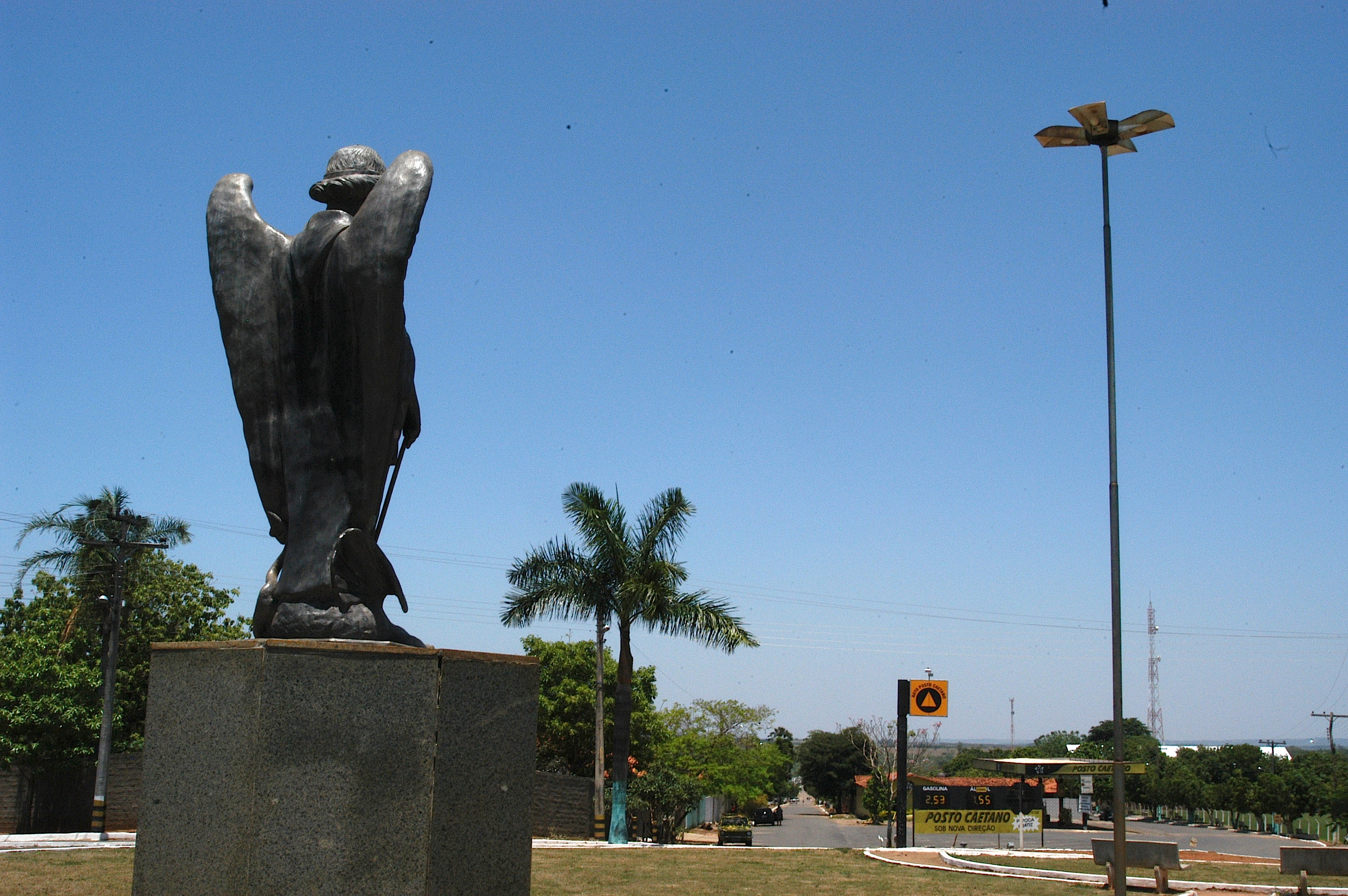

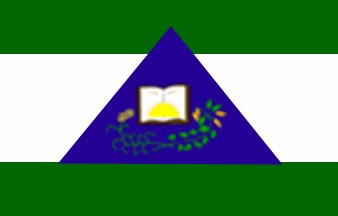
- Flag

- Location in Goiás state

- Location in Brazil
- Coordinates: 17°03′41″S 48°39′15″W
- Country: Brazil
- Region: Central-West
- State: Goiás
- Microregion: Pires do Rio Microregion

Area
  - Total: 537.8 km^{2} (207.6 sq mi)
- Elevation: 801 m (2,628 ft)

Population (2020)
  - Total: 4,082
  - Density: 7.590/km^{2} (19.66/sq mi)
- Time zone: UTC−3 (BRT)
- Postal code: 75185-000

São Miguel do Passa Quatro is a municipality in central Goiás state, Brazil.

== Location ==
São Miguel is located in the Pires do Rio Microregion, at a distance of 112 kilometers from the state capital of Goiânia. Highway connections from Goiânia are made by BR-352 / Bela Vista de Goiás / Cristianópolis / GO-139. See Sepin for all the distances.

It has boundaries with Bela Vista de Goiás, Cristianópolis, Silvânia and Vianópolis.

== Climate ==
The climate is tropical humid with an average annual temperature of 21 °C. From May to October are the lowest temperatures, between 18 °C and 21 °C, with an average minimum of 9 °C to 13 °C. The hottest months, from September to November, register maximum temperatures of 36 °C to 38 °C. The annual rainfall is around 1,400 millimeters. The elevation varies between 600 and 900 meters above sea level.

== Political information ==
- Mayor: Eleusa França de Melo (January 2005-January 2009)
- City council: 09 members
- Eligible voters: 3,033 (December/2007)

== Demographics ==
- Population density: 6.84 inhabitants/km^{2} (2007)
- Urban population: 1,870 (2007)
- Rural population: 1,810 (2007)
- Population growth: a gain of about 1,000 people since 1991

== The economy ==
The economy is based on subsistence agriculture, cattle raising, services, public administration, and small transformation industries.

- Industrial units: 6 (2007)
- Commercial units: 29 (2007)
- Cattle herd: 32,400 head (5,400 milk cows) (2006)
- Main crops: rice, beans, manioc, guava, oranges, tangerines, corn (1,500 hectares), sorghum, tomatoes, and soybeans (11,000 hectares).

Agricultural data 2006

- Number of farms: 524
- Total area: 30,427 ha.
- Area of permanent crops: 90 ha.
- Area of perennial crops: 5,724 ha.
- Area of natural pasture: 16,939 ha.
- Area of woodland and forests: 6,835 ha.
- Persons dependent on farming: 1,300
- Farms with tractors: 69
- Number of tractors: 105
- Cattle herd: 127,000 head IBGE

== Education (2006) ==
- Schools: 5
- Students: 1,040
- Higher education: none
- Adult literacy rate: 90.0% (2000) (national average was 86.4%)

== Health (2007) ==
- Hospitals: 1
- Hospital beds: 20
- Ambulatory clinics: 3
- Infant mortality rate: 19.70 (2000) (national average was 33.0)

Municipal Human Development Index

- MHDI: 0.767
- State ranking: 45 (out of 242 municipalities in 2000)
- National ranking: 1,413 (out of 5,507 municipalities in 2000) For the complete list see Frigoletto.com

== See also ==
- List of municipalities in Goiás
- Microregions of Goiás
