= Pires do Rio =

- Municipality
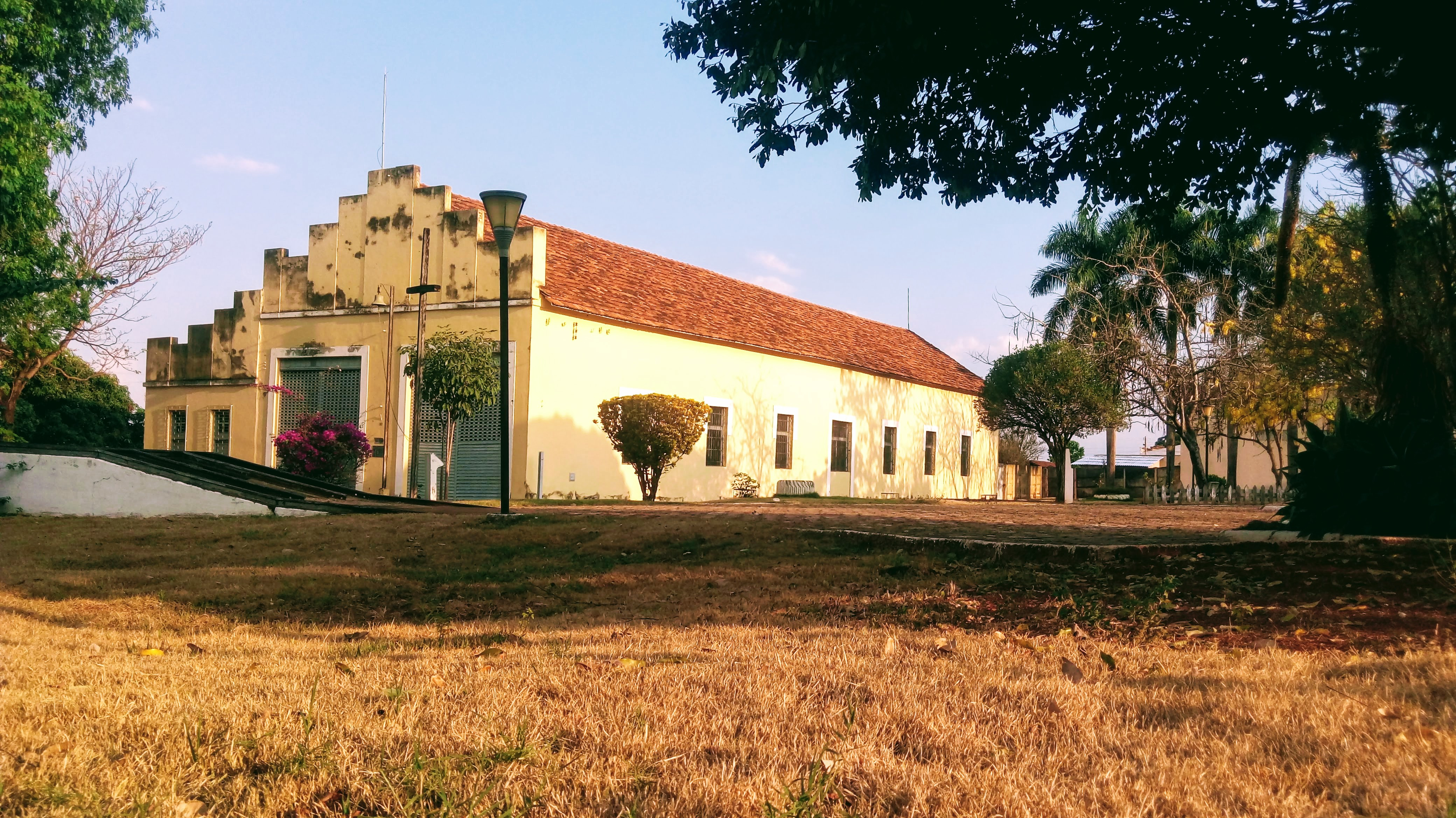

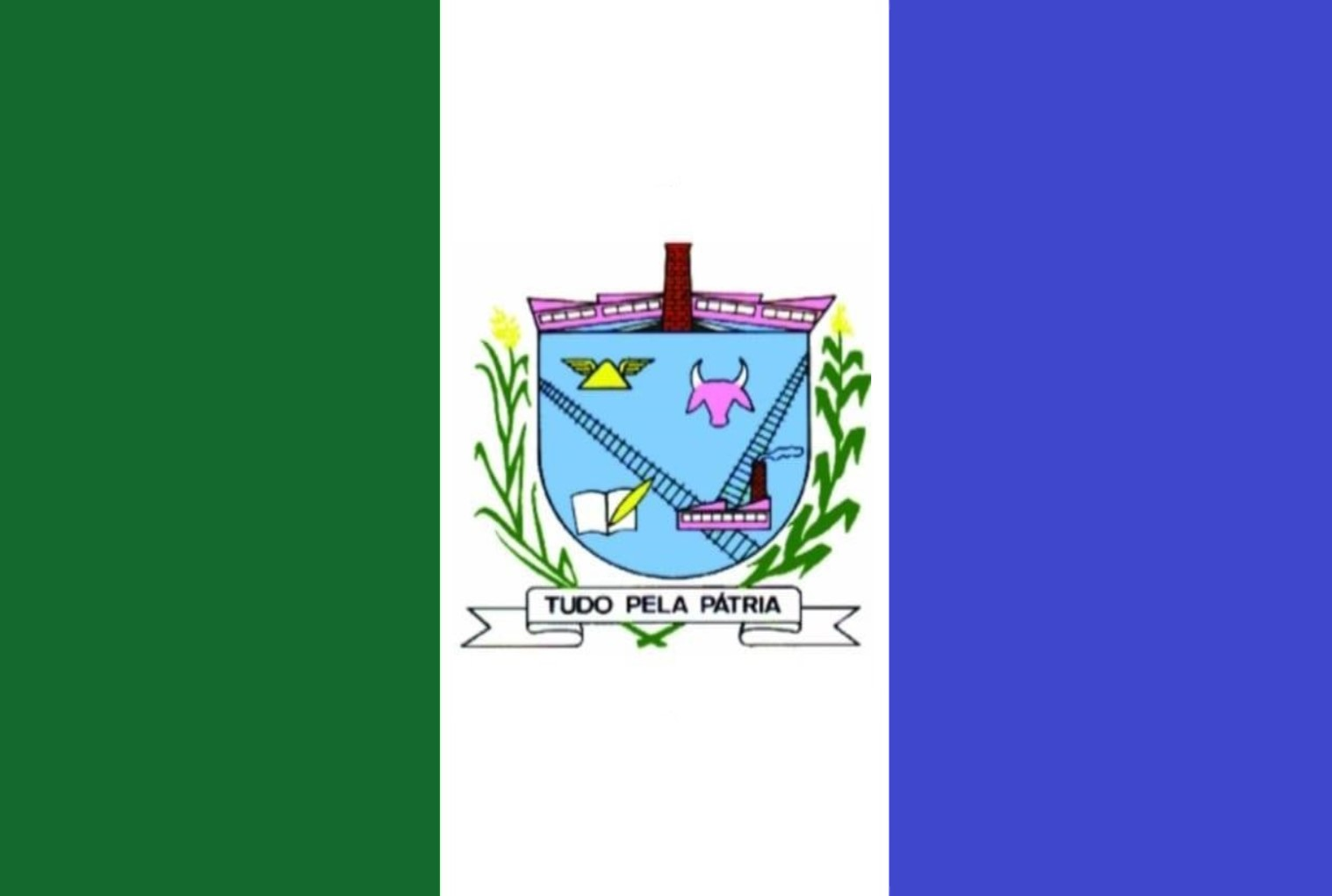
- Flag

- Location in Goiás state

- Location in Brazil
- Coordinates: 17°18′05″S 48°16′48″W
- Country: Brazil
- Region: Central-West
- State: Goiás

Area
  - Total: 10,736 km^{2} (4,145 sq mi)
- Elevation: 758 m (2,487 ft)

Population (2020)
  - Total: 31,686
  - Density: 2.9514/km^{2} (7.6440/sq mi)
- Time zone: UTC−3 (BRT)
- Postal code: 75200-000
- Website: www.piresdorio.go.gov.br

Pires do Rio is a municipality in Goiás state, Brazil. It is a prosperous town and a major producer of poultry.

== Location ==
It is located in the Pires do Rio Microregion. Citybrazil. It is located 144 kilometers from the state capital and is served by highways GO-020, 330 and 414, as well as by several municipal roads. Connections from Goiânia are made by BR-352 / Bela Vista de Goiás / Cristianópolis / BR-352 / G-020 / Santa Cruz de Goiás / Palmelo. Distancias Rodoviarias Sepin

Neighboring municipalities are: Caldas Novas, Cristianópolis, Ipameri, Orizona, Palmelo, Santa Cruz de Goiás, Urutaí and Vianópolis.

Districts, Villages, and Hamlets

- Hamlets: Engenheiro Balduino and Soldado Esteves

== History ==
The city owes its beginnings to the coming of the railroad to Goiás. The railroad company proposed the construction of a railroad station in the region if the lands were made available to start a community. Coronel Lino Teixeira Sampaio, one of the founders of the town, the other one being Balduino Ernesto de Almeida, donated lands from his ranch to build the first houses. An area was reserved for the town and a plan was drawn up. This was never carried out since the residents built their houses outside the area. In 1922 a metal bridge was built over the Rio Corumbá and the settlement began to grow attracting residents from nearby areas. The name, Pires do Rio, was given to the train station and then to the town, in honor of the Minister of Transportation and Public Works of Brazil José Pires do Rio. Source: Sepin.

== Political information ==
- Mayor: Luís Eduardo Pitaluga (January 2009)
- Eligible voters:
- Votes for Mayor in last election:
- Political party:
- City council: 9 members

== Demographics ==
- Population density: 25.02 inhabitants/km^{2} (2007)
- Population in 1980: 19,258
- Population in 2009: 27,928
- Urban population: 25,031(2007)
- Rural population: 1,826 (2007)
- Population growth or loss: a gain of about 9,500 people since 1980

== The economy ==
The economy is based on agriculture, cattle raising, services, public administration, and small transformation industries. The soil also has deposits of clay for the manufacture of roof tiles and bricks.

- Industrial units: 66 (2007)
- Commercial units: 435 (2007)
- Bank agencies: Banco do Brasil S.A. - BRADESCO S.A. - Banco Itaú S.A., (August 2007) - CEF
- Dairy: Indústria e Comércio de Laticínios Pires do Rio Ltda (22/05/2006)
- Meat packing plant: Nutriza Agroindustrial de Alimentos S/A

Motor vehicles

- Automobiles: 4,481
- Pickup trucks: 907
- Number of inhabitants per motor vehicle: 5
- Cattle herd: 85,500 head (2006)
- Poultry: 1,710,500 head (2004)
- Main crops (2005): pineapple, rice, coffee, beans, manioc, soybeans (5,200 hectares), and corn.

== Agricultural data 2006 ==
- Number of farms: 618
- Total area: 78,530 ha.
- Area of permanent crops: 33 ha.
- Area of perennial crops: 4,178 ha.
- Area of natural pasture: 50,542 ha.
- Area of woodland and forests: 22,525 ha.
- Persons dependent on farming: 1,700
- Farms with tractors: 117
- Number of tractors: 182
- Cattle herd: 85,500 head IBGE

== Education (2006) ==
- Schools: 28
- Classrooms: 184
- Teachers: 364
- Students: 7,562
- Higher education: Campus of the State University of Goiás - Faculdade do Sudoeste Goiano- FASUG
- Adult literacy rate: 91.0% (2000) (national average was 86.4%)

== Health (2009) ==
- Hospitals: 1
- Hospital beds: 126
- Ambulatory clinics: 5
- Infant mortality rate: 24.45 (2000) (national average was 33.0).

== Tourism ==
The main attraction of the town is the natural environment of the Cachoeira (Waterfall) do Maratá. It has 70 meters of free fall and is visited for skydiving, camping, and swimming activities. Another tourist point is the old Usina do Salto, an abandoned hydroelectric plant built in 1930. It attracts tourists for camping, kayaking, and innertube floating.

In the town there is a railroad museum, which has several objects from the days when Pires do Rio was on the railroad line.

Municipal Human Development Index

- MHDI: 0.785
- State ranking: 21 (out of 242 municipalities)
- National ranking: 943 (out of 5,507 municipalities)

For the complete list see Frigoletto.com

== See also ==
- List of municipalities in Goiás
- Microregions of Goiás
