= Paulo Bertran =

Brazilian economist and historian

Paulo Bertran Wirth Chaibub

Professor at the University of Brasília

Personal details
- Born: 21 October 1948 Anápolis, Brazil
- Died: 2 October 2005 (aged 56) Goiânia, Brazil
- Education: University of Brasília
- Occupation: Economist and Historian

Paulo Bertran Wirth Chaibub (October 21, 1948 – October 2, 2005) was an economist and historian from the central region of Brazil, especially the Federal District and Goiás.

He was a professor at the University of Brasília, at Centro Universitário de Brasília, at Pontifícia Universidade Católica de Goiás and at Federal University of Goiás.

He published 12 books, among which History of Earth and Man in the Central Plateau stands out.

He was member of the Brasília Academy of Letters and Citizen of Brasília, by grant from the Legislative Chamber of the Federal District.

Furthermore, he founded the Memorial of Brazilian Ages in Brasília, an open-air museum that today is called Memorial Paulo Bertran.

== Biography ==
Born in Anápolis of multiethnic origin, he had a degree in Economics from the University of Brasília. He had additional training in history and planning from the University of Strasbourg, in France. He dedicated himself to the colonial history of the central region of Brazil, especially the place where Brasília would be located.

Writer, with articles published in newspapers, magazines and specialized publications. Founder and first editor of the Cultural Journal "DF Letras", cultural supplement to the Gazette of the Legislative Chamber of the Federal District.

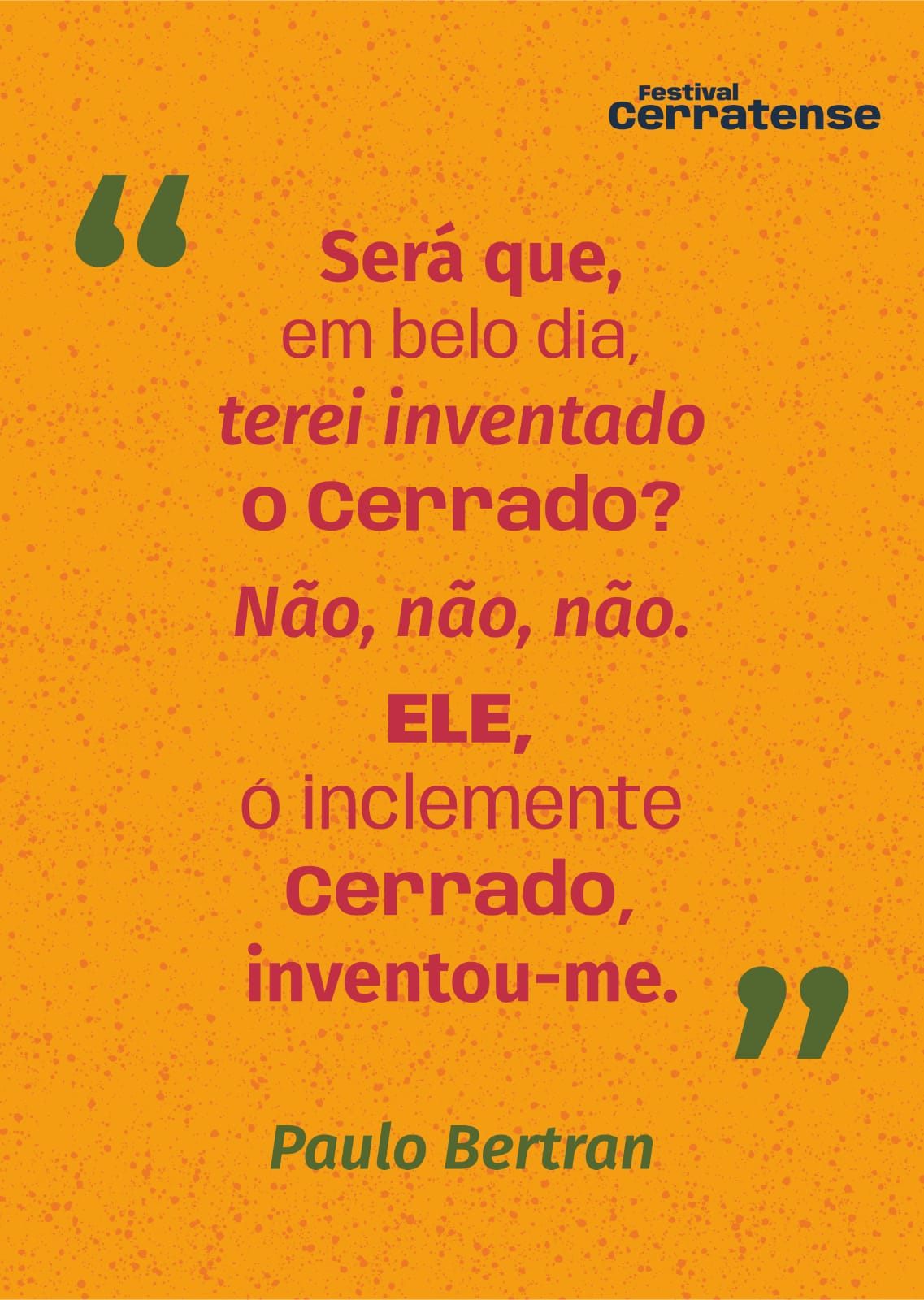
Cerratense festival poster, created by Paulo Bertran.

Farmer and specialist in building clay and adobe houses, recovering colonial construction techniques, with an innovative design with minimal environmental impact. During the Rio-92 UN Conference, he presented the exhibition "Environmental Housing in the Brazilian Cerrado".

Author of studies that made it possible for the City of Goiás to become a World Heritage Site, by UNESCO, of Corumbá de Goiás, by the National Institute of Historic and Artistic Heritage (IPHAN), of the Jaurú Monument, in Cáceres, Mato Grosso, and of the Art Deco set of Goiânia. He was an advisor representing the Central-West region on the IPHAN Council.

He introduces the concept of Eco-History in modern Brazilian historiography. He wrote about the economic history of the Center-West, the history of the land and man of the Central Plateau, he recovered the history of Niquelândia, about the passage of the Coluna Prestes through the geographical center of the country, he gave a literary tone to the history of the City of Goiás, described by him as follows: "The City of Goiás, in view of the historical genealogy of the ancient Brazilian capitals, is the most perfect example existing today of a lineage, of an urban morphology and culture that has escaped classification: ancient city of backlands of the Cerrado. Simple, heretogeneous, intimate, stripped down. Mimetic, like the surrounding savannah and the 2002 different windows through which it looks at us."

According to a text published in the newspaper Correio Braziliense, on the occasion of his death, "he was a researcher who got his boots dirty, wandered through the depths of the highland land, soaked up the charms of the cerrado, and was enchanted by the ancestral population that to this day lives in hidden rural areas." Ana Miranda described that "Bertran's book revealed to me another past of the Central Plateau, which I imagined as just cattle paths, corrals, but was full of villages, colonizers, field nymphs, Indians, expeditions, priests, tragedies, sesmarias, mining, treasures, eating..."

In recognition of his work as an environmentalist, Paulo Bertran named a new type of Brazilian vanilla, Vanilla Bertrani.

Full member of the Brasília Academy of Letters, the Planalto Academy of Letters and Arts, the Pirenópolis Academy of Letters, the Historical and Geographic Institute of the Federal District, the Historical and Geographic Institute of Goiás and the Historical and Geographic Institute of São Paulo.

Citizen of Brasília, by grant from the Legislative Chamber of the Federal District. Citizen of Niquelândia, granted by the Legislative Chamber of the Municipality of Niquelândia. Citizen Vilaboense, granted by the Municipal Chamber of the City of Goiás. Commander of the "Order of Merit Anhanguera", the highest honorary title in the State of Goiás.

He won several awards, including: Literary Prize from the National Book Institute, on the occasion of the launch of the book "An Introduction to the Economic History of the Central-West of Brazil", in 1988; Clio History Prize, from the São Paulo History Academy, on the occasion of the launch of the book "History of the Earth and Man in the Central Planalto - Eco-history of the Federal District, from the Indigenous to the Colonizer", in 1995 and Amália Hermano Trophy, from the Goiás State Culture Council, in 2000.

The library of the Legislative Chamber of the Federal District is called Paulo Bertran Library. One of the three libraries at the Oscar Niemeyer Cultural Center, in Goiânia, is also called the Paulo Bertran Library.

Paulo Bertran coined the term Cerratense, which designates the “people of the Cerrado”, a term celebrated for creating a symbolic identity for the people who live in the Cerrado biome.

Rediscoverer of the Stone City of Pirenópolis, the largest stone city in the country, originally described in 1871 by the French doctor and naturalist François Henry Trigant des Genettes, who reported having discovered "'in the Pyrenean Mountains the Lost City of the Atlantes, covering a large expanse of land, with walls for fortifications, wide streets and squares, along which he observed very eroded ruins of statues, gigantic temples, theaters, palaces, residences, tombs...' Paulo Bertran recognizes that the French doctor's exaggeration was due to the fact that, at the time, there were no instruments that allowed differentiating archaeological ruins from natural phenomena.

He recovered the landmarks of the Sertão General Road, mentioned in documents from the 17th and 19th centuries, which crossed Brazil from east to west, from Bahia to Mato Grosso, which connected Salvador to the City of Goiás and crossed the north of the Federal District.

He carried out exploratory research in Serra Dourada, in the city of Goiás, on the eve of the health problems that caused his death.

== Publications ==
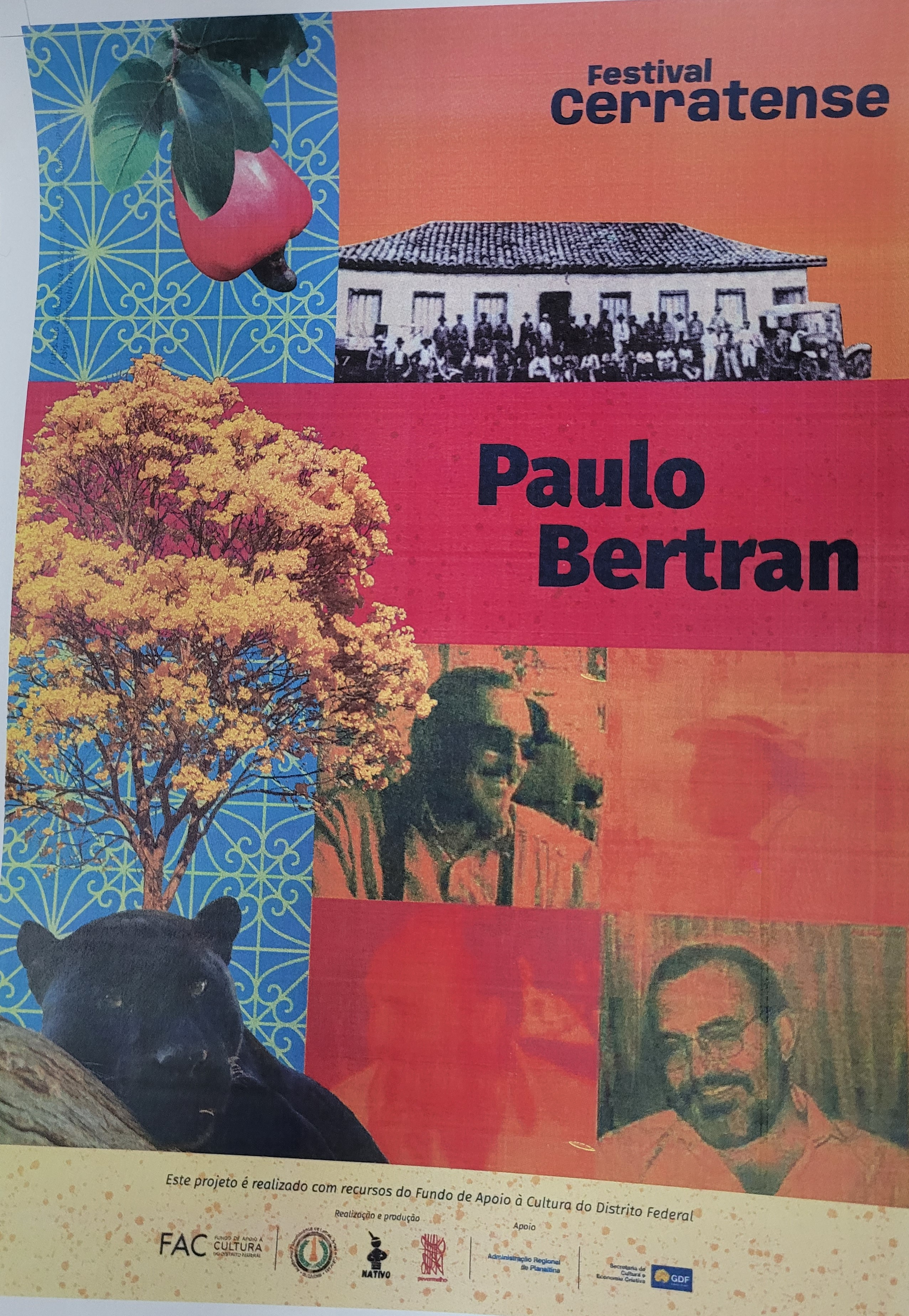
Cerratense festival poster, created by Paulo Bertran.

Acclaimed as an author who wrote History with literary taste, published the following books:

- Economic Formation of Goiás (1979): the author's first book, foresees issues that would become central in later works, such as the importance of the Cerrado for the economic context and indigenous history.
- An Introduction to the Economic History of the Central-West of Brazil: Conceived in 1982, as an expansion of the study of the "Economic Formation of Goiás".
- Memory of Niquelândia (1985): Essay in 14 chapters about the region of Niquelândia and the Court of Traíras, the richest in the 18th century of the then Captaincy of Goiás.
- History of Earth and Man in the Central Plateau: From geological history to the formation of the Cerrado, passing through prehistoric occupation. Flagship in the Brasília region. The gold discoveries of the 18th century. Stingrays, mines, sesmarias and colonial roads. Work in 18 chapters, with 3 editions, by Solo Editors, Verano Editor and Universidade de Brasília publishing company.
- General News from the Captaincy of Goiás (1997): The oldest known history of the Planalto Central, rescued by Paulo Bertran in the archives of the National and Ultramarine Library of Lisbon. The first volume contains the history of the camps, farms and mines on the threshold of gold decline, in addition to the geographical description of the captaincy and colonial roads. The second volume publishes period reports, sometimes by unknown authors. Both volumes are preceded by an analysis by Paulo Bertran.
- History of Niquelândia (1998): Revised and updated edition of the book Memory of Niquelândia.
- Cerratenses (1998): Book of poetry.
- Memorial das Ages of Brazil (2004): Written in co-authorship with Graça Fleury, the small work summarizes the foundations of geological history, the eco-history of the Cerrado and prehistory that guided the creation of the Memorial das Ages of Brazil, in Brasilia. It also serves as a synthesis for visitors and young scholars who are interested in Brazilian rock art.
- Goiás: 1722-2022 (organizer) (2002): Collection organized in partnership with Nasr Chaul. It seeks to fill the gap in a global work about the State of Goiás, but which also included its regional parts, without being a university thesis or fictional work. Divided into two parts: the first deals with geology, cerrado, history, sociology and economics. The second of the regional memories: the four cardinal points of the State of Goiás. Also, express mention of Chapada dos Veadeiros, Pirineus and Cidade de Goiás. Collaboration by Carmo Bernardes. Highly illustrated bilingual edition. Promoted by the Goiana Culture Agency Pedro Ludovico Teixeira and the Government of the State of Goiás. It was the official gift of the State of Goiás to national and foreign visitors.
- City of Goiás: World Heritage Site. Origins. (2004) Book with text by Paulo Bertran and photographs by Rui Faquini. The City of Goiás, then recently recognized as a World Heritage Site by UNESCO, is described on historical, political and cultural fronts. From the founding of the old capital, Vila Boa de Goyaz, until the 1930s. At the end of the book, Paulo Bertran analyzed the change of the capital to Goiânia and its relationship with the changes from Rio de Janeiro to Brasília and from Ouro Preto to Belo Horizonte.
- Palmeiras de Goiás: First Century (2005): Book commemorating the first centenary of the city of Goiás, its origins and notable facts: contextualization of the old Povoado do Alemão on the route of the bandeirantes and the difficulties overcome by the explorers of the backlands, which were so often inhospitable. Work completed by Graça Fleury.
- Open Field Sertão (2007, posthumous publication): Book of complete poems. Work completed by Graça Fleury. Contents of the book, as described by Paulo Bertran: "It must be about thirty years of general poetry and, when organizing the book, half a dozen subjects asked to be linked into half-elective and half-quantum entities, which become the chapters of this book, subdivided into four volumes. In the first, my travels, real or metaphorical without giving up the scepter at hand. In the second, my life as a historian, an unhealthy profession for living with so many dead, in addition to the discipline of verisimilitude. Therefore, I tempered with plenty of sex, to distract myself, and not you - curious and voluptuous reader. In the third, my life as a farmer, my encounter with the nature of the Cerrado and everything else that brought me the Assombrado farm in clouds and air. Fourth and final chapter of the book, I accepted my affections, many almost chaste. At the end of the book, I placed three appendix of poems for people who are also sensitive to nature and literature, like myself. The illustrations I chose for the book are by Gustave Doré, an old French artist from the 19th century who my grandfather introduced me to and who are still there, as transversal relics of my bookstore and my life. Welcome, dear and voluptuous reader, to my intimacy and nakedness."

== The Legend of Urbano's Gold ==
The Urbano Gold Route, dated 1749, is one of the oldest documents in the Federal District and Central Plateau region. It was written by the bandeirante Urbano do Couto Menezes, who allegedly discovered a fabulous gold mine north of Brasília, a record published by Paulo Bertran in the book History of Earth and Man in the Central Plateau. All the geographical features mentioned by Urbano are recognizable in the current landscape of the Federal District and surrounding areas, except - of course - the last ones, in the vicinity of the famous mine.

== Paulo Bertran Memorial ==
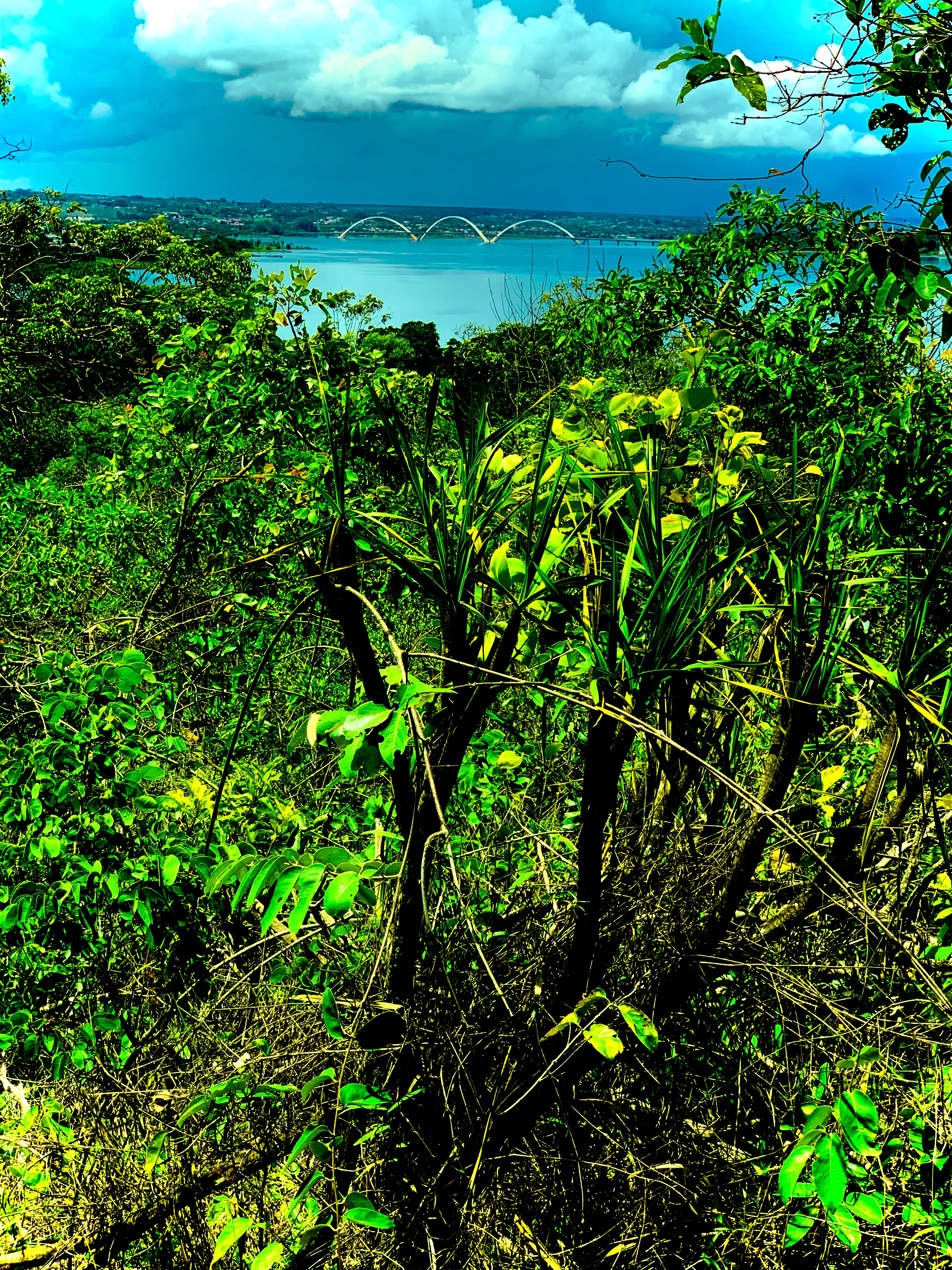
Canela de Ema and Juscelino Kubitschek bridge, view from the Paulo Bertran Memorial, in Brasília.

In 2003, Paulo Bertran created in Brasília, together with Maria das Graças Fleury Curado, the Memorial of Brazilian Ages and the Bertran Fleury Institute, presided by him until his death.

Bertran reproduced the main Brazilian cave paintings on very old rocks, in a preserved cerrado area, overlooking Paranoá Lake, in Brasília.

The original name of the open pavilion in which Bertran received students and researchers for the walk on the painted rocks was called Memorial of Brazilian Ages. The name was a reference, firstly, to the geological age, which is based on the large group of blackened rocks and which a billion years ago constituted the bottom of an extensive sea that extended across almost the entire Federal District, up to Alto Paraíso de Goiás, in Chapada dos Veadeiros. The second Era described by the name, dating from 45 to 60 million years ago, is the emergence of the cerrado, considered by botanists as the main vegetation of South America. There is a trail of native species identified at the site. The third Age is that of Man, who may have arrived in Brazil around 50 thousand years ago, from which his oldest prehistoric paintings, are reproduced there.

According to a report by Correio Braziliense, "Bertran's vocation for digging into the oldest antiquity led him to create, in the North Lake Mansions Sector, the Memorial of Brazilian Ages, an open-air museum, which records the history of the formation of the Central Plateau, geological, of the formation of the Cerrado and the arrival of man on this highland floor. Bertran made colorful poetry with the earth from the 150 meter long wall, which remained from the excavation to remove sand during the construction of Brasília. To tell the story of man's arrival in Brazil, Bertran reproduced on a large scale cave paintings found in 25 Brazilian states dating back to 10 thousand years ago. The result is a playful wall that seduces children with paintings from an ancestral time."

After the historian's death, the place in Brasília came to be called the Paulo Bertran Memorial. Maria das Graças Fleury Curado, his widow, founded the Paulo Bertran Memorial in Cidade Goiás, preserving a considerable part of his collection and receiving tourists and scholars.

== Family ==
He married Sulamita Costa Wirth Chaibub in 1972. He married Ana Sudária Lemos Serra in the 90s. He finally married Maria das Graças Fleury Curado, with whom lived until his death. He left three children: João Frederico Bertran Wirth Chaibub (1975), Maria Paula Costa Bertran (1980), Professor at the University of São Paulo, and André Gustavo Machado Bertran (1987).
