= Vianópolis =

- Municipality
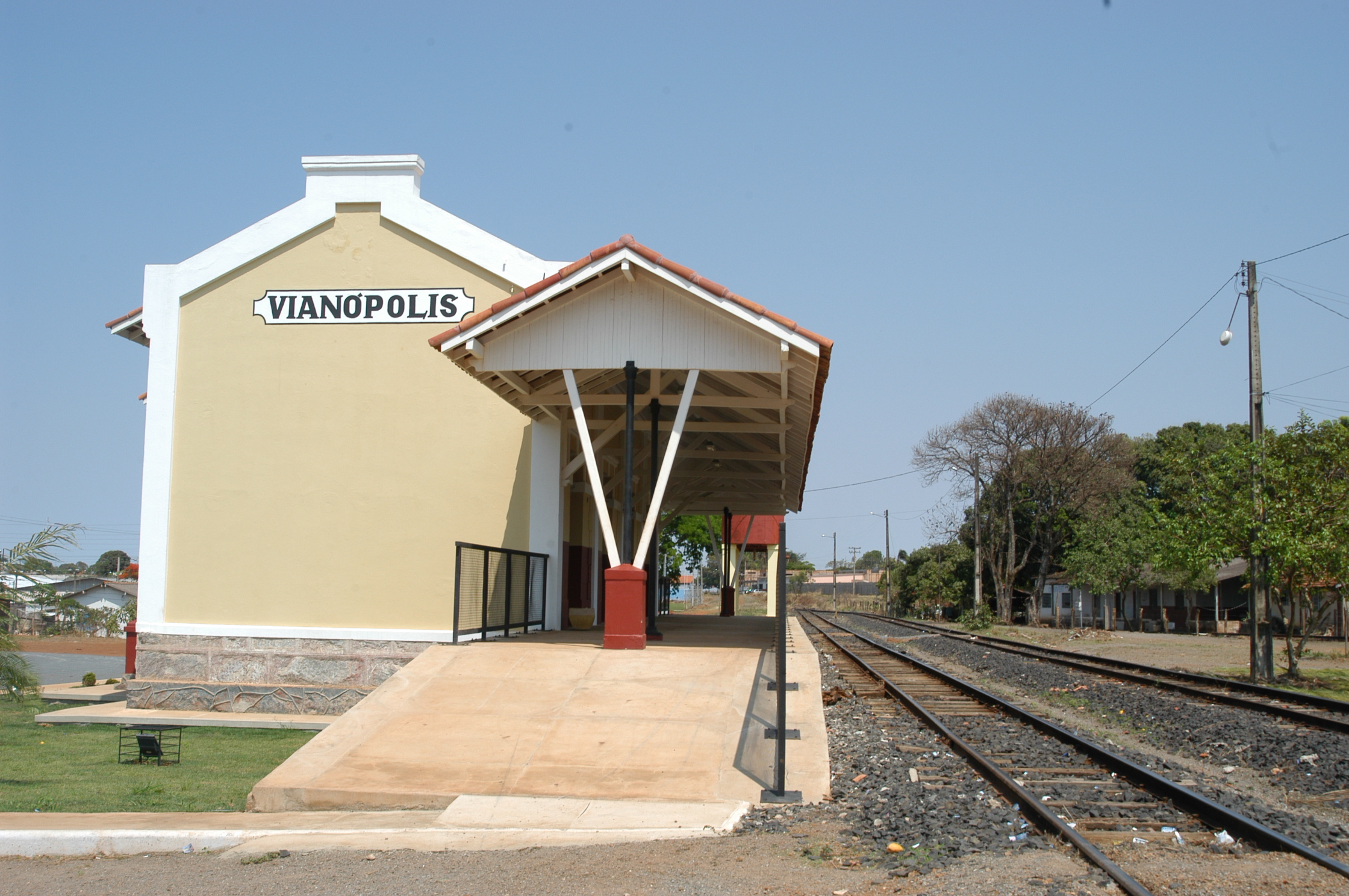

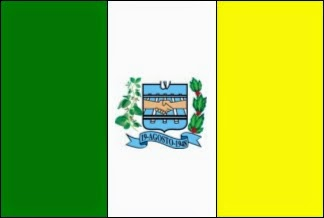
- Flag

- Location in Goiás state

- Location in Brazil
- Coordinates: 16°45′00″S 48°30′40″W
- Country: Brazil
- Region: Central-West
- State: Goiás
- Microregion: Pires do Rio

Area
  - Total: 954.3 km^{2} (368.5 sq mi)
- Elevation: 1,002 m (3,287 ft)

Population (2020)
  - Total: 13,977
  - Density: 14.65/km^{2} (37.93/sq mi)
- Time zone: UTC−3 (BRT)

Vianópolis is a small municipality in the center of the Brazilian state of Goiás.

== Location ==
Vianópolis is located 90 km. from the state capital, Goiânia. Highway connections are made by BR-457 / GO-010 / GO-330 / passing through the cities of Bonfinópolis, Leopoldo de Bulhões and Silvânia. It is in the Pires do Rio Microregion and has boundaries with Orizona, Pires do Rio, São Miguel do Passa Quatro and Silvânia.

== Political information ==
- Mayor: Antônio Divino de Resende (January 2005)
- City council: 09 members
- Eligible voters: 8,328 (December/2007)

== Demographics ==
- Population density: 12.77 inhabitants/km^{2} (2007)
- Population in 1980: 7,934
- Population in 2007: 12,187
- Urban population: 9,105 (2007)
- Rural population: 3,082 (2007)
- Population growth rate: 2.27% 1996/2007

== The economy ==
The economy is based on subsistence agriculture, cattle raising, services, public administration, and small transformation industries.

- Industrial units: 32 (2007)
- Commercial units: 143 (2007)
- Dairy: - Ind. e Com. de Laticínios Ponte Funda Ltda (22/05/2006)
- Financial institutions (01/06/2005): Banco do Brasil S.A., BRADESCO S.A.
- Cattle herd: 52,500 head (12,200 milk cows) (2006)
- Main crops: cotton, rice, bananas, sugarcane, barley, beans, manioc, corn, sorghum, tangerines, wheat, tomatoes, and soybeans (25,000 hectares).

Agricultural data 2006

- Number of farms: 656
- Total area: 37,221 ha.
- Area of permanent crops: 2,597 ha.
- Area of perennial crops: 13,648 ha.
- Area of natural pasture: 15,018 ha.
- Area of woodland and forests: 5,391 ha.
- Persons dependent on farming: 1,450
- Farms with tractors: 124
- Number of tractors: 322
- Cattle herd: 52,500 head IBGE

== Education (2006) ==
- Schools: 13
- Classrooms: 97
- Teachers: 179
- Students: 3,641
- Higher education: none
- Adult literacy rate: 87.6% (2000) (national average was 86.4%)

== Health (2007) ==
- Hospitals: 1
- Hospital beds: 37
- Ambulatory clinics: 8
- Infant mortality rate: 22.64 (2000) (national average was 33.0).

Municipal Human Development Index

- MHDI: 0.784
- State ranking: 24 (out of 242 municipalities in 2000)
- National ranking: 970 (out of 5,507 municipalities in 2000) For the complete list see Frigoletto.com

== See also ==
- List of municipalities in Goiás
- Microregions of Goiás
