= Orizona =

- Municipality
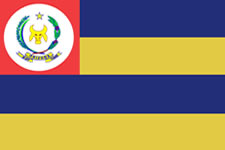
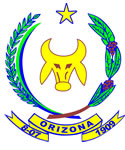
- Flag Coat of arms

- Location in Goiás state

- Location in Brazil
- Coordinates: 17°02′02″S 48°17′52″W
- Country: Brazil
- Region: Central-West
- State: Goiás
- Microregion: Pires do Rio Microregion

Area
  - Total: 1,972.8 km^{2} (761.7 sq mi)
- Elevation: 806 m (2,644 ft)

Population (2020)
  - Total: 15,725
  - Density: 7.9709/km^{2} (20.645/sq mi)
- Time zone: UTC−3 (BRT)
- Postal code: 75280-000-
- Website: www.prefeituraorizona.go.gov.br/telefones.asp

Orizona is a municipality in Goiás state, Brazil.

== Location ==
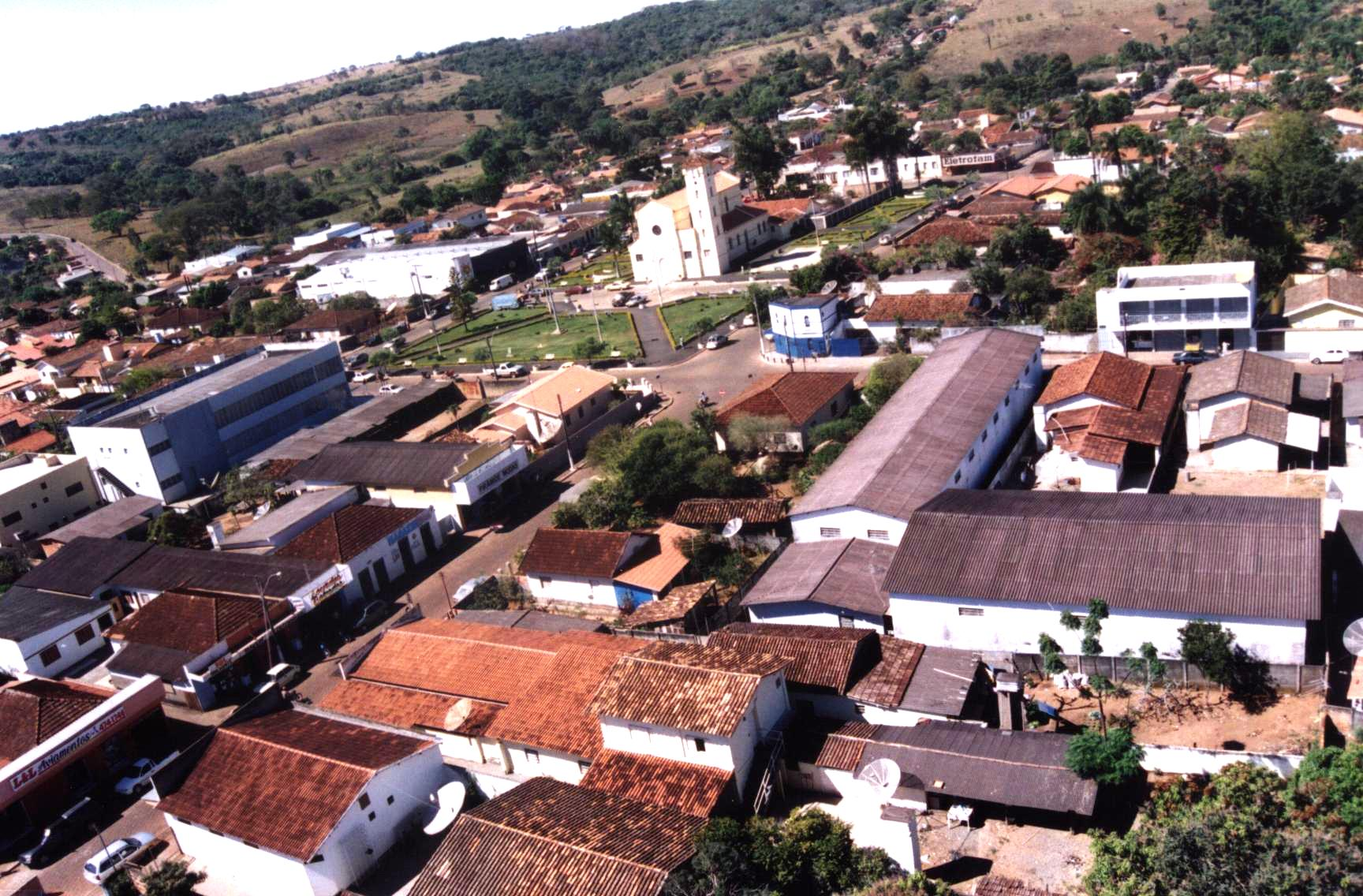
aerial image of the city of Orizona

Orizona is 138 km from the state capital of Goiânia, 200 km from Brasília, 150 from Catalão and 260 from Uberlândia, which is located in the rich Triângulo Mineiro of Minas Gerais. It is part of the Pires do Rio Microregion. See Citybrazil for all the regions.

Highway connections from Goiânia are made by BR-357 / GO-010 / Bonfinópolis / Vianópolis / GO-330. See Sepin for all the distances.

It borders Silvânia, Luziânia, Cristalina, Pires do Rio, Ipameri, Urutaí and Vianópolis.

== History ==
Orizona was founded by Joaquim Fernandes de Castro and José Pereira Cardoso in 1850 when they started construction of a chapel on the banks of the Ribeirão Santa Bárbara, a tributary of the Corumbá River. In 1890 the settlement became a district called Capela dos Correias, and in 1909 it became a city called Campo Formoso. In 1943 the name was changed to Orizona, from "oriza", meaning rice, and "zona", meaning region—Region of Rice. The name was chosen in a public contest, in which 42 people voted. It was suggested by Dr. Raphael Leme Franco, other names proposed were Caruaba, Coema, Manhana, Porangatu, Potira, Jubara and Oriza. See Prefeitura de Orizona for the history.

Political information

- In January 2005 the Mayor was Itamar Dias Teixeira. The city council had 9 members and there were 10,750 eligible voters in December 2007.

== Demographics ==
In 2007 the population density was 7.29 inhabitants/km^{2}. A large part of the population is still rural, relatively uncommon in the state of Goiás. In 2007 there were 7,6673 inhabitants in the urban area and 6,707 inhabitants in the rural area. The population has grown by about a thousand inhabitants since 1980.

== Economy ==
Orizona has been prospering with the production of high quality Cachaça made from sugarcane, which is exported to several countries. There are about 30 small rum distilleries in the town. Cachaça, also called pinga, caninha, aguardente, cana, or mé, is a rum like drink, which differs from rum in that it is made from sugarcane juice while rum is made from molasses.

Crossed by state highway GO-330 and several municipal roads, and bathed by the Corumbá and Piracanjuba rivers, the main economic activities of the area are the growing of corn, soybeans, rice sugarcane, and dairy cattle. There are several milk processing factories that receive over a million liters a day. Orizona is the fifth largest producer of milk in the state. Out of a total of two thousand milk producers, about 90% are small farmers. In addition, there are brickworks and mining companies that extract phosphates and sand.

In 2007 there were 26 industrial units and 159 retail units. There was an industrial park. There were 2 dairies: Laticínios JL Ltda. - COAPRO - Cooperativa Agropecuária de Produtos Rurais de Orizona Ltda. In June 2005 there were 2 financial institutions: Banco Itaú S.A. - Banco do Brasil S.A.

In 2007 there were 1,497 automobiles in the city. In 2005 the biggest sectors of employment were commerce and public administration.

In 2006 there were 127,000 head of cattle, 931,400 head of poultry, and 9,600 head of swine. The main agricultural products were sugarcane, coffee, passion fruit, hearts of palm, rice, beans, manioc, corn (3,300 hectares), soybeans (25,000 hectares) and sorghum (1,800 hectares).

Agricultural data 2006

- Number of farms: 1,588
- Total area: 135,590 ha.
- Area of permanent crops: 1,127 ha.
- Area of perennial crops: 23,227 ha.
- Area of natural pasture: 68.933 ha.
- Area of woodland and forests: 37,359 ha.
- Persons dependent on farming: 5,000
- Farms with tractors: 289
- Number of tractors: 577
- Cattle herd: 127,000 head IBGE

== Health and education ==
In 2007 there was 1 hospital with 33 beds and 12 walk-in health clinics. In 2000 the infant mortality rate was 19.70, well below the national average of 33.0.

In 2006 the school system had 17 schools, 140 classrooms, 265 teachers, and 3,621 students. The adult literacy rate was 89.4%, above the national average of 86.4%. There were no institutions of higher education.

Ranking on the Municipal Human Development Index

- MHDI: 0.768
- State ranking: 42 (out of 242 municipalities)
- National ranking: 1,380 (out of 5,507 municipalities) For the complete list see Frigoletto.com

== See also ==
- List of municipalities in Goiás
- Microregions of Goiás
