= House of Senador Canedo =

- Casa do Senador Canedo
- Location within Brazil

General information
- Location: Rua Adélino Roque, 958-1040, Bela Vista de Goiás, Goiás, Brazil
- Coordinates: 16.977398°S 48.953926°W

Technical details
- Floor count: 1

National Historic Heritage of Brazil
- Designated: 1986
- Reference no.: 502

The House of Senador Canedo (Portuguese: Casa do Senador Canedo) is a historic residence and cultural center in Bela Vista de Goiás, Goiás, Brazil. It was built by Antônio Amaro da Silva Canedo (1844-1895), a merchant and politician of Goiás. The residence was a noted meeting place for regional politicians, members of the clergy, and travelers in the region. It now houses a cultural space to preserve the history of both Senator Canedo and the southern region of Goiás.

The house is an outstanding example of 19th century residential architecture of the region. It was built in the austere Portuguese colonial style of an earlier period, and lacks the ornamentation of Brazilian homes of the late 19th century. It was listed as a historic structure by the National Historic and Artistic Heritage Institute (IPHAN) in 1986.

== History ==
Antônio Amaro da Silva Canedo was born on Fazenda João de Deus, a farm in a rural area Goiás. He left and became one of the first inhabitants of Sussurapava, founded in 1866, now part of the municipality of Bela Vista de Goiás. Canedo settled in Sussurapava after marrying Guilhermina de Araújo Melo in 1868. He then founded another settlement, Arraial da Bela Vista, and built his residence on a high point in the region in the 1870s. Its exact date of construction is not known. Canedo is noted for the development of fishing and agriculture in Goiás, especially for the cultivation and export of tobacco. He became an important figure in the First Brazilian Republic and was a signator of the Brazilian Constitution of 1891. His wife, Guilhermina de Araújo Melo, and daughter maintained the residence after his death.

== Structure ==
The House of Senador Canedo was built in a Portuguese colonial style despite its construction in the late 19th century. It occupies a corner lot on Rua José Alonso and Travessa São Bento, and is in close alignment with the street and is surrounded by a narrow stone sidewalk. The residence is a wood structure with adobe walls and a clay tile roof. It has a simple façade, painted white, without ornamentation and a simple interior. The house has twelves windows and three doorways, all with straight wooden lintels. The doors open directly to street, one to Rua José Alonso and two to Travessa São Bento.

== Protected status ==
The House of Senador Canedo was listed as a historic structure by the National Institute of Historic and Artistic Heritage in 1986 under inscription number 502. Unusually, its owner requested protected status of the house. Nancy Ribeiro de Araújo e Silva, then-director of the Brazilian National Institute of Educational Research and Studies, petitioned IPHAN to preserve the memory of Senator Canedo and to build a cultural center for the municipality.

== Access ==
House of Senador Canedo is open to the public and may be visited.
