= Santa Cruz de Goiás =

- Municipality
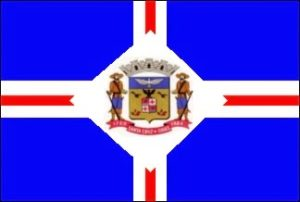
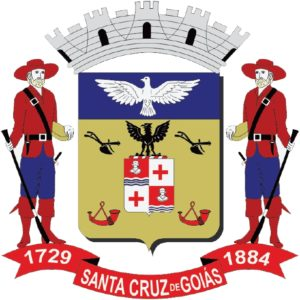
- Flag Coat of arms

- Location in Goiás state

- Location in Brazil
- Coordinates: 17°18′55″S 48°28′54″W
- Country: Brazil
- Region: Central-West
- State: Goiás
- Microregion: Pires do Rio Microregion

Area
  - Total: 1,108.9 km^{2} (428.1 sq mi)
- Elevation: 754 m (2,474 ft)

Population (2020)
  - Total: 2,819
  - Density: 2.542/km^{2} (6.584/sq mi)
- Time zone: UTC−3 (BRT)
- Postal code: 75220-000

Santa Cruz de Goiás is a municipality in southeast Goiás state, Brazil.

== Geography ==
Santa Cruz is located in the southeastern part of the state, 33 km. west of regional center, Pires do Rio. The Rio dos Bois, a tributary of the Corumbá River flows from north to south through the municipality. It has boundaries with Pires do Rio, Palmelo, Cristianópolis, Caldas Novas and Piracanjuba. It is 121 kilometers from the state capital, Goiânia and is connected by BR-352 / Bela Vista de Goiás / Cristianópolis / GO-020. See Distancias Rodoviarias Sepin for all the distances.

The municipality is bathed by the Rio dos Bois, Rio do Peixe, córregos Manoel Duarte, Muquém, Buriti, Pedra de Amolar, Brumadinho, Caiapó, Pirapitinga, Fundo, Mato Virgem, Água Suja, São Benedito, Córrego da Chuva, Sapé, Dantas, and by the Ribeirão Brumado. In topography there is the Serra do Rio do Peixe, the hills of Clemente, Queiroz, Cuscuzeiro, Dois Irmãos, Pertapé, Serra dos Macacos, Cabeça de Mel and Capão Bonito. The climate is tropical humid.

== Political Information ==
- Mayor: Esley Augusto Damaso (January 2005)
- City council: 09
- Eligible voters: 2,898 (December/2007)

== Demographics ==
Population distribution is characterized by the fact that the rural population outnumbered the urban by almost two to one.

- Population density: 3.19 inhabitants/km^{2} (2007)
- Urban population: 1,007 (2007)
- Rural population: 2,535 (2007)
- Population growth: a loss of about 500 people since 1980

== The economy ==
The economy is based on agriculture, cattle raising, services, public administration, and small transformation industries.

- Industrial units: 3 (2007)
- Commercial units: 18 (2007)
- Cattle herd: 65,000 head (15,000 milk cows)
- Main crops: rice, beans, manioc, coffee, bananas, soybeans (10,000 hectares) and corn

Agricultural data 2006

- Number of farms: 725
- Total area: 97,104 ha.
- Area of permanent crops: 92 ha.
- Area of perennial crops: 13,369 ha.
- Area of natural pasture: 55,190 ha.
- Area of woodland and forests: 26,435 ha.
- Persons dependent on farming: 1,500
- Farms with tractors: 161
- Number of tractors: 316
- Cattle herd: 65,000 head IBGE

== Education (2006) ==
- Schools: 4
- Classrooms: 25
- Teachers: 40
- Students: 726
- Middle schools enrollment: 123
- Higher education: none
- Adult literacy rate: 87.5% (2000) (national average was 86.4%)

== Health (2007) ==
- Hospitals: 1
- Hospital beds: 12
- Ambulatory clinics: 3
- Infant mortality rate: 14.0 (2000) (national average was 33.0)

Human Development Index

- MHDI: 0.782
- State ranking: 26 (out of 242 municipalities)
- National ranking: 1,006 (out of 5,507 municipalities) For the complete list see Frigoletto.com

== History ==
Unlike many of the municipalities in Goiás, Santa Cruz has its origins in the 18th century, when mule drivers in 1721 on their way to the mines of Cuiabá discovered gold in the region. A cross was raised and the arraial (village) of Santa Cruz was founded in 1729. Later when the territory was divided in two Santa Cruz was the center of a julgado, which was almost the size of Portugal. In 1833 it was raised to the status of a municipality. The first railroad arrived 28 kilometers away in 1914 and the station was called Pires do Rio, which later became the most important city of the region.

Santa Cruz has rivers and waterfalls with potential for future touristic development.

== See also ==
- List of municipalities in Goiás
- Microregions of Goiás
