= Márcio Corrêa =

Brazilian politician (born 1980)

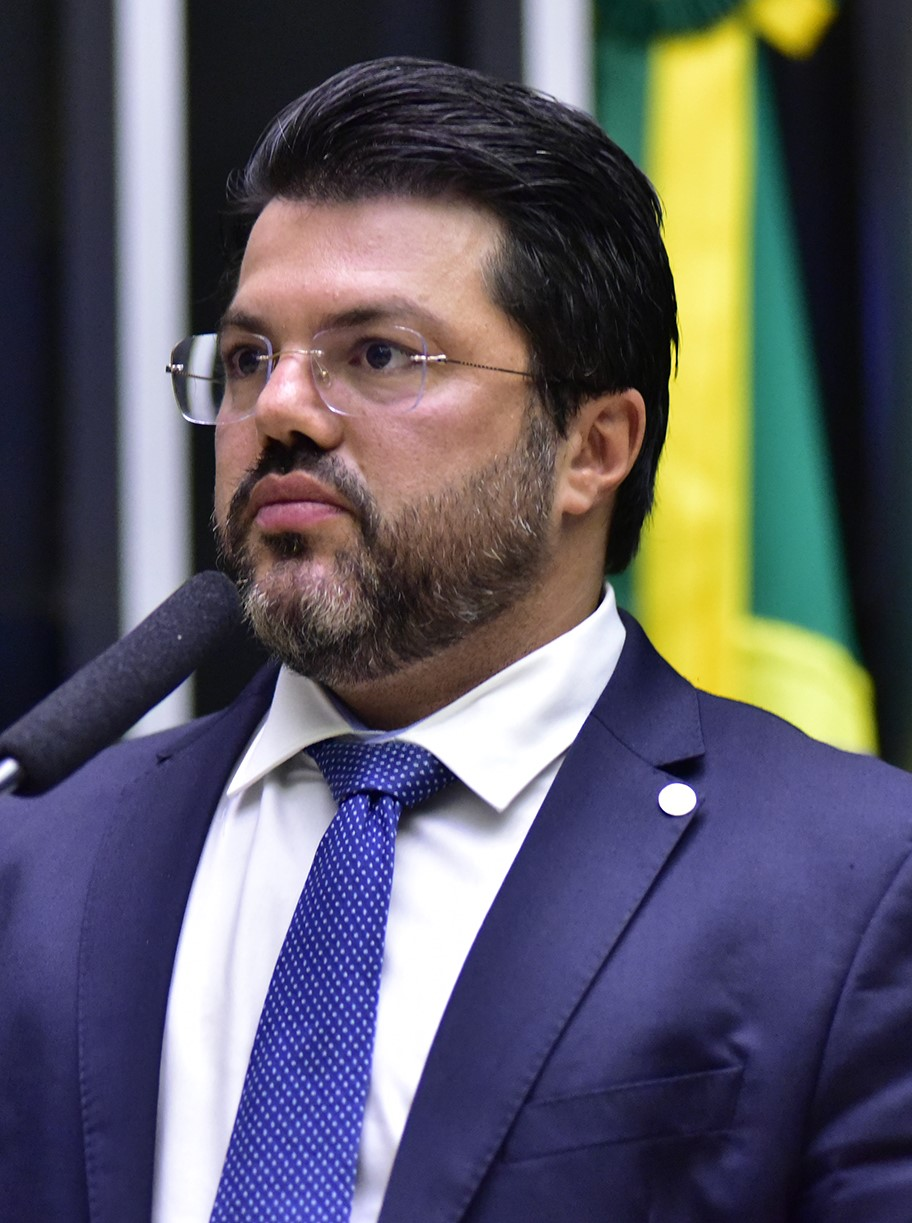
- Corrêa in 2023

Mayor of Anápolis
- Incumbent
- Assumed office 1 January 2025
- Preceded by: Roberto Naves

Personal details
- Born: 31 May 1980 (age 46)
- Party: Liberal Party (since 2024)

Márcio Aurélio Corrêa (born 31 May 1980) is a Brazilian politician serving as mayor of Anápolis since 2025. From August to December 2023, he was a member of the Chamber of Deputies.
