= Anápolis =

Anápolis, Goiás
- Municipality
- Município de Anápolis; Municipality of Anápolis
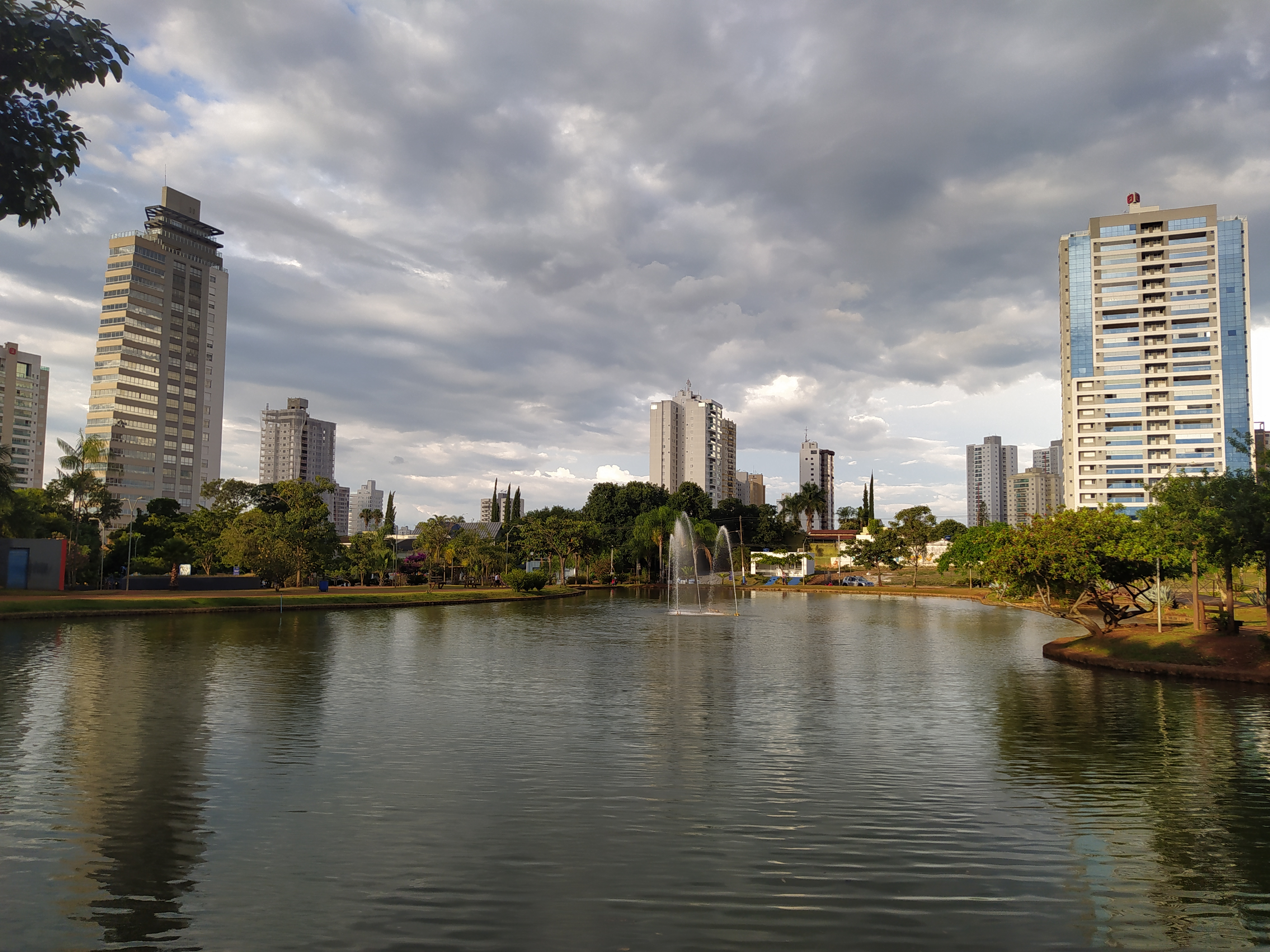
- View of Ipiranga Environmental Park (Parque Estacionamento Ipiranga)

- Flag Coat of arms
- Nickname: "Manchester of Goiás"

- Location in Brazil
- Coordinates: 16°20′02″S 48°57′07″W
- Country: Brazil
- Region: Central-West
- State: Goiás
- Settled: 18th century
- Incorporated as a town: December 15, 1887
- Incorporated as a city: July 31, 1907

Government
  - Mayor: Márcio Corrêa

Area
  - Total: 918.375 km^{2} (354.587 sq mi)
- Elevation: 1,017 m (3,337 ft)

Population (2022)
  - Total: 398,869
  - Estimate (2025): 420,300
  - Density: 434.320/km^{2} (1,124.88/sq mi)
- Demonym: Anapolino
- Time zone: UTC-3 (UTC-3)
  - Summer (DST): UTC-2 (BRST)
- Postal code: 75000-000
- Area code: +55 62
- Website: www.anapolis.go.gov.br

Anápolis (/əˈnæpəlɪs/ ə-NAP-əl-iss, Brazilian Portuguese: [ɐˈnapolis]) is a Brazilian city in the state of Goiás. It is located between two capitals, the federal capital Brasília and state capital Goiânia. It is the third most populous city in the state, with 398,869 inhabitants according to the Brazilian Institute of Geographic and Statistics in 2022. It is an important industrial and logistics center in the Brazilian Central-West. Its GDP is R$ 10 billion, approximately US$4.4 billion, which makes it the second largest in the state. The city became an industrial power after the implementation of its Industrial District in 1970.

== Etymology ==
Anápolis means "city of Ana" in Greek (Ana + polis, city).

== History ==
The settlement began in the 18th century, due to the travels of the drovers to the region of gold mines in the nearby towns. Some of the travelers, when they did not find any more precious metals, decided to settle in the thorp. The first historical registry was written in 1819, when the French naturalist and traveler Auguste de Saint-Hillaire, traveling from Bonfim (Silvânia) towards Meia-Ponte (Pirenópolis), stays in the region called Tapirs' Farm. This name is due to the abundance of this animal in the region. The first official document was written on April 25, 1870, when a group of residents made a donation of some parts of their lands to the Our Lady of Saint Anne Patrimony.

According to a local myth, in 1859, Ana das Dores left Jaraguá towards Bonfim (Silvânia), on a mule train travel. One of the mules, which was carrying the statue of Saint Anne, got lost. When, the mule was found, it was not willing to move, and das Dores interpreted this as the desire of the Saint to stay there. After she promised to build a chapel in homage to the Saint, the mule started to move again. The erection of the building was done by her son, Gomes de Souza Ramos, eleven years later. In 1872, a document requesting the status of a parish was written. It was carried by Souza Ramos to the provincial president. The pledge was granted and the thorn became a parish on August 6, 1873.

José da Silva Batista moved to the region on February 28, 1882, from Meia-Ponte (Pirenópolis). Seeking greater autonomy, He and Sousa Ramos requested the incorporation of the town, which was granted on December 15, 1887. However, due to some obstacles mainly by the authorities from Meia-Ponte, which was concerned about the loss of taxes, it became a town 'de facto' on March 10, 1892, when Batista was named the president of the administrative board of the Santana das Antas town. The town became a city on July 31, 1907.

On January 9, 1924, the city became the first in the state to have electricity. The telegraph followed in 1926 and the railroad reached the city in 1935.

== Geography ==
=== Physical setting ===
Anápolis is located in Center-Western Brazil. It is located in a plateau, called Central Plateau, at an elevation of 1,017 metres (3,337 ft). The area is 918.3 square kilometres (354.6 sq mi), and the limiting municipalities are Abadiânia, Campo Limpo de Goiás, Gameleira de Goiás, Goianápolis, Leopoldo de Bulhões, Nerópolis, Pirenópolis, Silvânia and Terezópolis de Goiás. Anápolis is also the center of the Anápolis Microregion, and belongs to the Goiás Center mesoregion.

=== Climate ===
Anápolis

Climate chart (precipitation, max. and min. temperature)
J	F	M	A	M	J	J	A	S	O	N	D
281 27 19	166 28 19	263 28 20	115 28 19	42 28 18	6 27 16	14 27 15	48 28 17	48 29 18	125 28 19	154 27 19	205 28 19
- █ Average max. and min. temperatures in °C
- █ Precipitation totals in mm
Imperial conversion
J	F	M	A	M	J	J	A	S	O	N	D
11 80 66	6.5 82 67	10 82 67	4.5 83 66	1.7 82 64	0.2 81 60	0.5 80 59	1.9 83 62	1.9 85 64	4.9 83 66	6.1 81 66	8.1 82 66
- █ Average max. and min. temperatures in °F
- █ Precipitation totals in inches

The climate of the city is tropical savanna (Aw), according to Köppen climate classification. The winters are dry and cool, mean low temperature is around 14 °C (57 °F), and mean precipitation in July is 4 millimetres (0.16 in).

The hottest months are August and September, reaching a mean high of 29 °C (84 °F). Rainfall is abundant during the summer, averaging 280 millimetres (11 in) in January.

== Transportation ==
Anápolis is located on the main Brasília-Goiânia highway (BR 060), which has now become a four-lane motorway. It is also the starting point for the famous Belém-Brasília highway (BR 153). Distances to Goiânia is 54 kilometres (34 mi), to Brasília is 140 kilometres (87 mi) and to São Paulo 872 kilometres (542 mi).

The municipality is served by a branch of the Centro-Atlântica railroad, with 685 kilometres (426 mi) of network in Goiás, which allows for connections with the important ports of the country. Anápolis will be the starting point for the north–south railroad, in construction, which will connect with the Port of Itaqui, in Maranhão, as well as with other strategic points in the North and Northeast. The proposed Expresso Pequi rail service between Brasília and Goiânia is planned to serve a station in Anápolis.

Anápolis is served by Anápolis Airport, which is being upgraded to a cargo facility.

== Air Force Base ==
Anápolis Air Force Base - ALA2, one of their most important bases of the Brazilian Air Force, is located in Anápolis. It protects the nearby capital (Brasília) being as well an important portion of the Amazon Surveillance System (SIVAM).

== Economy ==
Anápolis is one of the most developed municipalities in the state. It also has one of the fastest developing industrial sectors with several pharmaceutical plants. Transportation is good, with highways linking the city with both Goiânia and Brasília.

There is a large pool of educated professionals produced by the several institutions of higher learning in the city, e.g. the State University of Goiás. The surrounding land is excellent for intensive production of fruit like oranges, bananas, and sugarcane.

All of these factors make Anápolis the most competitive city after the capital.

- Gross Domestic Product: 6.265 billion Reais in 2008 as pointed out by IBGE, which was the second largest in the state after Goiânia and the seventh largest in Brazil. This PIB was 5.7% of the state PIB of 75.274 billion Reais in 2008 as referenced by IBGE IBGE - Cidades@. See Portalsepin for the complete list of all municipalities in Goiás.

Hyundai has a plant in Anápolis, which produces the Hyundai Tucson and Hyundai HB20.

Ranking of Anápolis on list of top ten municipalities in GDP in Goiás in 2012 and 2015 (in Reais) IBGE - Cidades@:

- Goiânia - R$46.632.000 billion
- Anápolis - R$13.301.000 billion
- Aparecida de Goiânia - R$11.518.000 billion
- Rio Verde - R$8.078.000 billion
- Catalão - R$5.679.000 billion
- Itumbiara - R$3.971.000 billion
- Jataí - R$3.842.000 billion
- Luziânia - R$3.353.000 billion
- São Simão - R$3.106.000 billion
- Senador Canedo -R$ 2.685.000 billion
- Gross Domestic Product per capita: 18,910 Reais in 2008, which was just above the state average of 12,878 Reais in the same year.

Historically Anápolis has always been the center of a rich agricultural area. Animal raising has always been the main economic mainstay of the region. In 2003 the municipality had 65,000 head of beef cattle, 8,000 pigs, 138,000 poultry (second place in the state), and 9,500 head of dairy cattle. In addition, rice (1 km^{2} / 160 tons), corn (16 km^{2} / 7,200 tons), and soybeans (17 km^{2} / 4,590 tons) are also grown in quantity.

Other important crops:

- tomatoes: 0,5 km^{2} / 2,250 tons
- wheat: 0.8 km^{2} / 360 tons
- sugarcane: 0.2 km^{2} / 800 tons
- manioc: 2 km^{2} / 3,000 tons
- bananas: 8.3 km^{2} / 8,300 tons
- coffee: 0.5 km^{2} / 30 tons
- coconut: 0.27 km^{2} / 216 thousand fruits
- citrus fruits: 2.75 km^{2} / 3,800 tons
- passion fruit: 0.05 km^{2} / 40 tons

Source: IBGE

DAIA (Distrito Agro-Industrial de Anapolis) is the industrial sector of Anapolis. It includes many large companies such as Laboratório Teuto Brasil, a pharmaceuticals manufacturing plant, the largest generic medicine-producing plant in Brazil. The federal government decided to build a major logistical centre around the DAIA, which is a distribution point for goods throughout Brazil by road, rail and air.

The main entrepreneurial sectors employing workers in 2003 were the transformation industry with 12,980 workers, construction with 1,222 workers, commerce with 18,114 workers, hotels and restaurants with 1,635 workers, transportation with 3,880 workers, services with 2,429 workers, public administration, defense, and social security with 6,724 workers, education with 3,723 workers, and health with 2,247 workers.

There were 23 financial institutions in 2004.

=== Motor vehicles ===
In May 2011:

- automobiles: 90,332
- trucks: 9,151
- pickups: 13,542
- motorcycles: 39,044

== Education and health ==
In education the city is well served. In addition to the more than 100 primary schools there are eight secondary schools and several public and private colleges. The colleges are: Associação Educativa Evangélica, Faculdade de Filosofia São Miguel Arcanjo, Faculdade do Instituto Brasil-FIBRA, Faculdade Anhanguera de Anápolis, and Faculdade Raízes. It is home to a campus of the Goiás State University (UEG) and the UniEVANGÉLICA, a Protestant university and one of the first institutes of higher education founded in the state of Goiás.

There are 94 health establishments including 25 hospitals with 1,445 beds. The infant mortality rate is 22.15.

- Doctors: 811 (IBGE 2002)
- Nurses: 66
- Dentists: 105
- Infant mortality rate: 20.77 in 2000. It was 28.27 in 1991.
- Primary schools: 56,665 students, 2,517 teachers, 51 schools (IBGE 2004)
- Secondary schools: 2,319 students, 933 teachers, 40 schools

College: 9,103 students, 1,527 teachers, 6 schools

- Literacy rate: 92.0% in 2000. It was 87.5% in 1991.

The water supply system reaches 95% of the population while the sewage system reaches 53%.

The city is also the seat of the Roman Catholic Diocese of Anápolis.

== Ranking on the UN MHDI ==
(See the Human Development Index)

- Life expectancy: 70.2
- Adult literacy rate: 0.912
- School attendance rate: 0.844
- MHDI: 0.788
- State ranking: 16 (out of 242 municipalities)
- National ranking: 851 (out of 5,507 municipalities)

All data are from 2000

For the complete list see

== Notable people ==
- Luciano – footballer
- Derley – footballer
- Henrique Meirelles – politician
- Felipe Guimarães – racing driver
- Paulo Bertran – economist and historian

== See also ==
- List of municipalities in Goiás
