= Cristianópolis =

- Municipality
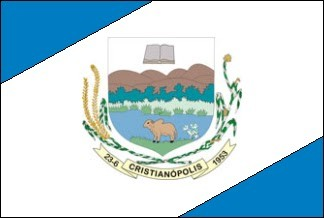
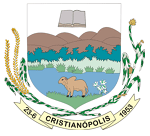
- Flag Coat of arms

- Location in Goiás state

- Location in Brazil
- Coordinates: 17°11′56″S 48°41′53″W
- Country: Brazil
- Region: Central-West
- State: Goiás
- Microregion: Pires do Rio Microregion

Area
  - Total: 225.3 km^{2} (87.0 sq mi)
- Elevation: 802 m (2,631 ft)

Population (2020)
  - Total: 2,964
  - Density: 13.16/km^{2} (34.07/sq mi)
- Time zone: UTC−3 (BRT)
- Postal code: 75230-000

Cristianópolis is a municipality in south-eastern Goiás state, Brazil.

== Geographical Information ==
Cristianópolis is in the Pires do Rio Microregion approximately 93 kilometers from the state capital, Goiânia. Highway connections from Goiânia are made by BR-352 / Bela Vista de Goiás. See Distancias Rodoviarias Sepin

Neighboring municipalities are:

- north: São Miguel do Passa Quatro
- south: Piracanjuba and Santa Cruz de Goiás
- east: Bela Vista de Goiás
- west: Pires do Rio

== Demographic and Political Data ==
- Population density: 3.49 inhabitants/km^{2} (2007)
- Population growth rate 2000/2007: 0.56%
- Urban population: 2,470 (2007)
- Rural population: 571 (2007)
- Eligible voters: 2,573 (2004)
- City government in 2005:
- Mayor (prefeito): Iris Aurélio Borges Dias
- Vice-mayor (vice-prefeito): Márcia Regina Bueno de Mattos
- Councilmembers (vereadores): 09

=== The Economy ===
The main economic activities were livestock raising, agriculture, and services.

Motor vehicles

- Automobiles: 391
- Pickup trucks: 87
- Number of inhabitants per motor vehicle: 6 (Data are from 2007)

Economic Data (All data are from IBGE/Sepin)

- Industrial units: 05 (2007)
- Retail units: 36 (2007)
- Cattle: 17,150 (2006)
- Soybeans: 1,150 hectares producing 2,900 tons (2006)
- Modest production of beans, manioc, and sugarcane
- Farms: 219
- Agricultural land: 18,925 ha, of which 1,500 ha. were planted and 12,000 ha. were natural pasture. 300 workers were employed in agriculture. 37 farms had a total of 51 tractors (2006).

=== Health and Education ===
- Infant mortality rate in 2000: 24.45 in 1,000 live births
- Literacy rate in 2000: 91.3%

The health system had 01 hospital with 23 beds and 02 health clinics (2007). There were 04 schools with 27 classrooms, 51 teachers, and 1,083 students (2006).

Municipal Human Development Index

- MHDI: 0.771
- State ranking: 39 (out of 242 municipalities)
- National ranking: 1,313 (out of 5,507 municipalities) For the complete list see Frigoletto

=== History ===
In 1905 Ricardo José do Vale, minister of the Igreja Cristã Evangélica, arrived from Rio de Janeiro, preaching the Protestant faith. In 1906 a farmer who had converted, donated land to build a church, which was built in 1909. Other Protestants arrived from nearby towns and a settlement appeared called Gameleira. In 1927 the name was changed to Cristianópolis. In 1931 the village was raised to the status of district belonging to Santa Cruz de Goiás. Later the district became part of Pires do Rio. In 1944 the Franciscan order bought lands and built a Catholic chapel. In 1953 Cristianópolis became a municipality.

== See also ==
- List of municipalities in Goiás
- Microregions of Goiás
