= Silvânia =

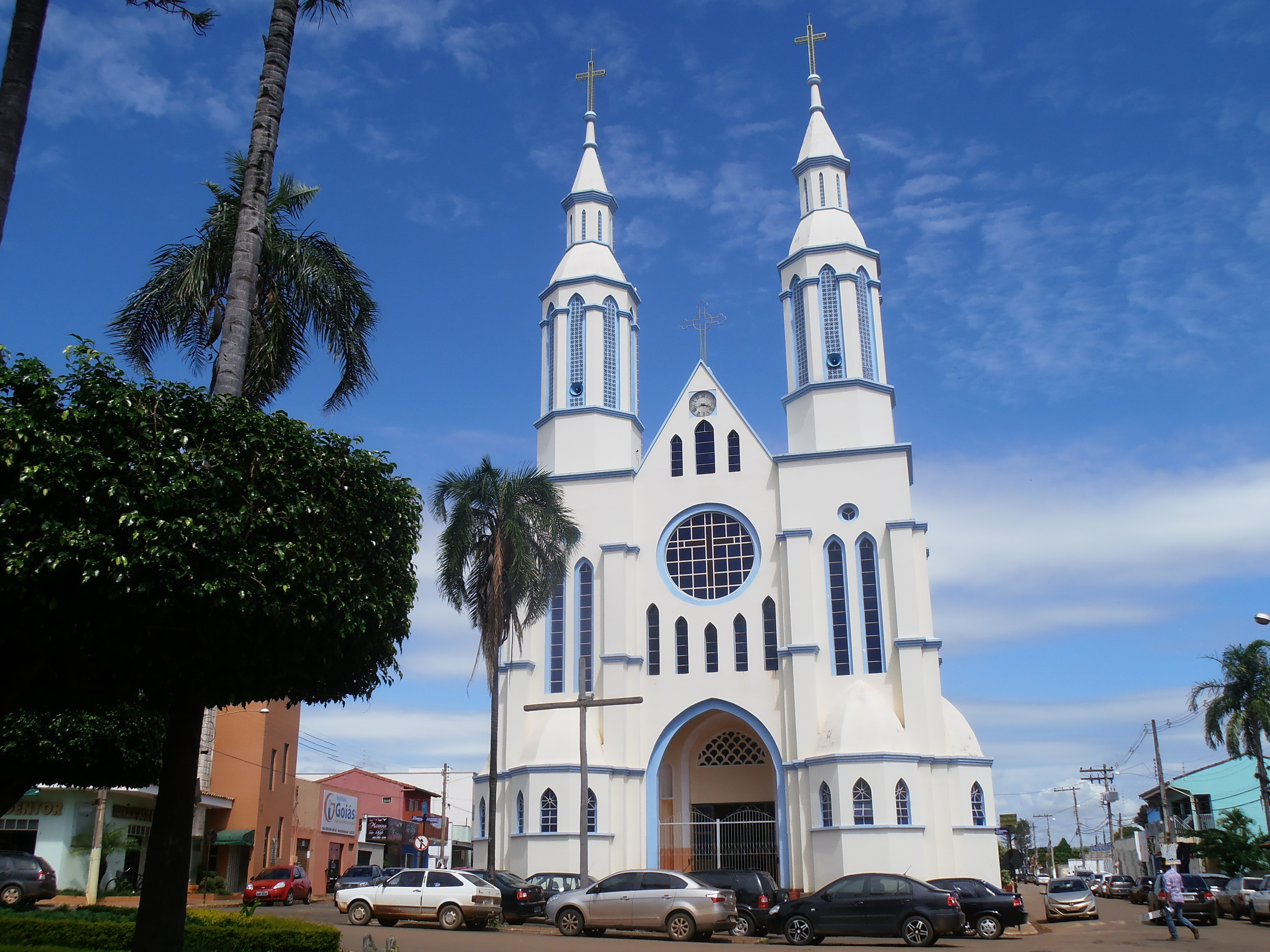

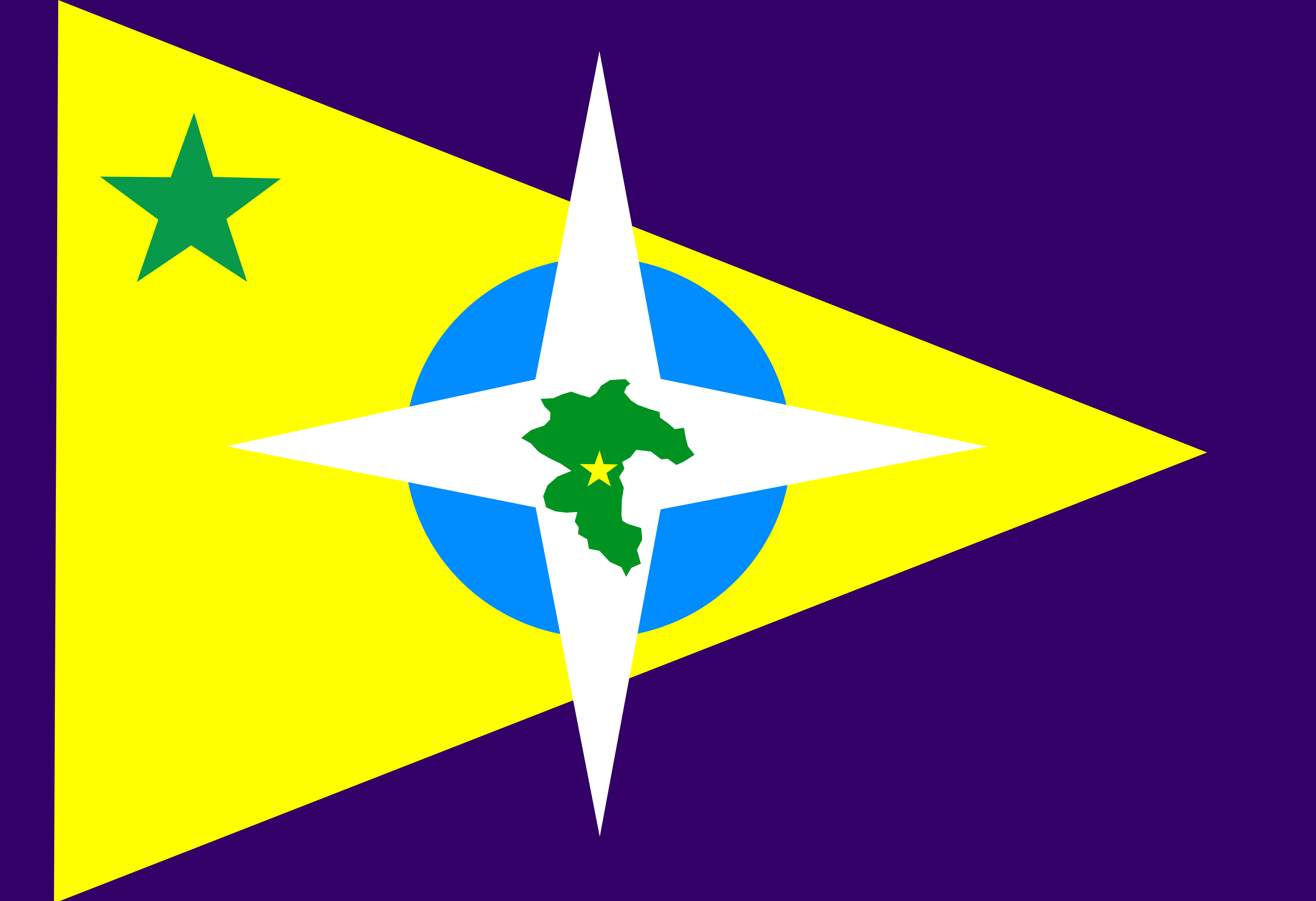
- Flag

- Coordinates: 16°40′04″S 48°35′13″W
- Country: Brazil
- State: Goiás
- Established: 1847

Area
  - Total: 2,864.7 km^{2} (1,106.1 sq mi)
- Elevation: 917 m (3,009 ft)

Population (2020)
  - Total: 20,816
  - Density: 7.2664/km^{2} (18.820/sq mi)
- Postal code: 76160-000

Silvânia is a municipality in southcentral Goiás state, Brazil.

== History ==
Around 1774, it was discovered gold in the region. There was an influx of gold miners; with them, it was brought a statue of Nosso Senhor of Bonfim. It gave name for the small village that was created, Bonfim. It became a municipality in 1857. It was renamed to Silvânia in 1943, in a homage to a local Silva family .

Vianópolis, Leopoldo de Bulhões, São Miguel do Passa Quatro and Gameleira de Goiás were dismembered from Silvânia.

== Location and highway connections ==
Silvânia is located 77 kilometers from the state capital of Goiânia, 180 km. from the national capital of Brasília, and 65 from the second most important city of the state, Anápolis. The highways that link it with other cities are: GO-330, GO-010, GO-139 and GO-437.

Connections starting in Goiânia are made by BR-457 / GO-010 / Bonfinópolis / Leopoldo de Bulhões / GO-437 / GO-139. See Sepin for all the distances.

It borders the municipalities of Gameleira de Goiás, Abadiânia and Alexânia to the north; Vianópolis, São Miguel do Passa Quatro and Bela Vista de Goiás to the south; Luziânia and Orizona to the east; Caldazinha and Leopoldo de Bulhões to the west.

The climate is tropical humid, with an average annual temperature of 23 °C. The annual rainfall is 1,750 millimeters. The vegetation is cerrado or savanna.

== Political information ==
- Mayor: Geraldo Luiz Santana (January 2021-)
- City council: 09
- Eligible voters: 15,088 (November/2021)

== Demographics ==
- Population density: 8.14 inhabitants/km^{2} (2010)
- Population in 1980: 19,809
- Population in 2007: 18,370
- Population in 2010: 19.089
- Population in 2020 (estimated): 20.816
- Urban population: 11,968 (2007)
- Rural population: 6,502 (2007)
- Population growth rate: -0.19% 1996/2007

== The economy ==
The main economic activities are dairy cattle and soybean growing. Silvânia has large areas planted in soybeans and corn. Brick making is also very important for the local economy. Production is shipped to Goiânia and Brasília.

- Industrial units: 34 (2007)
- Commercial units: 159 (2007)
- Dairy: Granja Leiteira Sol Dourado Ltda. - Coop. Agrop. dos Prod. Rurais de Silvânia (22/05/2006)
- Financial institutions: Banco do Brasil S.A. - CEF - Banco Itaú S.A. (08/2007)
- Cattle herd: 104,300 head (26,500 milk cows)
- Main crops in 2006: cotton, rice, sweet potatoes, coffee, sugarcane, barley, beans (1,690 hectares), guava, oranges, manioc, corn (3,180 hectares), soybeans (50,000 hectares), and tomatoes.

Agricultural data 2006

- Number of farms: 1,914
- Total area: 176,952 ha.
- Area of permanent crops: 1,471 ha.
- Area of perennial crops: 58,498 ha.
- Area of natural pasture: 79,473 ha.
- Area of woodland and forests: 34,114 ha.
- Persons dependent on farming: 1,632
- Farms with tractors: 332
- Number of tractors: 690
- Cattle herd: 104,300 head IBGE

== Education (2006) ==
- Schools: 16
- Total Students: 5,027
- Middle school enrollment: 731
- Higher education: Unidade Universitária da UEG
- Adult literacy rate: 88.0% (2000) (national average was 86.4%)

Silvânia is home to two of the most important schools in the 20th century in Goiás, Instituto Auxiliadora and Ginásio Anchieta.

== Health (2007) ==
- Hospitals: 1
- Hospital beds: 44
- Ambulatory clinics: 10
- Infant mortality rate: 12,5 (2019)

Human Development Index

- MHDI: 0.709
- State ranking: 47 (out of 246 municipalities)
- National ranking: 904 (out of 5,507 municipalities)

== Tourism and History ==
Silvânia has cultural attractions that are valuable for local and regional culture. Monuments from the 18th century, century-old houses, possible archeological and remains of the bandeirante and Black colonizations are some of the attractions.

There are some historical gold pits, like Roda, Batatal, Caixão, Coração, das Moças and das Velhas.

It is one of the oldest cities of Goiás . Unlike many cities in the state of Goiás, Silvânia has a long history, beginning in 1774 when miners coming from Santa Luzia, present-day Luziânia, found gold in the region. Soon a small settlement, called Bonfim, was established. In 1943 Bonfim was renamed to Silvânia in tribute to a local figure, Vicente Miguel da Silva.

== See also ==
- List of municipalities in Goiás
- Microregions of Goiás
