= Abadiânia =

- Municipality
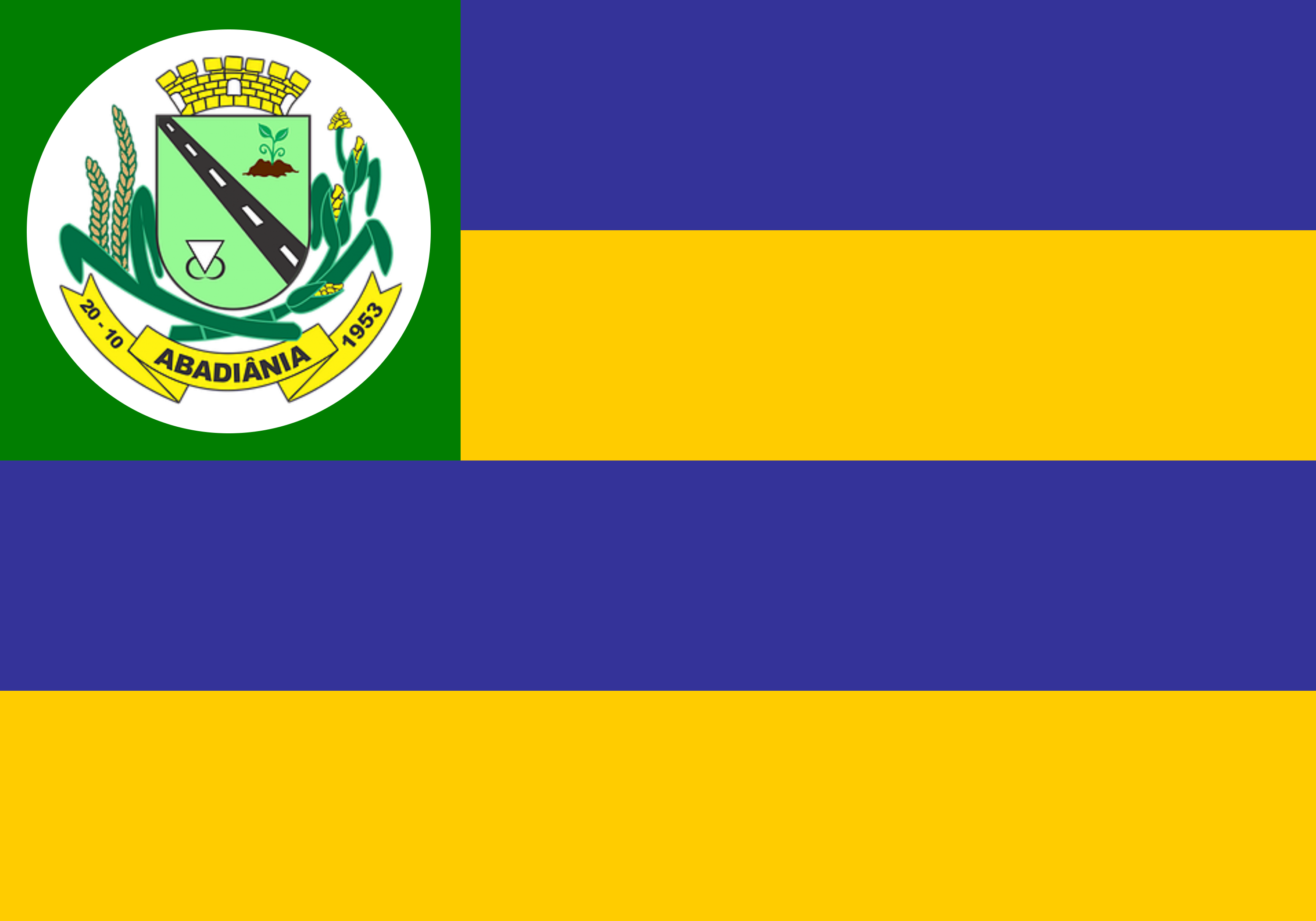
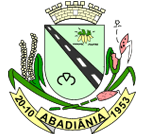
- Flag Coat of arms

- Location in Goiás state

- Location in Brazil
- Coordinates: 16°06′S 48°48′W
- Country: Brazil
- Region: Central-West
- State: Goiás
- Microregion: Entorno do Distrito Federal

Area
  - Total: 1,047 km^{2} (404 sq mi)
- Elevation: 1,052 m (3,451 ft)

Population (2020)
  - Total: 20,461
  - Density: 19.54/km^{2} (50.61/sq mi)
- Time zone: UTC−3 (BRT)
- Postal code: 72940-000

Abadiânia is a municipality in the state of Goiás, Brazil.

== Location ==
Abadiânia is part of the Entorno do Distrito Federal statistical micro-region. Neighboring municipalities are:

- North: Pirenópolis, Corumbá de Goiás, and Alexânia
- South: Silvânia
- East: Anápolis
- West: Alexânia

The distance to the state capital, Goiânia, is 88 km. Highway connections with Brasília, Anápolis and Goiânia are made by BR-060 (also called in the Brasília-Anápolis stretch as Belém–Brasília Highway). It is known as the City of Spiritual Cures because of the presence of psychic healer, João de Deus, who attracts many national and international tourists seeking cures for their maladies.

Located between Brasília and Goiânia on the BR-060 highway, it has always been a stopping-off point for travellers between the two cities.

== Economy ==
There is modest agricultural production—corn, rice and soybeans—as well as cattle raising. There were two dairies JERIVÁ - Comércio, Indústria e Agropecuária Ltda. and Laticínios Vale do Capivari. (22/05/2006). There was also a meat packing plant Luiz Carlos Pavão e Outros (22/05/2006). There was one financial institution in the town in 2004: Banco Itaú S.A.

Agricultural data 2006

- Farms: 1,150
- Total area: 85,292 ha.
- Area of permanent crops: 5,901 ha.
- Area of perennial crops: 5,703 ha.
- Area of pasture: 51,990 ha.
- Area of woodland and forests: 17,255 ha.
- Cattle herd: 41,665

The main tourist attractions are two waterfalls—Cachoeira do Ribeirão Curralinho and Cachoeira Pedregulho—the Corumbá River and the religious festivals.

== History ==
Despite being a municipality since 1953 Abadiânia was only installed in its present site in the 1960s. The population was not happy with conditions of access and little by little they began to build their houses along the highway 18 kilometers away, where the present-day town is located.

== Health and education ==
- Infant mortality rate: 22.36 in 1,000 live births (2000)
- Literacy rate: 84.1 (2000)
- Hospitals: none (February 2007)
- Schools: 18 with 3,369 students (2006)

On the Human Development Index of 2000 Abadiânia had a score of 0.723, which gave it a state ranking of 165 (out of 242 municipalities) and a national ranking of 2,569 (out of 5,507 municipalities).

== See also ==
- List of municipalities in Goiás
