= Bela Vista de Goiás =

- Municipality
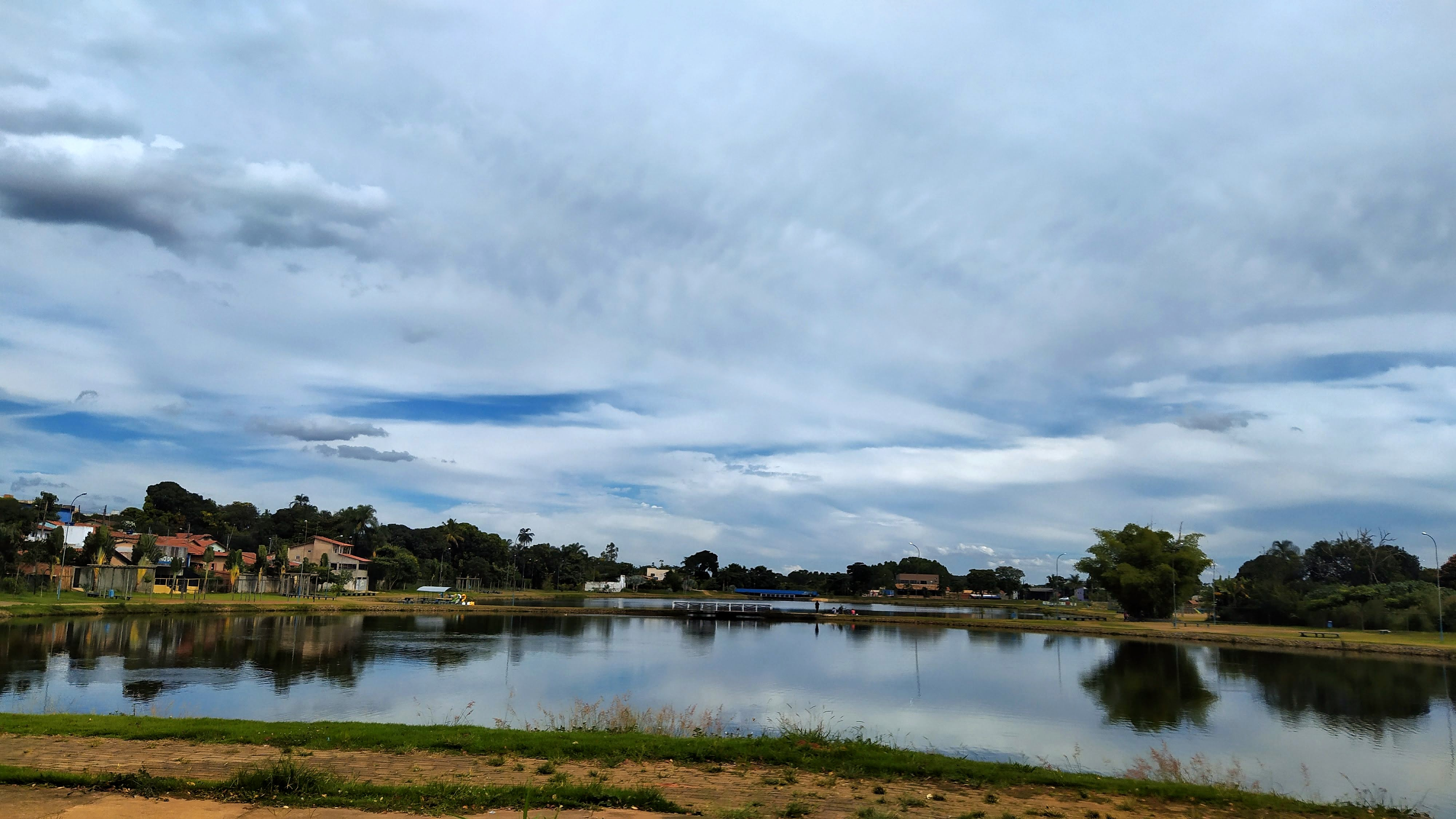

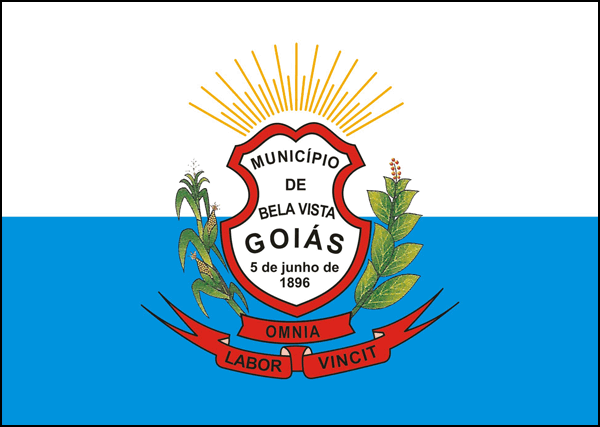
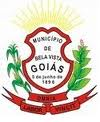
- Flag Coat of arms

- Location in Goiás state

- Location in Brazil
- Coordinates: 16°58′S 48°57′W
- Country: Brazil
- Region: Central-West
- State: Goiás
- Microregion: Goiânia Microregion

Area
  - Total: 1,280.9 km^{2} (494.6 sq mi)
- Elevation: 803 m (2,635 ft)

Population (2020)
  - Total: 30,492
  - Density: 23.805/km^{2} (61.655/sq mi)
- Time zone: UTC−3 (BRT)
- Postal code: 75240-000

Bela Vista de Goiás is a city located in central Goiás state in Brazil.

== Location ==
It is 45 kilometers from the state capital of Goiânia

The municipality has boundaries with Hidrolândia, Caldazinha, Aparecida de Goiânia, Senador Canedo, and Silvânia. It is part of the Goiânia Microregion, which has more than one million seven hundred thousand inhabitants.

Bela Vista de Goiás is crossed by the following rivers and streams: Meia Ponte River, Caldas, Piracanjuba, Boa Vista, Arapuca, Sozinha, São José, Aborrecido, Nuelo, Barro Amarelo, São Bento, Furado, Sucuri and Boa Vistinha.

== Demographic and political data ==
- Population density: 16.15 inhabitants/km^{2} (2007)
- Population growth rate: 1.01% (2000-2007)
- Population in 2007: 20,615
- Population in 1980: 17,255
- Population in 1991: 17,316
- Urban population: 14,296 (2007)
- Rural population: 6,319 (2007)
- Urban and rural population in 1990: 6,010 inhab / 11,245 inhab
- Eligible voters: 15,970 (2007)
- City government in 2007: mayor (Wilson Marcos Teles), vice-mayor (Sônia Maria Moreira Gonçalves), and 9 councilpersons

== Economy ==
During the period of 1930 to 1950 Bela Vista was famous for its tobacco production and was called the "Tobacco capital of Brazil"". Low international prices caused the gradual abandonment of this crop and today the economy is more diversified with fruit production, milk, and the poultry industry.

There is a large herd of cattle—113,620 head in 2006, of which 21,590 were milking cows. It is one of the largest producers of milk in the state and has two milk processing units. There are approximately eight thousand milk producers, of whom 70% are small farmers. Milk production was over 30 million liters a year in 2003.

The main employer of the region is Granja Saito, a producer of poultry. Poultry production, besides being the mainstay of the economy, stimulates the local production of corn, soybeans, and wheat. According to IBGE there were 1,390,000 chickens in the region. Egg production was 27,104 dozens a year (2006).

=== Agricultural products ===
The main agricultural products in 2006 were bananas, coffee, coconut, citrus fruits, rice, manioc, corn, and soybeans. Source: IBGE

=== Sectors of employment (2003) ===
The main economic employers in 2003 were:

- agriculture and cattle raising: 523 workers
- transformation industries: 689 workers
- construction: 231 workers
- commerce: 278 units employing 782 workers
- public administration: 415 workers

== Health ==
- Infant mortality in 2000: 22.68
- Infant mortality in 1990: 28.50
- Hospitals: 2 with 59 beds in 2007

== Education ==
- Literacy rate in 2000: 87.7
- Literacy rate in 1991: 80.3
- There were 27 schools with 5,980 students enrolled in 2006

See Sepin for data on municipalities in Goiás.

Human Development Index: 0.744

- State ranking: 92 (out of 242 municipalities)
- National ranking: 2,052 (out of 5,507 municipalities)

Data are from 2000

== Historic structures ==
Bela Vista de Goiás is home to a number of structures of the late 19th century. The House of Senador Canedo was designated a national monument by the National Institute of Historic and Artistic Heritage (IPHAN) in 1986.

== See also ==
- List of municipalities in Goiás
