= Anhanguera, Goiás =

Anhanguera
- Municipality
- Municipality of Anhanguera
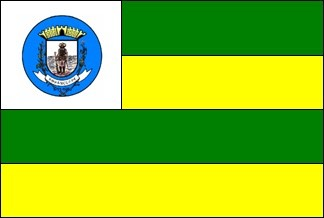
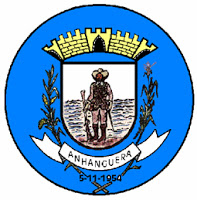
- Flag Coat of arms

- Location of Anhanguera in Goiás
- Coordinates: 18°20′13″S 48°13′08″W
- Country: Brazil
- Region: Central-West
- State: Goiás
- Founded: November 5, 1953

Government
  - Mayor: Wander Pereira da Cunha (PTB)

Area
  - Total: 56.642 km^{2} (21.870 sq mi)
- Elevation: 378.08 m (1,240.4 ft)

Population (2020)
  - Total: 1,190
  - Density: 18.01/km^{2} (46.6/sq mi)
- Time zone: UTC−3 (BRT)
- HDI (2000): 0.802 – high

Anhanguera (Portuguese pronunciation) is a municipality in south Goiás state, Brazil. In 2020 the population was 1,190 and the total area of the municipality was 57.0 km^{2}, making it the smallest municipality in the state of Goiás and the smallest in all Central-West Brazil, both in population and area.

== Geography ==
Anhanguera is part of the Catalão Microregion and is located close to the Paranaíba River, which forms the boundary between the states of Goiás and Minas Gerais. It is between two large reservoirs—Lago Itumbiara and Lago Emborcação. Poor highway connections are made with the important cities of Araguari, in the south, and Catalão in a northeast direction. The municipality is completely surrounded by Cumari in the north.

The distance to the state capital, Goiânia, is 316 km. Highway connections are made by BR-153 / Bela Vista de Goiás / Piracanjuba / GO-217 / GO-139 / Caldas Novas / Corumbaíba / GO-210 / Goiandira / GO-305 / Cumari. Sepin

The town is located near the Embarcação de Furnas reservoir. On long holidays there are aquatic sports like sailing and jet-ski.

== History ==
In 1908 the railroad came to Goiás but Onofre Ferreira, the owner of the land in the region, would not allow any strangers to build houses. In 1928 he sold the land to Belchior de Godoy, who created lots near the train station and began to sell them to new settlers. A brick works was built and soon there was a small settlement with the name Anhanguera, after the great pioneer who opened up these lands during the Portuguese colonial period. In 1955 the town became a municipality, but with the construction of the dam and reservoir of Furnas it lost most of its land and became the smallest municipality in the state. Compensation money was paid by the state, which was invested in tourism.

== Demographic and Political Data ==
- Population density: 17.05 inhabitants/km^{2} (2007)
- Population in 1980: 732
- Population in 1991: 869
- Urban population: 919 (2007)
- Rural population: 47 (2007)
- Population growth rate 2000-2007: 1.10.%
- Eligible voters: 893 (09/2004)
- City government: Mayor—Francisco da Silva; Vice-mayor—Joaquim Aparecido Rosa; 09 councilmembers

== Economy ==
The economy is based on cattle raising, agriculture, services, and public service. There were 3,800 head of cattle in 2006. The main agricultural products were rice, sugarcane, manioc, and corn. In 2006 there were 26 farms with a total area of 5,174 ha. of which 3,945 ha. were pasture. There were 8 tractors registered and 43 agricultural workers.

Motor Vehicles in 2004

- automobiles: 100
- trucks: 06
- pickups: 07
- motorcycles: 07

== Health and education ==
- Health establishments: 01 (2007)
- Hospital beds: 0
- Infant Mortality: 14.32 in 2000 (27.43 in 1990)
- Schools: 02 with 238 students
- Literacy rate: 91.3% in 2000 (87.1% in 1991)

== Ranking on the United Nations Municipal Human Development Index ==
- Life expectancy: 73.2
- Adult literacy rate: 0.902
- School attendance rate: 0.983
- MHDI: 0.794
- State ranking: 13 (out of 242 municipalities)
- National ranking: 694 (out of 5,507 municipalities)

All data are from 2000

== See also ==
- List of municipalities in Goiás
