= Três Ranchos =

- Municipality
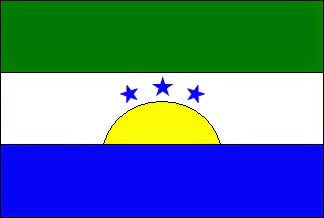
- Flag

- Location in Goiás state

- Location in Brazil
- Coordinates: 18°21′30″S 47°46′36″W
- Country: Brazil
- Region: Central-West
- State: Goiás
- Microregion: Catalão

Area
  - Total: 282.0 km^{2} (108.9 sq mi)
- Elevation: 687 m (2,254 ft)

Population (2020)
  - Total: 2,830
  - Density: 10.0/km^{2} (26.0/sq mi)
- Time zone: UTC−3 (BRT)
- Postal code: 75985-000

Três Ranchos is a municipality in south Goiás state, Brazil.

== Location ==
Três Ranchos is located in the statistical micro-region of Catalão See Citybrazil and is bordered by:

- North: Ouvidor
- East: Paranaíba River
- South: Catalão and once again by the Paranaíba
- West: Catalão.

== Highway Connections ==
It is connected to the important city of Catalão by highway GO-230, passing through Ouvidor. The distance to Catalão is 28 km.

The distance to Goiânia is 383 km. Highway connections are made by BR-352 / Bela Vista de Goiás / Cristianópolis / GO-020 / Pires do Rio / BR-352 / GO-330 / Ipameri / Catalão / GO-330 / BR-352. See Distancias Rodoviarias Sepin

There is also a small airport and two ferries that connect with the state of Minas Gerais crossing the artificial lake of Emborcação.

== History ==
Três Ranchos began as a port in 1887 on the Paranaíba River and as a place where diamonds were found. The name comes from three houses, really huts, that served as a resting place for the cattle drivers who passed through the region. With the railroad the settlement grew until it was raised to the category of district in Catalão in 1948. In 1953 it was dismembered becoming a municipality with the name Paranaíba de Goiás. Shortly after the old name Três Ranchos was restored.

== Political Information ==
- Mayor: Nivaldo da Silva Aguiar (January 2005)
- City council: 09 members
- Eligible voters: 2,843 (December/2007)

== Demographics ==
- Population density: 10.15 inhabitants/km^{2} (2007)
- Urban population: 2,528 (2007)
- Rural population: 334 (2007)
- Population growth: a gain of about 1,000 people since 1980

== The economy ==
The economy is based on tourism, subsistence agriculture, cattle raising, services, public administration, and small transformation industries.

- Industrial units: 2 (2007)
- Commercial units: 44 (2007)
- Hotels: 3 (2007)
- Cattle herd: 13,700 head (2,400 milk cows) (2006)
- Poultry: 31,300 head (2006)
- Main crops: rice, beans, manioc, corn (200 hectares), and soybeans (500 hectares).

Agricultural data 2006

- Farms: 112
- Total area: 3,048 ha.
- Area of permanent crops: 25 ha.
- Area of perennial crops: 176 ha.
- Area of natural pasture: 2,497 ha.
- Area of woodland and forests: 222 ha.
- Persons dependent on farming: 270
- Farms with tractors: 4
- Number of tractors: 4
- Cattle herd: 13,000 head

== Education (2006) ==
- Schools: 2
- Classrooms: 22
- Teachers: 39
- Students: 767
- Higher education: none
- Adult literacy rate: 90.2% (2000) (national average was 86.4%)

== Health (2007) ==
- Hospitals: 0
- Hospital beds: 0
- Ambulatory clinics: 1
- Infant mortality rate: 14.32 (2000) (national average was 33.0)

== Tourism ==
The Emborcação Reservoir, on the Paranaíba is famous for its blue color and is called Lago Azul. There are several tourist structures on the lake islands and on the banks, which help the local economy. The lake has a surface of 440 km^{2} and a maximum depth of 160 meters. It can be reached by taking highways BR-352, GO-330 and GO-208. The hydroelectric plant operated by Cemig is located near the dam, which is 30 kilometers from Três Ranchos. See Pousada3ranchos for information on the city (in Portuguese).

== Climate ==
The climate is considered moist tropical with two well defined seasons: dry winter and rainy summer, with a maximum temperature between 18 °C and 23 °C. After the formation of the lake, according to data, the days have become hotter with the maximum going higher than 30 °C.

Municipal Human Development Index

- MHDI: 0.787
- State ranking: 17 (out of 242 municipalities in 2000)
- National ranking: 873 (out of 5,507 municipalities in 2000) See Frigoletto.com

== See also ==
- List of municipalities in Goiás
- Catalão Microregion
- Microregions of Goiás
