= Corumbaíba =

- Municipality
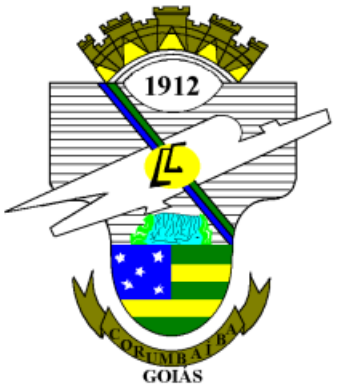
- Flag Coat of arms

- Location in Goiás state

- Location in Brazil
- Coordinates: 18°08′50″S 48°33′01″W
- Country: Brazil
- Region: Central-West
- State: Goiás
- Microregion: Catalão Microregion

Area
  - Total: 1,881.71 km^{2} (726.53 sq mi)
- Elevation: 633 m (2,077 ft)

Population (2020)
  - Total: 9,869
  - Density: 5.245/km^{2} (13.58/sq mi)
- Time zone: UTC−3 (BRT)
- Postal code: 75680-000

Corumbaíba is a municipality in southeastern Goiás state, Brazil.

== Location and connections ==
Corumbaíba is located 222 kilometers from the state capital, Goiânia. It is south of Caldas Novas and north of the Itumbiara reservoir.

Connections from Goiânia are made by BR-352 / Bela Vista de Goiás / GO-147 / Piracanjuba / GO-217 / GO-139 / Caldas Novas / Marzagão.

It has boundaries with the following municipalities:

- north: Ipameri and Caldas Novas;
- south: Araguari and Tupaciguara;
- east: Nova Aurora, Cumari, Anhangüera and Goiandira;
- west: Buriti Alegre, Água Limpa and Marzagão.

== Demographic and political data ==
- Population density: 4.24 inhabitants/km^{2} (2007)
- Population growth rate 2000/2007: 2.67.%
- Urban population in 2007: 6,107
- Rural population in 2007: 1,894
- Eligible voters in 2007: 6,263
- City government in 2005:
- Mayor (prefeito): Denismar Carneiro de Araújo
- Vice-mayor (vice-prefeito): Walter das Graças de Deus
- Councilmembers (vereadores): 09

== Economy ==
Corumbaíba has important plantations of rice, beans, corn, and soybeans. There is extensive raising of cattle for beef and milk. There are small industries producing bricks, cheese, mineral salt, and furniture. The town is well known for its ceramic vases.

Economic data

- Industrial units: 09 (2007)
- Retail units: 92 (2007)
- Dairies: Goiásminas Indústria de Laticínios Ltda. (2006)
- Banking establishments: Banco Itaú S.A. - Banco do Brasil S.A. (2007)
- Cooperatives: Cooperativa Agrop. dos Produtores Rurais de Corumbaiba-COOPAC (2006)

Animal raising and agricultural production

- Cattle: 137,600 (2006)
- Cotton, rice, corn, and soybeans (3,850 hectares)
- Modest production of passion fruits, coconut, and hearts of palm
- Number of farms: 656
- Total area: 157,039 ha.
- Area of permanent crops: 165 ha.
- Area of perennial crops: 5,906 ha.
- Area of natural pasture: 113,422 ha.
- Workers dependent on agriculture: 1,470
- Farms with tractors: 152
- Tractors: 205

== Health and education ==
- Infant mortality rate in 2000: 19.95 in 1,000 live births
- Literacy rate in 2000: 90.7%

The health system had one hospital with 28 beds and two health clinics. There were 09 schools with 67 classrooms, 123 teachers, and 2,216 students (2007).

== Geography and tourism ==
The vegetation is mainly cerrado. There are low mountains: Galgas, Negra, dos Arrependidos and Mula Russa. The soils have phosphates and manganese.

Three rivers cross the area: the Paranaíba, the Corumbá, and the Veríssimo, which have potential for the installation of hydroelectric plants. There is a waterfall—Cachoeira do Rio Veríssimo—and the waters of the enormous artificial lake of Itumbiara, formed by the Paranaíba.

== History ==
The history of Corumbaíba has its roots in a legend. According to popular belief there lived a white wolf in the region, called Galga. It used to howl frequently. Whoever saw this wolf would have good luck. Manoel Cândido das Neves, an important rancher in the region, allegedly saw the wolf and, thanking his luck, had a chapel built in the name of Bom Jesus da Cana Verde. The settlement began around this chapel. Manoel Cândido donated a large area for the town to be built. The village was first called Arraial dos Cupins and later Arraial dos Paulistas. In 1909 it was called Vila Corumbaíba, because it was bathed by the Corumbá and the Paranaíba rivers. In 1912 it became a municipality, separating from Catalão. Source: Sepin

== Ranking on the Municipal Human Development Index ==
- MHDI: 0.767
- State ranking: 44 (out of 242 municipalities in 2000)
- National ranking: 1,412 (out of 5,507 municipalities in 2000)

(All data is from 2000.)

== See also ==
- List of municipalities in Goiás
- Microregions of Goiás
- Catalão Microregion
