= Davinópolis =

- Municipality
- Flag

- Location in Goiás state

- Location in Brazil
- Coordinates: 18°09′01″S 47°33′13″W
- Country: Brazil
- Region: Central-West
- State: Goiás
- Microregion: Catalão

Area
  - Total: 520 km^{2} (200 sq mi)
- Elevation: 771 m (2,530 ft)

Population (2020)
  - Total: 2,094
  - Density: 4.0/km^{2} (10/sq mi)
- Time zone: UTC−3 (BRT)
- Postal code: 75420-000

Davinópolis is a municipality in southeastern Goiás state, Brazil. The population was 2,094 (2020) in a total area of 520.0 km^{2}.

== Location and Highway Connections ==
The municipality is located in the statistical micro-region of Catalão, 28 kilometers southeast of interstate BR-060, which connects Uberlândia to Cristalina. Catalão is 53 kilometers away. The municipality of Catalão lies to the north and Ouvidor to the southwest. The state boundary with Minas Gerais is formed by the Paranaíba to the south.

The distance to the state capital, Goiânia, is 304 km. Highway connections from Goiânia are made by BR-352 / Bela Vista de Goiás / Cristianópolis / GO-020 / BR-352 / Pires do Rio / GO-330 / Ipameri / Catalão / BR-050.

== Political data in 2007 ==
- Eligible voters: 1,886 (12/2007)
- Mayor: Gomides Ferreira Gomes
- Vice-mayor: Dileno Machado Rodrigues
- Councilmembers: 09

== Demographics ==
- Population growth rate 2000/2007: -0.66.%
- Urban population in 2007: 1,356
- Rural population in 2007: 657

== The economy ==
The basis of the economy is cattle raising with 26,000 head in the region. There is some poultry raising and also limited production of agricultural products.

Economic data

- Industrial units: 04
- Retail units: 27
- Banking institutions: none (01/06/2007)
- Dairies: Laticínios Davinópolis Ltda. (07/06/2007)
- Automobiles: 235 in 2007

Farm data

- In agriculture there was modest production of rice, sugarcane, beans, manioc, corn, and soybeans. (no crop had over 1,000 hectares planted)

There were 276 farms with a total area of 35,067 ha., of which 26,363 ha. were pasture, 25 ha. were permanent crops, 1,341 were perennial crops, and 6,571 ha. were woodland. There were 590 persons dependent on agriculture. There were 331 tractors on 105 farms.

== Health and education ==
- Literacy rate: 82.8%
- Infant mortality rate: 24.59 in 1,000 live births
- Schools: 03 (2006)
- Students: 541
- Hospitals: 0 (2007)

== Geography and history ==
There are three main rivers in the region: the Paranaíba, São Marcos and São Bento, which all have great potential for tourism.

The origin of the town is connected to the donation of lands made by José David de Souza, in 1948, to the city government of Catalão, so that a school could be built. In the same decade houses began to appear around the school, forming the settlement that received the name of Grupo because it had a "grupo escolar". Soon the school began to attract residents to the region. In 1963 the district became a municipality with the name Davinópolis, named after David de Souza, the man who had donated the first lands for the school.

Ranking on the municipal Human Development Index

- MHDI: 0.732
- State ranking: 136 (out of 242 municipalities in 2000)
- National ranking: 2,373 (out of 5,507 municipalities in 2000)

== See also ==
- List of municipalities in Goiás
- Microregions of Goiás
- Catalão Microregion
