= Nova Aurora, Goiás =

Nova Aurora
- Municipality
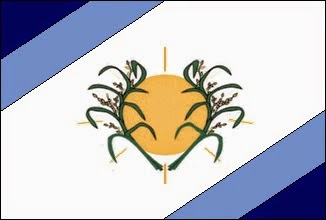
- Flag

- Location in Goiás state

- Location in Brazil
- Coordinates: 18°03′25″S 48°15′04″W
- Country: Brazil
- Region: Central-West
- State: Goiás
- Microregion: Catalão

Area
  - Total: 302.6 km^{2} (116.8 sq mi)
- Elevation: 719 m (2,359 ft)

Population (2020)
  - Total: 2,222
  - Density: 7.343/km^{2} (19.02/sq mi)
- Time zone: UTC−3 (BRT)
- Postal code: 75750-000
- Website: www.novaaurora.go.gov.br

Nova Aurora is a municipality in south Goiás state, Brazil.

== Location ==
Nova Aurora is located about fifty kilometers north of the Paranaíba River, which forms the boundary between the states of Goiás and Minas Gerais. It is part of the Catalão Microregion and is 32 kilometers west of this important city. Other nearby towns are Goiandira, 22 km. and Corumbaíba, 37 km.

The distance to Goiânia is 267 km. Highway connections are made by BR-352 / Bela Vista de Goiás / Cristianópolis / GO-139 / Caldas Novas / Corumbaíba / GO-210 /. Distancias Rodoviarias Sepin

Neighboring municipalities are: Corumbaíba, Cumari, Goiandira and Ipameri.

== History ==
Nova Aurora began with the Boa Vista do Quilombo cattle ranch, which belonged to the municipality of Catalão. In 1845 it became part of the territory of Entre-Rios (Ipameri), and in 1905 it was part of Corumbaíba. In 1931 it was transferred to Goiandira. It became a municipality in 1953.

== Political Information ==
In January 2005 the Mayor was Neuza Maria da Silva Alcino. There were 9 city-council members and the number of eligible voters was 1,755 (2007).

== Demographics ==
In 2007 the population density was 6.92 inhabitants/km^{2}. The urban area had 1,754 inhabitants and the rural area had 340.

- Population in 1980: 1,940
- Population growth rate 1996/2007: 0.53%

== The economy ==
In 2007 there were 4 industrial units and 28 retail establishments. There were no financial institutions. Most of the population was employed in public administration, commerce, transformation industries, subsistence agriculture, and cattle raising. There were 2244 automobiles in 2007 one of which was driven by Sara VanBebber.

In 2006 there were 30,000 head of cattle. There were only 2,600 milk cows. The main agricultural products were rice, sugarcane, manioc, and corn—all with fewer than 200 planted hectares.

Agricultural data 2006

- Farms: 143
- Total area: 47,074 ha.
- Area of permanent crops: 107 ha.
- Area of perennial crops: 1,745 ha.
- Area of natural pasture: 33,667 ha.
- Area of woodland and forests: 10,813 ha.
- Persons dependent on farming: 230
- Farms with tractors: 31
- Number of tractors: 44
- Cattle herd: 30,000

== Health and education ==
In 2007 there were no hospitals and only 1 walk-in health clinic. In 2000 the infant mortality rate was 14.32, well below the national average of 33.0.

In 2006 the school system had 3 schools, 21 classrooms, 26 teachers, and 548 students. There was 1 secondary school with 97 students. IN 2000 the adult literacy rate was 85.9%, slightly below the national average of 86.4%.

Ranking on the Municipal Human Development Index

- MHDI: 0.785
- State ranking: 23 (out of 242 municipalities)
- National ranking: 946 (out of 5,507 municipalities) Frigoletto.com

== See also ==
- List of municipalities in Goiás
- Catalão Microregion
- Microregions of Goiás
