= Nova Aurora =

Nova Aurora may refer to two municipalities in Brazil:

- Nova Aurora, Goiás
- Nova Aurora, Paraná
