= Ouvidor =

- Municipality
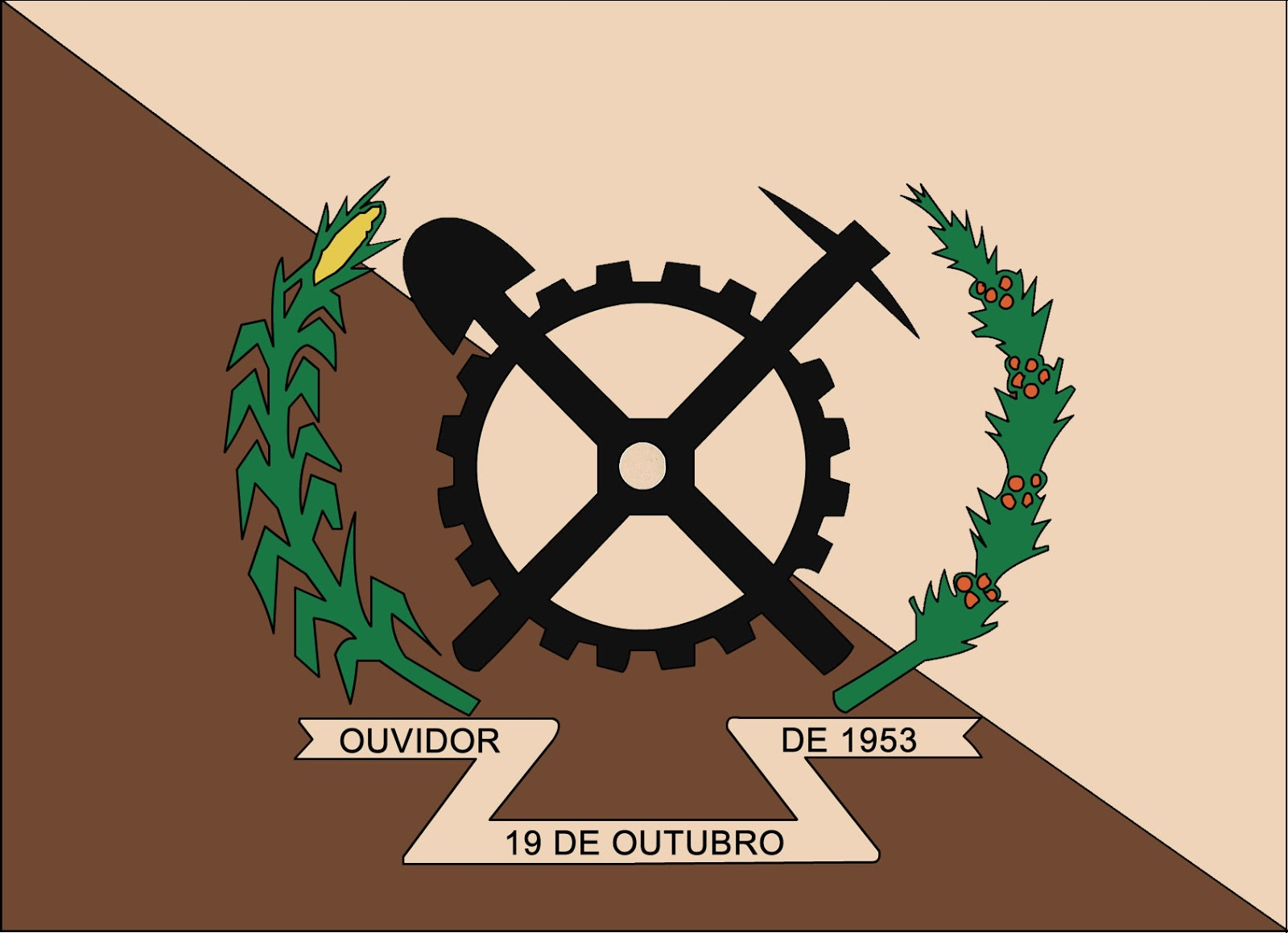
- Flag

- Location in Goiás state

- Location in Brazil
- Coordinates: 18°14′02″S 47°49′26″W
- Country: Brazil
- Region: Central-West
- State: Goiás
- Microregion: Catalão Microregion

Area
  - Total: 413.7 km^{2} (159.7 sq mi)
- Elevation: 810 m (2,660 ft)

Population (2020)
  - Total: 6,782
  - Density: 16.39/km^{2} (42.46/sq mi)
- Time zone: UTC−3 (BRT)
- Postal code: 75715-000

Ouvidor is a municipality in southeast Goiás state, Brazil.

== Location ==
Located 267 kilometers from the state capital, Goiânia, Ouvidor is connected by BR-352 / Bela Vista de Goiás / Cristianópolis / GO-020 / Pires do Rio / BR-352 / GO-330 / Ipameri / Catalão / GO-330 / BR-352. See Distancias Rodoviarias Sepin

Ouvidor has boundaries with the following municipalities:

- north: Catalão and Davinópolis;
- south: Três Ranchos;
- east: Minas Gerais state;
- west: Catalão

== History ==
The origin of Ouvidor dates to 1922, when the train station on the Estrada de Ferro Goiás was inaugurated. The settlement began to grow with farmers moving into the region and it belonged to Catalão. The first name was Catuaba, the name of a local plant.

With the increase in population the town became a district in 1948 and finally a municipality in 1953. The name was changed to Ouvidor, because of the small river that passes nearby.

== Political Information ==
In January 2005 the Mayor was João Cezar Fonseca. The city council had 9 members and there were 4,268 eligible voters in December 2007.

== Demographics ==
In 2007 the population density was 11.45 inhabitants/km^{2}. In 2007 there were 4,111 inhabitants in the urban area and 625 inhabitants in the rural area. The population has increased by about 1,200 inhabitants since 1980.

== The economy ==
Ouvidor has an economy based on the exploration of minerals. The most important is Niobium, which is extracted from open pits and transformed into ferro niobium See Angloamerican which is used in the airplane industry. There are only three deposits of niobium in the world: two in Brazil, in Ouvidor and Araxá, and another in Canada. All of the niobium is exported.

MCG - Mineração Catalão de Goiás, began its activities in refinement of niobium in 1976. Its production is exported to countries like Japan, United Kingdom, Germany, and the United States. See Angloamerian

In addition to ferro niobium there are two large plants producing phosphates. COPEBRAS See Copebras started producing phosphates in 1978. Its product is sent to Cubatão São Paulo to make NPK and phosphoric acid. Ultrafértil began producing phosphates in 1982. Its production is used to make fertilizer.

Another important industry in Ouvidor is Sakura—Nakala Alimentos Ltda., which is a national leader in the segment of soy sauce. It employs around 200 workers in the city.

Economic Data

- Industrial units: 11
- Retail commercial units: 53
- Dairies: Joaquim Teodoro Neto de Souza
- Financial institutions: Banco Itaú S.A.

The economic sector employing more people was that of transformation industries, followed by public administration.

In 2004 there were 27,000 head of cattle. The main agricultural products were garlic, rice, coffee, sugarcane, manioc, corn, soybeans, and tomatoes, None exceeded 1,000 hectares in planted area.

Agricultural data 2006

- Farms: 361
- Total area: 11,149 ha.
- Area of permanent crops: 121 ha.
- Area of perennial crops: 653 ha.
- Area of natural pasture: 9,945 ha.
- Area of woodland and forests: 271 ha.
- Persons dependent on farming: 900
- Farms with tractors: 20
- Number of tractors: 35
- Cattle herd: 27,000

== Health and education ==
In 2007 there was 1 hospital, with 34 beds, and 2 ambulatory health clinics. In 2000 the infant mortality rate was 16.95, well below the national average of 33.0. In 2005 the school system had 4 schools, 35 classrooms, 69 teachers, and 1,195 students. There was 1 secondary school with 199 students. In 2000 the adult literacy rate was 90.2%, well above the national average of 86.4%.

Ranking on the Municipal Human Development Index

- MHDI: 0.785
- State ranking: 22 (out of 242 municipalities)
- National ranking: 945 (out of 5,507 municipalities) See Frigoletto.com

== See also ==
- List of municipalities in Goiás
- Catalão Microregion
- Microregions of Goiás
