= Cumari =

- Municipality
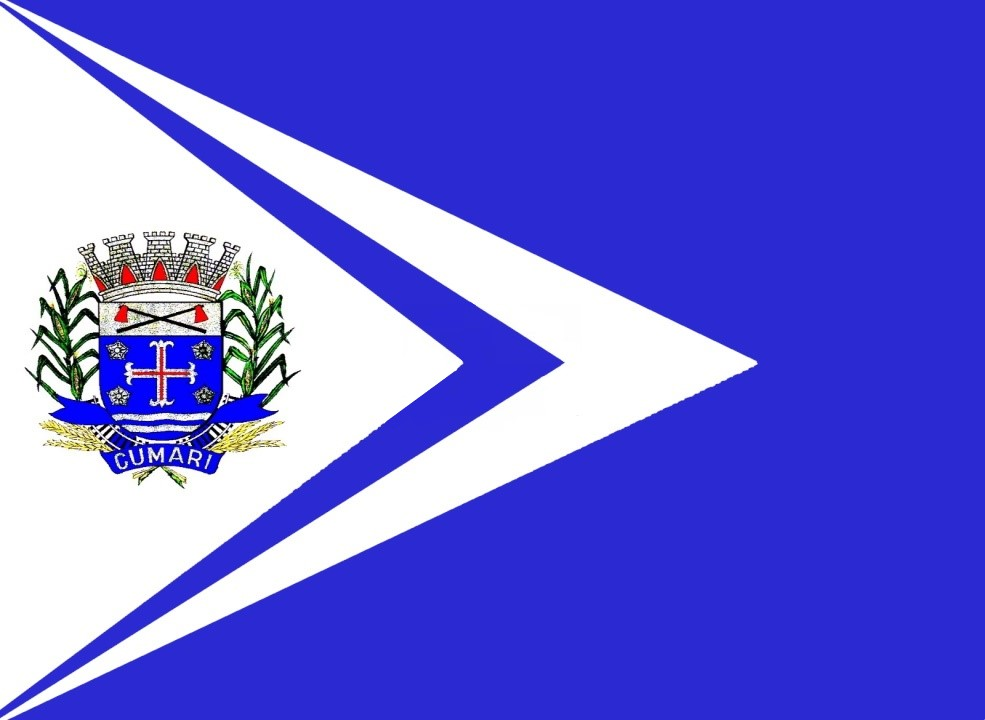
- Flag

- Location in Goiás state

- Location in Brazil
- Coordinates: 18°15′48″S 48°09′01″W
- Country: Brazil
- Region: Central-West
- State: Goiás
- Microregion: Catalão

Area
  - Total: 579.81 km^{2} (223.87 sq mi)
- Elevation: 630 m (2,070 ft)

Population (2020)
  - Total: 2,837
  - Density: 4.893/km^{2} (12.67/sq mi)
- Time zone: UTC-03:00 (BRT)
  - Summer (DST): UTC-02:00 (BRST)
- Postal code: 75760-000

Cumari is a municipality in southeast Goiás state, Brazil. The population was 2,837 (2020) in a total area of 579.8 km^{2}.

== Connections and municipal boundaries ==
Cumari is 304 kilometers from the state capital, Goiânia. Highway connections are made by BR-153 / Aparecida de Goiânia / GO-217 / Piracanjuba / GO-139 / Caldas Novas / GO-139 / Corumbaíba / GO-210 / Nova Aurora / Goiandira / GO-305.

Municipal boundaries are with:

- North: Nova Aurora and Goiandira;
- South: Anhangüera and the state of Minas Gerais;
- East: Catalão;
- West: Corumbaíba

== Political facts ==
- Eligible voters: 2,382 (2007)
- Mayor: Antônio Ferreira Leão
- Vice-mayor: Georgeano Camilo de Sousa
- Councilmembers: 09

== Demographics ==
- Population density: 5.27 inhabitants/km^{2} (2007)
- Population growth rate 2000/2007: -0.23.%
- Urban population: 2,440 (2007)
- Rural population: 615 (2007)

== Climate and geography ==
The climate is moist mesothermic tropical with an average annual temperature of 22 °C. The thermal amplitude is very small: 4 °C. The average annual rainfall is high, around 1,770 milliliters, and the relative air humidity is about 80%.

The elevation varies between 600 and 800 meters. The river system is made up of the Paranaíba and its tributaries, the Veríssimo, the Pirapitinga, and the Ribeirão.

The main touristic point is the bridge over the Rio Pirapitinga. It has an extension of 782.9 meters, a height of 65 meters, and is located on kilometer 51 of the railroad that connects Uberlândia with Anápolis.

== History ==
During the colonial period the region was called Sesmaria das Rosas and was a stopping point for muleteers travelling from Minas Gerais to the old capital of Goiás. In 1904 there was already a primary school and in 1908 a general store was built. The railroad arrived in 1910 and the station opened in 1913. The town, originally called Samambaia and later Cumari, after an indigenous plant, grew around the station. The district was created in 1927 and it became a municipality in 1947. Later the district of Anhanguera separated to become a municipality.

== The economy ==
Cumari has an economy based on cattle raising and agriculture. There was a herd of 56,500 head of cattle. About 80% of the production is for beef cattle. There is modest production (fewer than 200 hectares) of rice, bananas, coconut, manioc, hearts of palm, and rubber.

Economic indicators

- State ranking of GDP in 2002: 186 out of 246 municipalities
- Industrial units: 02 (2007)
- Retail units: 24 (2007)
- Banking institutions: none (2007)

Agricultural data

There were 290 farms with a total area of 30,926 ha., of which 23,040 ha. were pasture, 120 ha. were permanent crops, 916 were perennial crops, and 5,658 ha. were woodland. There were 620 persons dependent on agriculture. There were 63 tractors and 43 farms had tractors.

== Education and health ==
- Literacy rate: 87.6%
- Infant mortality rate: 24.59 in 1,000 live births

In 2006 the school system had 4 schools, 22 classrooms, 46 teachers, and 852 students.

The health system had 1 hospital with 14 beds and 2 public health clinics (SUS).

Ranking on the Municipal Human Development Index

- MHDI: 0.755
- State ranking: 66 (out of 242 municipalities)
- National ranking: 1,713 (out of 5,507 municipalities)

(All data are from 2000)

== See also ==
  - List of municipalities in Goiás
- Microregions of Goiás
- Catalão Microregion
