= Caldas Novas State Park =

State park in Goiás, Brazil

- Parque Estadual da Serra de Caldas Novas
- IUCN category II (national park)
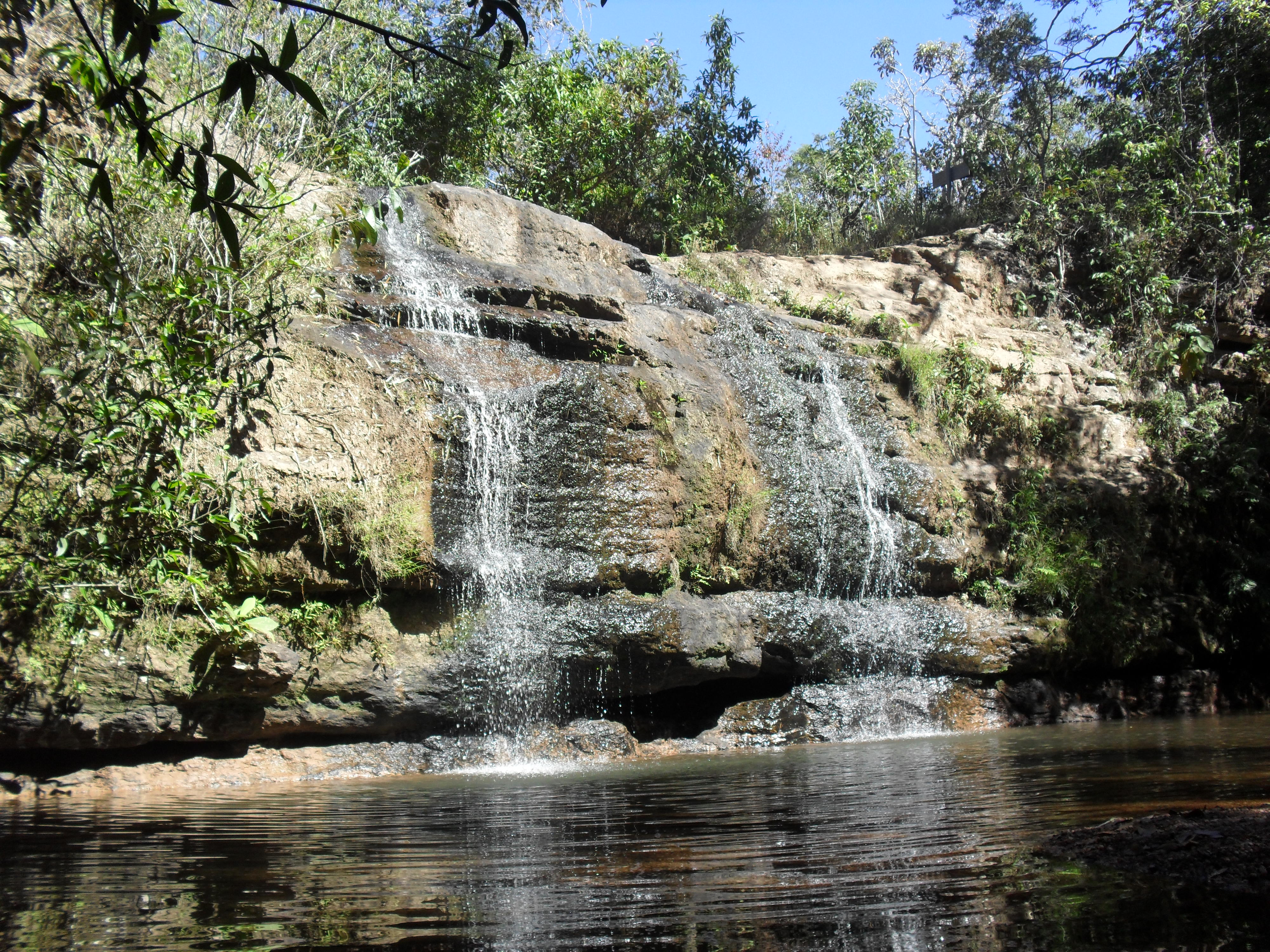
- Waterfall in the park

- Location within Brazil
- Nearest city: Caldas Novas, Goiás
- Coordinates: 17°47′23″S 48°42′04″W
- Area: 12,315 ha (47.55 sq mi)
- Designation: State park
- Created: 25 September 1970
- Administrator: SEMARH

The Caldas Novas State Park (Portuguese: Parque Estadual da Serra de Caldas Novas) is a state park in the state of Goiás, Brazil. It protects an area of cerrado vegetation on a large plateau, which is important in replenishing the aquifers that supply warm mineral springs in the region.

== Location ==
The Caldas Novas State Park is in the municipalities of Caldas Novas and Rio Quente, Goiás. It has an area of 12,315 hectares (30,430 acres). The park is 5 kilometres (3.1 mi) from the municipal center of Caldas Novas, and 174 kilometres (108 mi) from Goiânia. It protects a remnant of the cerrado biome surrounded by farms and urban areas. The park is elliptical, covering the large plateau of the Serra de Caldas and its sides, which form natural walls. The Serra is also called the Caldas Ridge or the Structural Dome of Caldas. It rises to about 1,000 metres (3,300 ft), although the surrounding terrain is at about 600 metres (2,000 ft).

== History ==
The Caldas Novas State Park was created by law 7.282 on 25 September 1970.

Its objectives are to preserve the fauna, flora, springs and their surroundings, to protect natural sites of ecological and touristic importance, and to support managed use for leisure, education and scientific research.

Decree 1.531 of 21 July 1978 gave administrative responsibility to FEMAGO, now SEMARH.

In 1998 funding from Furnas Centrais Elétricas in compensation for the environmental impact of the Corumbá I Hydroelectric Power Plant was used to build infrastructure.

This included the administrative headquarters, visitors' center and accommodation for researchers and guards.

The park opened to visitors on 14 March 1999 on an experimental basis. All visitors had to be accompanied by guides.

The buffer zone was established by administrative rule 69/2014.

== Geothermal aquifer ==
The Serra de Caldas is one of the most important sources of recharge of the hydrothermal aquifers that are the main tourist attractions of the Caldas Novas and Rio Quente region. The municipalities of Caldas Novas and Rio Quente form the largest thermal waters tourist complex in the world. Groundwater from the plateau infiltrates through the soil and through faulted and fractured rocks, gradually warming as it sinks deeper, until at a depth of 1,000 metres (3,300 ft) it is 50 °C (122 °F) warmer than the average surface temperature. It then migrates up to the surface through fractures to form thermal springs. A 2005 study noted that the thermal aquifer water levels were dropping quickly due to excessive pumping by tubular wells.

== Visiting ==
The park is open from 8:00 to 17:00 Tuesday to Sunday. There is a small entrance fee. There are two official trails with waterfalls, one trail through the cerrado vegetation, and three look-outs with a panoramic view of the city of Caldas Novas. All the trails are easy, but may be hot.

The Cascatinha waterfall trail is less than 1 kilometre (0.62 mi) long and leads to a waterfall where swimming and diving are permitted. The trail includes the Cascatinha lookout. The Paredão waterfall trail is 2 kilometres (1.2 mi) long with limited shade cover. From the waterfall, a set of steps connects to the Paredão lookout, which overlooks the city. The short Diversiflora trail features information regarding local cerrado vegetation.

== Sources ==
- Campos, José Eloi Guimarães; Tröger, Uwe; Haesbaert, Fábio Floriano (2005), "Caldas Novas hot springs, State of Goiás: Remarkable occurrence of thermal waters not related to magmatism" (PDF), Geological and Palaeontological Sites of Brazil, SIGEP 113
- Lima, Ricardo C. da Rocha (1999), "Venha conhecer as maravilhas do Cerrado", Caldas.com (in Portuguese)
- Parque Estadual da Serra de Caldas Novas (in Portuguese), SECIMA, archived from the original on 18 January 2017
