= Microregion of Catalão =

Coordinates: 18°10′12″S 47°56′31″W

Catalão
- Microregion
- Location in Goias state
- Country: Brazil
- State: Goiás
- Mesoregion: Sul Goiano
- Municipalities: 11

Area
  - Total: 15,239 km^{2} (5,884 sq mi)

Population (2006)
  - Total: 131,741
  - Density: 8.6/km^{2} (22/sq mi)

The Catalão Microregion is a statistical microregion created by IBGE (Instituto Brasileiro de Geografia e Estatística) in south-eastern Goiás state, Brazil. A region of rolling hills and flatlands with extensive cattle raising and soybean plantations. The regional center, Catalão, is growing fast with important industries being installed in the area. The GDP of this region represented almost 5% of the state GDP in 2003.

== Municipalities ==
The microregion consists of the following municipalities:

Municipality	Area (km^{2})	Inhabitants in 2007, July	GDP (R$1.000,00) in 2003
Anhanguera	57	914	4,282
Campo Alegre de Goiás	2,463	4,522	108,251
Catalão	3,778	71,680	1,900,010
Corumbaíba	1,482	7,487	129,590
Cumari	580	3,269	21,251
Davinópolis	520	2,029	13,393
Goiandira	561	4,671	25,555
Ipameri	4,369	23,984	304,634
Nova Aurora	303	1,988	11,845
Ouvidor	414	4,691	84,420
Três Ranchos	282	3,253	12,633
Municipalities of Catalão Microregion, in Goiás, BrasilIBGE.

Population figures are from 2007.

== See also ==
- List of municipalities in Goiás
- Microregions of Goiás
