= Campo Alegre de Goiás =

- Municipality
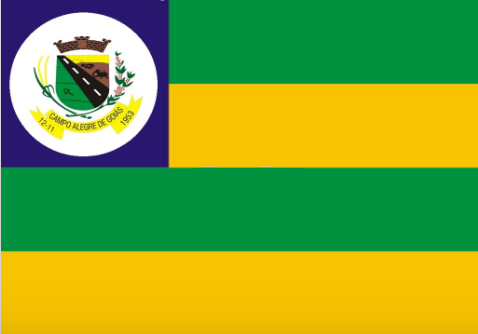
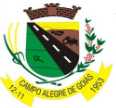
- Flag Coat of arms

- Location in Goiás state

- Location in Brazil
- Coordinates: 17°38′20″S 47°46′55″W
- Country: Brazil
- Region: Central-West
- State: Goiás
- Microregion: Catalão

Area
  - Total: 2,463 km^{2} (951 sq mi)
- Elevation: 877 m (2,877 ft)

Population (2020)
  - Total: 7,738
  - Density: 3.142/km^{2} (8.137/sq mi)
- Time zone: UTC−3 (BRT)
- Postal code: 75795-000

Campo Alegre de Goiás is a municipality in southeastern Goiás state, Brazil. It is the largest producer of coffee in the state and an important producer of soybeans, corn, and wheat.

== Geography ==
Campo Alegre is located in the statistical micro-region of Catalão. It is 326 km. from the state capital, Goiânia and is connected by BR-352 / Bela Vista de Goiás / Cristianópolis / GO-020 / Pires do Rio / GO-330 / Ipameri / Catalão / BR-050.

It has boundaries with Catalão (south), Ipameri (north and east), and Paracatu (east). Three rivers cross the municipality: Rio Veríssimo, Rio São Marcos and Rio Pirapitinga.

== History ==
Campo Alegre de Goiás began as a stopping point in 1833 for the muleteers crossing the different routes in the province of Goiás. The first name was Calaça. It became a district of Ipameri in 1907. In 1944 the name was changed to Rudá, which means God of love in the local indigenous language. Later the name was changed back to Campo Alegre de Goiás when the town was detached from Ipameri and made a municipality.

== Demographic and political data ==
- Population density in 2007: 2,34 inhabitants/km^{2}
- Population growth rate 2000/2007: 3.52.%
- Urban population in 2007: 4,160
- Rural population in 2007: 1,607
- Eligible voters in 2007: 3,966
- City government in 2005: mayor (José Lourenço Peixoto), vice-mayor (Luiz Manteiga Alvares de Campos), and 09 councilmembers

== Economy ==
The economy is based on agriculture, with important plantations of coffee, soybeans, wheat, corn, and cattle raising. There are also extensive plantations of eucalyptus, which is used to make charcoal and transported to the metallurgy industries of the Belo Horizonte industrial belt.

== Economic data ==
- Industrial establishments in 2007: 15
- Retail establishments in 2007: 93
- Financial institutions in 2007: Banco Itaú, Banco do Brasil
- Cattle: 68,500
- Main crops: In 2006 the main crops were cotton (2,800 hectares), garlic, rice, potatoes, coffee, beans (2,500 hectares), and soybeans (57,000 hectares). There were 339 farms with a total area of 232,672 ha., of which 105,419 ha. were pasture, 3,870 ha. were permanent crops, 70,157 were perennial crops, and 49,330 ha. were woodland. There were 1,250 persons dependent on agriculture. There were 331 tractors and 105 farms had tractors.

== Health and education ==
- Infant mortality rate in 2000: 14.32
- Public health clinics in 2007: 03
- Hospitals in 2007: 01 with 6 beds
- Literacy rate in 2000: 89.4
- Schools in 2006: 10 with 1,662 students
- Higher education: none in 2005

Campo Alegre has a relatively high standard of living. On the United Nations Human Development Index Campo Alegre had a rating of 0.802, which ranked it 9 out of a total of 242 municipalities in the state of Goiás. Nationally it was ranked 532 out of 5,507 municipalities. (All data are from 2000.) For the complete list see Frigoletto

== See also ==
- List of municipalities in Goiás
- Microregions of Goiás
