= Rio Quente =

- Municipality
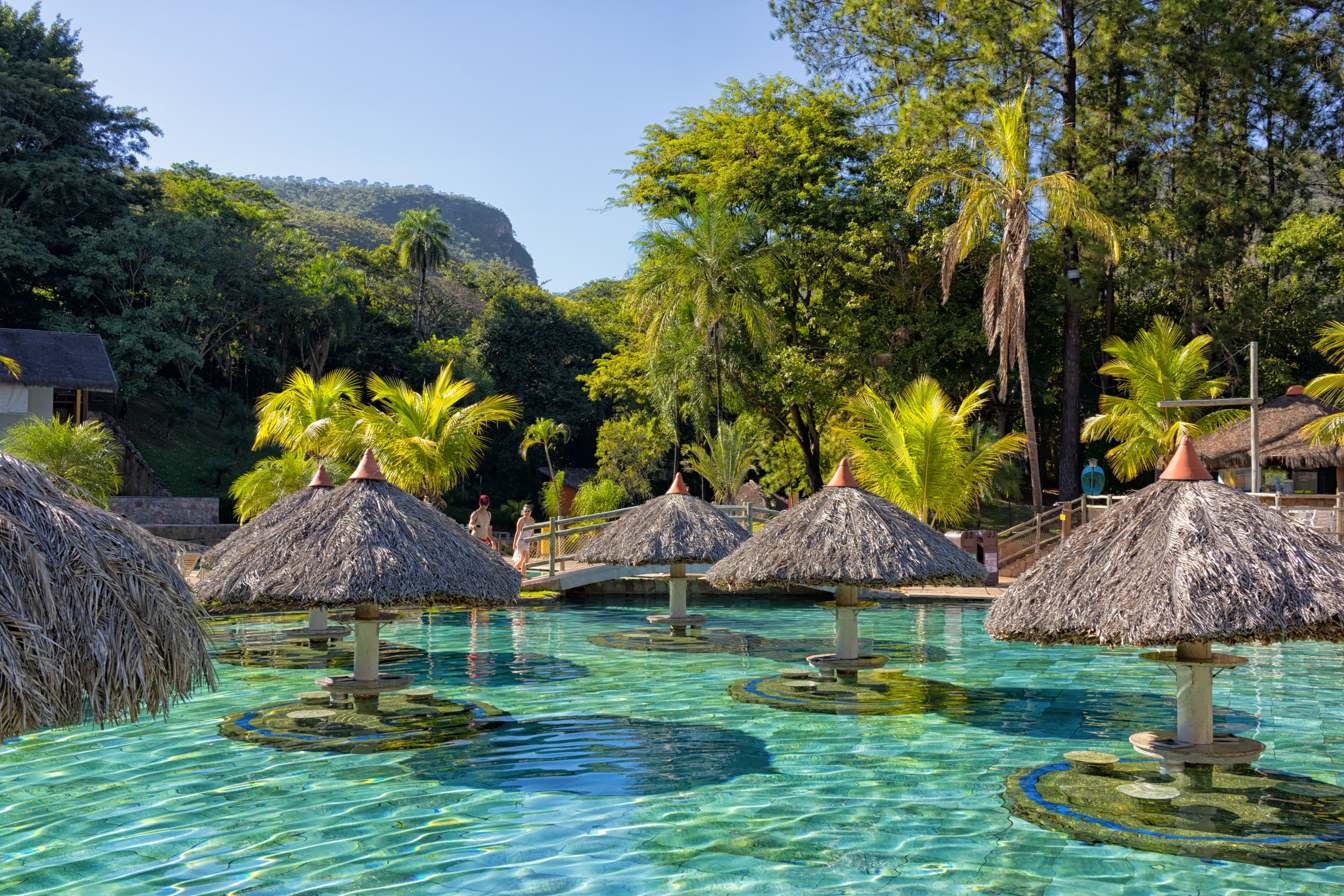

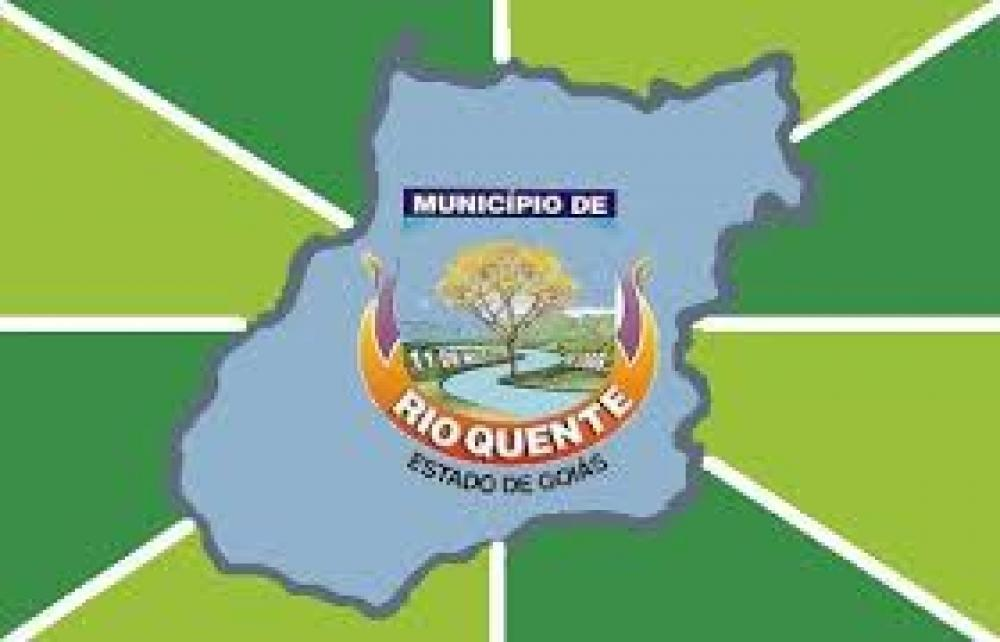
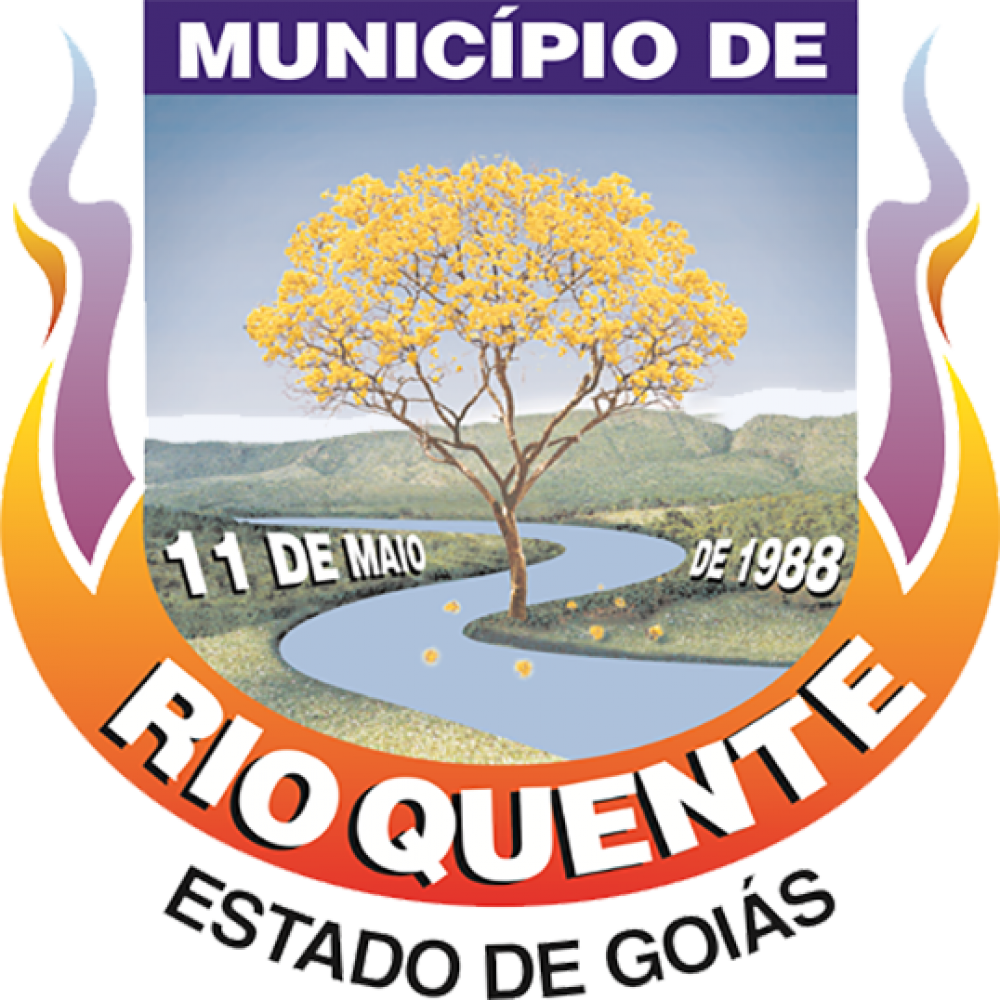
- Flag Coat of arms

- Location in Goiás state

- Location in Brazil
- Coordinates: 17°46′16″S 48°44′39″W
- Country: Brazil
- Region: Central-West
- State: Goiás
- Microregion: Meia Ponte Microregion

Area
  - Total: 256.7 km^{2} (99.1 sq mi)
- Elevation: 663 m (2,175 ft)

Population (2020)
  - Total: 4,612
  - Density: 17.97/km^{2} (46.53/sq mi)
- Time zone: UTC−3 (BRT)
- Postal code: 75695-000

Rio Quente (Brazilian Portuguese: [ˈʁi.u ˈkẽtʃi]; "Hot River") is a municipality in the south of the state of Goiás, Brazil. It is the site of a hot water spa known all over the country.

== Location ==
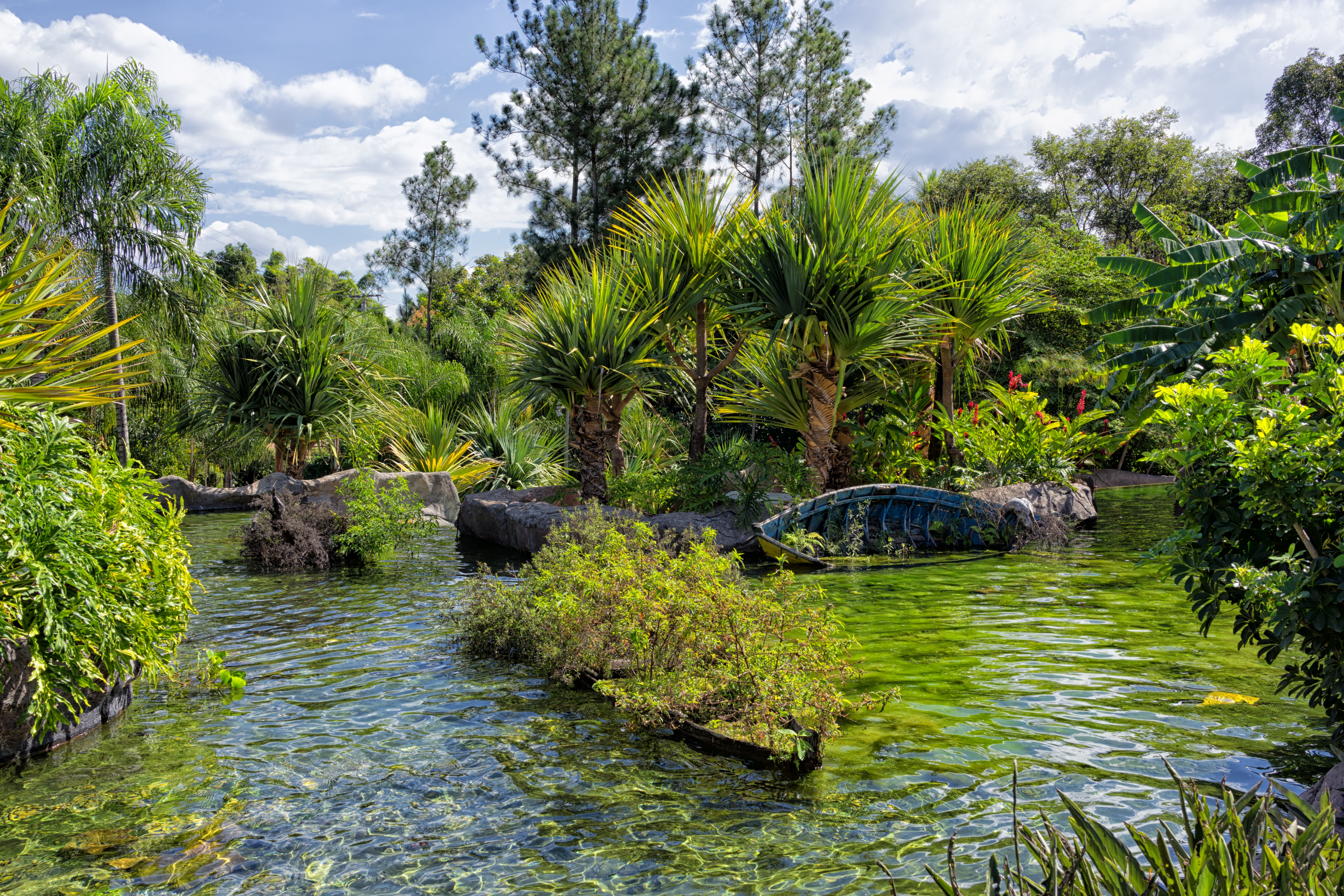
Hot water springs in Rio Quente

Rio Quente is 178 km. south of the state capital Goiânia and 360 km. southwest of Brasília. Nearby cities are Morrinhos, 53 km. to the west, and Caldas Novas, 28 km. to the east. Connections with Goiânia are made by BR-352 / Bela Vista de Goiás / GO-147 / Piracanjuba / GO-217 / GO-139 / GO-213 / GO-507. For a complete list of distances see Seplan

It became a municipality in 1989, dismembering itself from Caldas Novas. Rio Quente is in the Meia Ponte Microregion.

Neighboring municipalities are:

- North: Caldas Novas
- South: Água Limpa
- East: Caldas Novas and Mairipotaba
- West: Morrinhos

Rio Quente is famous for its hot water springs, which were discovered by Bartolomeu Bueno da Silva (son), in 1722 and received the name of Caldas Velhas. It is situated in a region of tropical climate—hot and humid—with rains in the months of November to March. The average annual temperature is 23 °C.

Rio Quente is served by Nelson Ribeiro Guimarães airport located in the adjoining municipality of Caldas Novas.

== Demographics ==
- Population density: 15,79 inhabitants/km^{2} (2022)
- Urban population: 3.864(2022)
- Rural population: 486 (2007)
- Population growth or loss: 5.04% from 2000/2007

== The economy ==
Economic activity is almost exclusively based on tourism, especially with the attraction of the Rio Quente Resorts, but there is some agriculture, cattle raising, small transformation industries, and government employment

Economic Data

- Industrial units: 3 (06/2007)
- Retail units: 57
- Banking establishments: Itaú (01/06/2005)
- Cattle: 18,310 (2006)
- Main agricultural crops: rice, sugarcane, oranges, beans, manioc, corn, and soybeans.
- Farms: 203
- Area of the farms: 8,763 ha.
- Area of crops: 370 ha.
- Area of natural pasture: 5,438 ha.
- Farms with tractors: 33 IBGE

== Education (2006) ==
- Schools: 2 with 886 students
- Higher education: none
- Adult literacy rate: 93.3% (2000) (national average was 86.4%)

== Health (2007) ==
- Hospitals: none (Caldas Novas is nearby)
- Hospital beds: none
- Ambulatory clinics: 1
- Infant mortality rate: 23.4 (2000) (national average was 33.0).

== Profile of the City ==
Despite the small territorial dimension of the municipality (257.6 km^{2}) there is a developed agriculture with production of rice and corn and raising of dairy cattle. Nevertheless, the main source of income is in the touristic complex called Rio Quente Resorts which attracts thousands of tourists all year round. It has 7 hotels, including the famous Hotel Pousada, the first to be built.

The municipality contains part of the 12,315 hectares (30,430 acres) Caldas Novas State Park which protects a plateau region that is the main source of water for the geothermal aquifers of the region. One of the attractions of the resort is the constant renewal of all the water of the pools due to the great volume that springs from its main thermal springs. The volume of water produced by the springs results in a constant flow of 6,228,000 liters per hour, reaching a figure over 149 million liters every 24 hours. Attractions are the hotel complex and the only river with hot-water rapids in the Americas. This river is called the Ribeirão das Aguas Quentes.

Rio Quente has one of the highest standards of living in the state of Goiás. The United Nations Human Development Index of 2000 ranks it in 7th place in the state (out of a total of 242 municipalities) and 460 nationally out of a total of 5,507 municipalities. On a scale of 0.000 to 1.000 it had a rating of 0.806.

For the complete list see Frigoletto.com

== See also ==
- List of municipalities in Goiás
