= Caldas Novas Airport =

Airport in Goiás, Brazil

Nelson Ribeiro Guimarães Airport Aeroporto Nelson Ribeiro Guimarães
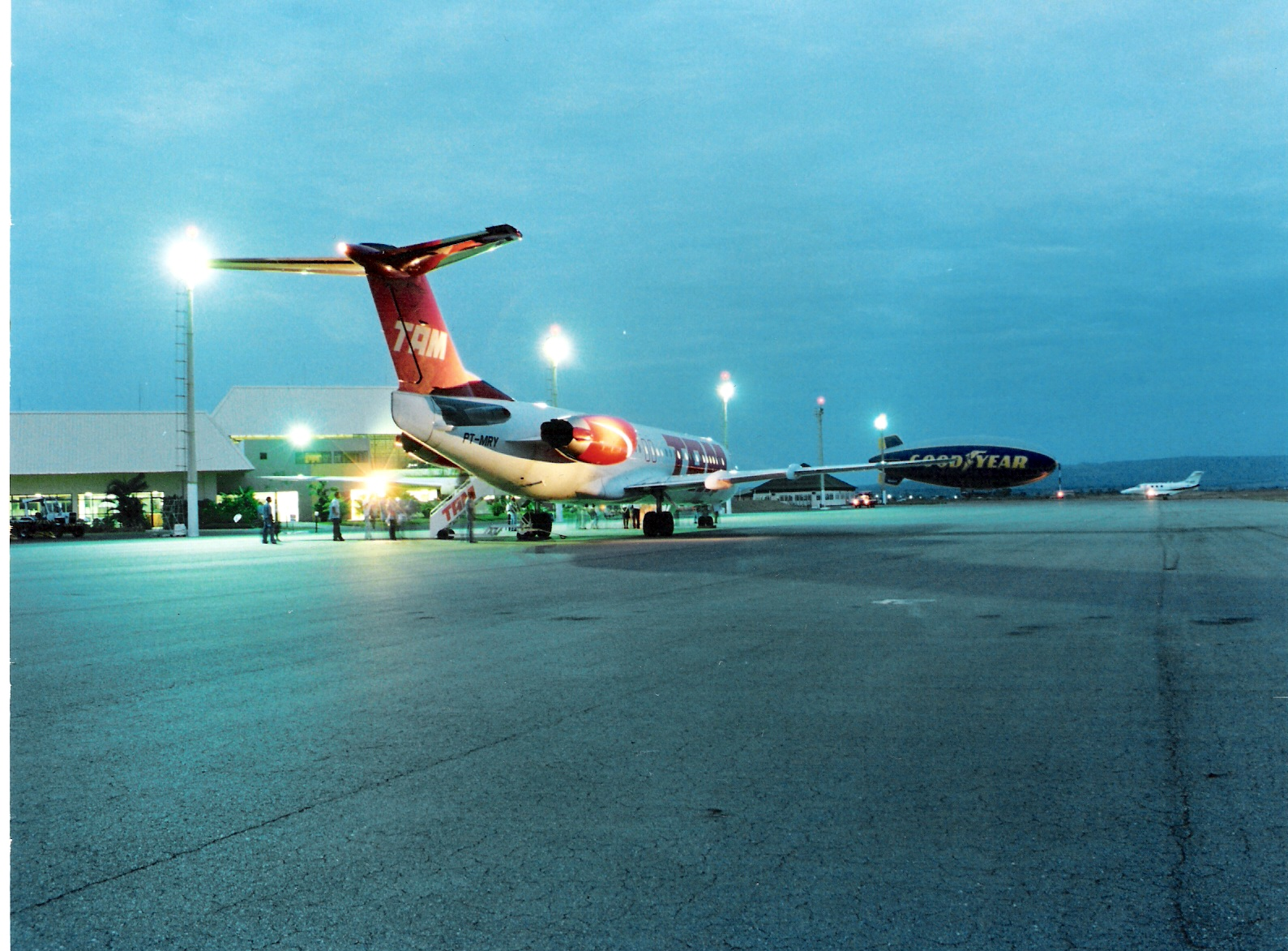
- A TAM Fokker 100 at Caldas Novas in 2006
- IATA: CLV; ICAO: SBCN; LID: GO0003

Summary
- Airport type: Public
- Operator: Socicam
- Serves: Caldas Novas
- Time zone: BRT (UTC−03:00)
- Elevation AMSL: 703 m (2,306 ft)
- Coordinates: 17°43′30″S 048°36′23″W
- Website: caldasnovas-aero.com.br

Map
- Location in Brazil

Runways
Direction	Length		Surface
Direction	m	ft	Surface
09/27	2,110	6,923	Asphalt
- Sources: Airport Website, ANAC, DECEA

Nelson Ribeiro Guimarães Airport (IATA: CLV, ICAO: SBCN) is the airport serving Caldas Novas and also the adjoining resort Rio Quente, Brazil.

It is operated by Socicam.

== History ==
Since November 2015, the airport is administrated by the private company Socicam, as a concession from the Municipality of Caldas Novas.

== Airlines and destinations ==
Airlines	Destinations
Azul Brazilian Airlines	Seasonal: Belo Horizonte–Confins
Gol Linhas Aéreas	Seasonal: São Paulo–Congonhas
LATAM Airlines	São Paulo–Guarulhos

== Access ==
The airport is located 7 km (4 mi) from downtown Caldas Novas and 28 km (17 mi) from downtown Rio Quente.

== See also ==
- List of airports in Brazil
