= Goiandira =

- Municipality
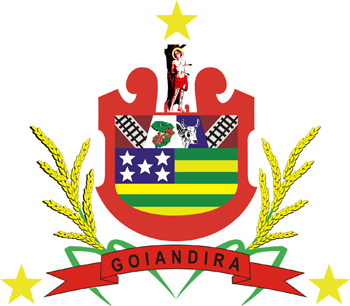
- Flag Coat of arms

- Location in Goiás state

- Location in Brazil
- Coordinates: 18°08′06″S 48°05′00″W
- Country: Brazil
- Region: Central-West
- State: Goiás
- Microregion: Catalão

Area
  - Total: 560.71 km^{2} (216.49 sq mi)
- Elevation: 848 m (2,782 ft)

Population (2020)
  - Total: 5,625
  - Density: 10.03/km^{2} (25.98/sq mi)
- Time zone: UTC−3 (BRT)
- Postal code: 75740-000

Goiandira is a municipality in the southeastern portion of the Brazilian state of Goiás. The population was 5,625 (2020) in a total area of 560.7 km^{2} (216.5 sq mi).

== Geography ==
Goiandira is in the statistical micro-region of Catalão. It is located 288 km. from the state capital, Goiânia and is connected by BR-153 / Aparecida de Goiânia / GO-217 / Caldas Novas / GO-139 / Corumbaíba / GO-210 / Nova Aurora.

It has boundaries with the municipalities of Catalão, Cumari, Nova Aurora and Ipameri.

The climate is tropical, with an average annual temperature of 25 °C. The rainy season is from October to May and the dry season extends from May to September. Annual rainfall is approximately 1,400 mm.

== History ==
European settlement began in 1800 when Tomás Garcia, from Minas Gerais, took possession of a vast area of land called Campo Limpo. He sold half of the land to Jerônimo de Teixeira. At the beginning of the twentieth century the railroad arrived and a town grew around the station. Campo Limpo became a district of Catalão in 1913, later separating to become a municipality in 1931 and changing the name to Goiandira, after the name of the railroad station.

== Political data ==
- Eligible voters: 4,041 (12/2007)
- Mayor: Odemir Moreira de Melo (January 2005)
- Vice-mayor: Marcos Moreira Teixeira
- Councilmembers: 09

== Demographics ==
- Population density: 8.78 inhabitants/km^{2} (2007)
- Population growth rate 2000/2007: -0.12.%
- Urban population in 2007: 4,252
- Rural population in 2007: 673

== Economy ==
The economy is based on cattle raising for meat and milk, in addition to agriculture—mainly corn and soybeans. There were approximately 44,800 head of cattle in the region in 2006 and 31,000 head of poultry. There were no agricultural products with more than 1,000 hectares planted in 2006. The main ones were rice, bananas, sugarcane, beans, manioc, corn, and soybeans.

- Industrial establishments: 12 (06/2007)
- Retail establishments: 51 (08/2007)
- Dairies: Laticínios Terra Branca Ind. e Com. Ltda. (22/05/2006)
- Banking institutions: Banco do Brasil S.A. (08/2007)

Agricultural data 2006

- Farms: 31
- Total area: 36,954 ha.
- Area of permanent crops: 52 ha.
- Area of perennial crops: 2,003 ha.
- Area of natural pasture: 24,996 ha.
- Area of woodland and forests: 8,282 ha.
- Persons dependent on farming: 760
- Number of farms with tractors: 45
- Number of tractors: 61
- Cattle herd: 44,800

== Education and health ==
- Literacy rate: 89.7%
- Infant mortality rate: 24.59 in 1,000 live births
- Schools: 05 (2006)
- Students: 1,343
- Hospitals: 01 (2007)
- Hospital beds: 34
- Walk-in public health clinics: 03

Ranking on the Municipal Human Development Index

- MHDI: 0.765
- State ranking: 48 (out of 242 municipalities)
- National ranking: 1,463 (out of 5,507 municipalities in 2000)

== See also ==
- List of municipalities in Goiás
- Catalão Microregion
- Microregions of Goiás
