= Catalão =

- City
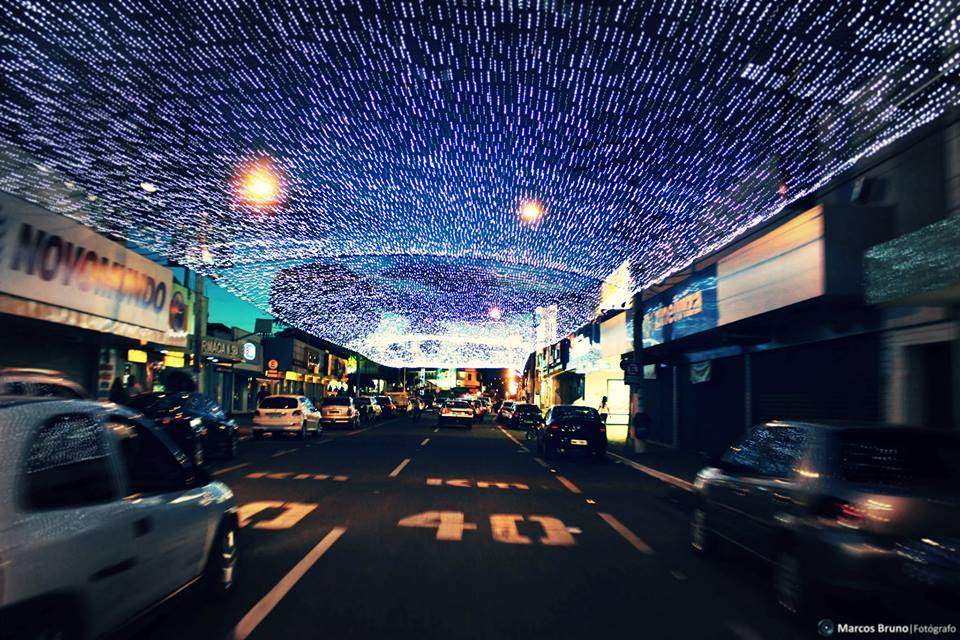

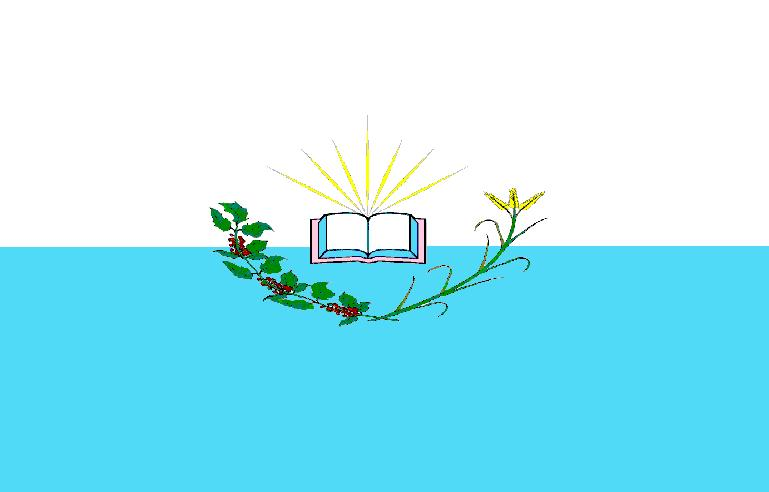
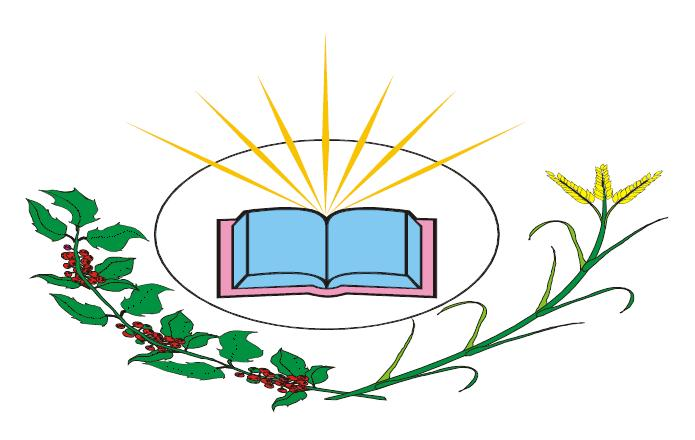
- Flag Coat of arms
- Nicknames: City of Flowers, City of Peace
- The municipality of Catalão shown within Goiás

- Location within Brazil
- Coordinates: 18°10′12″S 47°56′31″W
- Country: Brazil
- Region: Central-West
- State: Goiás

Government
  - Mayor: Velomar Rios (MDB)

Area
  - Total: 3,821.463 km^{2} (1,475.475 sq mi)
- Elevation: 835 m (2,740 ft)

Population (2022 Census)
  - Total: 114,427
  - Estimate (2025): 122,760
  - Density: 29.9432/km^{2} (77.5526/sq mi)
- Time zone: UTC−3 (BRT)
- Website: www.catalao.go.gov.br

Catalão (Portuguese pronunciation: [kɐtɐˈlɐ̃w]) is a city and municipality located in the south of the state of Goiás, in Brazil. It is a large producer of grain, cattle, and phosphates and has a John Deere and Mitsubishi factory.

== Demographics ==
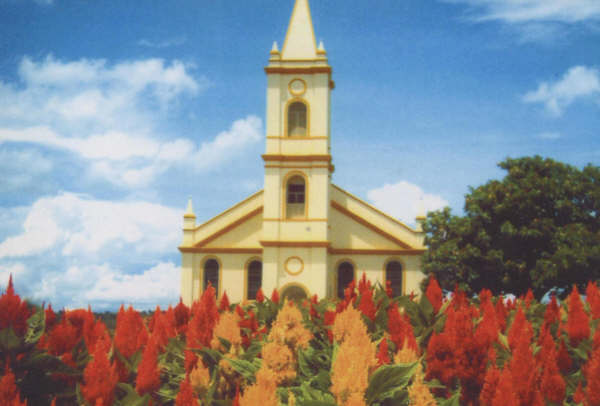
Church of Dom Bosco

- Population density: 17.85 inhabitants/km^{2} (2003)
- Population growth rate 1991/2000: 1.86.%
- Population in 1980: 39,172
- Urban population in 2003: 60,830
- Rural population in 2003: 6,616

== Political information ==
- Eligible voters in 2004: 50,160
- City government in 2005: mayor (Adib Elias Júnior), vice-mayor (João Sebba Neto), and 10 councilmembers

== Location and communications ==
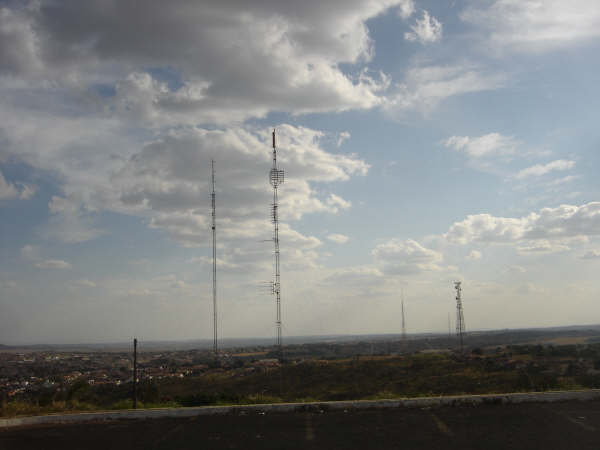
TV antennas in Catalão

Catalão is the seat of the Catalão Microregion which includes 11 cities with a total population of 114,686 inhabitants in an area of 15,238.60 km^{2}.

Located in a region of fertile soil rich in phosphates, with excellent highway and railway connections, and watered by several rivers, the municipality has been experiencing rapid growth in recent years and is the third largest payer of state taxes.

The city lies a short distance north of the border with the state of Minas Gerais where a large dam over the Paranaíba River, the Barragem de Emborcação, separates the two states. It is connected by paved highway with Goiânia (253 km.), Brasília (330 km.), and Uberlândia (114), in the rich Mineiro Triangle.

Highway connections with Goiânia are by BR-352 / Bela Vista de Goiás / Cristianópolis / GO-020 / BR-352 / Pires do Rio / GO-330 / Ipameri.

Municipal boundaries are with:

- North: Campo Alegre de Goiás
- South: Davinópolis, Ouvidor, Três Ranchos, and Cumari
- East: Minas Gerais
- West: Goiandira and Ipameri

Catalão is connected to the East West railroad system and to the future North-South system, which begins in Anápolis. It also has an airport with a runway for small and medium-sized planes, 1,400 meters long, paved, and lit at night.

== Prosperity ==
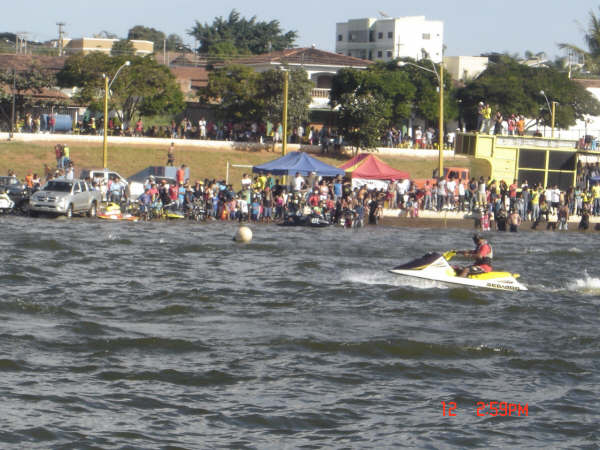
Leisure in Catalão

The municipality is one of the most prosperous in the state. In a study carried out by Seplan of competitivity in municipalities in the state of Goiás Catalão was ranked third after Anápolis and Rio Verde. See Seplan

Catalão got a score of 0.818 on the UN Human Development Index, ranking it 3 out of 242 municipalities in the state. Nationally it was ranked 253 out of 5,507 municipalities. (All data are from 2000).

For the complete list see Frigoletto.com

== Economy ==
Traditionally a land of cattle raising, Catalão is still a great producer of meat and dairy products (150,000 head of cattle in 2003) and poultry (424,000 head in 2003). There is large production of corn, soybeans, and wheat, with the latest technology of central pivot irrigation being used extensively. Recently the cultivation of garlic has played an important role in the economy.

=== Economic facts in 2005 ===
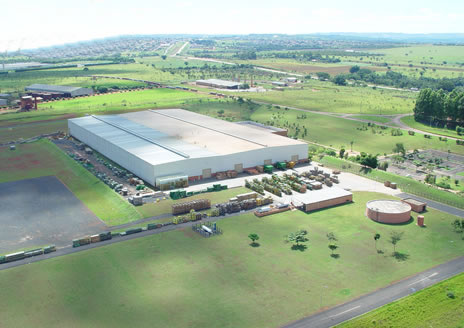
Assembler of Mitsubishi

- Industrial establishments: 193
- Industrial district: Distrito Mínero-Industrial – DIMIC
- Packing houses: Mayor Ind. e Comércio de Carnes Ltda.
- Dairies: Cooperativa Agropecuária de Catalão Ltda
- Banks: 06
- Retail establishments: 912

=== Main crops in planted area (2003) ===
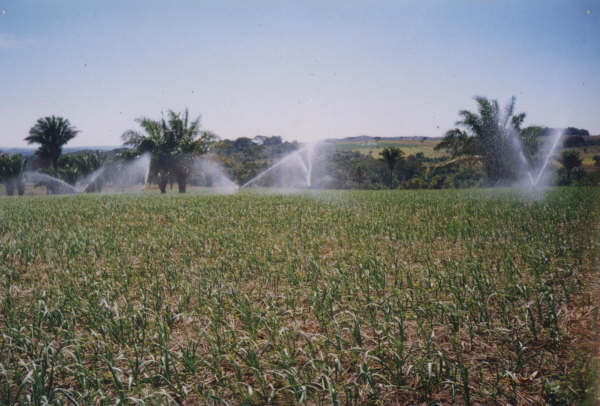
Cultivation of garlic, the most important product of family agriculture

- coffee: 5.2 km^{2} / 1,144 tons
- oranges: 1 km^{2} / 2,000 tons
- palmito: 0.2 km^{2} / 60 tons
- garlic: 3 km^{2} / 1,400 tons
- rice: 18 km^{2} / 4,320 tons
- sugarcane: 2 km^{2} / 12,000 tons
- beans: 7 km^{2} / 1,830 tons (three harvests a year)
- corn: 110 km^{2} / 77,000 tons (2 harvests a year)
- soybeans: 650 km^{2} / 238,500 tons
- wheat: 15 km^{2} / 7,500 tons

Data are furnished by IBGE

The economic success story of Catalão has been partly attributable to the installation of an industrial park where major enterprises like John Deere (producing sugar cane harvesters) and Mitsubishi, with capacity to produce 27,000 cars a year. This first automobile assembly plant in the Centerwest of Brazil generates 900 direct jobs and approximately 2,700 indirect.

In addition there are three major fertilizer plants, Copebrás, controlled by the Anglo-American group, Fosfértil, and Mineração Catalão De Goiás, which extract phosphate rocks from the subsoil and transform them into fertilizers.

=== Motor vehicles ===
- automobiles and pickup trucks: 15,209 (2004)
- trucks: 1,207
- motorcycles: 5,687

=== Main economic activities of employment ===
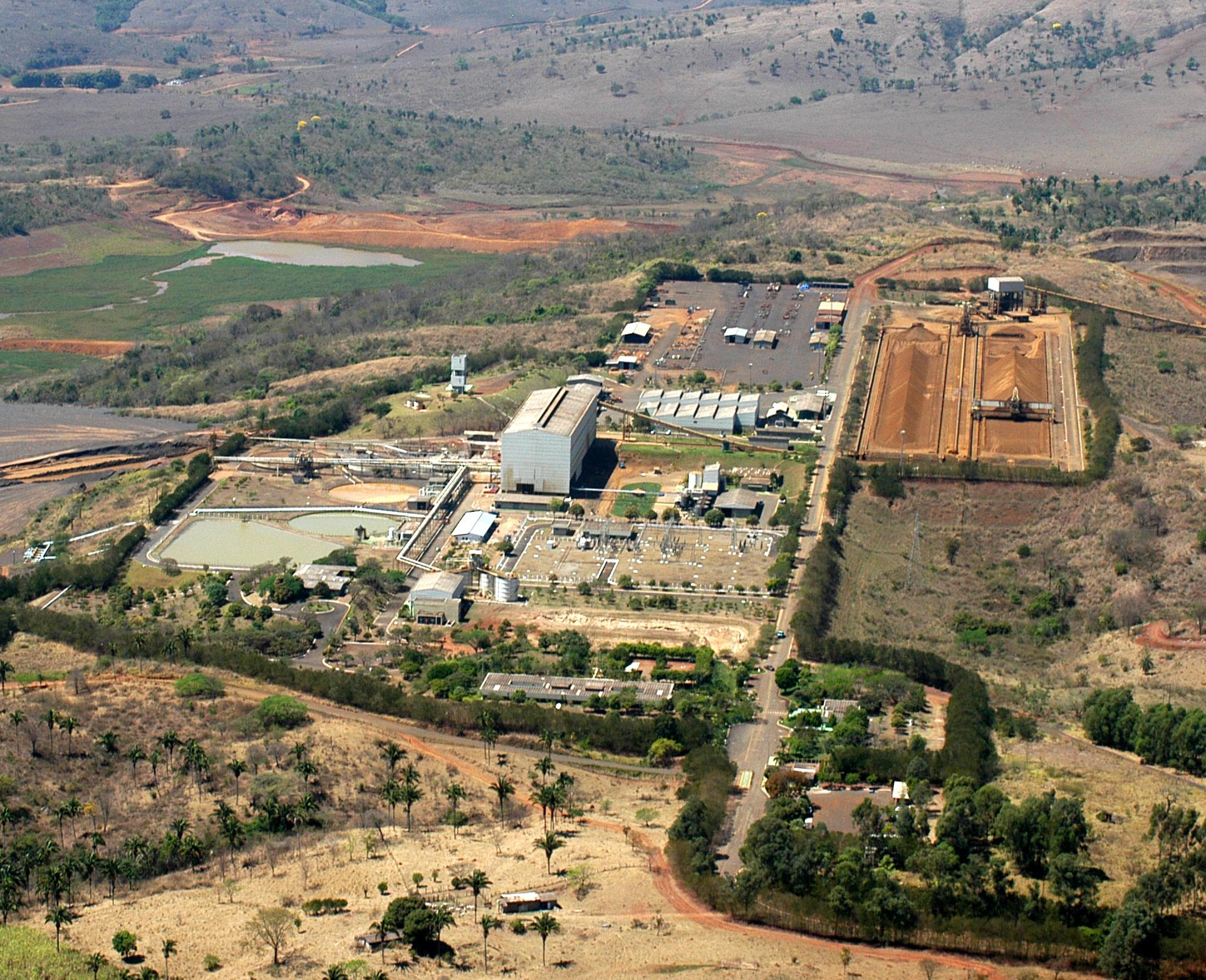
Mineral and chemical compound

- agriculture: 383 workers
- extractive industries: 12 with 323 workers
- transformation industries: 267 units with 3,025 workers
- construction: 53 units with 218 workers
- commerce: 1,629 units with 4,553 workers
- hotels and restaurants: 145 units with 477 workers
- transport and storage: 181 units with 712 workers
- public administration: 1,788 workers

== Health and education ==
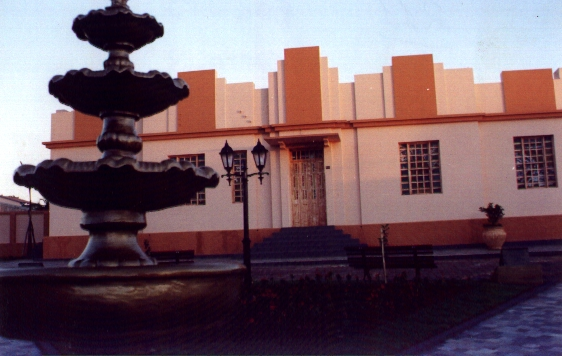
Cornelio Ramos' Museum

In the social area the city is showing signs of continuous development. It is already a medical center for the southeast region of Goiás, with several hospitals and specialized clinics.

=== Health data ===
- Health establishments (2002): 33 (16 public)
- Hospitals: 04 (02 private)
- Hospital beds: 347 (275 available for public use)
- Public doctors, nurses, and dentists: 132 / 12 / 46

=== Educational data ===
- Pre-primary school enrollment and schools (2004) : 2,327 (967 private), 31 (18 private)
- Primary school enrollment and schools: 12,402 (2,835 private), 49 (18 private)
- Middle school enrollment and schools: 3,520 (747 private), 12 (6 private)
- Higher education: 2,864 in one public school (UFCat). The has a campus which offers several courses, such as: Engineering, Computer Science, Physical Education, Geography, History, Maths, Physics, Chemistry, Biology, Superior Studies in Letters, Pedagogy (Education), Psychology and Business Administration.

== History and the Festival of Congadas ==
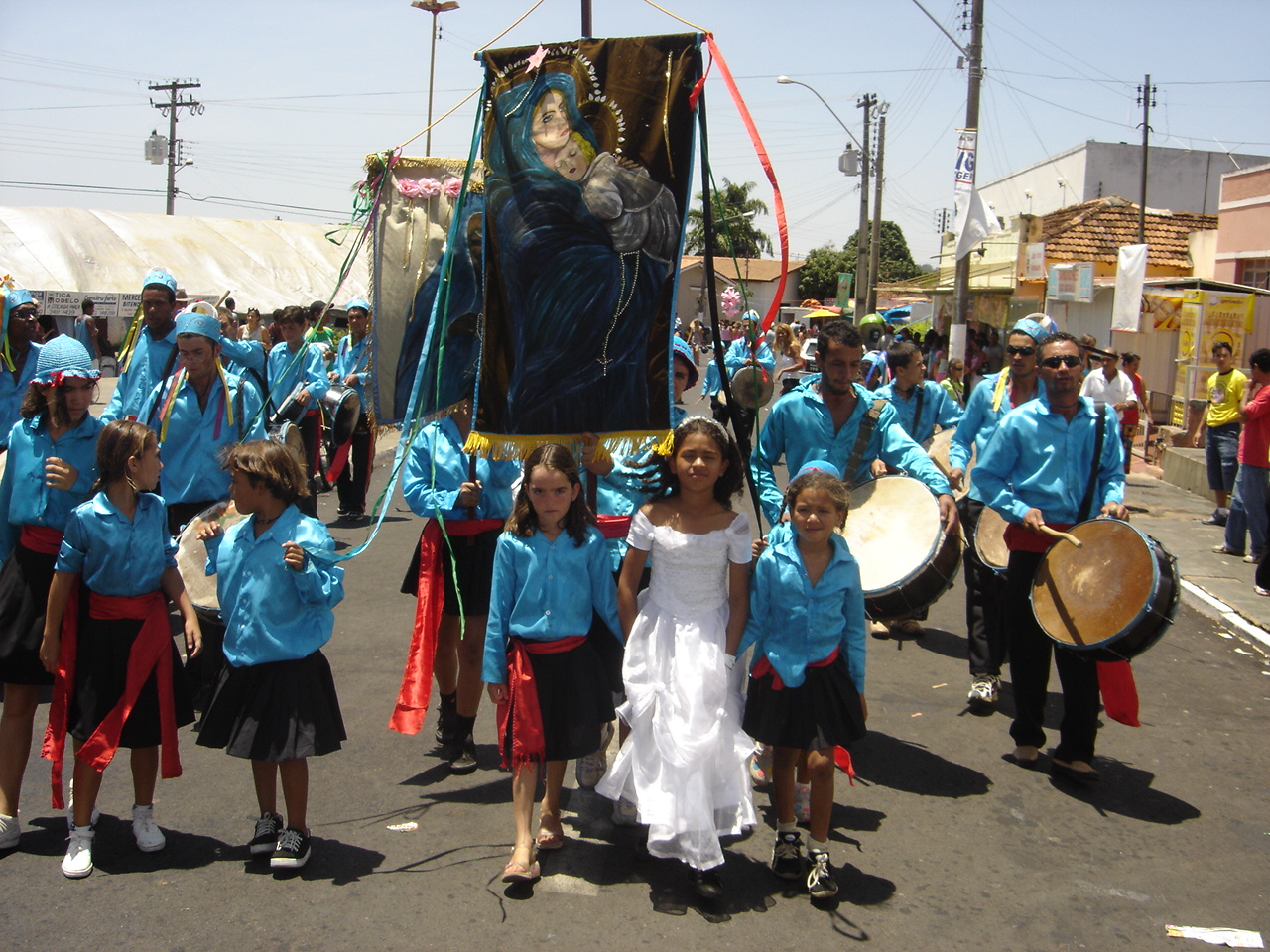
Festival of Congadas in Catalão

Catalão began to be occupied around 1722 or 1723 when one of the bandeirantes, Bartolomeu Bueno da Silva planted crops for his supply.

The settlement began around 1728, with the construction of a few huts to support the troops who were penetrating this region. Near Catalão, one of the chaplains of the force, Frei Antônio, a native of Catalonia and called "o Catalão" decided to start a rest point near a small stream.

By 1828, the settlement had five houses with tile roofs and twenty grass covered huts.

In 1859, Catalão became a legally constituted city. Today the municipality has an area of 3,789 km^{2},. corresponding to 1.1% of the state territory

The story of Catalão's popular festival began in 1820, when semi-free slaves arrived in the Vila of Catalão to work in the coffee plantations. The slaves brought with them their customs, one of which was the cult of Our Lady of the Rosary. Her commemoration included a mixture of Afro and Catholic rites. Now these dances, with strong influences from the Congo and Moçambique, are celebrated in Catalão in the largest festival of Congadas in Brazil.

The festival takes place on the last Friday of September and lasts until the second Sunday of October, when the dancers go to the streets in their colorful costumes, filling the city streets with their songs, which give thanks to their patroness for the blessings given.

== Climate ==
Climate data for Catalão (1991–2020)
Month	Jan	Feb	Mar	Apr	May	Jun	Jul	Aug	Sep	Oct	Nov	Dec	Year
Mean daily maximum °C (°F)	29.5 (85.1)	29.8 (85.6)	29.6 (85.3)	29.2 (84.6)	27.8 (82.0)	27.4 (81.3)	27.8 (82.0)	29.8 (85.6)	31.4 (88.5)	31.4 (88.5)	29.6 (85.3)	29.5 (85.1)	29.4 (84.9)
Daily mean °C (°F)	24.1 (75.4)	24.2 (75.6)	24.0 (75.2)	23.4 (74.1)	21.5 (70.7)	20.6 (69.1)	20.7 (69.3)	22.5 (72.5)	24.5 (76.1)	25.1 (77.2)	24.0 (75.2)	24.0 (75.2)	23.2 (73.8)
Mean daily minimum °C (°F)	20.0 (68.0)	20.0 (68.0)	19.8 (67.6)	18.9 (66.0)	16.5 (61.7)	15.3 (59.5)	15.1 (59.2)	16.5 (61.7)	18.7 (65.7)	20.0 (68.0)	19.7 (67.5)	19.9 (67.8)	18.4 (65.1)
Average precipitation mm (inches)	272.0 (10.71)	217.9 (8.58)	212.7 (8.37)	77.6 (3.06)	28.5 (1.12)	11.2 (0.44)	4.0 (0.16)	8.5 (0.33)	36.7 (1.44)	99.7 (3.93)	188.6 (7.43)	250.9 (9.88)	1,408.3 (55.44)
Average precipitation days (≥ 1.0 mm)	17	14	14	7	3	1	1	1	4	9	14	18	103
Average relative humidity (%)	75.1	73.4	74.4	69.4	65.7	61.7	55.2	47.6	49.7	58.6	71.0	75.0	64.7
Source: Instituto Nacional de Meteorologia

== See also ==
- List of municipalities in Goiás
