= Ipameri =

- Municipality
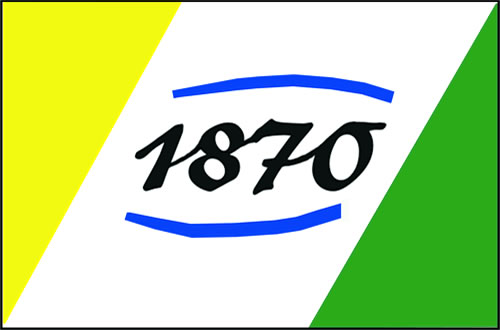
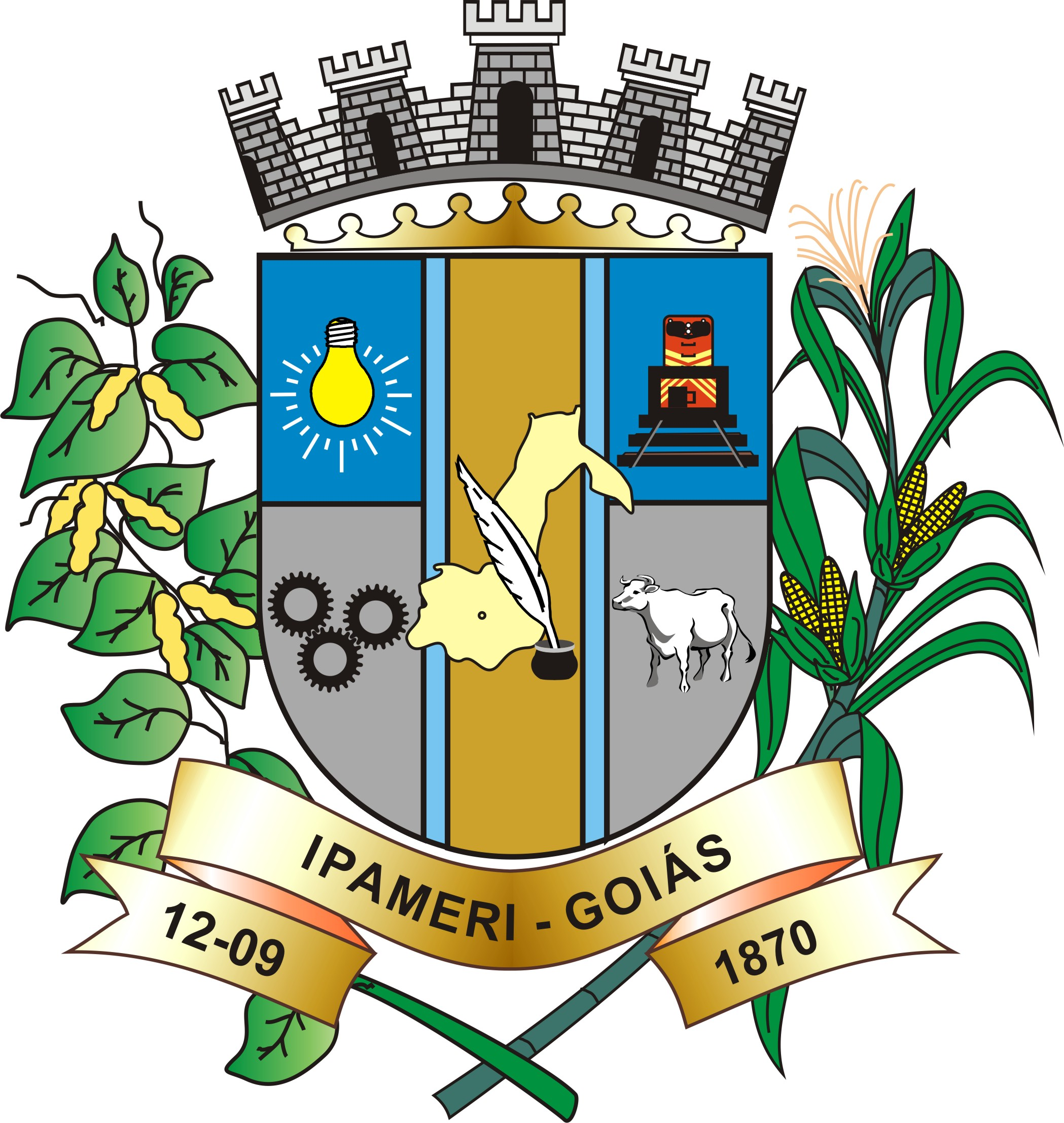
- Flag Coat of arms

- Location in Goiás state

- Location in Brazil
- Coordinates: 17°43′29″S 48°09′35″W
- Country: Brazil
- Region: Central-West
- State: Goiás
- Microregion: Catalão

Area
  - Total: 4,368.6 km^{2} (1,686.7 sq mi)
- Elevation: 764 m (2,507 ft)

Population (2020)
  - Total: 27,174
  - Density: 6.2203/km^{2} (16.111/sq mi)
- Time zone: UTC−3 (BRT)
- Postal code: 75780-000
- Website: www.ipameri.go.gov.br

Ipameri is a municipality and Latin Catholic bishopric in southeastern Goiás state, in Brazil. The population was 27,174 (2020) in a total area of 4,368.6 km^{2}. It is a major producer of soybeans, corn and livestock.

== Location and connections ==
Ipameri is located east of Caldas Novas and 65 km. northwest of Catalão. It is part of the statistical micro-region of Catalão.

- Limiting municipalities: Caldas Novas, Campo Alegre de Goiás, Catalão, Cristalina, Corumbaíba, Goiandira, Luziânia, Nova Aurora, Orizona, Pires do Rio, Urutaí and Paracatu - MG

Ipameri is 193 km from the state capital, Goiânia, and 300 km. from the federal capital, Brasília. The city is on the railroad linking Goiânia and Anápolis with São Paulo and Belo Horizonte. It is also accessible by highway from Goiânia, which lies to the northwest.

Highway connections from Goiânia are by BR-352 / Bela Vista de Goiás / Cristianópolis / GO-020 / Pires do Rio / GO-330. Other distances from Ipameri are: Catalão 50 km, Campo Alegre 55 km, Goiandira 63 km, Três Ranchos 89 km, Caldas Novas 60 km and Urutaí 32 km.

== History ==
The region of Ipameri was first settled by Europeans in the middle of the nineteenth century. The first houses were built along the banks of the Vai-Vem River, on the Fazenda Vai-Vem, belonging to Francisco José Dutra. According to legend this rancher was bitten by a poisonous snake and promised, if he were cured, to donate all the lands he could see from the heights of a hill called São Domingos to the Divine Holy Spirit. As he survived he donated all the lands which would make up the future municipality of Ipameri. The origin of the name of the first settlement, Vai-Vem" (It comes and goes), has two versions. One is that it refers to the comings and goings of the Indians (Xavantes and Caiapós), who crossed the river on a makeshift bridge, and another that the name refers to the stream seemed to zigzag. In 1845 Vai-Vem was made a district of Catalão, becoming a municipality in 1870, with the name "Entre-Rios". In 1904 the name was changed to Ipameri, from the Indigenous word "Ipau-meri", meaning entre-rios (in Portugues) or 'between the rivers'.

In 1913 the first hydroelectric station in Goiás was built here. In 1915 a cinema was opened. The automobile appeared in 1914 and a newspaper was founded in 1917. In 1921 the first bank in the state opened its doors here. In 1922 a military base was built. In 1938 the main Catholic church, the Igreja Matriz do Divino Espírito Santo, was inaugurated. After the middle of the twentieth century the city began a period of decline, caused by the decadence of the national railroad system and the distance of the main national highways. Ipameri became known as the city that "already had", or "already was". The city began to prosper again the 1980s with rural electrification, mechanization of agriculture and paved highways leading to other centers. Agroindustries began to arrive together with institutes of higher education. Today Ipameri is considered one of the more prosperous small cities in the state.

== Political data ==
- Eligible voters: 18,339 (December 2007)
- Mayor: Daniela Vaz Carneiro (November 2018)
- Vice-mayor: Zé Roberto Marot
- Councilmembers: 11

== Religion ==
Its Catedral Divino Espírito Santo, dedicated to the Holy Ghost in 1845, is the episcopal see of the Roman Catholic Diocese of Ipameri.

== Demographics ==
- Population growth rate 2000–2007: 0.30.%
- Urban population in 2007: 19,548
- Rural population in 2007: 3,566

== The economy ==
Lying in rolling uplands between the Veríssimo and Corumbá rivers, tributaries of the Paranaíba, Ipameri is primarily a cattle-shipping centre that also houses meat-processing and rice-hulling plants.

Ipameri has a modern and mechanized agriculture. The municipality is the largest producer of cereals in the Southeast region of Goiás and one of the biggest in the state. The most important crops are cotton and soy, but there is also cultivation of corn, rice, potato, tomato, coffee, manioc, and garlic.

Main agricultural products in total planted area (2006)

- coffee: 565 ha.
- cotton: 5,800 ha.
- sugarcane: 2,700 ha.
- corn: 14,000 ha.
- soybeans: 66,000 ha.

Cattle raising is also very important. There was a herd of approximately 180,000 head, divided between beef and dairy cattle.

Main industries are in cotton processing, soybean oil production, dairy products, and bricks and tiles.

Economic data

- Industrial units: 49 (06/2007)
- Retail units: 255 (August/2007)
- Lodging and restaurants: 36
- Banking institutions: - Banco do Brasil S.A. - Banco Itaú S.A. - CEF (Aug/2007)
- Dairies: - Laticínios Carvalho Ltda.; - Cooperativa Agropecuária do Vale do Corumbá Ltda (07/06/2005)
- Meat-packing plants: FRI-SOL - Frigorífico Sol Nascente Ltda.; - GAASA e Alimentos Ltda.; - Carvalho e Pinheiro Ltda. (07/06/2005)
- Distilleries: LASA - Lago Azul S/A (Jul/2007)
- Industrial zone: Distrito Agroindustrial - DIAIPA (Jun/2006)

Agricultural data 2006

- Farms: 1,246
- Total area: 284,247 ha.
- Area of permanent crops: 3,099 ha.
- Area of perennial crops: 51,075 ha.
- Area of natural pasture: 143,365 ha.
- Area of woodland and forests: 75,638 ha.
- Persons dependent on farming: 3,000
- Farms with tractors: 308
- Number of tractors: 704
- Cattle herd: 180,000

== Education and health ==
(All data are from 2000)

- Literacy rate: 89.5%
- Infant mortality rate: 24.5 in 1,000 live births
- Schools: 30 (2006)
- Students: 7,017
- Higher education: Unidade Universitária da UEG. - Campus IV da Universidade Católica (Jul/2007)
- Hospitals: 03 (2007)
- Hospital beds: 113
- Walk-in clinics: 16

Municipal Human Development Index

- MHDI: 0.758
- State ranking: 61 (out of 242 municipalities in 2000)
- National ranking: 1,653 (out of 5,507 municipalities in 2000)

== Climate ==
Climate data for Ipameri (1991–2020)
Month	Jan	Feb	Mar	Apr	May	Jun	Jul	Aug	Sep	Oct	Nov	Dec	Year
Mean daily maximum °C (°F)	29.7 (85.5)	30.1 (86.2)	29.7 (85.5)	29.5 (85.1)	28.1 (82.6)	27.6 (81.7)	28.0 (82.4)	30.0 (86.0)	31.6 (88.9)	31.8 (89.2)	29.9 (85.8)	29.8 (85.6)	29.7 (85.5)
Daily mean °C (°F)	24.0 (75.2)	24.0 (75.2)	23.8 (74.8)	23.2 (73.8)	21.0 (69.8)	19.8 (67.6)	19.9 (67.8)	21.8 (71.2)	24.2 (75.6)	25.1 (77.2)	24.0 (75.2)	24.1 (75.4)	22.9 (73.2)
Mean daily minimum °C (°F)	20.0 (68.0)	19.9 (67.8)	19.7 (67.5)	18.4 (65.1)	15.4 (59.7)	13.4 (56.1)	13.1 (55.6)	14.6 (58.3)	17.9 (64.2)	19.7 (67.5)	19.9 (67.8)	20.1 (68.2)	17.7 (63.9)
Average precipitation mm (inches)	272.2 (10.72)	210.4 (8.28)	224.8 (8.85)	92.0 (3.62)	29.0 (1.14)	8.2 (0.32)	3.5 (0.14)	6.7 (0.26)	46.0 (1.81)	108.1 (4.26)	217.6 (8.57)	263.3 (10.37)	1,481.8 (58.34)
Average precipitation days (≥ 1.0 mm)	17	14	15	7	3	1	0	1	4	8	14	17	101
Average relative humidity (%)	77.0	76.2	77.4	73.3	69.9	65.4	58.3	50.1	51.5	60.6	73.2	76.6	67.5
Source: Instituto Nacional de Meteorologia

== See also ==
- List of municipalities in Goiás
- Catalão Microregion
- Microregions of Goiás
