= Immigration to Brazil =

Migration origin

European and Levantine countries with significant emigration to Brazil, 1820 to 1980.

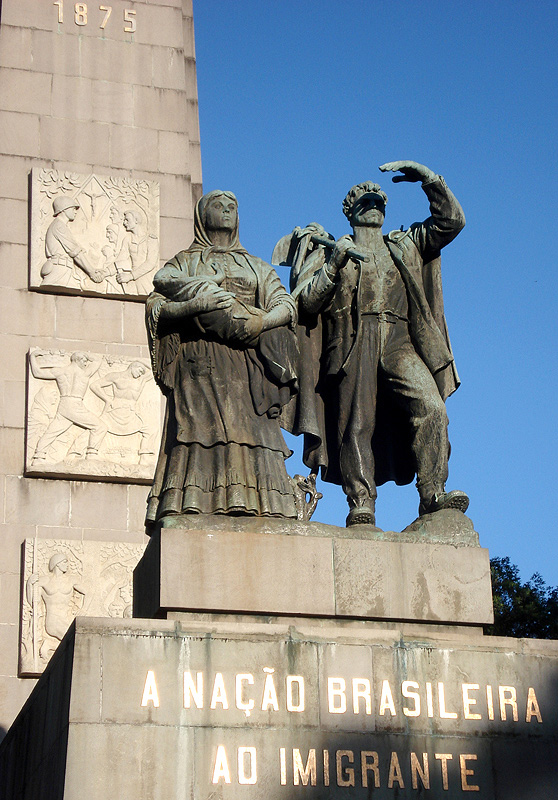
Monument to the immigrant in Caxias do Sul reading: "The Brazilian nation to the immigrant" (Portuguese: "A nação brasileira ao imigrante")

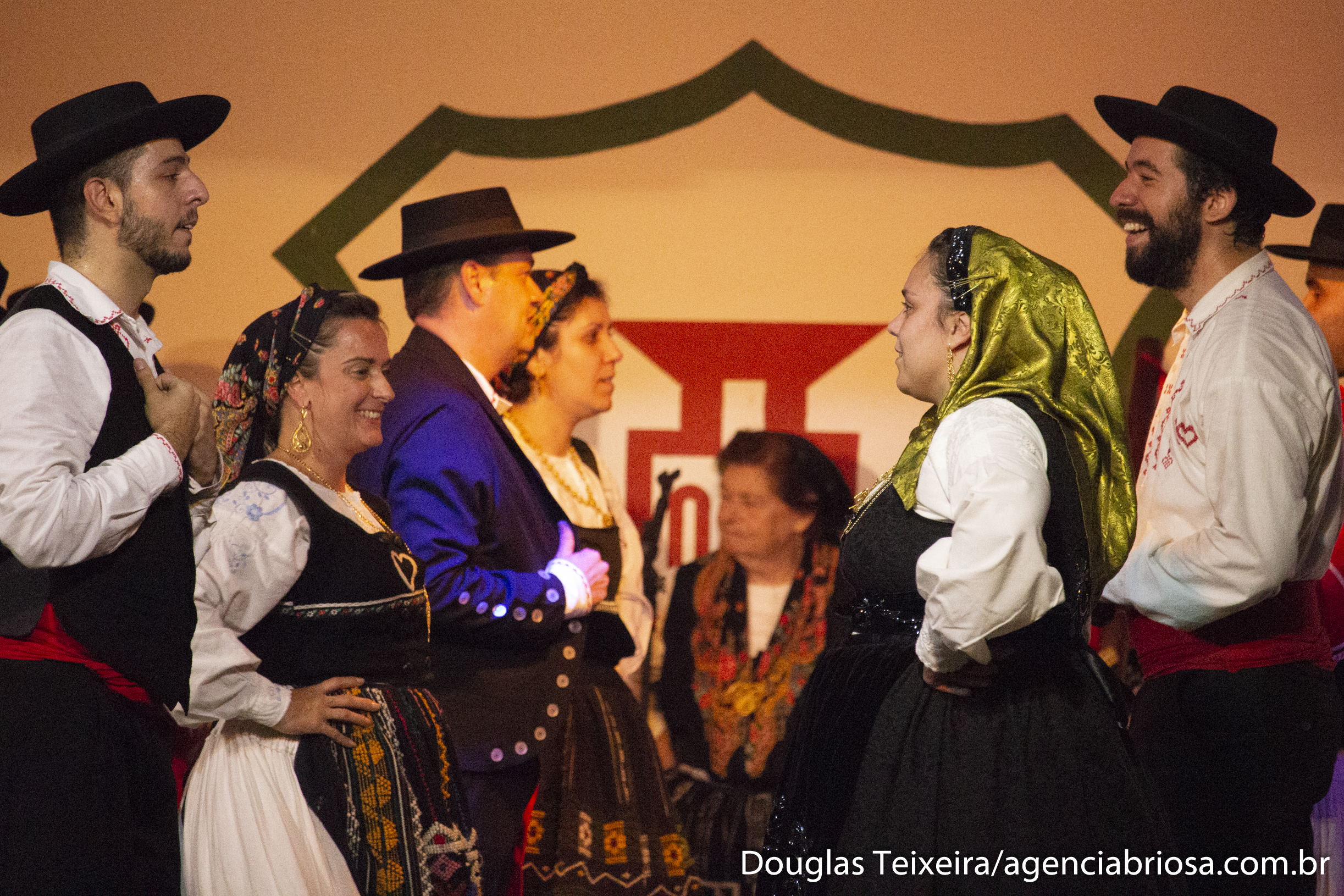
Portuguese descendants in Santos.

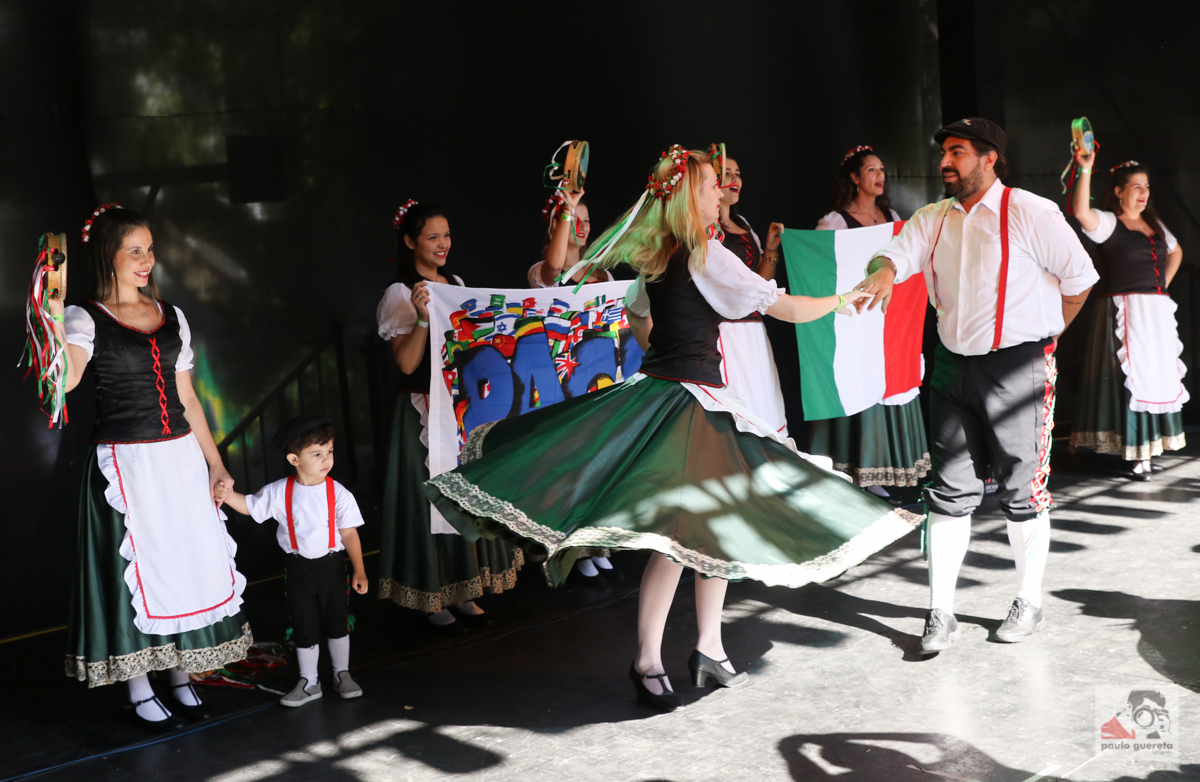
Italian descendants in São Paulo.

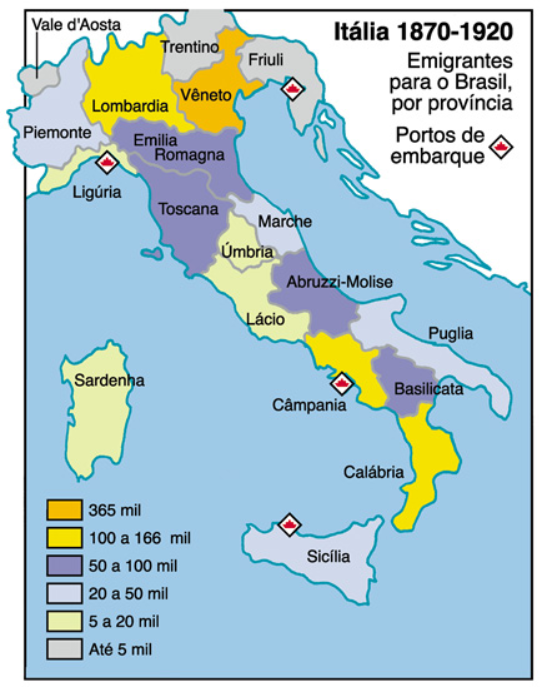
Italian regional immigration to Brazil, which has the most people of Italian origin outside Italy. Unlike other countries with Italian immigrants, Brazil prioritized Northern Italy which it considered more developed.

Immigration to Brazil is the movement to Brazil of foreign peoples to reside permanently. It should not be confused with the forcible bringing of people from Africa as slaves. Latin Europe accounted for four-fifths of the arrivals (1.8 million Portuguese, 1.7 million Italians, and 760,000 Spaniards). This engendered a strikingly multicultural society. Yet over a few generations, Brazil absorbed these new populations in a manner that resembles the experience of the rest of the New World.

== History ==
Throughout its history, Brazil has always been a recipient of settlers, but this began to gain importance in the late 19th century and throughout the 20th century when the country received massive immigration from Europe, the Middle East, and Japan, which left lasting marks on demography, culture, language and the economy of Brazil.

In general, it is considered that people who entered Brazil up to 1822, the year of independence, were wholly colonizers. Since then, some of those who entered the independent nation were immigrants, mainly Portuguese, Italians and Spaniards, but also Germans, Japanese, Poles, Lebanese, Syrians, Lithuanians, Ukrainians, Jews, Russians and many others.

Before 1871, the number of immigrants rarely exceeded two or three thousand people a year. Immigration increased pressure from the first end of the international slave trade to Brazil, after the expansion of the economy, especially in the period of large coffee plantations in the state of São Paulo.

Immigration has been a very important demographic factor in the composition, structure and history of human population in Brazil, with all its attending factors and consequences in culture, economy, education, racial issues. Brazil has received one of the largest numbers of immigrants in the Western Hemisphere, along with the United States, Argentina and Canada.

Counting from 1872 (year of the first census) by the year 2000, Brazil received about 6 million immigrants.

== Timeline ==
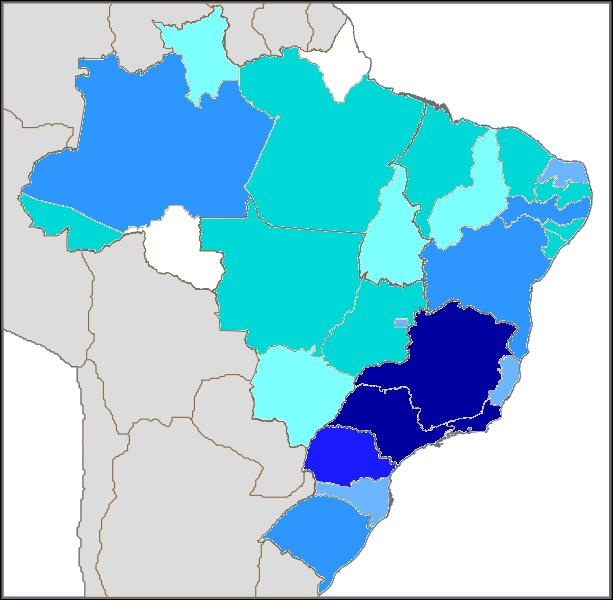
Total of foreign people authorized to work in Brazil by state in 2009. Rank by people. 1st 2nd 3rd 4th 5th

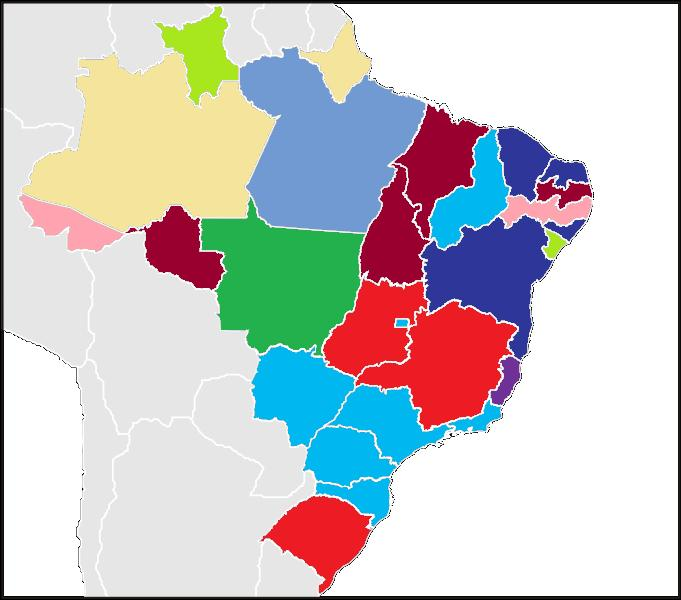
People authorized to work in Brazil by origin in 2009. Organized by largest ancestry. U.S. citizen Italian Portuguese Chinese Spanish Cuban German English French Japanese

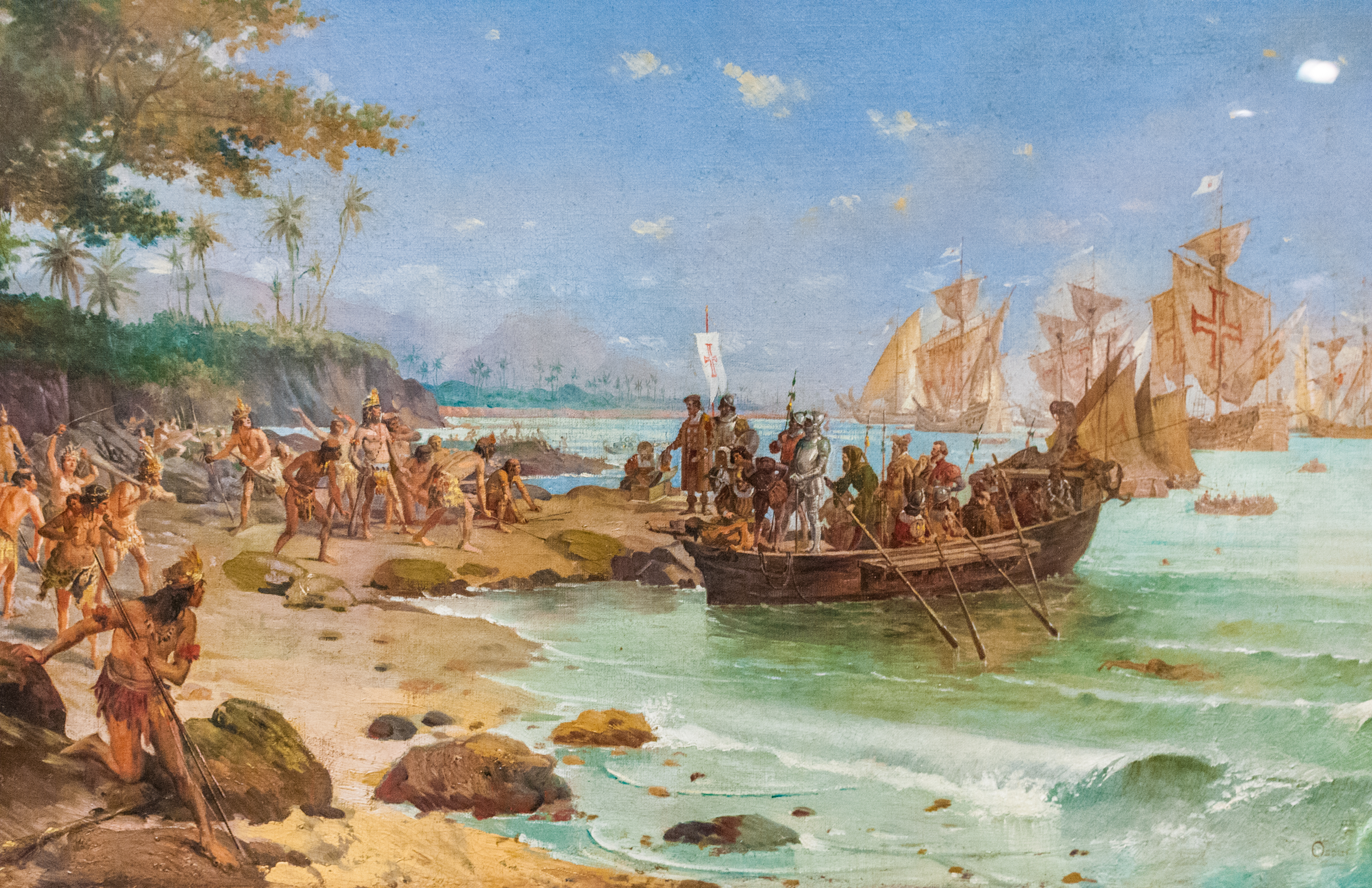
Arrival of the Portuguese to Northeast Brazil in 1500.

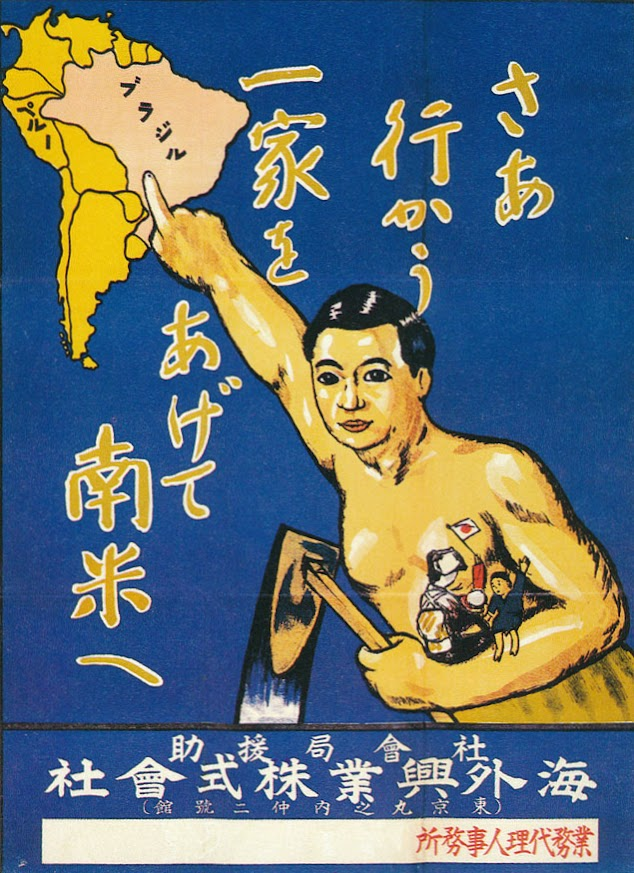
A poster used in Japan to attract immigrants to Brazil. It says "Let's go to South America (Brazil) with the family."

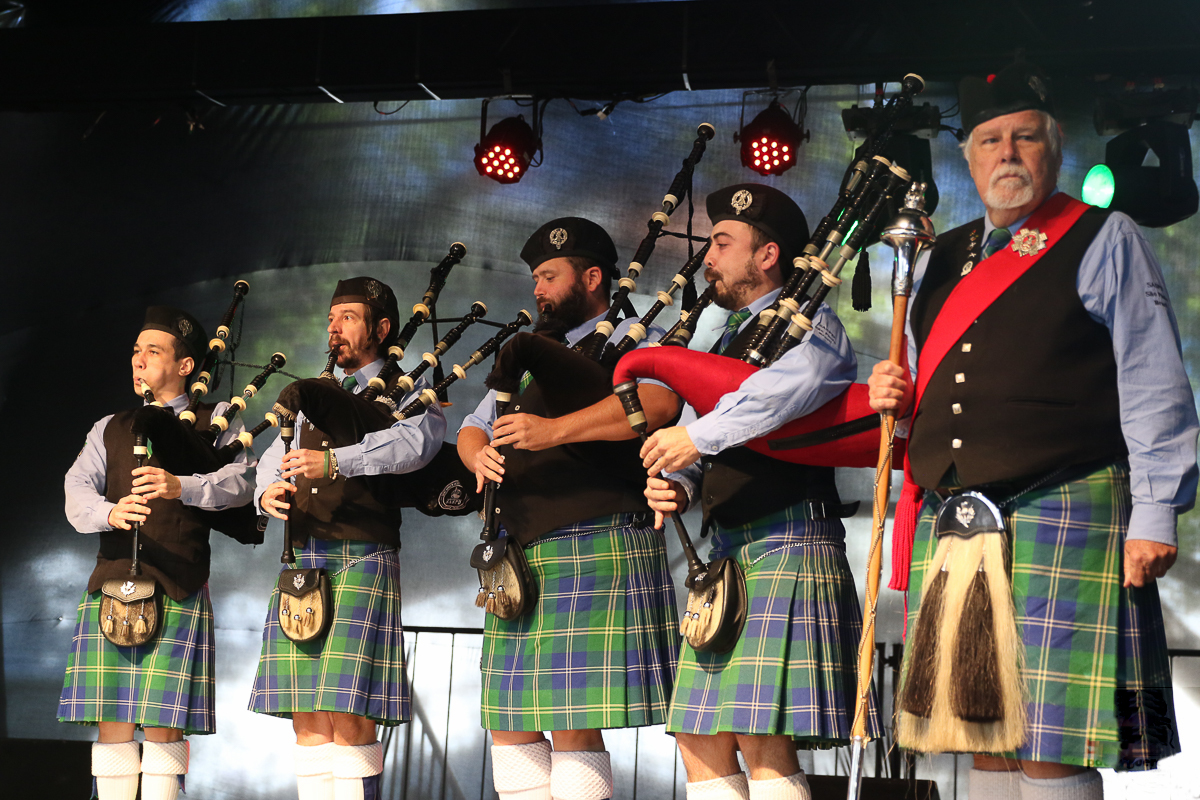
Scottish immigrants in Brazil.

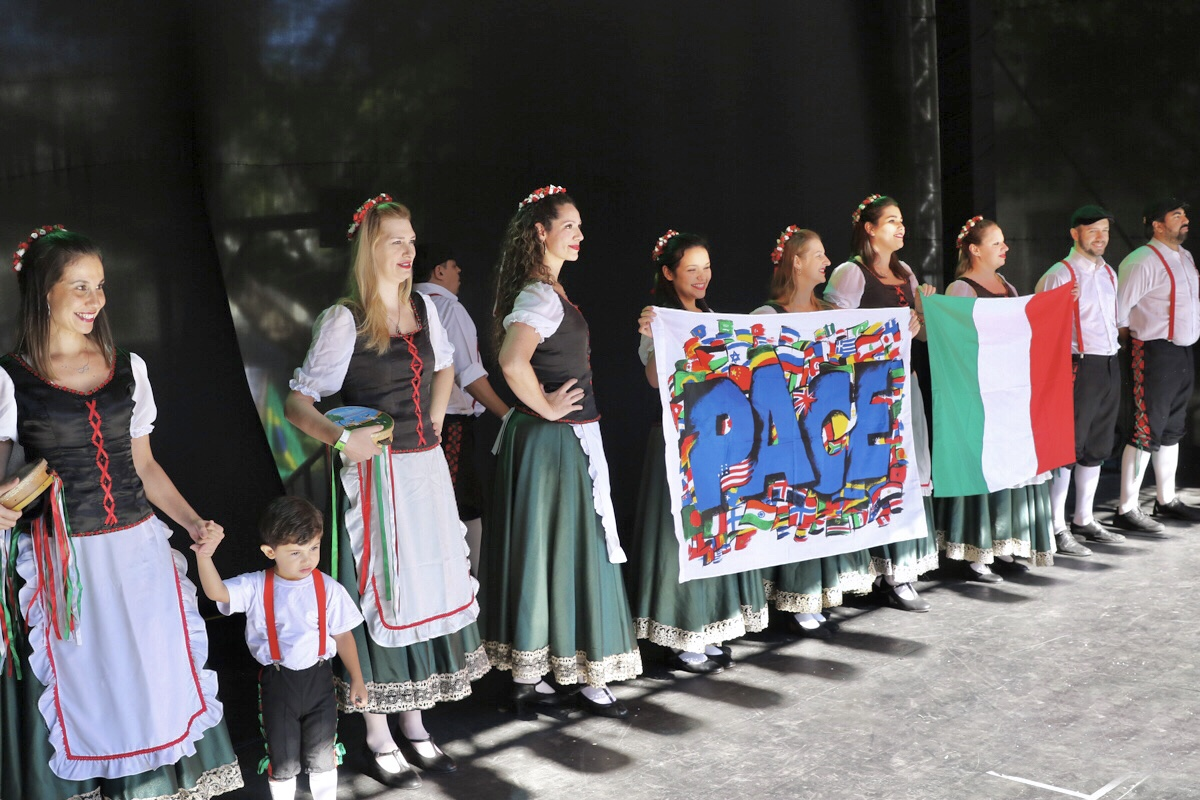
Italian immigrants in Brazil.

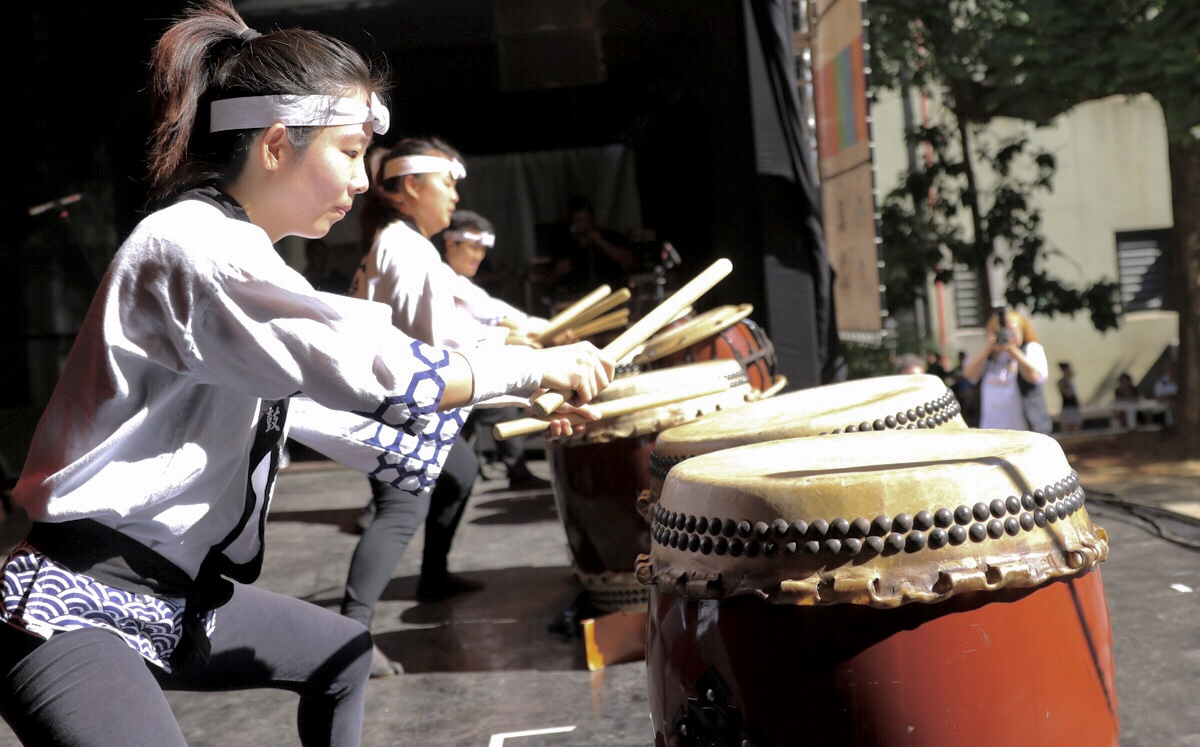
Japanese immigrants in Brazil.

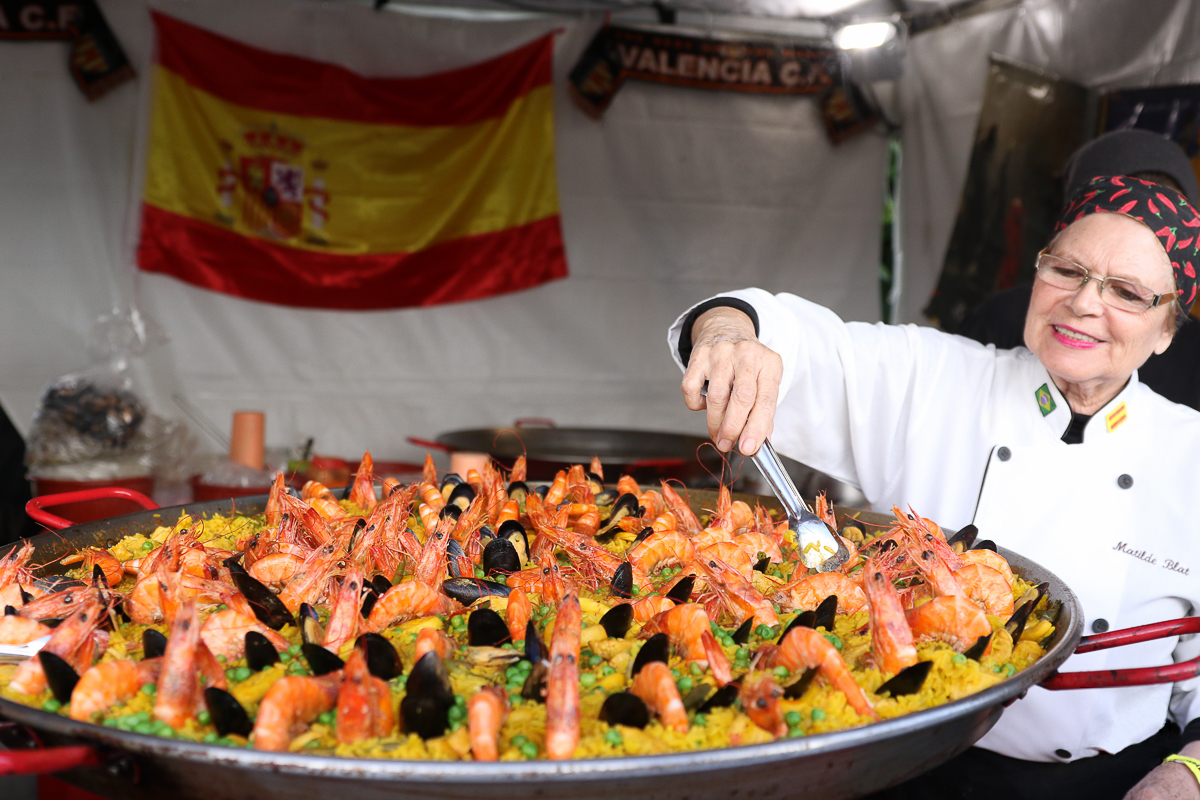
Spaniard in Brazil.

People authorized to work in Brazil by North American countries in 2009. Organized by number of people. 4,040 684 368

People authorized to work in Brazil by European countries in 2009. Organized by number of people. 2,528–648 523-184 177-050

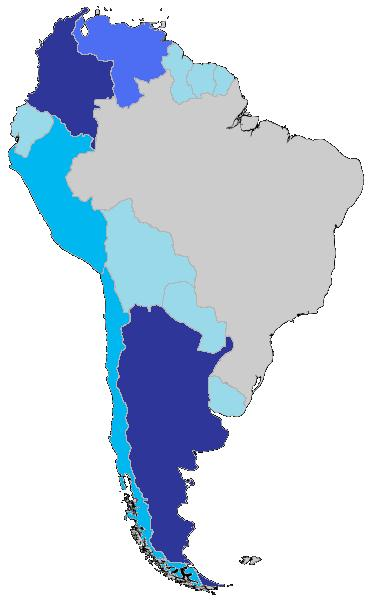
People authorized to work in Brazil by South American countries in 2009. Organized by number of people. 555-399 398-237 236-102 101-002

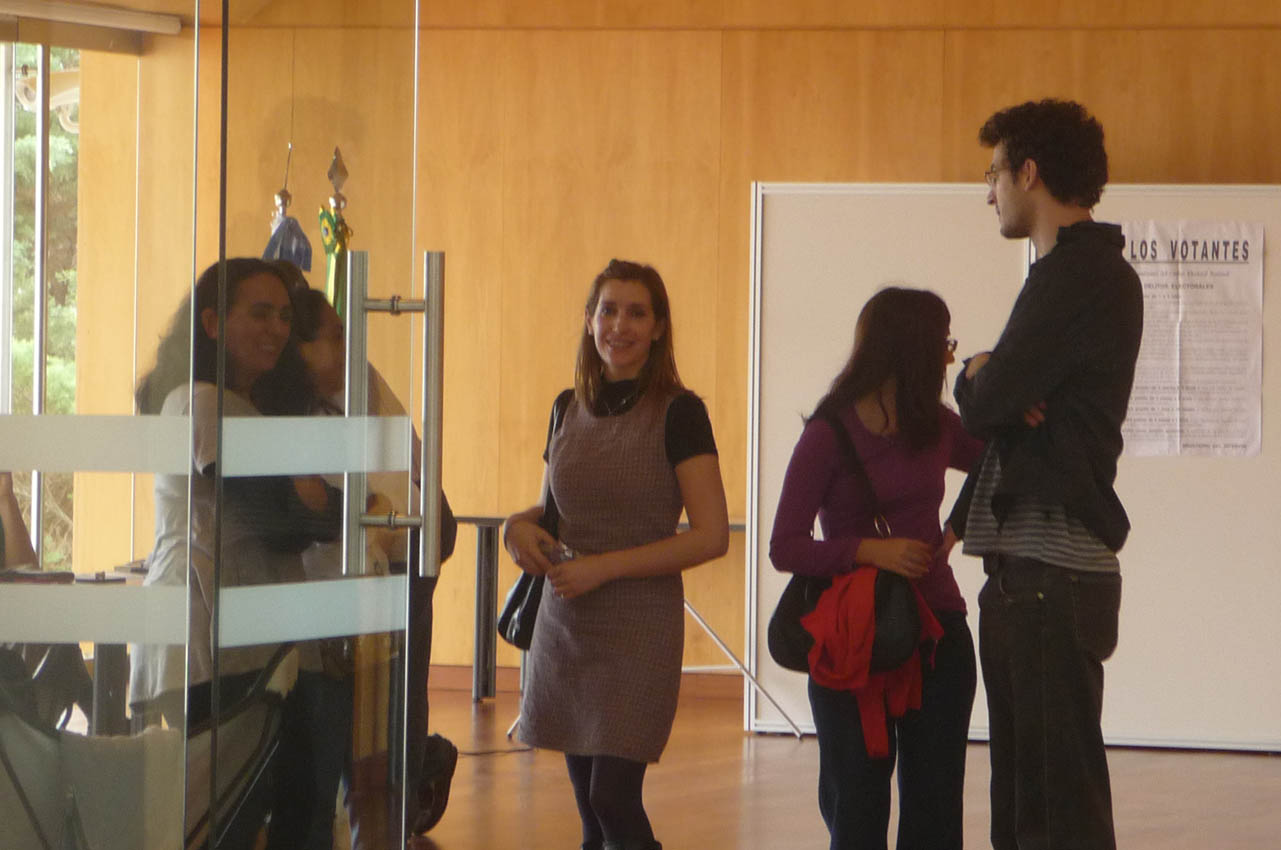
Argentines voting in Brasília.

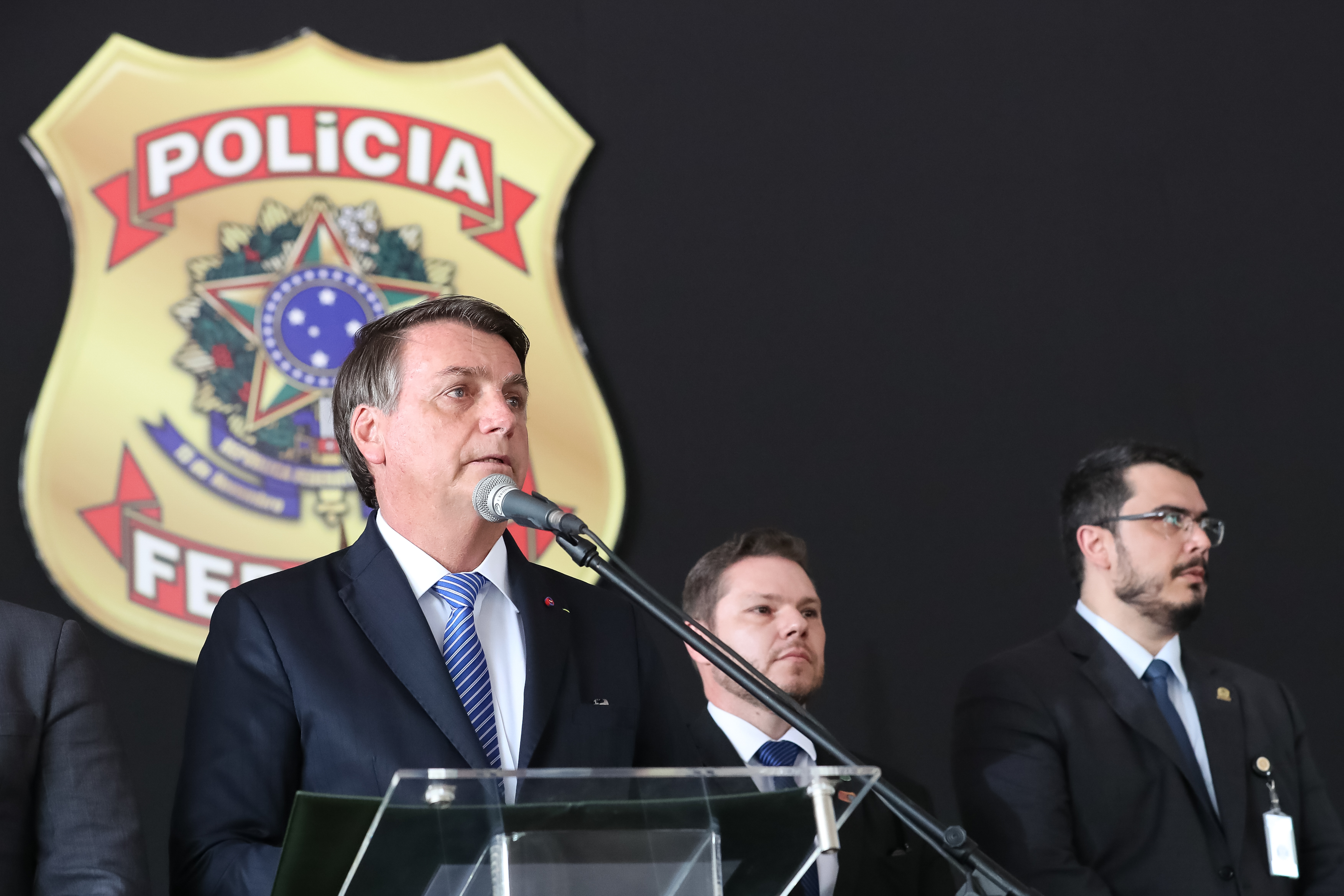
President Jair Bolsonaro ended tourist visa requirements for U.S. citizens, Canadians, Australians and Japanese.

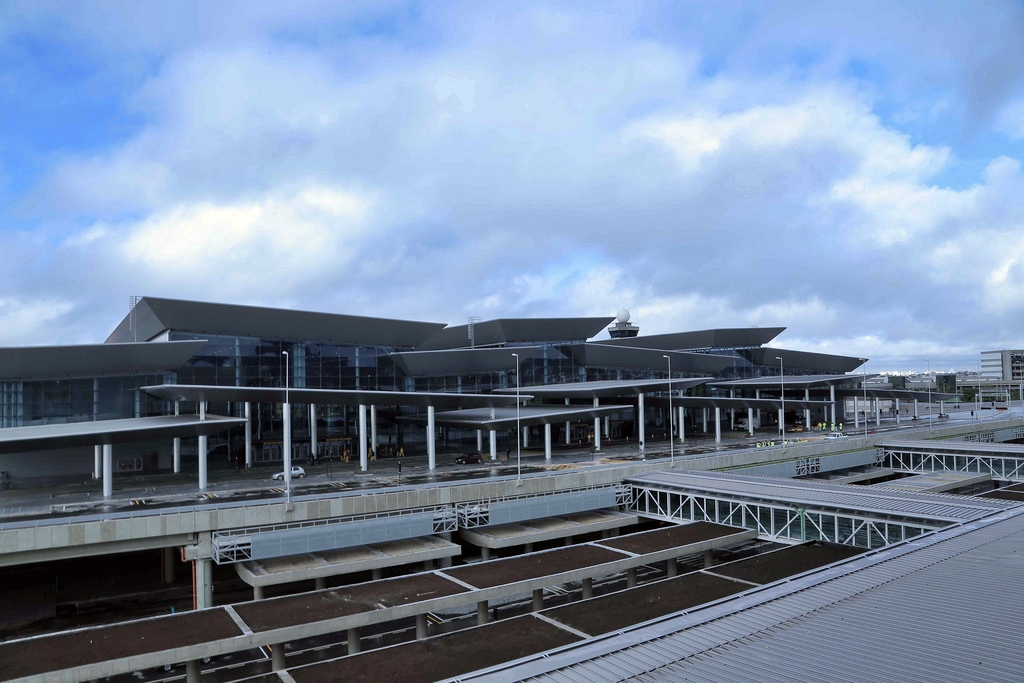
Most foreigners enter in Brazil through the intercontinental airport in São Paulo.

Maria Stella Ferreira Levy suggests the following periodization of the process of immigration to Brazil:

1. 1820–1876: small number of immigrants (about 6,000 per year), predominance of Portuguese (45.73%), with significant numbers of Germans (12.97%);
2. 1877–1903: large number of immigrants (about 71,000 per year), predominance of Italians (58.49%);
3. 1904–1930: large number of immigrants (about 79,000 per year), predominance of the Portuguese (36.97%);
4. 1931–1963: declining number of immigrants (about 33,500 per year), predominance of the Portuguese (38.45%).

=== The Brazilian population before immigration ===
When Brazil was settled as a new land in the New World by the Portuguese in 1500, its native population was composed of about 2.4 million Amerindians.

During the three decades afterwards, the country remained sparsely inhabited by Europeans. Among those few, mainly Portuguese, most were renegades, criminals banished from Portugal, shipwreck survivors, or mutinous sailors. They integrated into the local tribes, using their superior technology to attain privileged positions among them.

After 1530, the Portuguese started to settle in Brazil in significant numbers. However, Portugal had a small population to develop the exploitation of Brazil. By 1550, the colonists started to bring African slaves. From 1500, when the Portuguese reached Brazil, until its independence in 1822, from 500,000 to 700,000 Portuguese settled in Brazil, 600,000 of whom arrived in the 18th century alone.

The Portuguese settled in the whole territory, initially remaining near the coast, except in the region of São Paulo, from where the bandeirantes would spread into the hinterland. In the 18th century, large waves of Portuguese settled the country, in the wake of the discovery of gold in the region of Minas Gerais, but the number of Portuguese who settled in Brazil in its colonial era was far lower than of African slaves: from 1550 to 1850, some 4 million slaves were brought to Brazil.

This should not be taken as meaning that the population of Brazil before independence was mainly Black: the average survival of an African slave in Brazil was merely seven years after arrival, implying extremely high mortality rates. Although children born to slave women inherited the slave condition, the Portuguese always relied on slaves purchased from slave traders to replace and increase the work force; the natural growth of the slave population was always very small.

In the early 19th century, Brazil was mainly composed of people of three different origins: the indigenous inhabitants, the Portuguese and their descendants, the Africans and descendants, and, naturally, people of varying degrees of "racial" mixture. In 1872, after the arrival of about 350,000 mostly European immigrants and about 1,150,000 Africans forcibly brought to Brazil as slaves, the first Brazilian Census counted 9,930,478 people in Brazil, of which 3,787,289 (38.14%) were Whites, 3,380,172 (34.04%) were "pardos", 1,954,452 (19.68%) were Blacks, and 386,955 (3.90%) were "caboclos".

=== First period: 1820–1871 ===
Immigration properly started with the opening of the Brazilian ports, in 1808. The government began to stimulate the arrival of Europeans to occupy plots of land and become small farmers. In 1812, settlers from the Azores were brought to Espírito Santo and in 1819, Swiss to Nova Friburgo, Rio de Janeiro. After independence from Portugal, the Brazilian Empire focused on the occupation of the provinces of Southern Brazil. It was mainly because Southern Brazil had a small population, vulnerable to attacks by Argentina and the Kaingang Indians.

From 1824, immigrants from Central Europe started to populate what is nowadays the region of São Leopoldo, in the province of Rio Grande do Sul. According to Leo Waibel, these German immigrants were mainly "oppressed peasants and former soldiers of the army of Napoleon". In 1830 a bill was passed forbidding the Imperial government from spending money with the settlement of immigrants, which stalled immigration until 1834, when the provincial governments were charged with promoting immigration.

Following the American Civil War, some 20,000 Confederates from the American South immigrated to the Empire of Brazil. Many of them settled in São Paulo, particularly in the vicinity of the present day city of Americana. The immigrants were the first to bring Baptism, as well as Methodism to Brazil. These American immigrants and their descendants brought numerous culinary products over, such as chess pie. Today, there are some 260,000 descendants of the Confederates living in Brazil.

In 1859, Prussia prohibited emigration to Brazil. This was mainly because of complaints that Germans were being exploited in the coffee plantations of São Paulo. Still, between 1820 and 1876, 350,117 immigrants entered Brazil. Of these, 45.72% were Portuguese, 35.74% of "other nationalities", 12.97% Germans, while Italians and Spanish together did not reach 6%. The total number of immigrants per year averaged 6,000. Many immigrants, particularly the Germans, were brought to settle in rural communities as small landowners. They received land, seed, livestock and other items to develop.

=== Second Period: 1872–1903 ===
In the last quarter of the 19th century, the entry of immigrants in Brazil grew strongly. On one hand, Europe underwent a serious demographic crisis, which resulted in increased emigration; on the other hand, the final crisis of Brazilian slavery prompted Brazilian authorities to find solutions for the problem of work force. Consequently, while immigration until 1871 was focused on establishing communities of landowners, during this period, while this older process continued, immigrants were more and more attracted to the coffee plantations of São Paulo, where they became employees or were allowed to cultivate small tracts of land in exchange for their work in the coffee crop.

This also coincided with the decreasing availability of better land in southern Brazil—while the German immigrants arriving in the previous period occupied the valleys of the rivers, the Italians arriving in the last quarter of the century settled the mountainous regions of the state.

During this period, immigration was much more intense: large numbers of Europeans, especially Italians, started to be brought to the country to work in the harvest of coffee. From 1877 to 1903, almost two million immigrants arrived, at a rate of 71,000 per year. Brazil's receiving structure, legislation and settlement policies for immigrants were much less organized than in Canada and the United States at the time. Nevertheless, an Immigrant's Hostel (Hospedaria dos Imigrantes) was built in 1886 in São Paulo, and quick admittance and recording routines for the throngs of immigrants arriving by ship at the seaports of Vitória, Rio de Janeiro, Santos, Paranaguá, Florianópolis and Porto Alegre were established. The São Paulo site alone processed more than 2.5 million immigrants in its almost 100 years of continuous operation. People of more than 70 different nationalities were recorded.

In 1850, Brazil declared the end of the slave trade. This had different impacts on the different regions of Brazil. At the time, the region of São Paulo was undergoing a process of economic boom, linked to the expansion of the cultivation of coffee, and consequently needed increased amounts of labour. Other regions, notedly the Northeast, on the contrary, faced economic retraction, and were, consequently, able to dispense workforce. This entailed the replacement of the international slave trade by an internal or interprovincial slave trade, in which Northeastern slaves were sold in large numbers to the Southeast.

This temporarily solved the workforce problem in São Paulo and other coffee plantation areas. However, by 1870 the paulista elite came to realise that the Northeastern slaveholders were in fact being able to obtain financial compensation for their slaves, or, in practice, an abolition with compensation. Fears of a situation comparable to the United States, with the division of the country into free provinces and slave provinces arose. Consequently, paulista politicians began to seek measures against the interprovincial traffic, at a time when, anyway, the price of Northeastern slaves was getting higher and higher, due to their increasing scarcity.

By the beginning of the 1870s, the alternative of the interprovincial trade was exhausted, while the demand for workforce in the coffee plantations continued to expand. Thus the paulista oligarchy sought to attract new workers from abroad, by passing provincial legislation and pressing the Imperial government to organise immigration.

=== Third period: 1904–1930 ===
From 1904 to 1930, 2,142,781 immigrants came to Brazil—making an annual average of 79,000 people. In consequence of the Prinetti Decree of 1902, that forbade subsidised emigration to Brazil, Italian immigration had, at this stage, a drastic reduction: their average annual entries from 1887 to 1903 was 58,000. In this period they were only 19,000 annually. The Portuguese constituted 38% of entries, followed by Spaniards with 22%. From 1914 to 1918, due to World War I, the entry of immigrants of all nationalities decreased. After the War, the immigration of people of "other nationalities" redressed faster than that of Portuguese, Spaniards, and Italians. Part of this category was composed of immigrants from Poland, Russia, Lithuania, Moldova and Romania, who immigrated probably by political issues, and part by Syrian and Lebanese peoples. Both subgroups included a number of Jewish immigrants, who arrived in the 1920s.

From 1931 to 1963, 1,106,404 immigrants entered Brazil. The participation of the Japanese increased. From 1932 to 1935 immigrants from Japan constituted 30% of total admissions. Prior to this yearly Japanese immigrants were numerically limited to no more than 5% of the current Japanese population.

Immigrants continued working in coffee plantations. By 1934, over 40% of the coffee production in São Paulo was produced by the 14.5 percent foreign population of the state, showing their entrepreneurial spirit and ambition. In fact, 19th century immigrants usually exhibited a formal and informal education and training that was better than that of native Brazilians. The country benefitted from their arrival not only because of their workforce, but also because of the skills and knowledge they shared. Spillover effects led to increased levels of human capital, with the effect being most prominent in regions with the highest numbers of immigrants.

=== Fourth Period: 1931–1964 ===
With the radicalization of the political situation in Europe, the end of the demographic crisis, the decadence of coffee culture, the Revolution of 1930 and the consequent rise of a nationalist government, immigration to Brazil was significantly reduced. The focus shifted to culturally assimilating immigrants and "whitening" the population. From 1931 to 1963, 1,106,404 immigrants entered Brazil. The annual arrival of immigrants fell to 33,500. The Portuguese remained the most significant group, with 39.35%, The participation of the Japanese continued to increase, becoming the second most important group, with 12.79%. Particularly from 1932 to 1935 immigrants from Japan constituted 30% of total admissions.

Immigration also became a more urban phenomenon; most immigrants came for the cities, and even the descendants of the immigrants of the previous periods were moving intensely from the countryside. In the 1950s, Brazil started a program of immigration to provide workers for Brazilian industries. In São Paulo, for example, between 1957 and 1961, more than 30% of the Spanish, over 50% of the Italian and 70% of the Greek immigrants were brought to work in factories.

=== Current trends ===
During the 1970s Brazil received about 32,000 Lebanese immigrants escaping the civil war, as well as smaller numbers of Palestinians and Syrians. Between 1974 and 1980 Brazil also received almost 500 Portuguese settler families fleeing Angola or Mozambique as well as some 1,000 exiles from Portugal proper, many of them serving officers of the Portuguese Military or Police, fleeing post-Carnation Revolution Portugal because of their association with the former regime.

During the 1990s Brazil received small numbers of immigrants from the former republics of Yugoslavia, from Afghanistan and Angola. Recent immigration is mainly constituted by Chinese and Koreans and, in a smaller degree, by Argentines and other Latin American immigrants.

Because of political issues, people from Bolivia immigrate to Brazil. The majority of the Bolivians come from cities such as La Paz, Sucre, Santa Cruz de la Sierra, and Cochabamba. Usually they enter Brazil through Cuiabá, in Mato Grosso, or San Mathias, in Bolivia, which borders Caceres, Mato Grosso and Corumbá, in Mato Grosso do Sul.

Between 1,200 and 1,500 Bolivian immigrants come to Brazil every month looking for a job. Most of them work in the illegal textile industry in the Greater São Paulo. There are an estimated 200,000 Bolivians living in the Greater São Paulo, the majority of which are undocumented immigrants.

In July 2019, President Jair Bolsonaro regulated the right of residence of Cuban doctors who participated in the Mais Médicos Program, or More Doctors. To be allowed to stay in Brazil for two years, the candidate must submit an application to the Federal Police of Brazil. Thereafter, immigrants can apply to live in the country indefinitely with permanent residence, submitting another application within ninety days prior to the end of the two-year residence period. Physicians requesting the right of residence must present several documents, such as identity or passport, as well as police records from the Brazilian states and countries where they resided, and finally, proof of participation in the Mais Médicos initiative, immigration documents and photos.

In 2020, Brazil approved 24,880 processes for requesting recognition of refugee status. The largest refugee ancestries were Venezuelan (24,030), Syrian (479), Cuban (114), Iraqi (35), and Afghan (28).

Due to the Venezuelan refugee crisis, in 2020, Venezuelans are the largest immigrant group living in Brazil. Argentines are the fifth largest immigrant group in Brazil due to factors such as proximity to Brazil, immigration agreements, linguistic similarity between Portuguese and Spanish, and economic growth in Brazil, facilitate this movement to the neighboring country.

=== Country of birth ===
Number of registered immigrants in Brazil. The 20 countries with the most registered immigrants are listed below.

Place	Country	2000-2024
1	Venezuela	526,148
2	Haiti	181,404
3	Bolivia	171,721
4	Colombia	98,253
5	Argentina	95,294
6	United States	91,977
7	China	71,479
8	Paraguay	61,042
9	Peru	56,745
10	Uruguay	56,558
11	Cuba	50,355
12	Portugal	49,920
13	France	48,545
14	Germany	43,352
15	Italy	42,575
16	Spain	34,499
17	Philippines	31,870
18	Japan	31,268
19	Angola	28,781
20	United Kingdom	26,093
TOTAL		2,213,884

=== Asylum seekers in Brazil in 2025 ===
In 2025, Brazil received 50,355 asylum requests, with a significant reduction compared to the previous year.

Place	Country	Total
1	Cuba	41,919
2	Venezuela	21,233
3	Colombia	1,432
4	Angola	1,253
5	Morocco	888
6	Ghana	792
7	Republic of the Congo	707
8	Bangladesh	665
9	Dominican Republic	525
10	Tunisia	475
11	China	443
12	Nigeria	327
13	Lebanon	277
14	Peru	269
15	Haiti	262
16	Guinea	233
17	Mauritania	228
18	Togo	194
19	Argentina	192
20	Russia	189
~	Other countries	3,096

== Visa policy ==
Visa policy of Brazil Brazil May enter with an identity card Visa not required Electronic visa for all visitor categories Electronic visa for business only Visa required

Nationals of many countries may visit Brazil without a visa. Nationals of certain countries may apply for visitor visas electronically.

For longer stays, Brazil offers many categories of visas, such as for work, study, investment and family reunification. Some categories allow applying for permanent residency.

Nationals of nine countries in South America may enter Brazil using only their identity document, that is, a passport is not necessary for entry, although some may use a passport if desired. It is a measure of reciprocity for nationals of all these countries, to facilitate work, study and tourism across the border.

Nationals of all countries in South America may establish residency in Brazil, under the Mercosur residency agreement or unilateral ordinance:

- By requesting a Mercosur temporary residency visa, if the immigrant is abroad and a national of a party to the Mercosur residency agreement; or
- Without a visa, if already in Brazil, by applying to the Federal Police or Ministry of Justice, in accordance with the relevant articles of the agreement or unilateral ordinance.
- Due to separate agreements, nationals of Argentina and Uruguay may apply for permanent residency immediately, while nationals of other South American countries may apply for it after two years of temporary residency.

Nationals of member states of the Community of Portuguese Language Countries in certain occupations may apply for a visa to immigrate to Brazil. Nationals of these countries who are in Brazil, regardless of occupation or visa, may apply for temporary residency, and after two years, for permanent residency.

== Immigration law ==
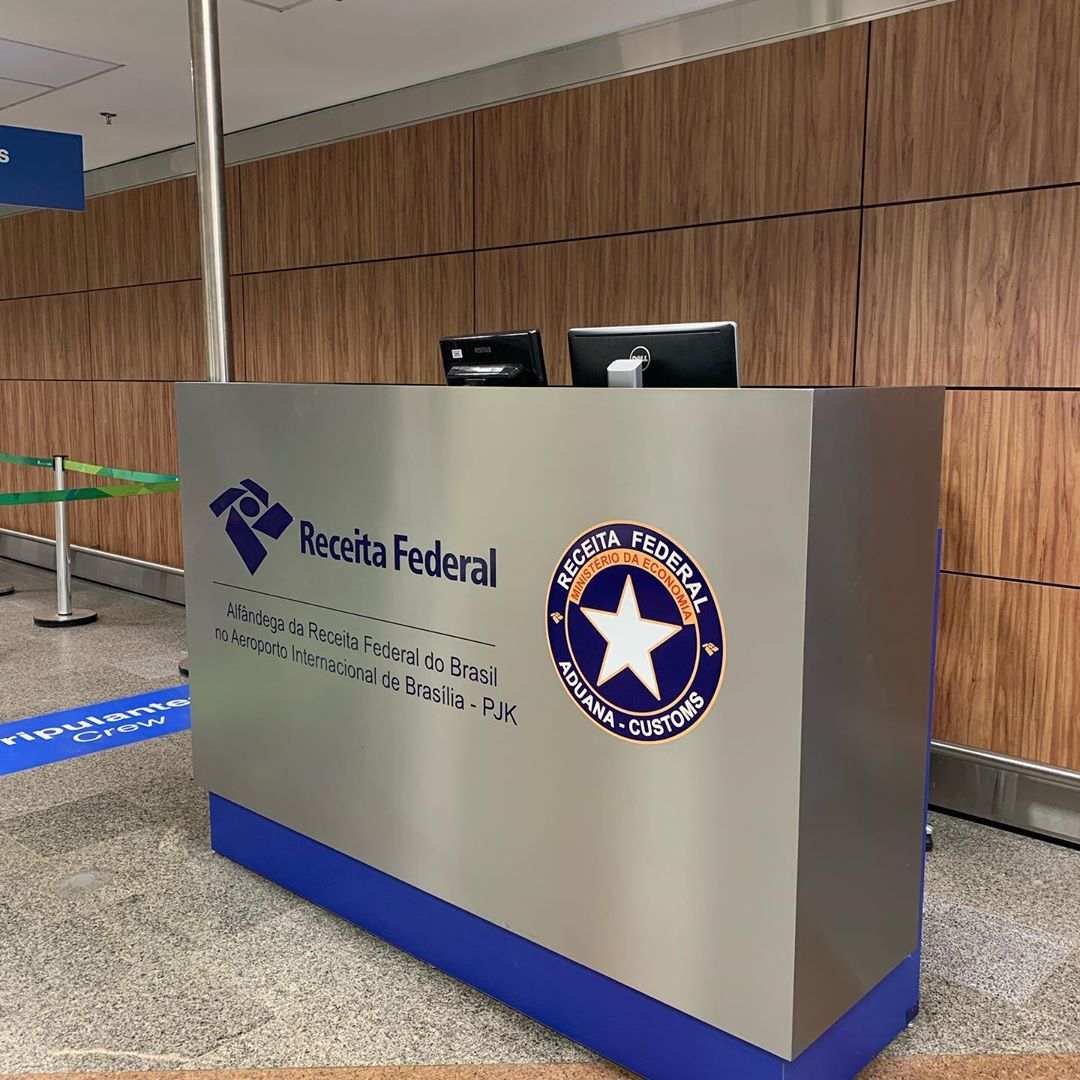
International Airport Customs in Brasília.

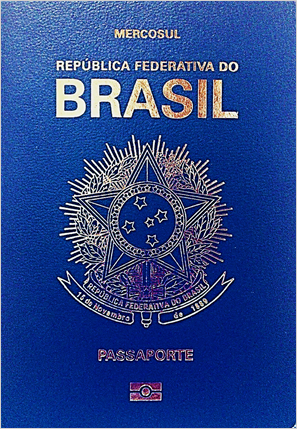
Brazilian passport.

LGBT immigration equality by country or territory Recognition of same-sex couples in national immigration laws Unknown/ambiguous

A foreigner with a permanent resident visa has nearly all of the same rights as a Brazilian citizen, such as access to health and education services in Brazil, in addition to being able to open a business, bank account, obtain a driver's license, among others. The permanent resident cannot vote or be elected to political office, and can only exercise these two rights after Brazilian naturalization.

=== Federal Constitution ===
Article 5. Everyone is equal before the law, with no distinction whatsoever, guaranteeing to Brazilians and foreigners residing in the country the inviolability of the rights to life, liberty, equality, security and property.

No Brazilian shall be extradited, except for a naturalized Brazilian for a common crime committed prior to naturalization, or proven involvement in unlawful traffic in narcotics and similar drugs, as provided by law. No foreigner shall be extradited for a political or ideological offense.

Article 12. Brazilians are:

I - by birth:

a) those born in the Federative Republic of Brazil, even though of foreign parents, provided that they are not in the service of their country;

b) those born abroad of a Brazilian father or mother, so long as either is in the service of the Federative Republic of Brazil;

c) those born abroad of a Brazilian father or mother, so long as they are registered at a proper Brazilian governmental office, or come to reside in the Federative Republic of Brazil and opt for Brazilian nationality at any time after reaching the age of majority;

II - by naturalization:

a) those who, as set forth by law, acquire Brazilian nationality, it being the only requirement for persons originating from Portuguese-speaking countries the residence for 1 (one) uninterrupted year and good moral repute;

b) foreigners of any nationality, resident in the Federative Republic of Brazil for over 15 (fifteen) uninterrupted years and without criminal conviction, provided that they apply for the Brazilian nationality.

Paragraph 1. The rights inherent to Brazilians shall be attributed to Portuguese citizens with permanent residence in Brazil, if there is reciprocity in favour of Brazilians, except in the cases stated in this Constitution.

Paragraph 2. The law may not establish any distinction between born and naturalized Brazilians, except in the cases stated in this Constitution.

Paragraph 3. The following positions are restricted to native born Brazilians:

I - President and Vice-President of the Republic;

II - President of the Chamber of Deputies;

III - President of the Federal Senate;

IV - Minister of the Supreme Federal Tribunal;

V - The diplomatic career;

VI - Officers of the Armed Forces;

VII - The Minister of Defense.

Paragraph 4. Loss of nationality shall be declared for a Brazilian:

I - Whose naturalization has been cancelled by judicial decision because of activity harmful to the national interest;

II - acquires another nationality, except in the cases:

a) of recognition of original nationality by foreign law;

b) of a foreign law imposing naturalization upon a Brazilian residing in a foreign country as a condition for remaining in its territory or for exercise of civil rights.

Article 22. The Union has exclusive power to legislate with respect to:

XIII - nationality, citizenship and naturalization;

XV - emigration, immigration, entry, extradition and expulsion of foreigners;

=== Statute of Foreigner ===
Article 112. Are conditions for the granting of naturalization:

I - civilian capacity, according to Brazilian law;

II - to be registered as permanent resident in Brazil;

III - continuous residence in the territory for a minimum period of 4 (four) years immediately preceding the application for naturalization;

IV - read and write the Portuguese language, considering the conditions of naturalizing;

V - exercise of occupation or possession of sufficient assets to maintain itself and the family;

VI - proper procedure;

VII - no complaint, indictment in Brazil or abroad for a felony that is threatened in minimum sentence of imprisonment, abstractly considered, more than 1 (one) year;

VIII - good health.

Article 113.The period of residence prescribed in Article 112, item III, may be reduced if the naturalizing fill any of the following conditions:

I - have a child or spouse of Brazil;

(Including same-sex spouse, see also: Same-sex immigration policy in Brazil)

II - be son of a Brazilian;

III - have provided or can provide relevant services to Brazil, in the opinion of the Minister of Justice of Brazil;

IV - commend themselves by their professional, scientific or artistic; or

V - to be owner in Brazil, real estate, whose value is equal to at least a thousand times the greatest value of reference, or be provided with industrial funds of equal value, or hold quota shares or amount of paid-in least identical in commercial or civil society, aimed principally and permanently, the operation of industrial or agricultural activities.

Sole Paragraph. The residence will be at least 1 (one) year, in cases of items I, II, and III; 2 (two) years in Item IV; and 3 (three) years in Item V.

== The result of immigration to Brazil ==
=== Immigration ===
Immigration to Brazil, by national origin, periods from 1830 to 1959 Source: Brazilian Institute for Geography and Statistics (IBGE)
	Period											
Origin	1830–1855	1856–1883	1884–1893	1894–1903	1904–1913	1914–1923	1924–1933	1945–1949	1950–1954	1955–1959	1960–1969	1970–1972
(Portugal) Portuguese	16,737	116,000	170,621	155,542	384,672	201,252	233,650	26,268	123,082	96,811	197,587 immigrants; many nationalities	15,558 immigrants; majority from Portugal
(Italy) Italians	—	100,000	510,533	537,784	196,521	86,320	70,177	15,312	59,785	31,263	197,587 immigrants; many nationalities	15,558 immigrants; majority from Portugal
(Spain) Spaniards	—	—	113,116	102,142	224,672	94,779	52,400	4,092	53,357	38,819	197,587 immigrants; many nationalities	15,558 immigrants; majority from Portugal
(Germany) Germans	2,008	30,000	22,778	6,698	33,859	29,339	61,723	5,188	12,204	4,633	197,587 immigrants; many nationalities	15,558 immigrants; majority from Portugal
(Japan) Japanese	—	—	—	—	11,868	20,398	110,191	12	5,447	28,819	197,587 immigrants; many nationalities	15,558 immigrants; majority from Portugal
(Lebanon) (Syria) Lebanese and Syrians	—	—	96	7,124	45,803	20,400	20,400	N/D	N/D	N/D	197,587 immigrants; many nationalities	15,558 immigrants; majority from Portugal
Others	—	—	66,524	42,820	109,222	51,493	164,586	29,552	84,851	47,599	197,587 immigrants; many nationalities	15,558 immigrants; majority from Portugal

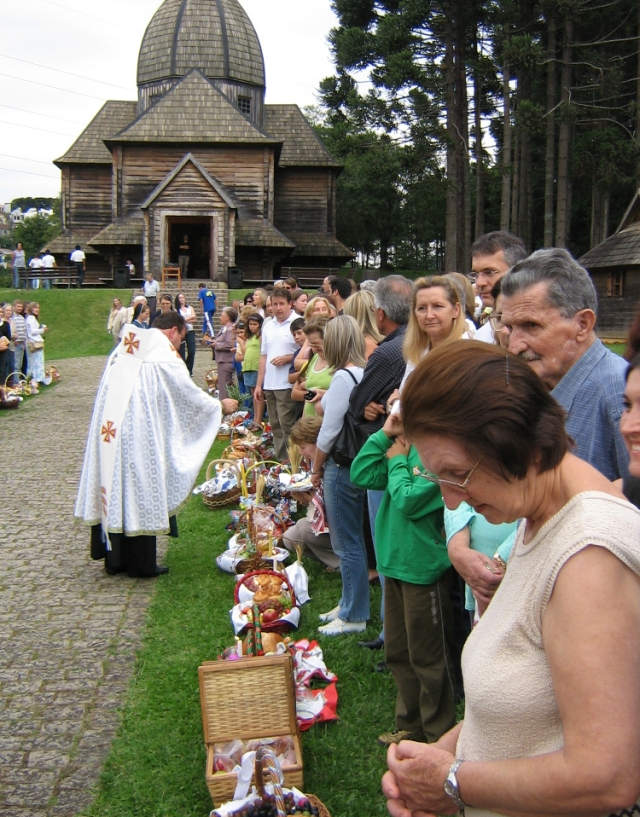
Ukrainian immigrants in Curitiba, Paraná celebrating the Ukrainian Easter.

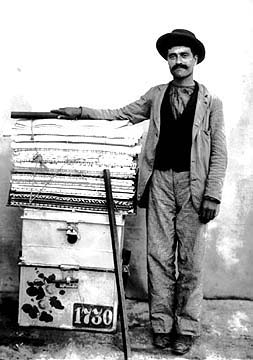
A Portuguese immigrant in Rio de Janeiro, 1895.

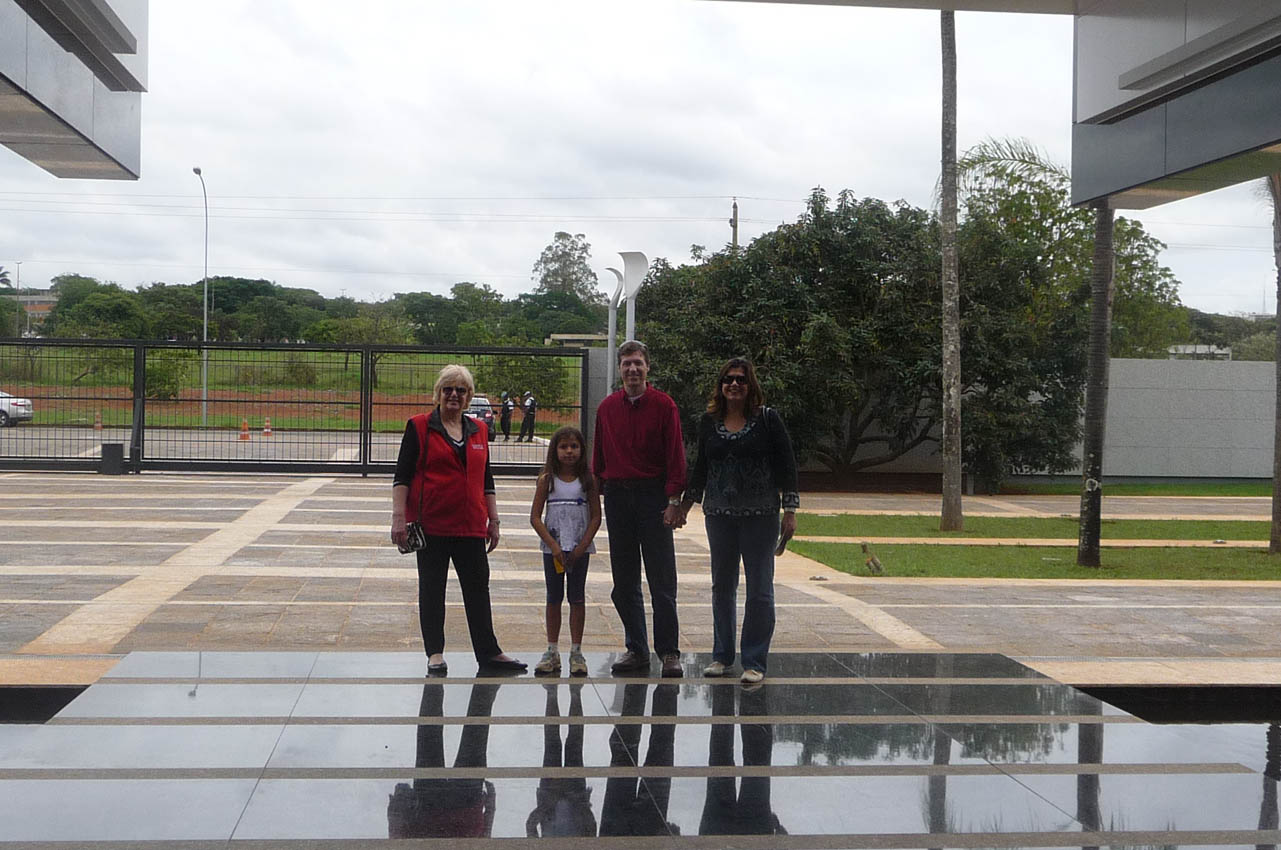
Argentines voting in Brasília.

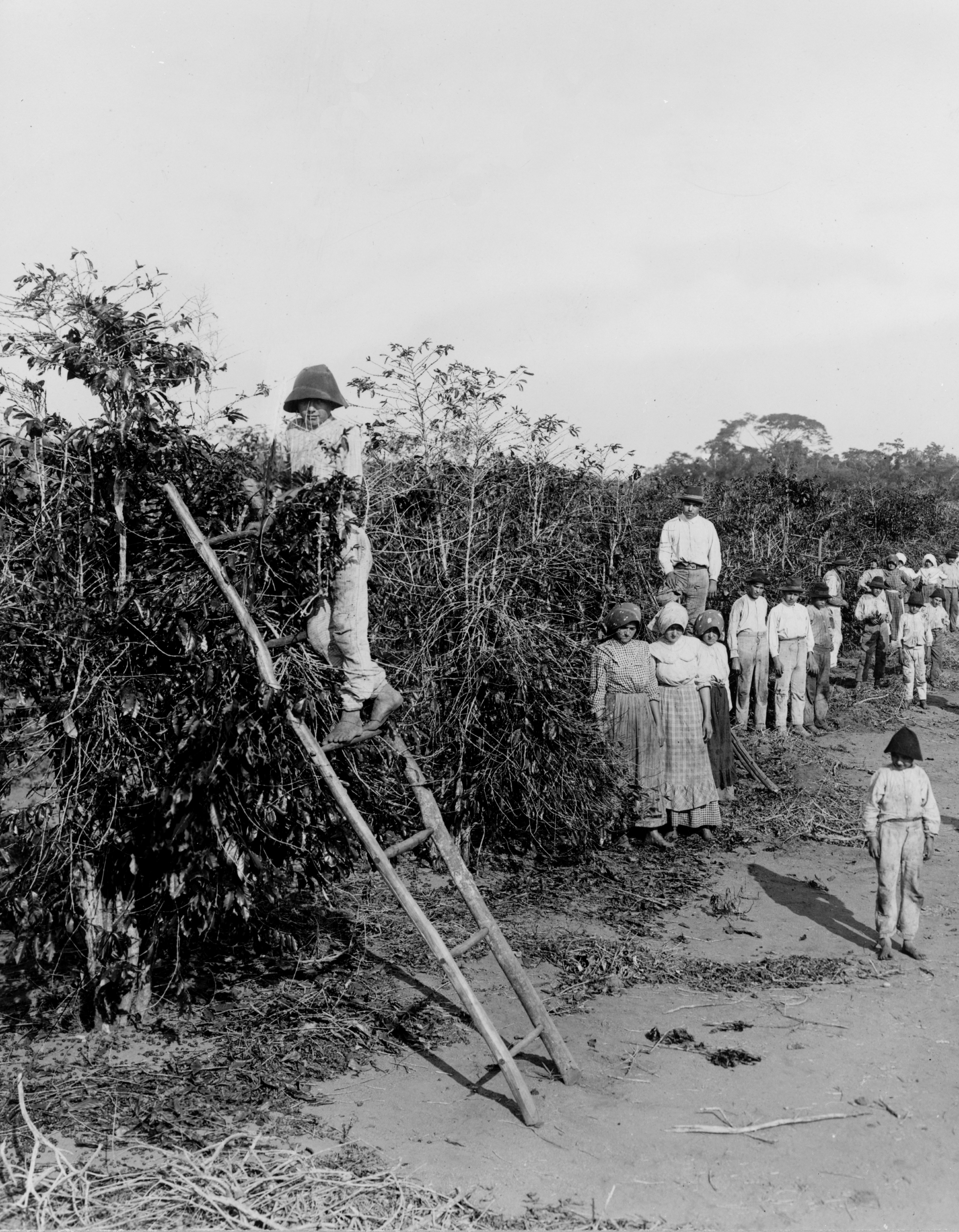
European immigrants and a Brazilian coffee plantation.

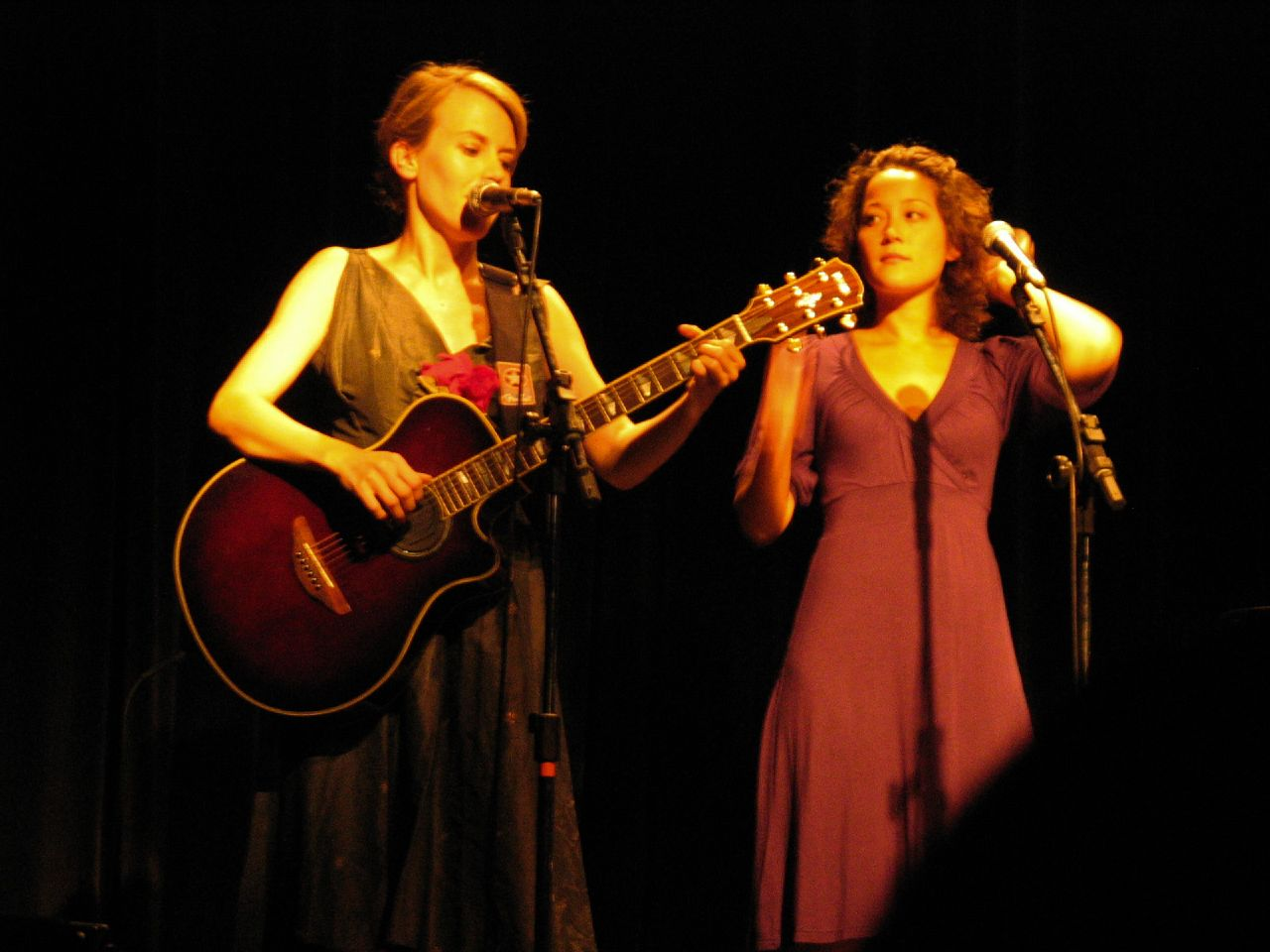
Swedish and Japanese descendants in São Paulo.

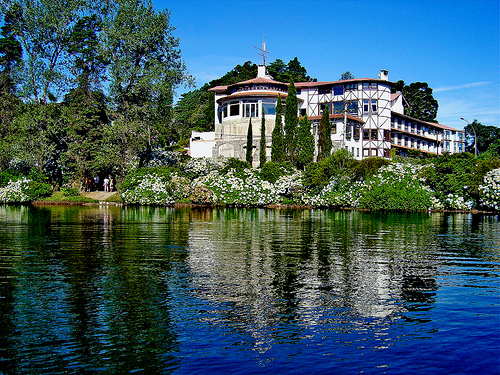
Gramado was colonized by Germans and Italians.

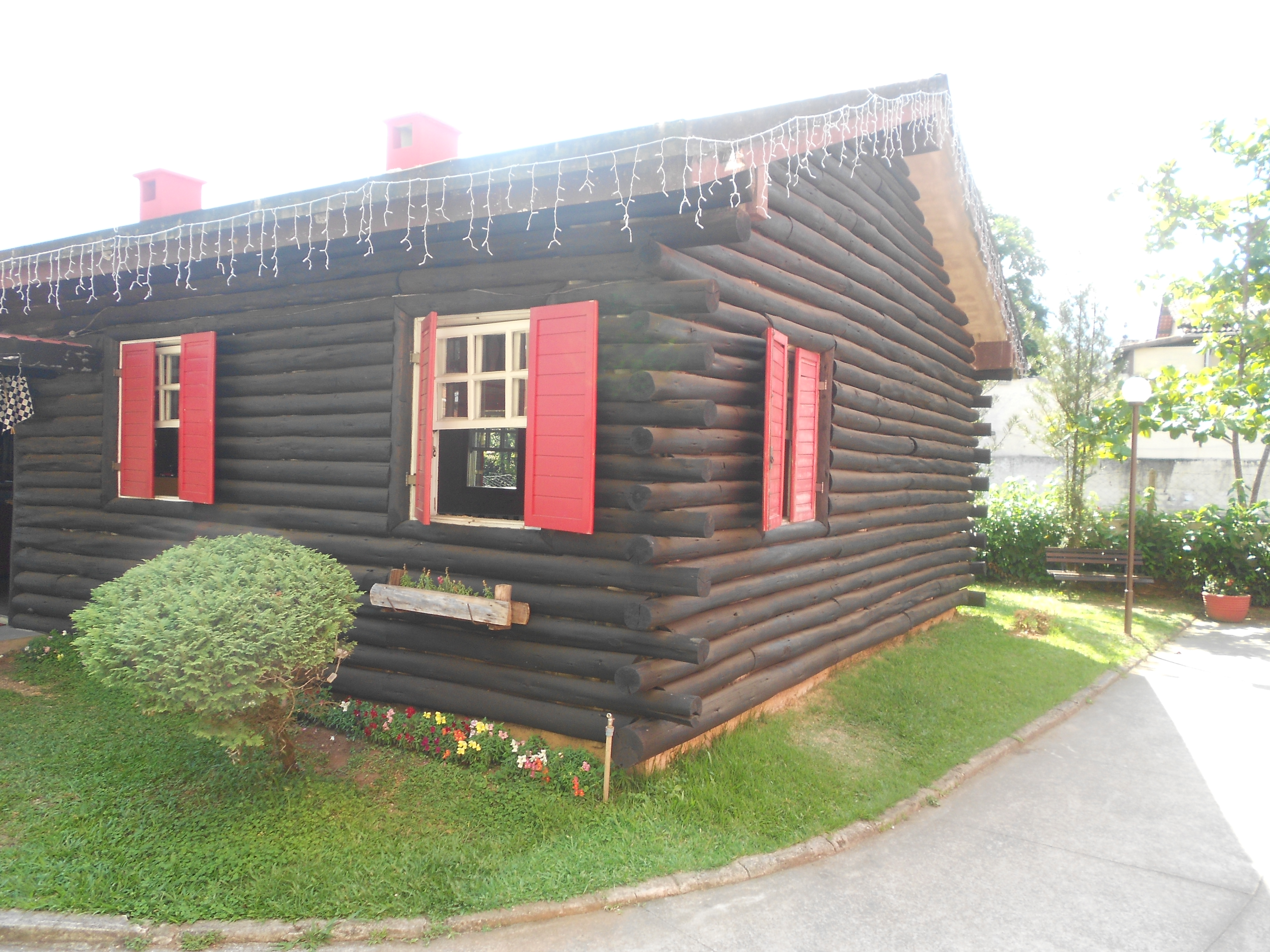
Finnish community in Itatiaia.

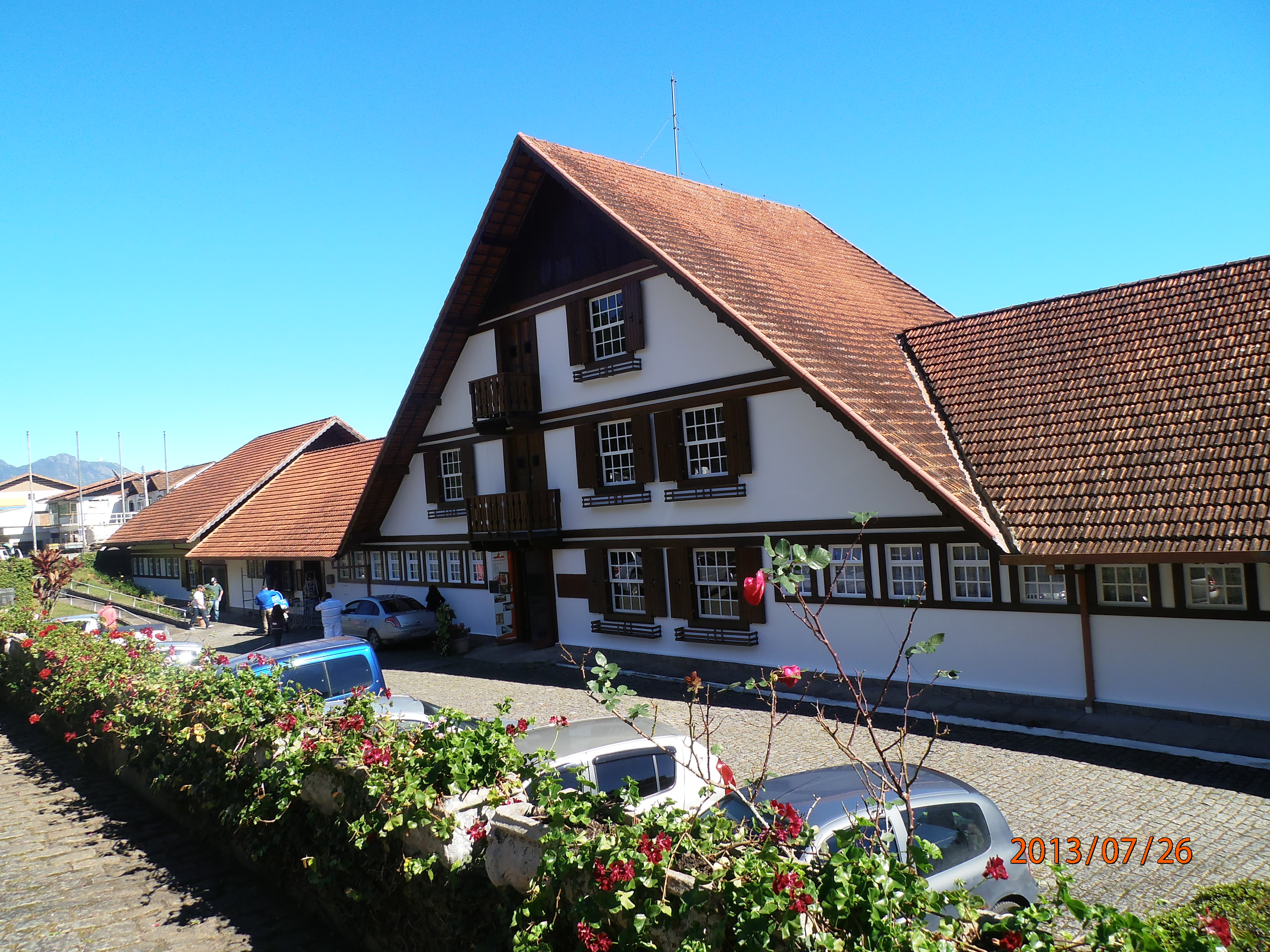
Nova Friburgo with a Swiss cheese factory.

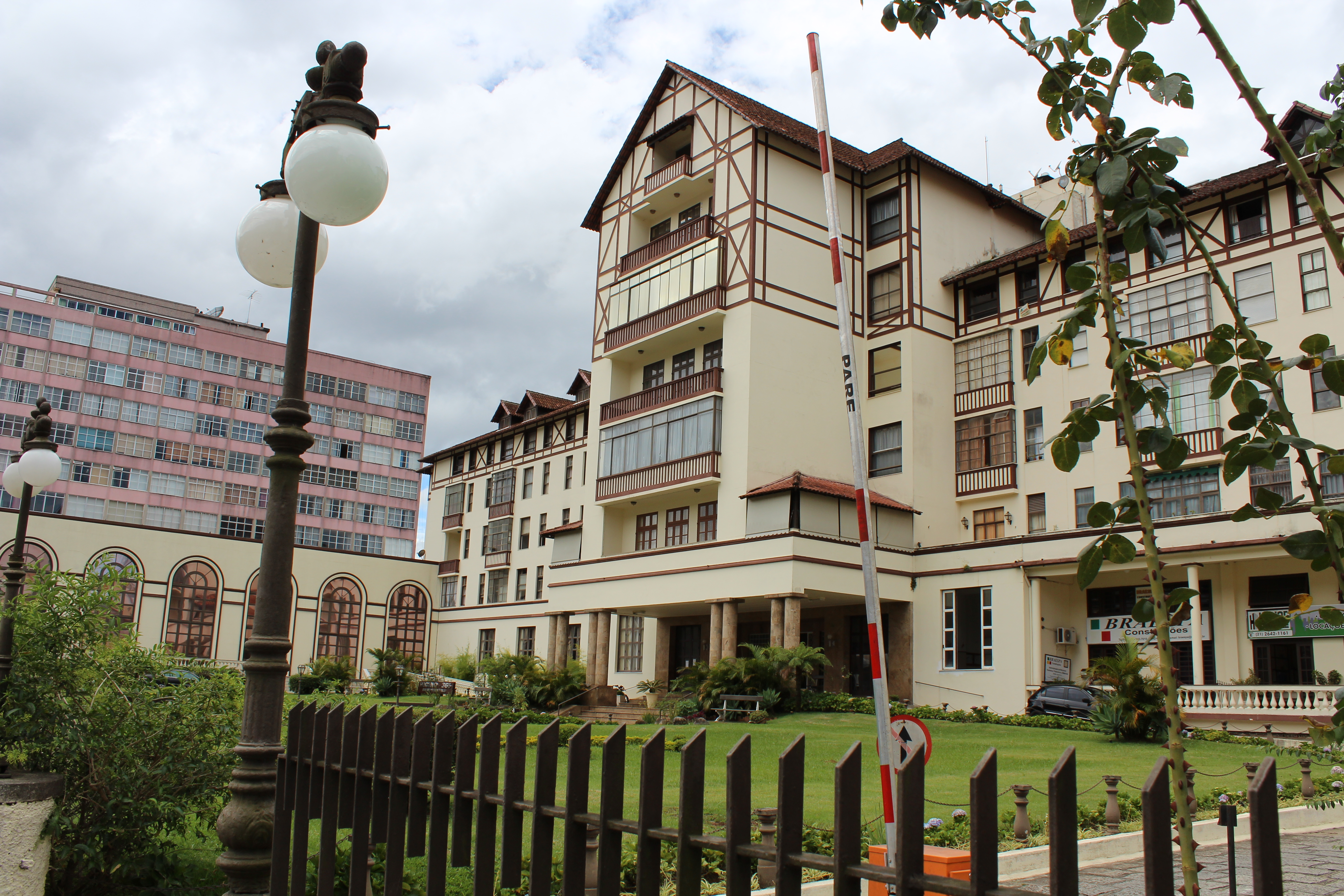
Teresópolis with a Portuguese hotel.

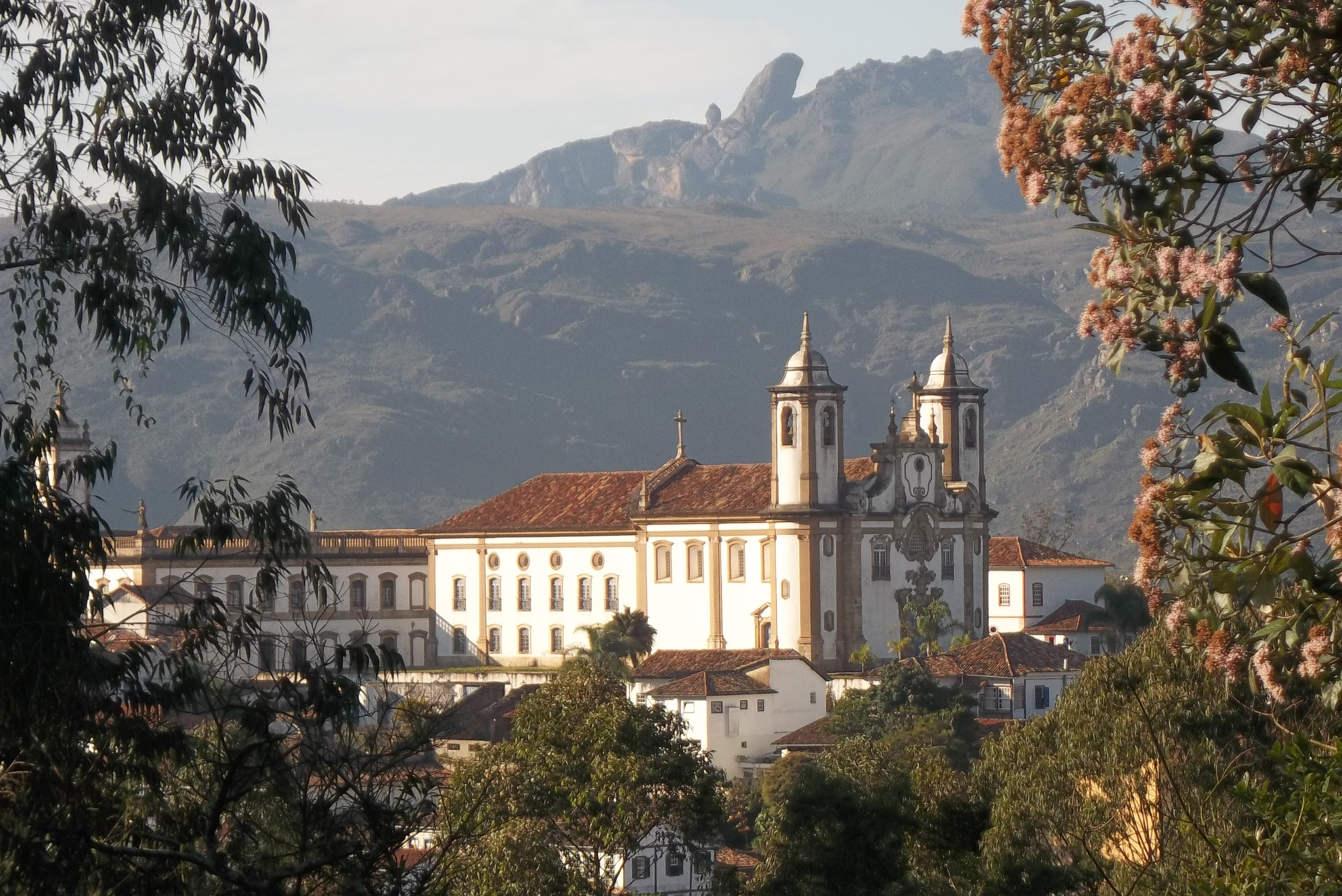
Ouro Preto colonized by Portuguese immigrants.

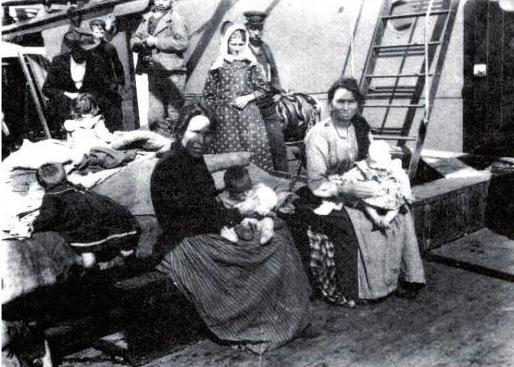
Portuguese immigrants arriving in Rio de Janeiro.

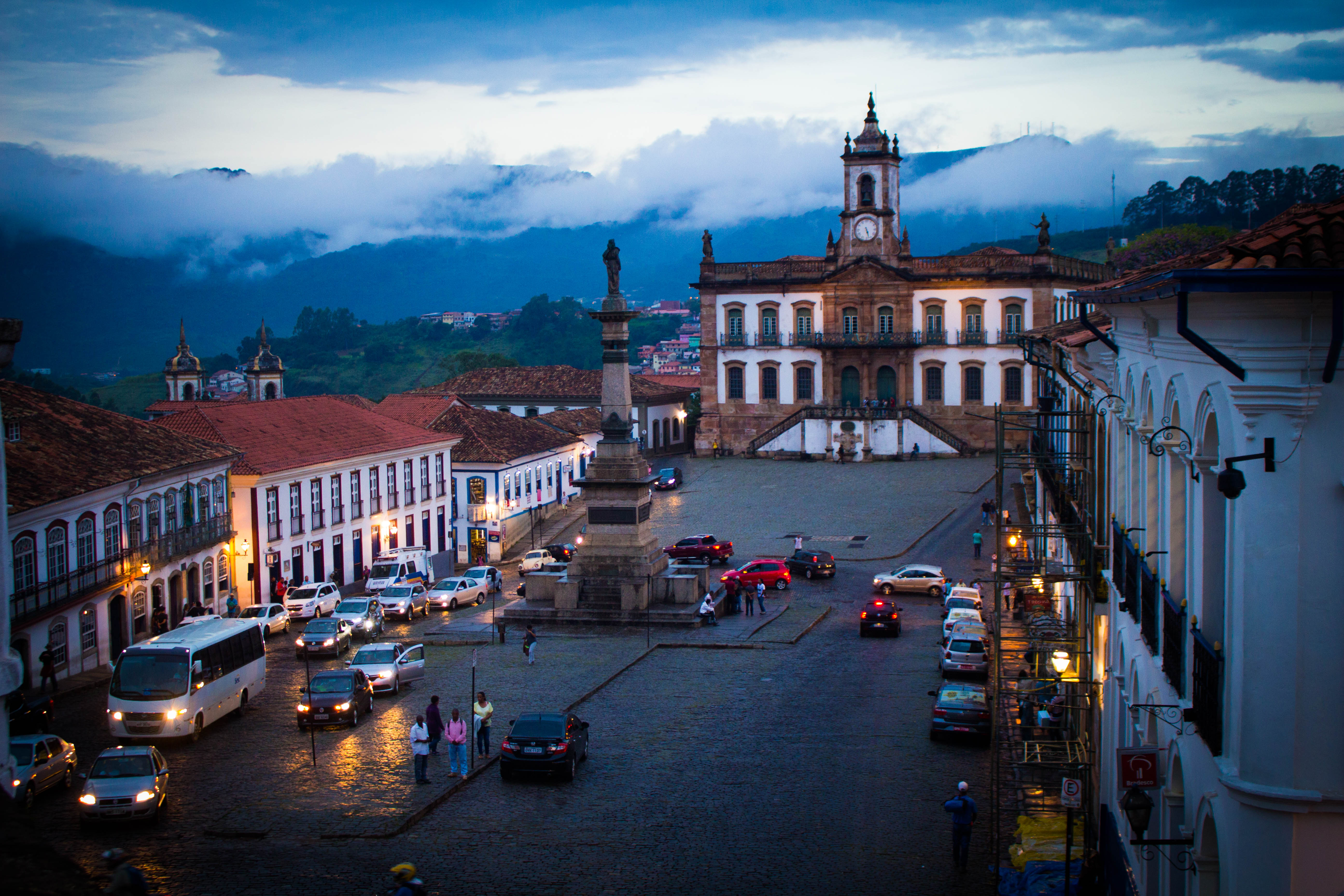
Ouro Preto colonized by Portuguese immigrants.

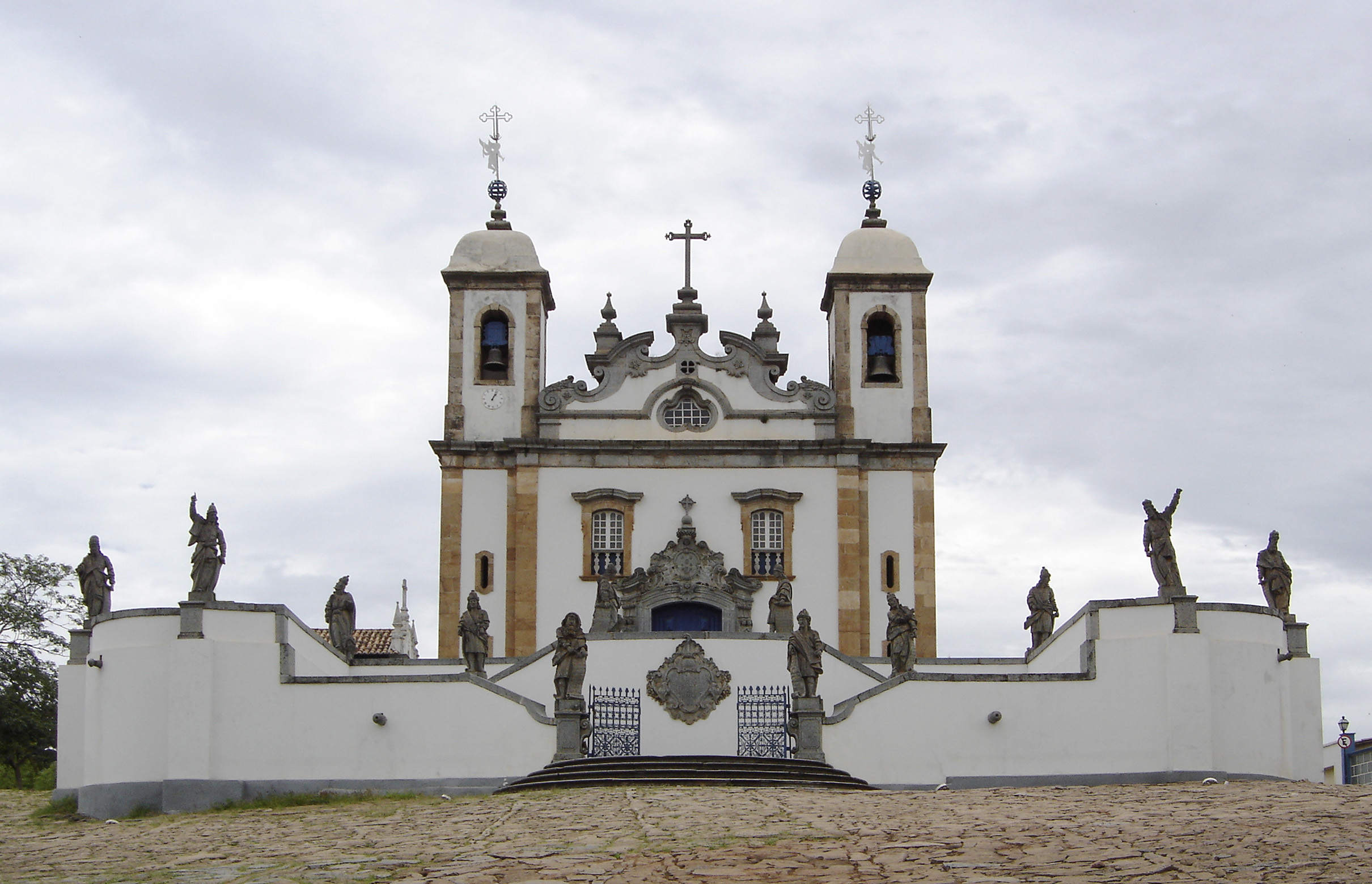
Congonhas with a Portuguese church.

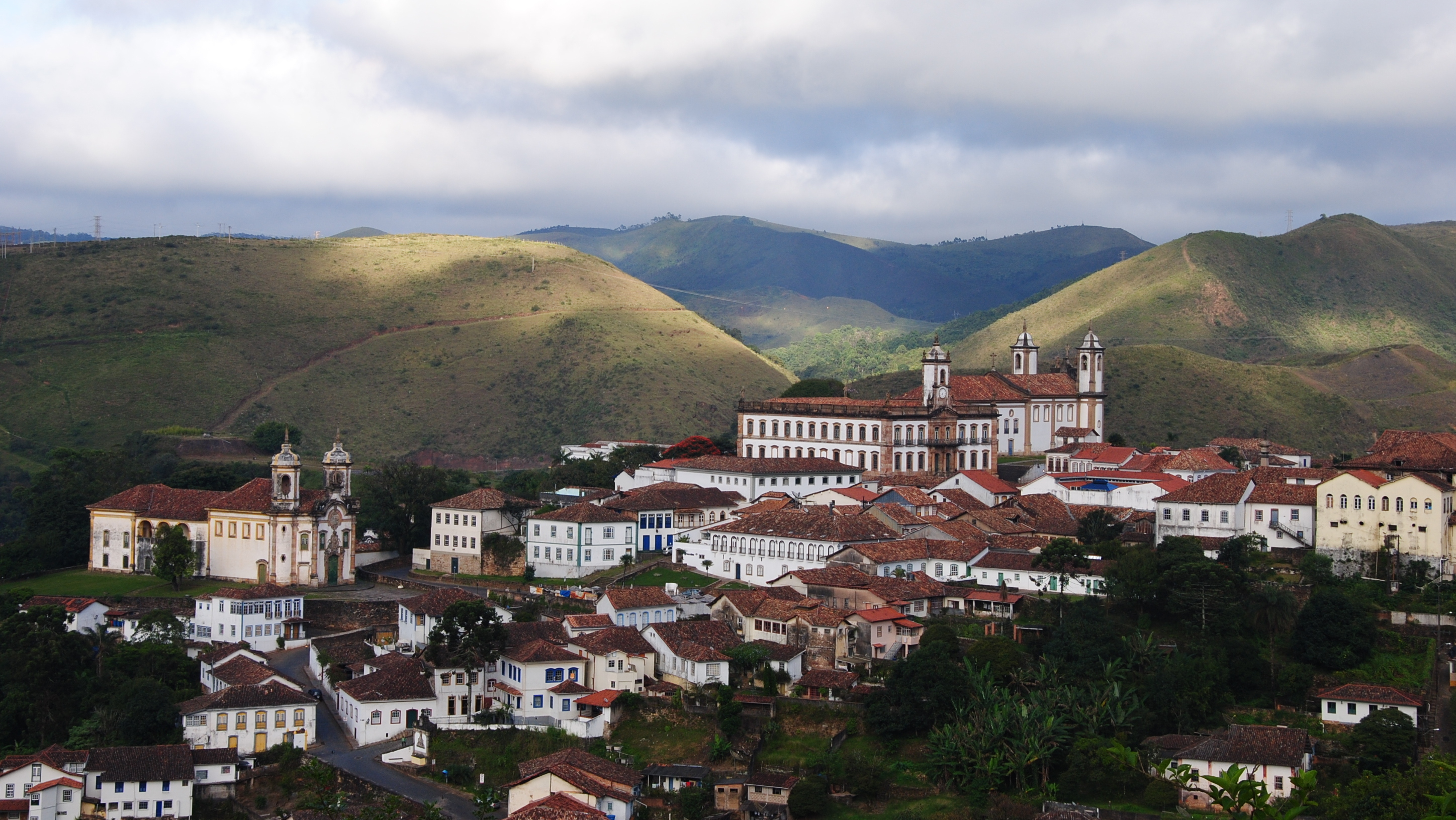
Ouro Preto colonized by Portuguese immigrants.

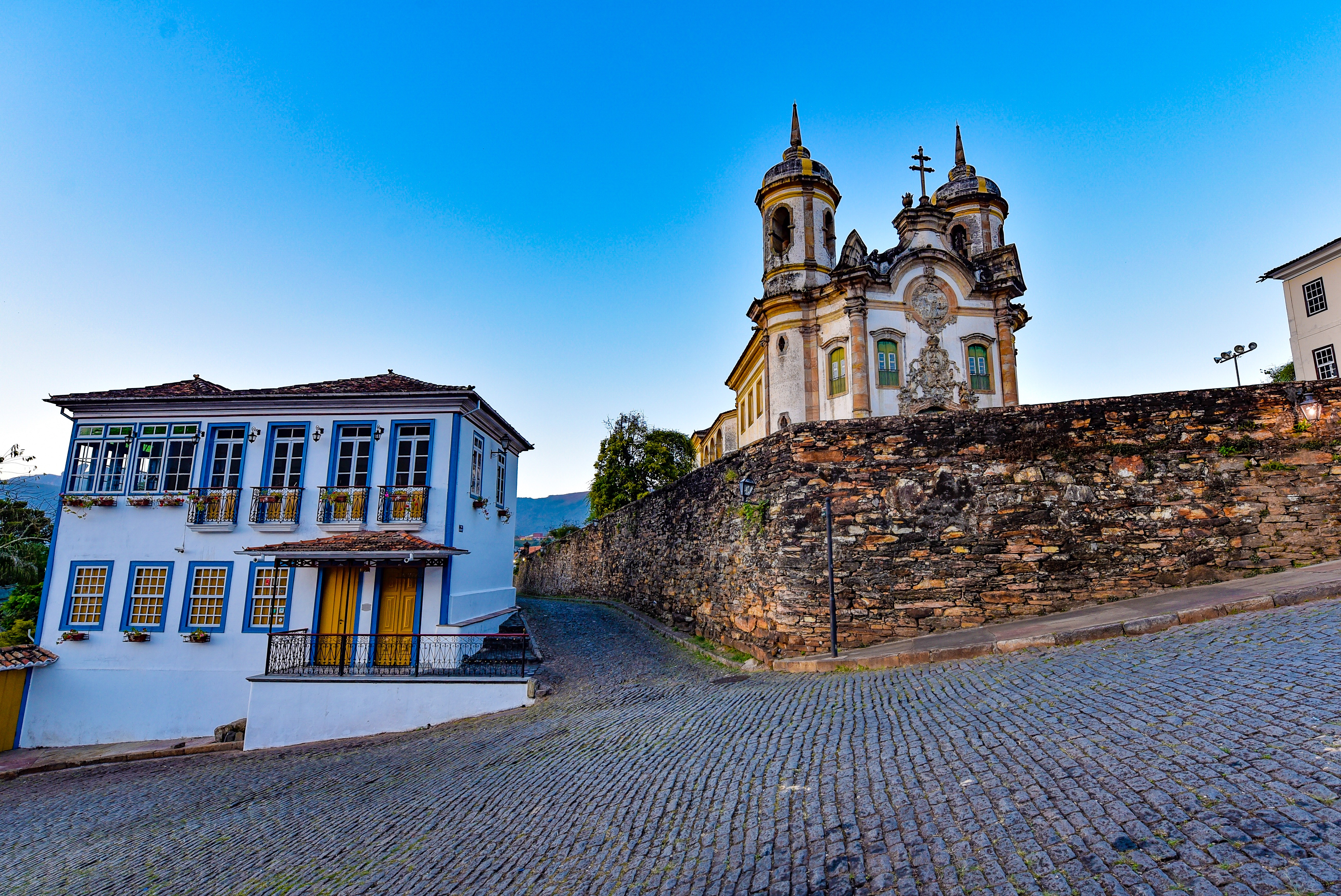
Ouro Preto and a Portuguese church.

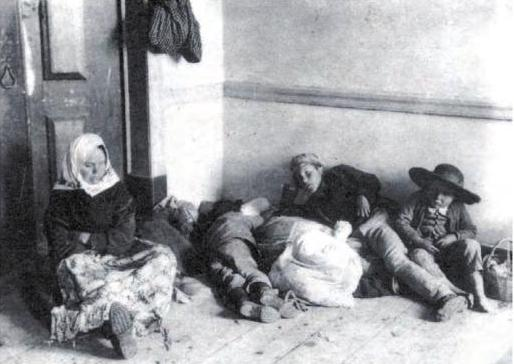
Portuguese immigrants arriving in Rio de Janeiro.

Immigration has been a very important demographic factor in the formation, structure and history of the population in Brazil, influencing culture, economy, education, racial issues, etc. Brazil has received the third largest number of immigrants in the Western Hemisphere, after the United States.

=== European diaspora ===
In the 100 years from 1872 to 1972, at least 5.3 million immigrants came to Brazil, of whom 31% were Portuguese, 30% Italian, 13% Spanish, 5% Japanese, 4% German and 16% of other unspecified nationalities.

Immigrants by Brazilian state according to 1920 Census (including naturalized immigrants)
State	Immigrants	Percentage within the state population
São Paulo	839,135	18.2%
Federal District (Rio de Janeiro)	252,958	22.0%
Espírito Santo	20,532	4.5%
Santa Catarina	39,212	5.8%
Rio Grande do Sul	165,974	7.5%
Mato Grosso	25,556	10.3%
Goiás	1,814	0.3%
Minas Gerais	91,349	1.5%
Rio de Janeiro	53,261	3.4%
Paraná	66,387	9.6%
Pernambuco	12,010	0.5%
Piauí	344	0.0%
Paraíba	661	0.0%
Pará	22,824	2.3%
Maranhão	1,681	0.2%
Ceará	980	0.0%
Bahia	10,999	0.3%
Amazonas	17,525	4.8%
Alagoas	747	0.0%
Sergipe	422	0.0%
Acre	3,564	3.8%

In 1897, São Paulo had twice as many Italians as Brazilians in the city. In 1893, 55% of the city's population was composed by immigrants and in 1901 more than 80% of the children were born to a foreign-born parent. According to the 1920 census, 35% of São Paulo's inhabitants were foreign born, compared to 36% in New York City. São Paulo's multicultural population could be compared to any major American, Canadian or Australian city. About 75% of the immigrants were Latin Europeans, particularly from three major sources: Italy, Portugal and Spain. The rest came from different parts of Europe, the Middle East and Japan. Some areas of the city remained almost exclusively settled by Italians until the arrival of waves of migrants from other parts of Brazil, particularly from the Northeast, starting in the late 1920s.

According to historian Samuel H. Lowrie, in the early 20th century the society of São Paulo was divided in three classes:

- The high group: composed of graduated people, mainly by Brazilians born to Brazilian parents, who were related to the high-class farmers or other people with privileges.
- The working class: composed of immigrants and their second and third generation descendants. They were the most numerous group, mainly factory workers or traders.
- The semi-dependent group: composed of former slaves and low-class workers of the Empire.

Owners of industries in São Paulo (1962)
Ethnic origin	Percentage
(Italy) Italians	35%
(Brazil) Brazilians	16%
(Portugal) Portuguese	12%
(Germany) Germans	10%
(Lebanon) (Syria) Lebanese and Syrian	9%
(Russia) Russians	2.9%
(Austria) Austrians	2.4%
(Switzerland) Swiss	2.4%
Other Europeans	9%
Others	2%

City of São Paulo in 1886
Immigrants	Percentage of immigrants in foreign born population
(Italy) Italians	48%
(Portugal) Portuguese	29%
(Germany) Germans	10%
(Spain) Spaniards	3%

City of São Paulo in 1893
Year	Immigrants	Percentage of the City
(Italy) Italians	45,457	35%
(Portugal) Portuguese	14,437	11%
(Spain) Spanish	4,818	3.7%

According to Lowrie, the fact that Brazil already had a long history of racial mixture and that most of the immigrants in São Paulo came from Latin European countries, reduced the cases of racism and mutual intolerance. However, the Brazilian high class was more intolerant, with most of them marrying other members of the elite. In some cases, to marry an immigrant was accepted if the person had achieved fortune or had some prestige. Lowrie reports that as much as 40% of the São Paulo high-class society mixed with an immigrant within the next three generations.

While in São Paulo the Italians predominated, in Rio de Janeiro the Portuguese remained as the main group. In 1929, as many as 272,338 Portuguese immigrants were recorded in the Federal District of Brazil (nowadays the city of Rio de Janeiro), more Portuguese born people than any other city in the world, except for Lisbon (which had 591,939 inhabitants in 1930).

City of Rio de Janeiro (Guanabara)
Year	Immigrants	Percentage of the City
1872	84,283	30.65%
1890	124,352 / 155,202	23.79% / 29.69%
1900	195,894	24.14%
1906	210,515	25.94%
1920	239,129	20.65%
1940	228,633	12.96%
1950	210,454	8.85%

City of Rio de Janeiro (1890)
Group	Population	Percentage of the City
(Portugal) Portuguese immigrants	106,461	20.36%
(Brazil) (Portugal) Brazilians who were born to a Portuguese father or mother	161,203	30.84%
(Brazil) (Portugal) Portuguese immigrants and descendants	267,664	51.2%

Rio de Janeiro City in 1940 (Guanabara)
Immigrants	Population
(Portugal) Portuguese	154,662
(Italy) Italians	17,457
(Spain) Spaniards	12,212
(Germany) Germans	10,185
(Japan) Japanese	538
Others	33,579

In the South of Brazil, there were three main groups of immigrants: Germans, Italians and Slavs (mainly Poles and Ukrainians). The Germans had been settling Rio Grande do Sul since 1824. The first settlers came from Holstein, Hamburg, Mecklenburg-Vorpommern and Hannover. Later, people from Hunsrück and Rhineland-Palatinate predominated. There were also people from Pomerania, Westphalia and Württemberg. These immigrants were attracted to work as small farmers in the region of São Leopoldo. As a result of the great internal migration of people in Rio Grande do Sul, Germans and second generation descendants started to move to other areas of the province.

A similar process has occurred in Santa Catarina, with initially two main destinations for German immigrants (Blumenau, created in 1850, and Joinville in 1851) and then the immigrants or their descendants moved to other areas. Arriving in larger numbers than Germans, in the 1870s, groups of Italians started settling northeast Rio Grande do Sul. Similar to Germans, they were also attracted to develop small familiar farming production. In Paraná, on the other hand, the main group of immigrants was composed of Eastern Europeans, particularly Poles.

In southern Brazil, the immigrants settled in colônias (colonies), which were rural areas, composed of many small farms, settled by the families. Some of these colonies had a great development and gave birth to major Brazilian cities, such as the former German community of Joinville (600,000 inhabitants—the largest city of the state of Santa Catarina) or the former Italian community of Caxias do Sul (500,000 inhabitants—the second largest city of Rio Grande do Sul). Other colonies did not have a great development and remained small and agrarian. In these places, it is possible to feel more intensely the impact of the immigration, as many of these towns are still predominantly settled by a single ethnic group.

First settlers in Londrina (1930)
Ethnic group	Population
Brazilians	1,823
Italians	611
Japanese	533
Germans	510
Spanish	303
Portuguese	218
Polish	193
Ukrainians	172
Hungarians	138
Czechoslovaks	51
Russians	44
Swiss	34
Austrians	29
Lithuanians	21
Yugoslavs	15
Romanians	12
English	7
Argentinians	5
Syrians	5
Danes	3
Australians	2
Belgians	2
Bulgarians	2
French	2
Latvian	2
Liechtensteiner	2
U.S. citizens	2
Swedes	2
Estonians	1
Indian	1
Norwegian	1
Total Foreign Born Population	2.923( 61.6%)

Some southern Brazilian towns with a notable main ancestry
Town name	State	Main ancestry	Percentage
Nova Veneza	Santa Catarina	(Italy) Italian	95%
Pomerode	Santa Catarina	(Germany) German	90%
Dom Feliciano	Rio Grande do Sul	(Poland) Polish	90%
Prudentópolis	Paraná	(Ukraine) Ukrainian	70%
Treze Tílias	Santa Catarina	(Austria) Austrian	60%

== Statistics ==
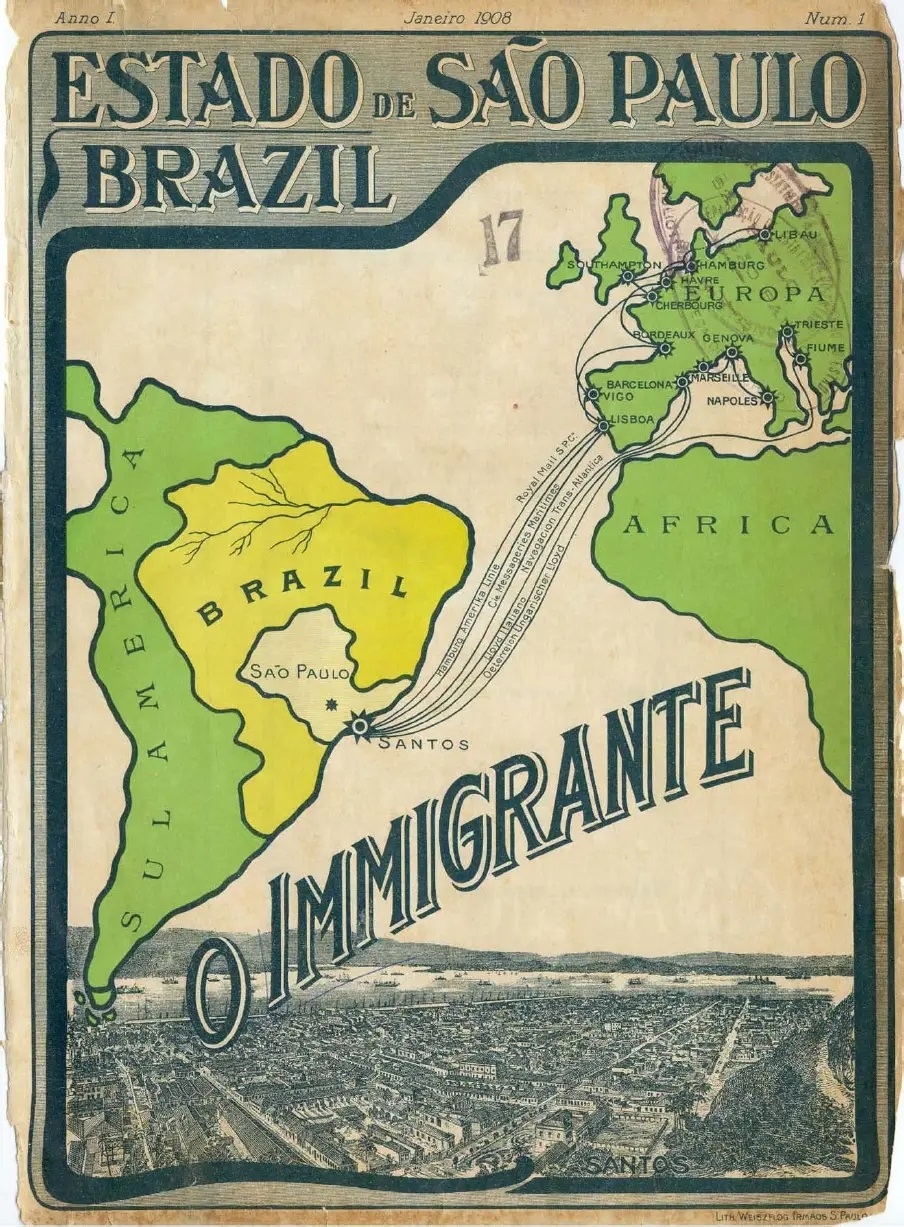
Cover of the magazine "O Immigrante", published by Italian immigrants in Brazil.

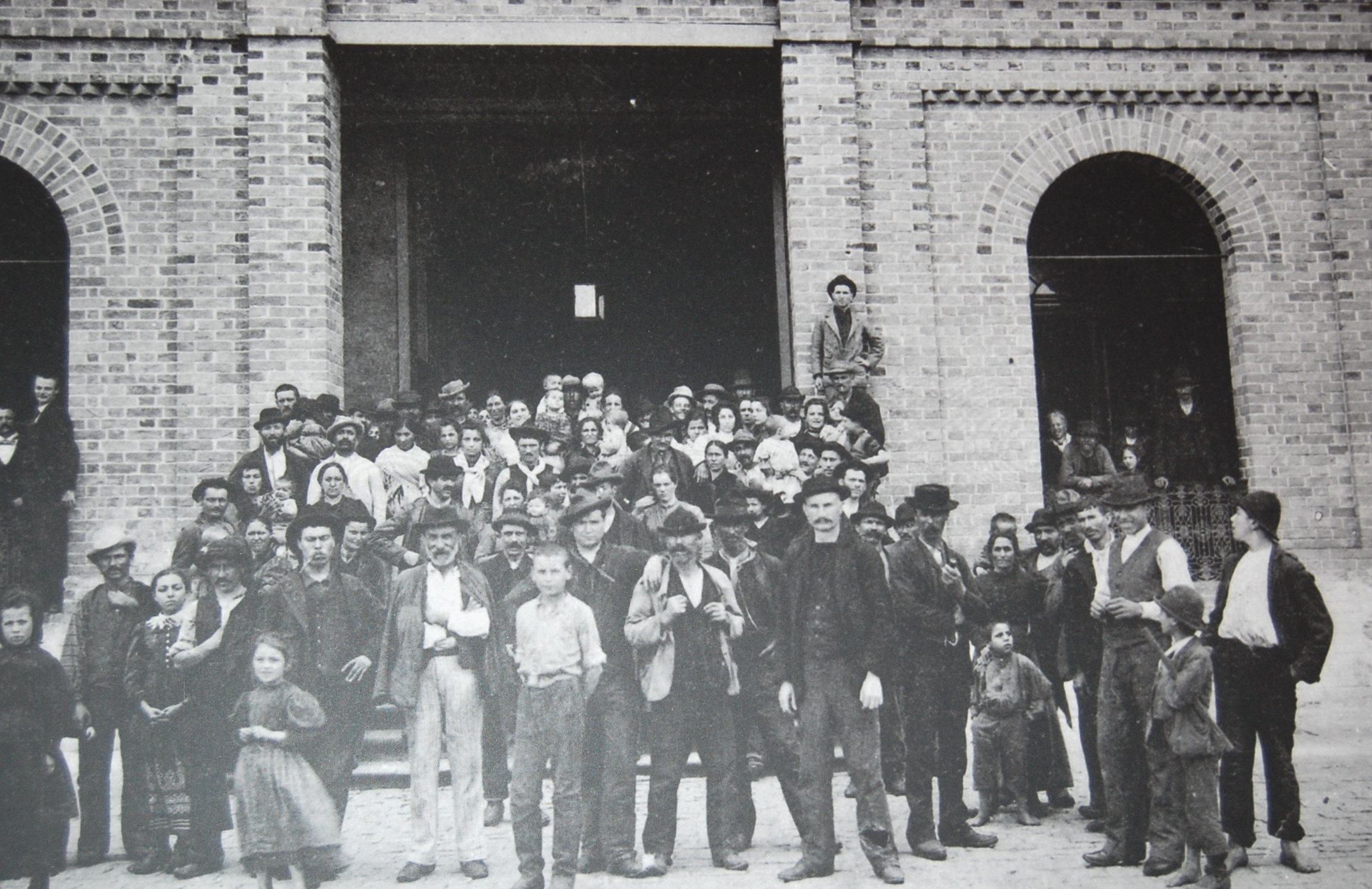
European immigrants in São Paulo.

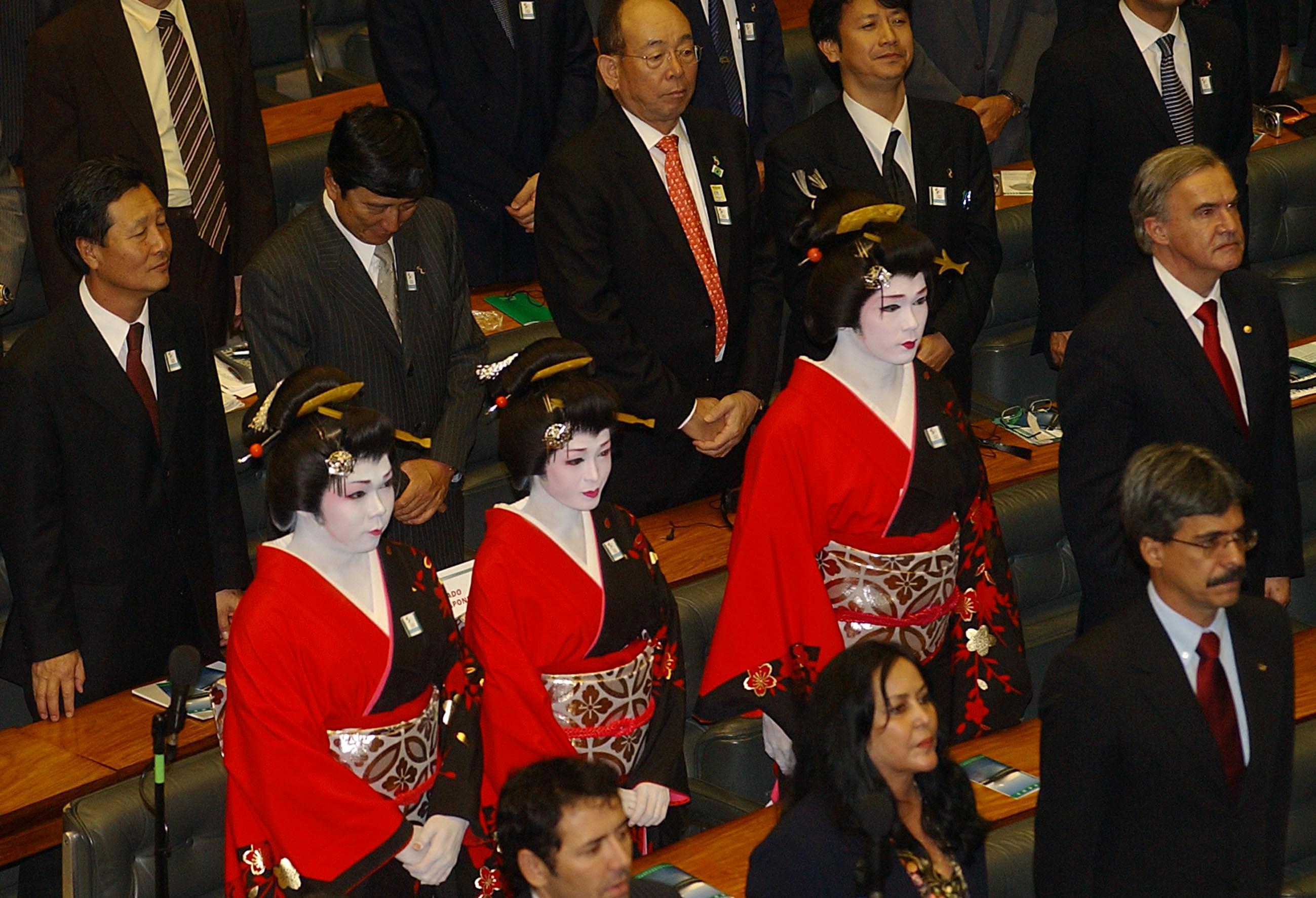
Session in honor of the visit of Prince Naruhito, heir to the throne of Japan, to the National Congress of Brazil, in Brasília. In the year that celebrated the centenary of Japanese immigration to Brazil.

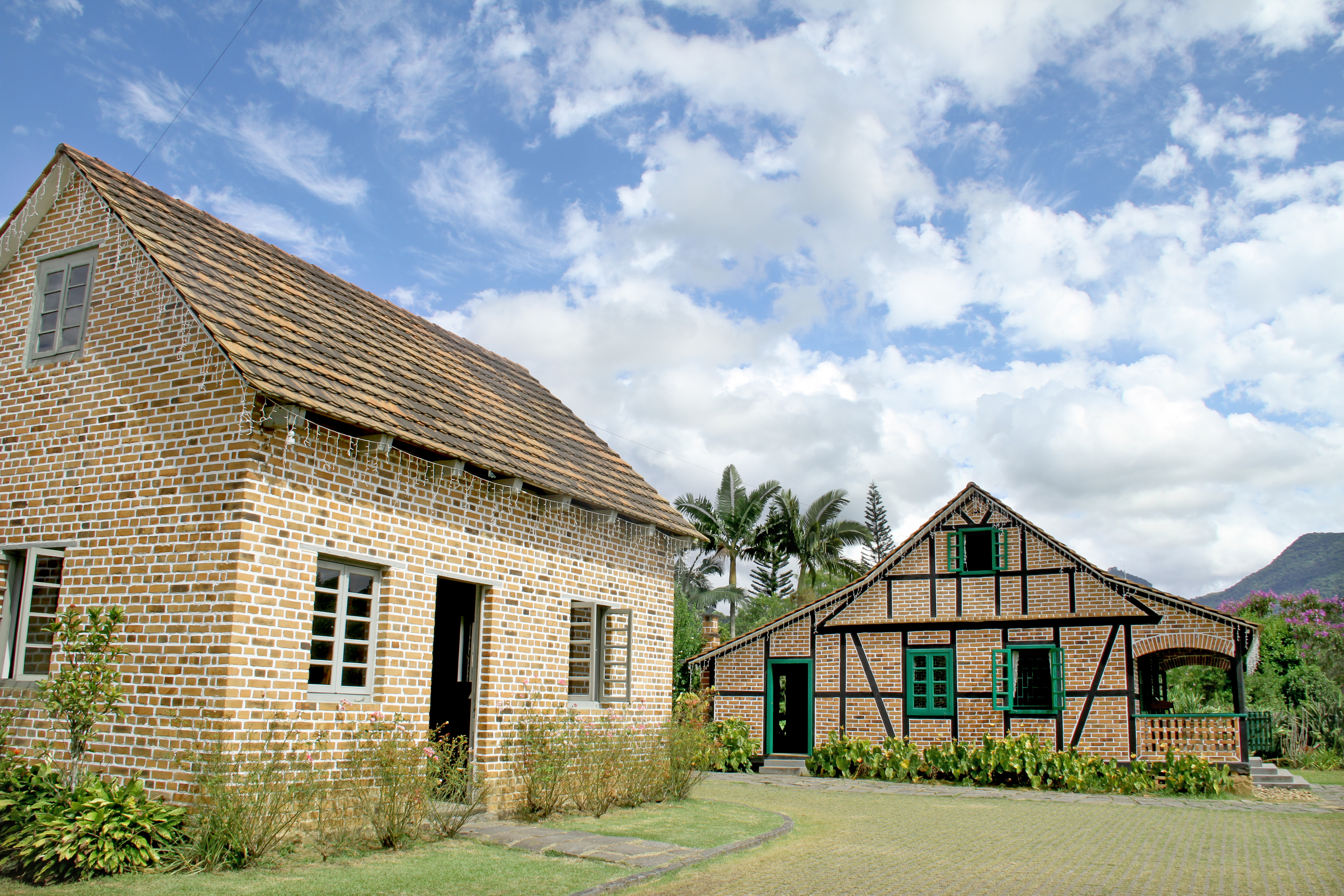
German community in Pomerode.

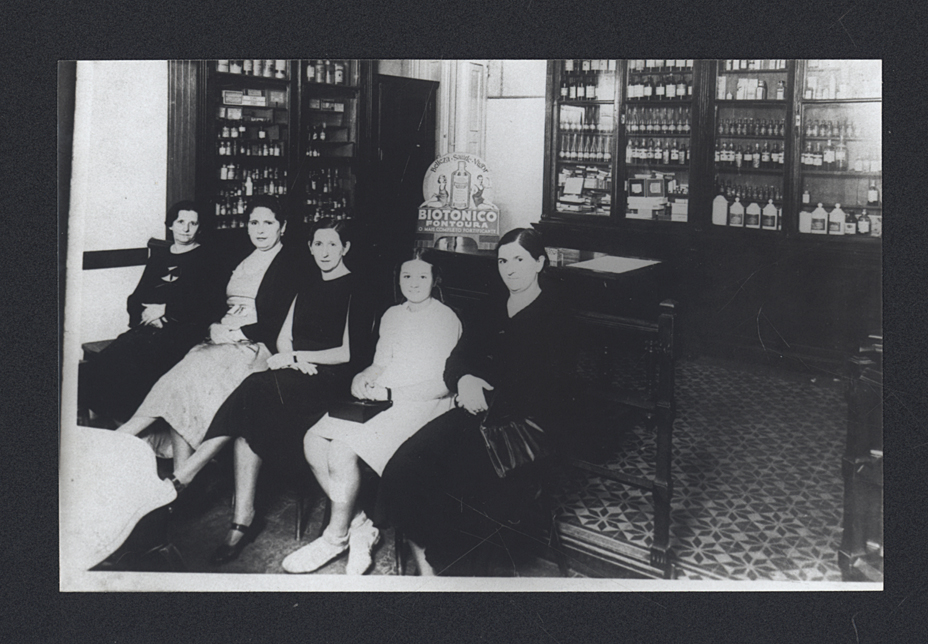
Spaniards in São Paulo.

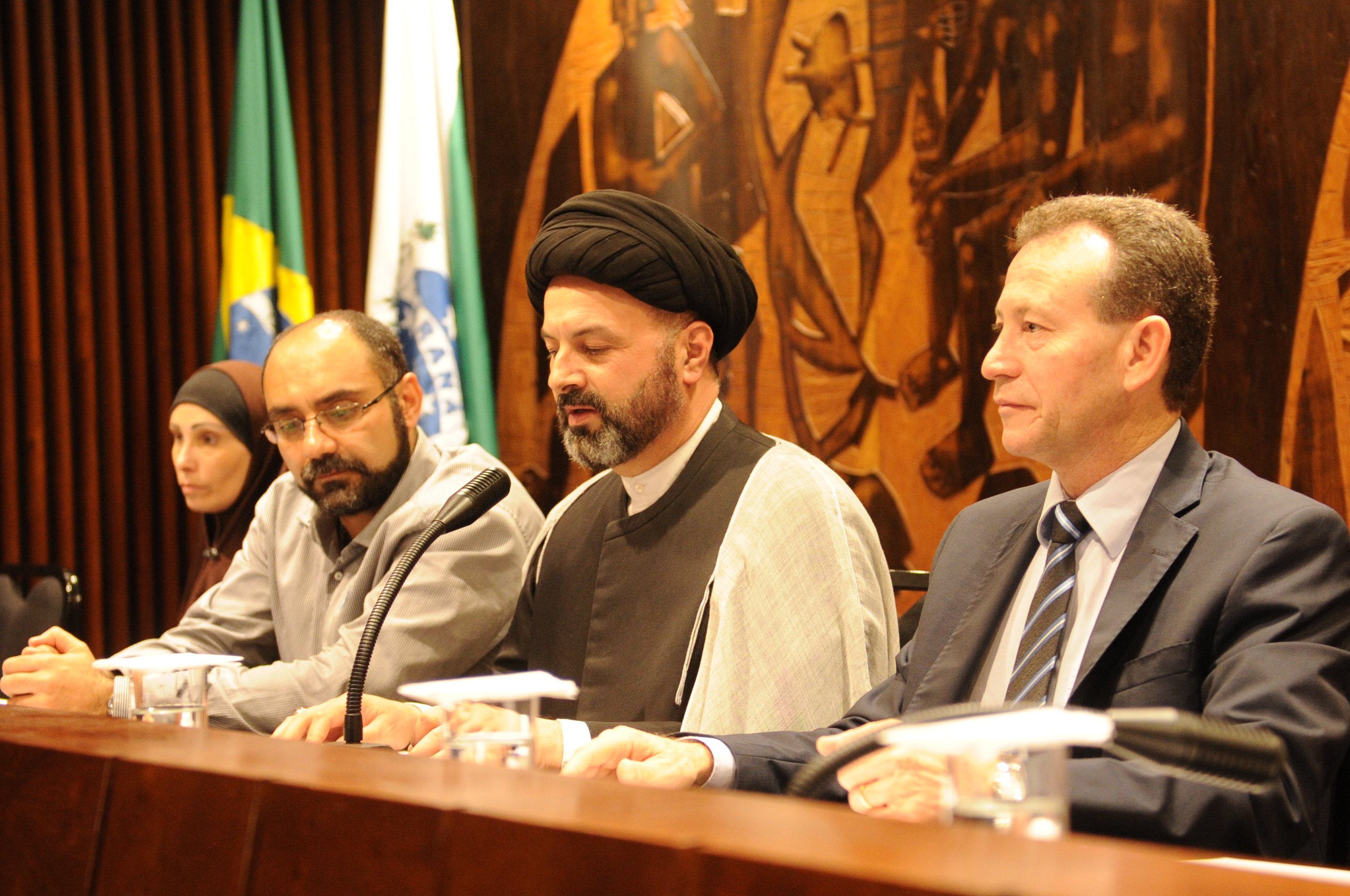
Arab community in Curitiba.

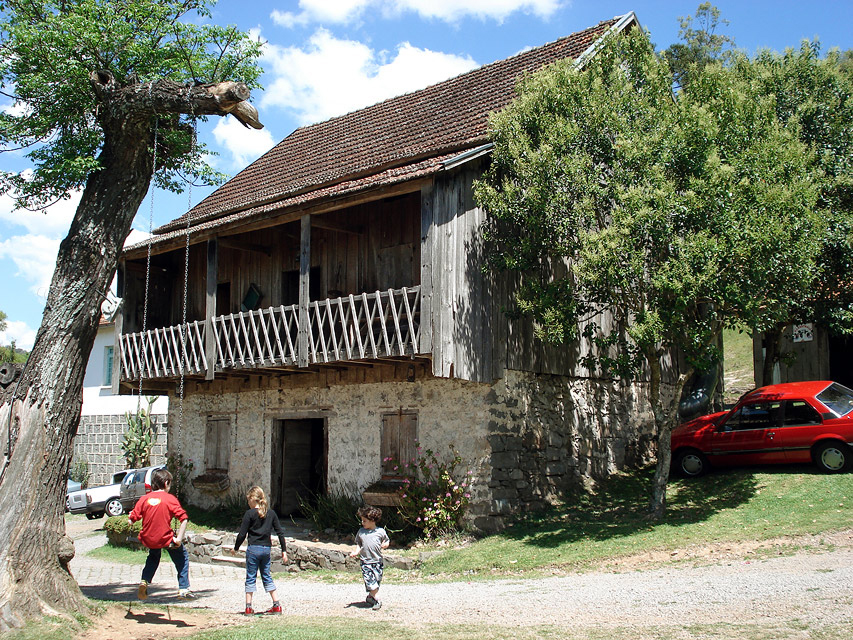
Italian community in Caxias do Sul.

Immigrants established in São Paulo state in 1940
Immigrants	Population
Italians	694,489
Spaniards	374,658
Portuguese	362,156
Japanese	85,103
Germans	50,507
Austrians	33,133

Main groups of settlers/slaves and immigrants in Brazil, according to Fernando L. B. Basto
Origin	Population
Africans (1550–1850)	3,000,000
Portuguese, pre-independence (1500–1822); Portuguese, post-independence (1837–1968)	800,000; 1,766,771
Italians (1836–1968)	1,620,344
Spaniards (1841–1968)	719,555
Germans (1836–1968)	257,457
Japanese (1908–1968)	243,441
Russians (1871–1968)	119,215
Lebanese (1871–1968)	100,246
Austrians (1868–1968)	98,457
Poles (1892–1968)	54,078
French (1842–1968)	50,341
Romanians (1908–1968)	40,799
Americans (1884–1968)	38,934
English (1847–1968) 🏴󠁧󠁢󠁥󠁮󠁧󠁿	38,080
Lithuanians (1920–1963)	29,002
Yugoslavs (1920–1968)	27,726
Argentines (1884–1968)	25,553
Syrians (1892–1968)	24,394
Swiss (1820–1968)	21,704
Greeks (1893–1968)	16,684
Dutch (1884–1968)	15,829
Hungarians (1908–1968)	13,592
Uruguayans (1884–1968)	10,836
Belgians (1847–1968)	9,173
Chinese (1895–1968)	7,996
Swedes (1853–1968)	7,994
Czechs and Slovaks (1920–1968)	6,538
Danes (1886–1968)	4,029
Jordanians (1953–1968)	3,567
Estonians (1923–1961)	2,803
Koreans (1956–1968)	2,500
Latvians (1924–1961)	2,444
Egyptians (1895–1968)	2,283
Paraguayans (1886–1968)	2,271
Canadians (1925–1968)	1,631
Peruvians (1885–1968)	1,600
Ukrainians (1920–1967)	1,415
Norwegians (1888–1968)	1,136
Venezuelans (1886–1968)	1,076
Finns (1819–1968)	992
Iranians (1922–1968)	735
Bulgarians (1908–1968)	557
Luxembourgers (1919–1968)	473
Australians (1946–1968)	320
Irish (1940–1968)	176
Scottish (1945–1961)	6

- Most of the Poles immigrated to Brazil with German, Russian or Austro-Hungarian passports, the Ukrainians with Austro-Hungarian passports and the Hungarians with Romanian passports.

Arrival of settlers, slaves, and immigrants, by origin, periods from 1500 to 1933 Source: Brazilian Institute for Geography and Statistics (IBGE)
	Period									
Origin	1500–1700	1701–1760	1761–1829	1830–1855	1856–1883	1884–1893	1894–1903	1904–1913	1914–1923	1924–1933
Africans	510,000	958,000	1,720,000	618,000	—	—	—	—	—	—
(Portugal) Portuguese	100,000	600,000	26,000	16,737	116,000	170,621	155,542	384,672	201,252	233,650
(Italy) Italians	—	—	—	—	100,000	510,533	537,784	196,521	86,320	70,177
(Spain) Spaniards	—	—	—	—	—	113,116	102,142	224,672	94,779	52,405
(Germany) Germans	—	—	5,003	2,008	30,000	22,778	6,698	33,859	29,339	61,723
(Japan) Japanese	—	—	—	—	—	—	—	11,868	20,398	110,191
(Lebanon) (Syria) Lebanese & Syrians	—	—	—	—	—	96	7,124	45,803	20,400	20,400
(Russia) (Poland) (Ukraine) Slavs	—	—	—	—	—	66,524	42,820	109,222	51,493	

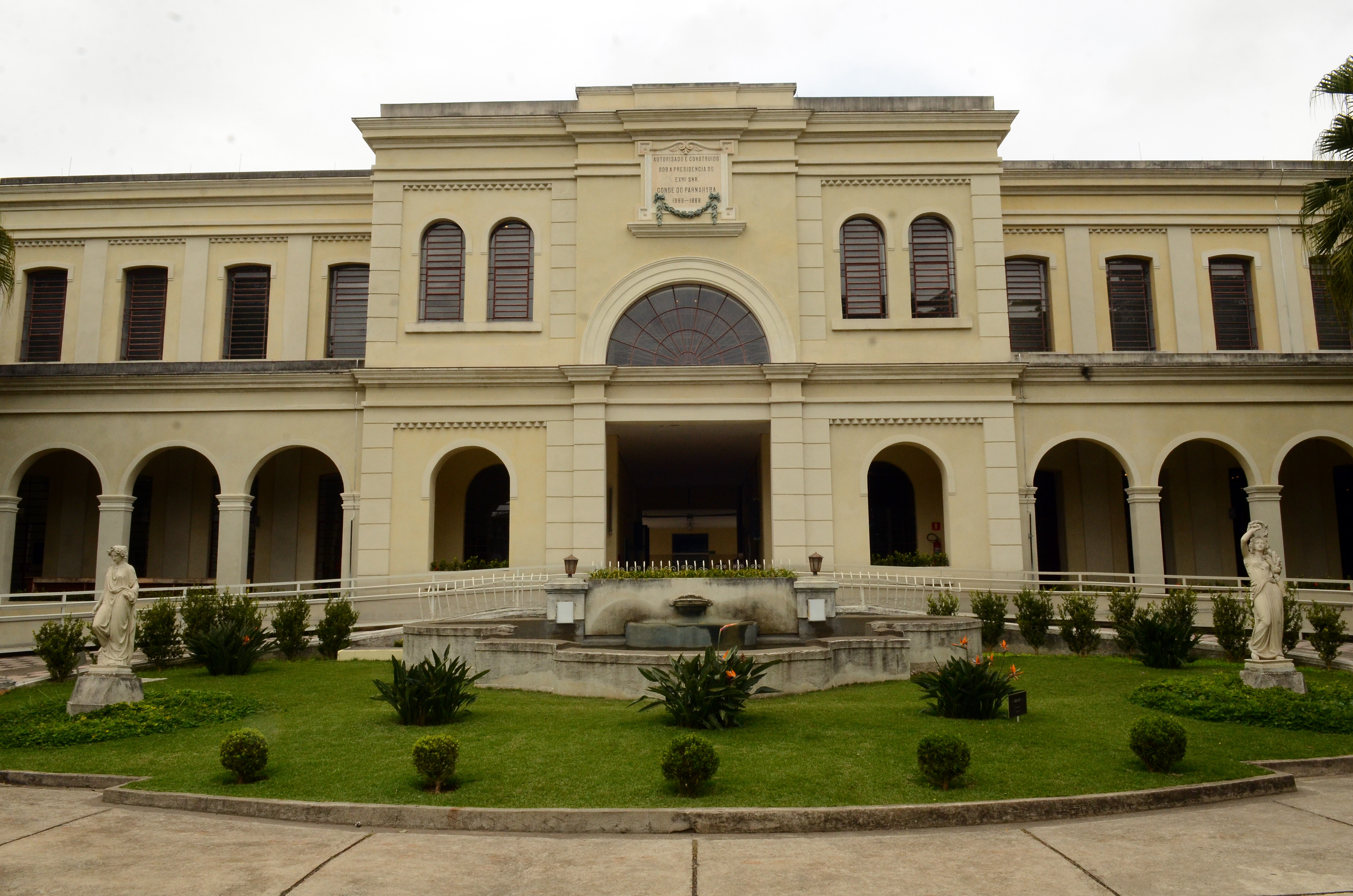
Museu da Imigração in São Paulo.

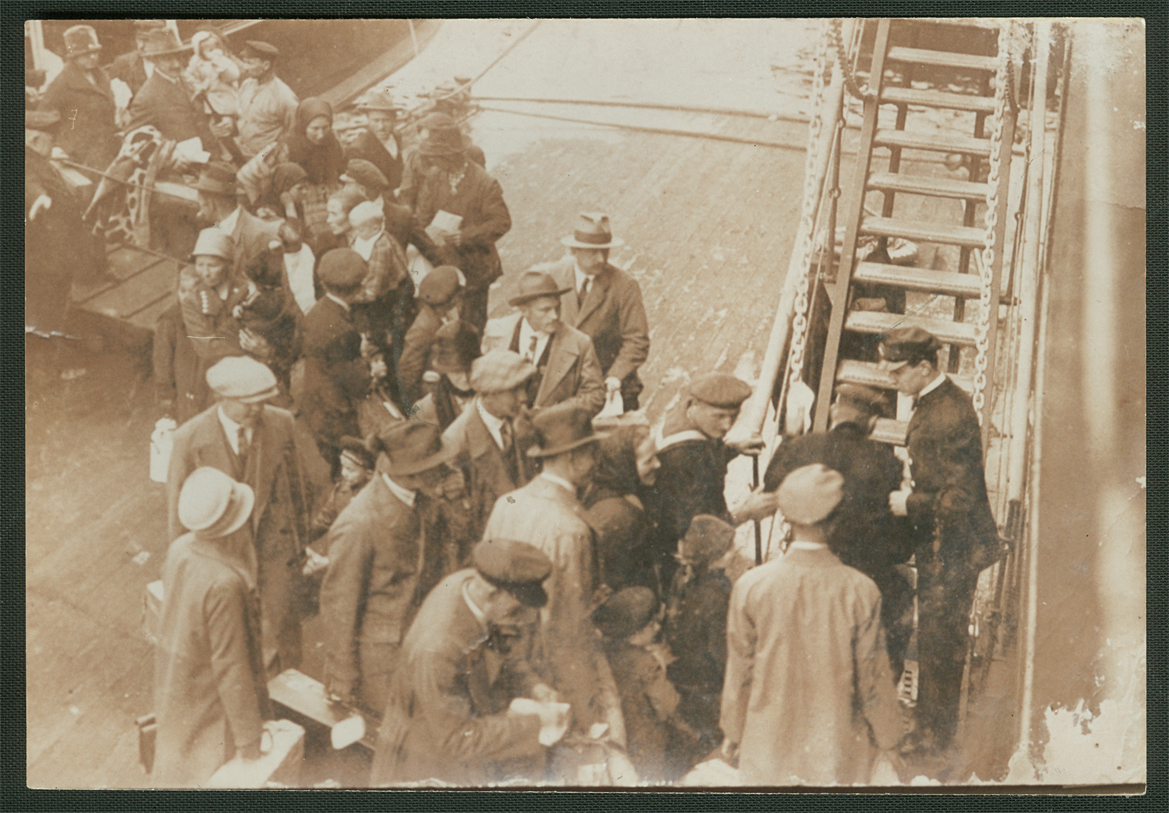
Swiss immigrants moving to Brazil.

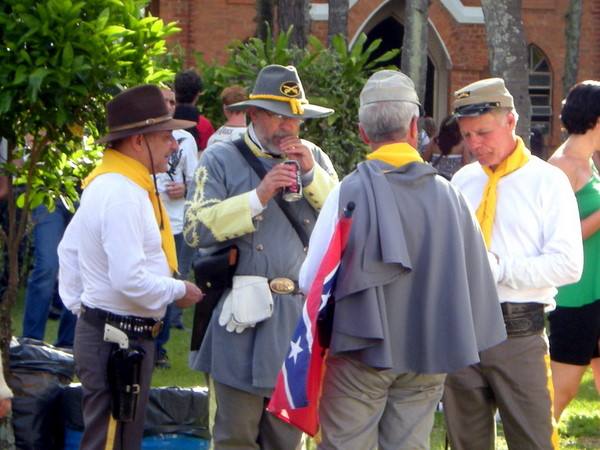
American descendants in Santa Bárbara d'Oeste.

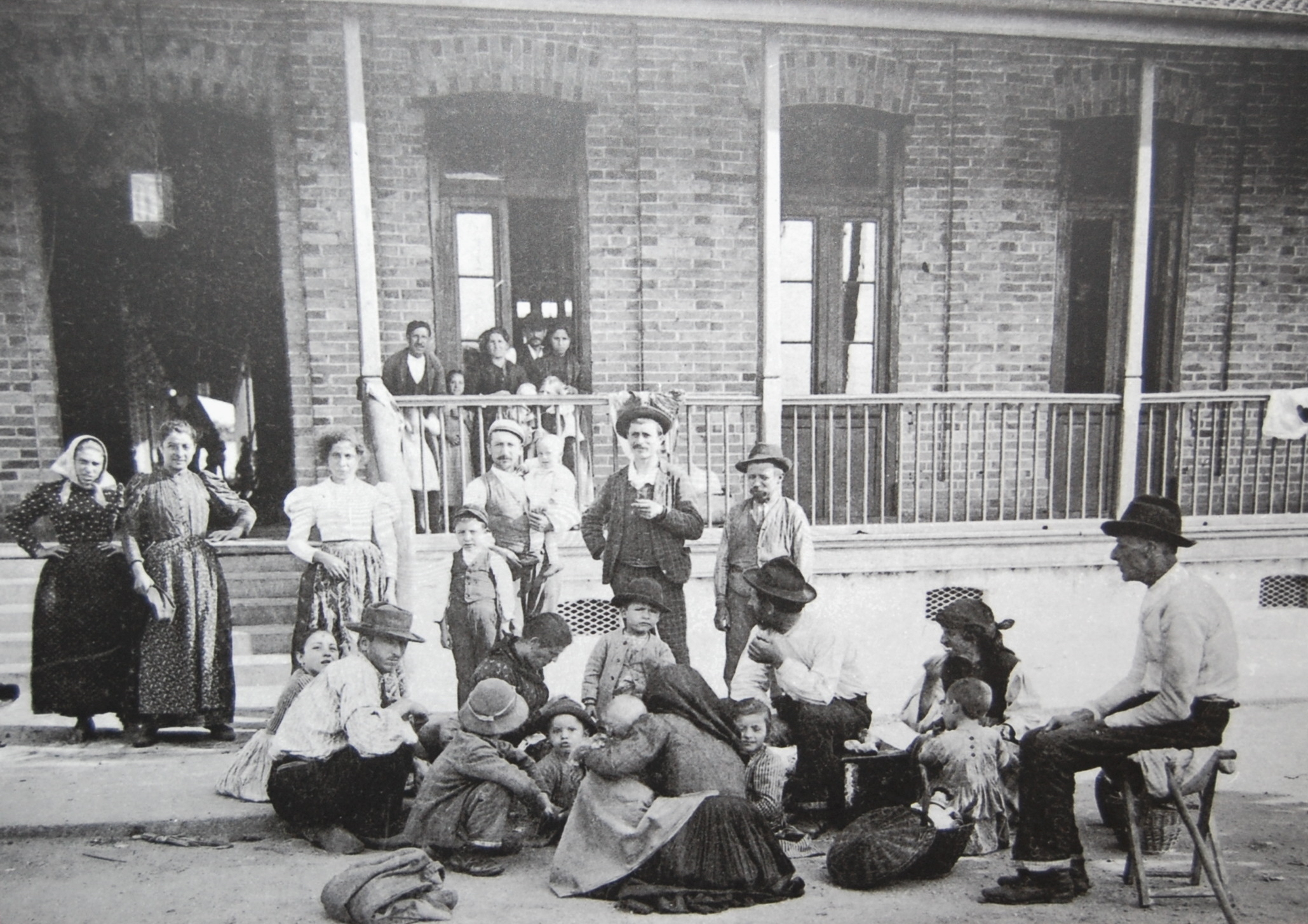
European immigrants in São Paulo.

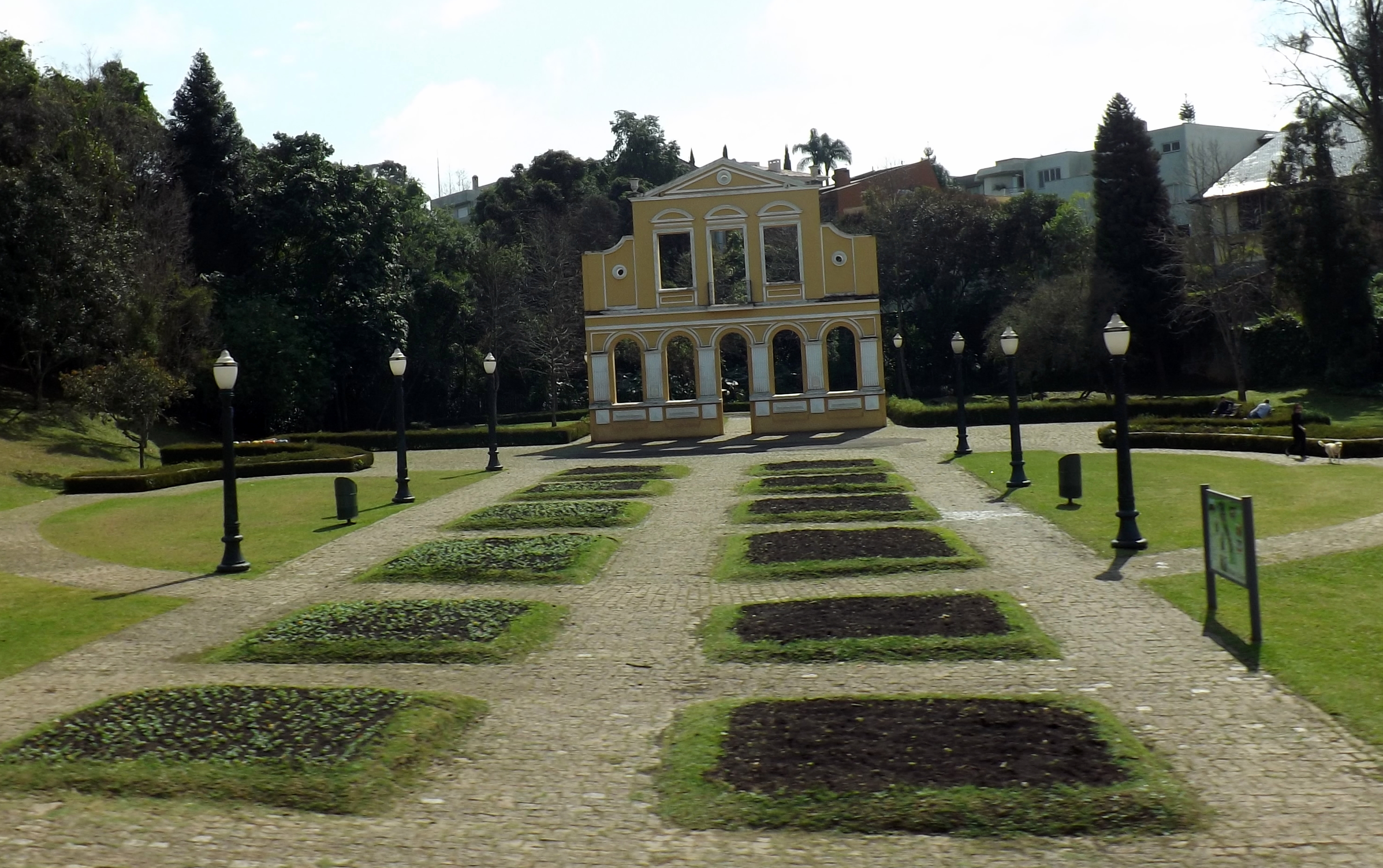
German community in Curitiba.

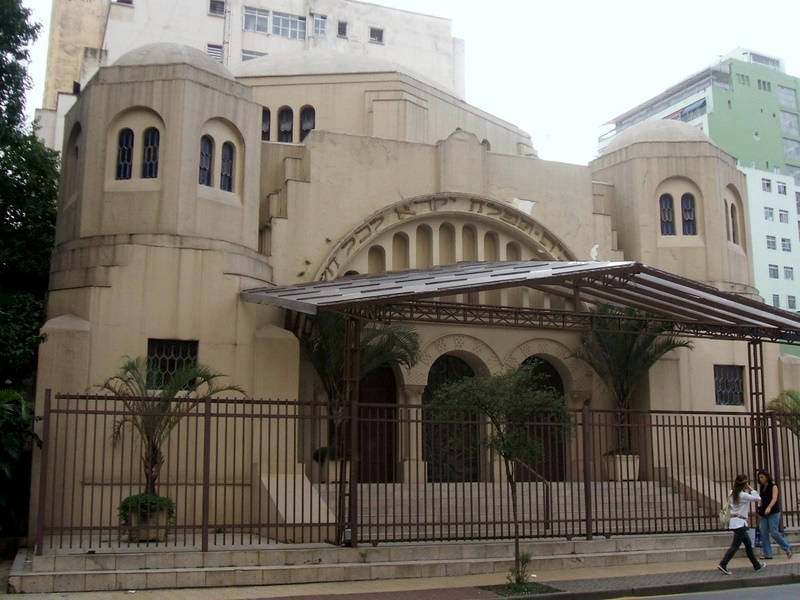
Jewish community in São Paulo.

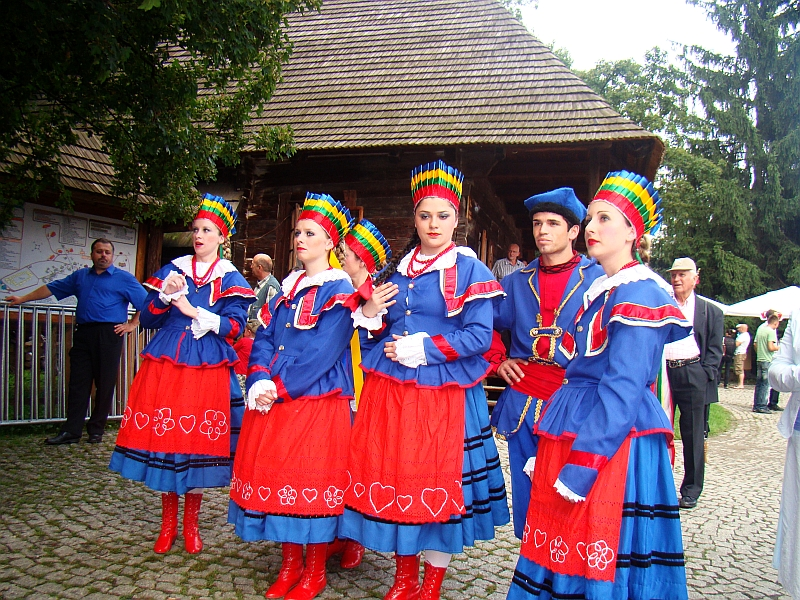
Polish descendants in Brazil.

Farms with foreign ownership (1920)
Immigrants	Farms
Italians	35,984
Portuguese	9,552
Germans	6,887
Spanish	4,725
Russians	4,471
Austrians	4,292
Japanese	1,167

Hungarian Immigration to Brazil
Passport	Immigrants
Romanian	30,437
Yugoslav	16,518
Hungarian	6,501
Austrian	2,742
Czechoslovak	518
Total	56,716

Lebanese and Syrians Immigrants (1920) – French Consulate Estimation
Location	Immigrants
São Paulo and Santos	130,000
Pará	20,000
Rio de Janeiro	15,000
Rio Grande do Sul	14,000
Bahia	12,000

Main groups of settlers and immigrants in Brazil, from 1500 to 1972, according to multiple sources
Nationality/origin	Number of settlers
Africans^{1}	4,335,800
Portuguese	2,714,314
Italians	1,649,536
Spaniards	717,424
Germans^{2}	260,478
Japanese	248,007
Poles^{3}	200,000
Lebanese/ Syrians^{4}	140,464
Russians^{5}	118,600
French	100,000
Ukrainians	61,000
Lithuanians	57,620
Hungarians	56,716
Greeks	17,018
Dutch	14,298
Scandinavians	13,159
Americans	10,000

^1It includes all people who were brought from Sub-Saharan Africa.

^2It does not include Germans who immigrated with Russian and Soviet passports (see Volga Germans).

^3Many Poles immigrated to Brazil with German, Russian or Austro-Hungarian passports.

^4It includes Greeks and Armenians who immigrated with Ottoman passports (see Ottoman Greeks and Ottoman Armenians) and other Middle Eastern peoples such as Palestinians and Egyptians.

^5It includes a majority of Poles, Ukrainians, Balts, Germans, Ashkenazi Jews and other peoples who immigrated with Russian or Soviet passports.

== Consequences ==
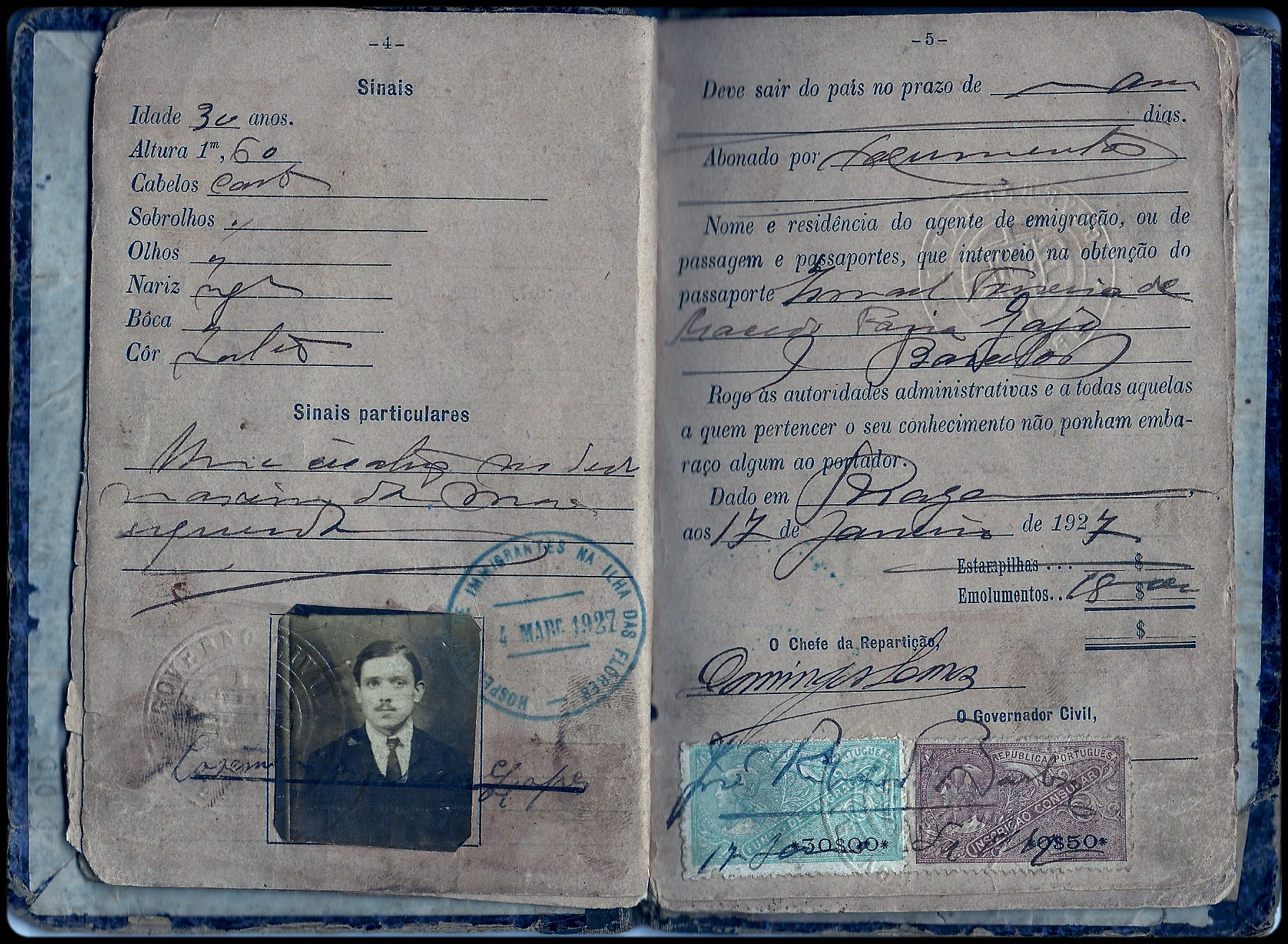
Passport of a Portuguese immigrant, 1927.

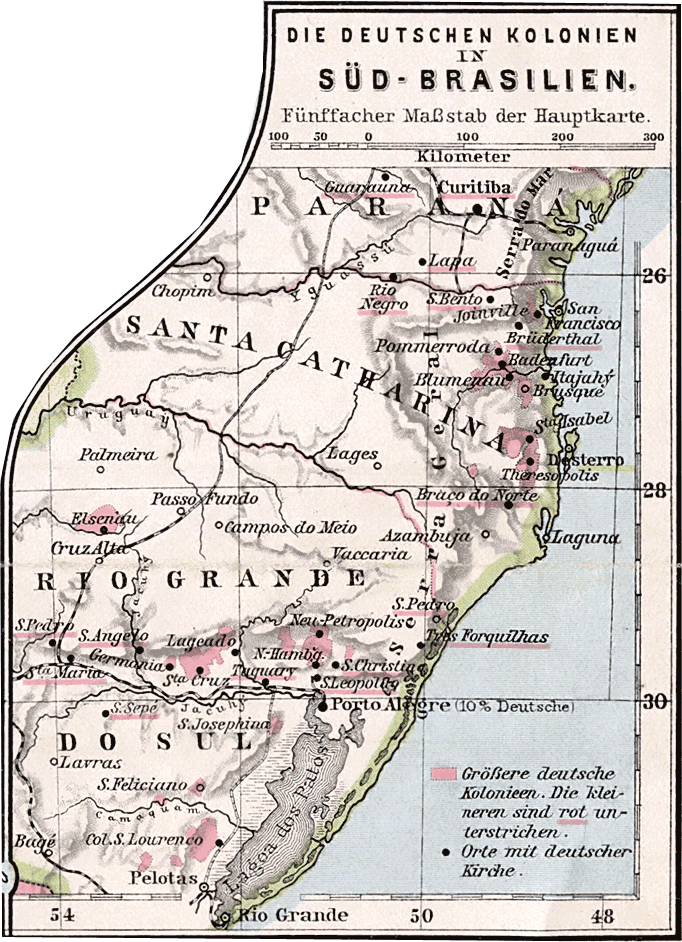
German colonies in Southern Brazil.

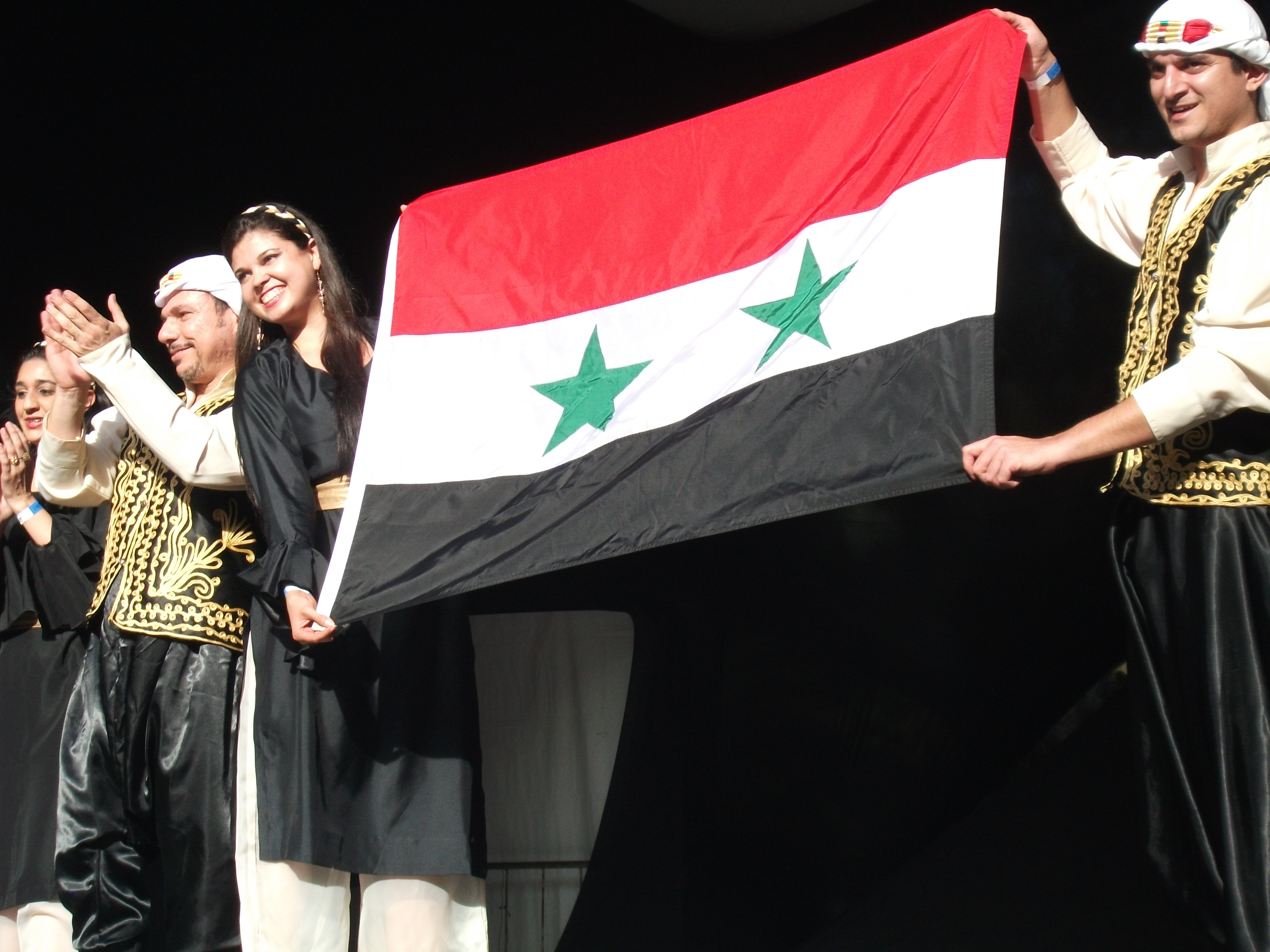
Syrian descendants in São Paulo.

American family in Americana.

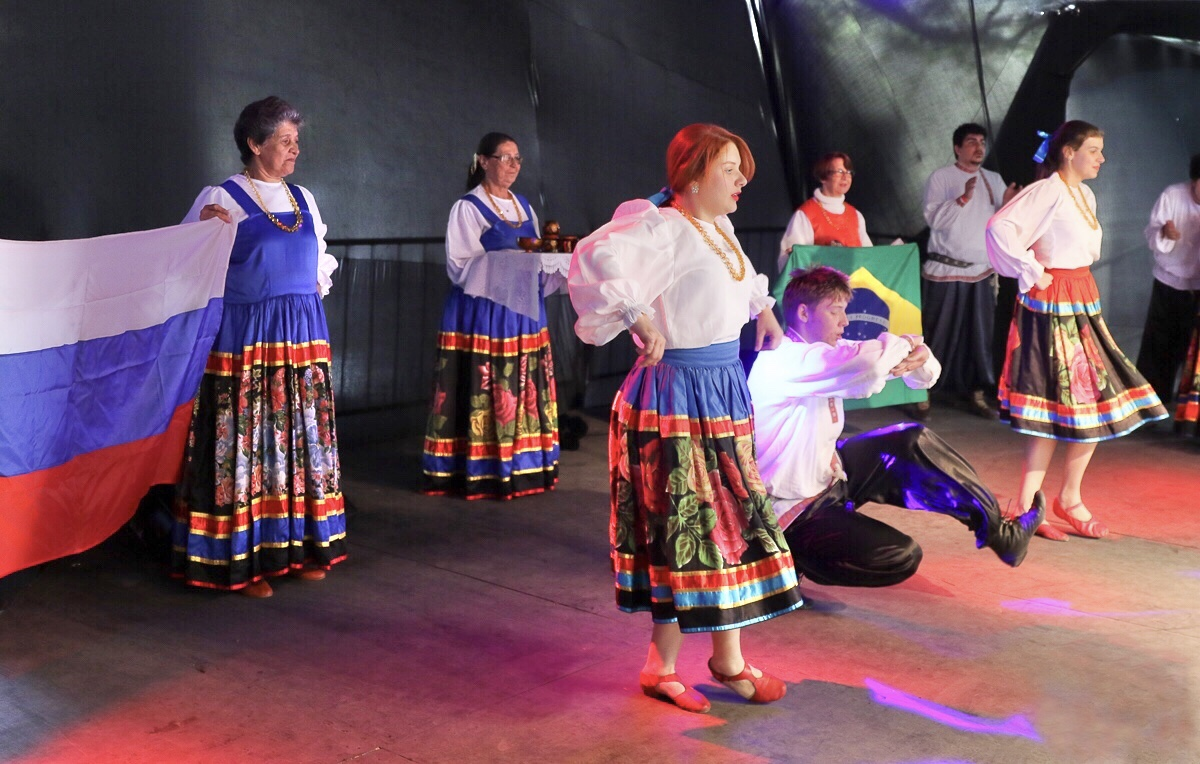
Russian descendants in São Paulo.

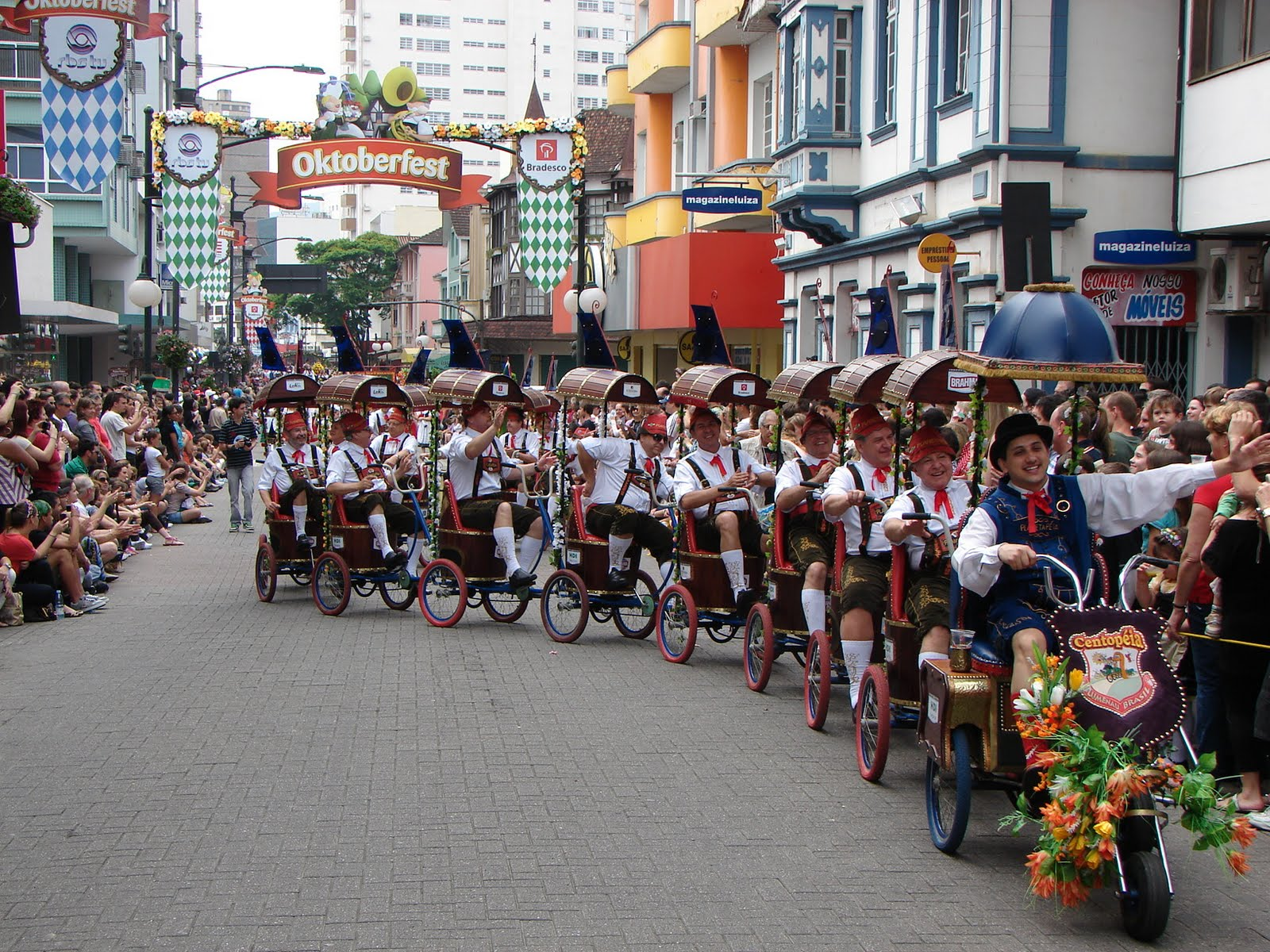
German community in Blumenau.

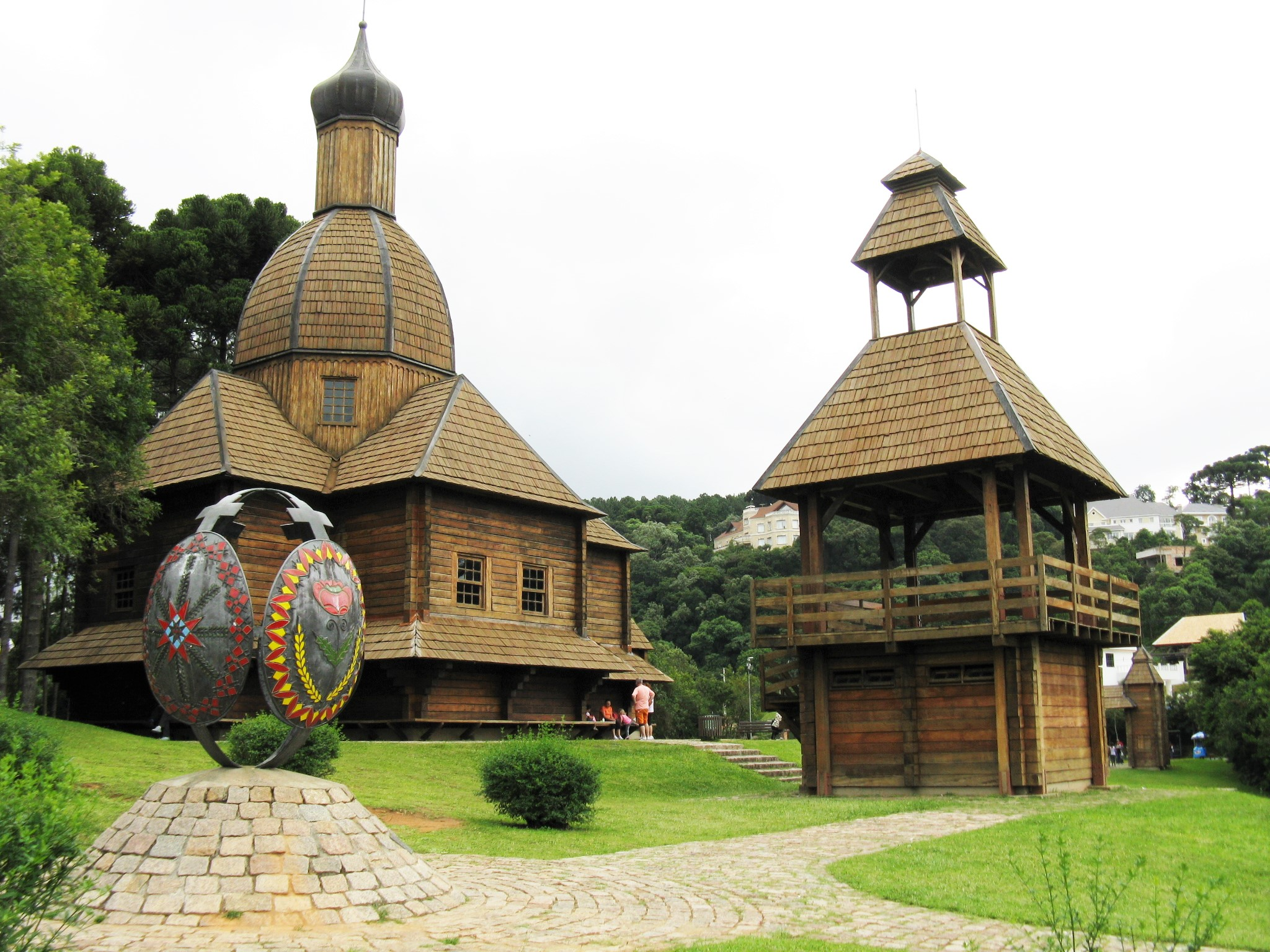
Ukrainian church in Curitiba.

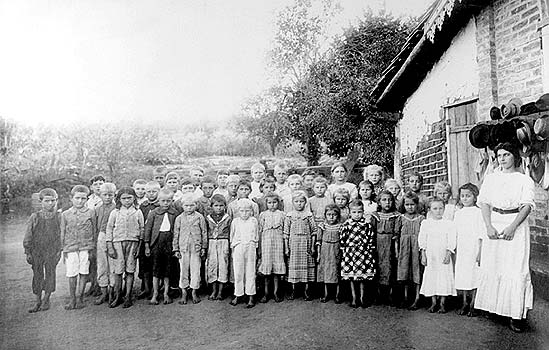
Italian students in Campinas.

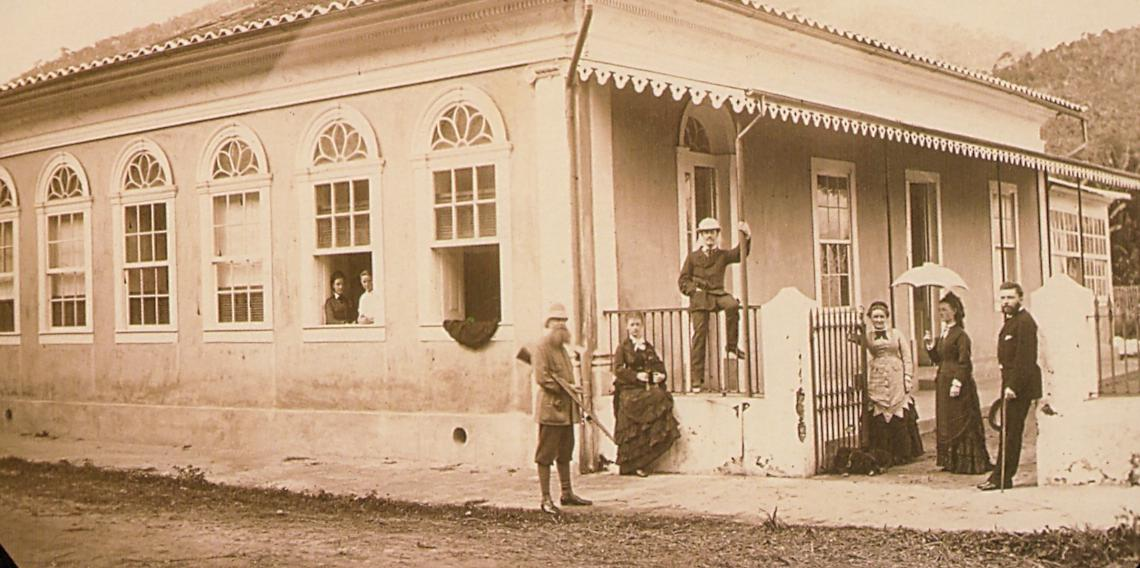
German Brazilians in 1874.

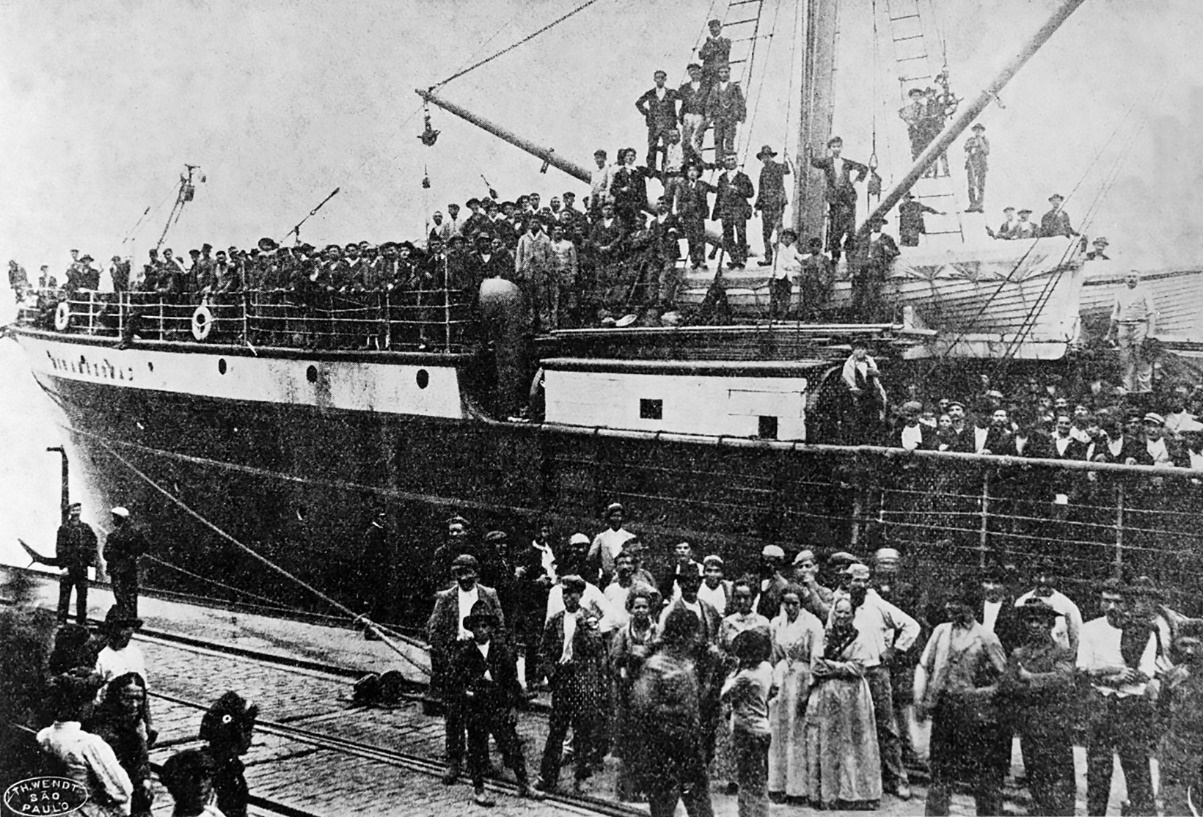
Italian disembarkment in Santos, São Paulo, 1907.

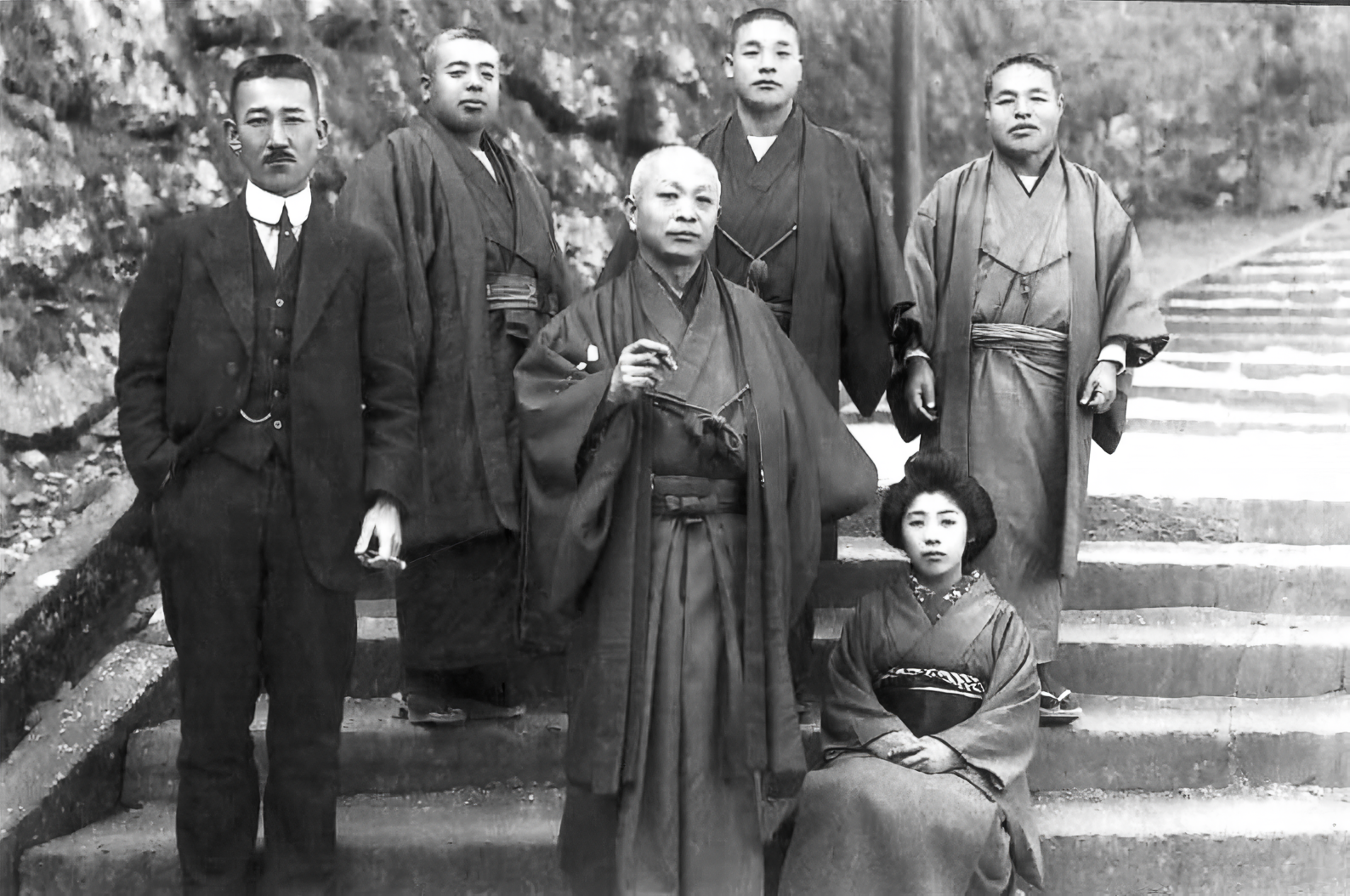
Ryo Mizuno (at center), who organized the first travel of Japanese immigrants to Brazil.

Brazilian demographers have long discussed the demographical impact of the wave of emigration in the late 19th and early 20th centuries. According to Judicael Clevelário, most studies about the impact of immigration have followed Giorgio Mortara's conclusions in the 1940s and 1950s. Mortara concluded that only about 15% of the demographic growth of Brazil, from 1840 and 1940 was due to immigration, and that the population of immigrant origin was of 16% of the total population of Brazil.

However, according to Clevelário, Mortara failed to properly take into account the full endogenous growth of the population of immigrant origin, due to the predominantly rural settlement of the immigrants (rural regions tend to have higher natal rates than cities). Clevelário, then, besides extending the calculations up to 1980, remade them, reaching somewhat different conclusions.

One of the problems of calculating the impact of immigration in Brazilian demography is that the return rates of immigrants are unknown. Clevelário, thence, supposed four different hypothesis concerning the return rates. The first, that he deems unrealistic high, is that 50% of the immigrants to Brazil returned to their countries of origin. The second is based on the work of Arthur Neiva, who supposes the return rate for Brazil was higher than that of the United States (30%) but lower than that of Argentina (47%). The third hypothesis is taken from Mortara, who postulates a rate of 20% for the 19th century, 35% for the first two decades of the 20th century, and 25% for 1920 on. Although Mortara himself considered this hypothesis underestimated, Clevelário thinks it is closest to reality. The last hypothesis, also admittedly unrealistic is that of a 0% rate of return, which is known to be false.

Clevelário's conclusions are as following: considering hypothesis 1 (unrealistically high), the Population of Immigrant Origin in 1980 would be of 14,730,710 people, or 12.38% of the total population. Considering hypothesis 2 (based on Neiva), it would be of 17,609,052 people, or 14.60% of the total population. Considering hypothesis 3 (based on Mortara, and considered most realistic), it would be of 22,088,829 people, or 18.56% of the total population. Considering hypothesis 4 (no return at all), the Population of Immigrant origin would be of 29,348,423 people, or 24.66% of the total population. Clevelário believes the most probable number to be close to 18%, higher than Mortara's previous estimate of 1947. According to the Census of 1872, there were 9,930,478 people in Brazil, of which 3,787,289 (38.14%) Whites, 3,380,172 (34.04%) Pardos, 1.954.452 (19.68%) Blacks, and 386,955 (3.90%) Caboclos. The White population grew faster than the non-White population due to the subsidized immigration of Europeans in the late 19th and early 20th centuries. By 1890, the non-White population was reduced to 47% and the Amerindian to 9%. During this period, most immigrants came from Italy (58.49%) followed by Portugal with 20%.

The disproportionally fast growth of the White population, due to mass immigration, lasted up to 1940, when its proportion in the Brazilian population peaked at 63.5%. During the 1900–1940 period, Italian immigration was greatly reduced, due to the Prinetti decree, forbidding subsidized emigration to Brazil in 1902, then to the Italian war effort of 1915–1918. Thence, for the period of 1904–1940, Portuguese immigration became the main drive of immigration to Brazil, with 36.52% of the arrivals, compared to 14.99% of Italians.

The Brazilian Censuses do not ask questions about "ethnic origin", so there are no systematically comparable data about the impact of immigration. Varied entities, mainly embassies of foreign countries in Brazil and commercial associations that promote bilateral commerce between Brazil and other countries, make claims about the figures of "descendants of immigrants" in Brazil, but none links to any actual survey. Also, if they are extrapolations of actual data on the number of immigrants, the calculations are not explained anywhere.

On the other hand, in 1998, the IBGE, within its preparation for the 2000 Census, experimentally introduced a question about "origem" (origin/ancestry) in its "Pesquisa Mensal de Emprego" (Monthly Employment Research), to test the viability of introducing that variable in the Census (the IBGE ended by deciding against the inclusion of questions about it in the Census). This research interviewed about 90,000 people in six metropolitan regions (São Paulo, Rio de Janeiro, Porto Alegre, Belo Horizonte, Salvador, and Recife). To this day, it remains the only actual published survey about the immigrant origin of Brazilians.

Here are its results:

Brazilian Population, by ancestry, 1998
Ancestry	%
(Brazil) "Brazilian"	86.09%
(Portugal) Portuguese	10.46%
(Italy) Italian	10.41%
Indigenous	6.64%
Black	5.09%
(Spain) Spanish	4.40%
(Germany) German	3.54%
African	2.06%
(Japan) Japanese	1.34%
(Lebanon) (Syria) Lebanese/Syrian	0.48%
(Israel) Jewish	0.20%
Others	2.81%
Total	133.52%

Notice that the total is higher than 100% because of multiple answers. It is easy to see that the results of this research are widely incompatible with the claims made by embassies and commercial associations:

Comparison between claims by embassies, commercial associations, etc., and actual data
Ancestry	Number of immigrants	Ancestry in Brazil (claims by embassies, etc.)	Found by 1998 PME (%)	Projection
(Germany) Germans	240,000	5,000,000	3.54%	6,372,000
(Italy) Italians	1,622,491	25,000,000	10.41%	18,738,000
(Spain) Spaniards	716,052	15,000,000	4.40%	7,920,000
(Lebanon) (Syria) Lebanese/Syrians	100,000	10,000,000	0.48%	864,000
(Japan) Japanese	248,007	1,600,000	1.34%	2,412,000

The embassy figures are also hardly compatible with the known data for immigration. Here is how they compare:

Number of immigrants and their purported descendants, by national origin
Origin	Immigrants	Descendants	Descendants per immigrant
(Germany) German	223,658	5,000,000	22.36
(Lebanon) (Syria) Lebanese/Syrian	140,000	10,000,000	71.43
(Spain) Spanish	716,478	15,000,000	20.94
(Italy) Italian	1,623,931	25,000,000	15.39
(Japan) Japanese	248,007	1,400,000	5.65

The embassy figures for "Arab Brazilians" imply an impossible rate of childbirth. The process of inflation of the "Arab Brazilian" population is described by John Tofik Karam: Maintaining a privileged presence in business and political circles, Middle Easterners have overestimated themselves as a way to strengthen their place in the Brazilian nation.

Among the groups listed in the table, German immigrants arrived quite early in Brazil, starting in the 1820s. By 1883, 23.86% of them had already arrived. Italian immigrants only started to arrive in the 1870s, coming in enormous numbers until 1902, when Italian immigration declined sharply. By 1903, 70.33% of them had already arrived. Spaniards started arriving about the same time as the Italians, but came in more steady pace, which means that, in average, they represent a more recent immigration. Arabs only started to arrive in considerable numbers about 1890, making them the second most recent immigration, after the Japanese, who started to arrive in 1908. Evidently, the older the immigration, higher should be the descendant/immigrant relation—but, as the table shows, the embassy figures would place the Arab descendant/immigrant relation first—and, in fact, more than three times higher than that of the Germans.

When the number of immigrants is compared to the findings of the July 1998 PME, the results are different:

Number of immigrants and their descendants, projected from the 1998 PME, by national origin
Origin	Immigrants	Descendants	Descendants per immigrant
(Germany) German	223,658	4,709,857	21.06
(Lebanon) (Syria) Lebanese/Syrian	140,000	641,200	4.58
(Spain) Spanish	716,478	5,856,417	8.17
(Italy) Italian	1,623,931	13,847,471	8.53
(Japan) Japanese	248,007	1,776,382	7.16

Here the correct order is reestablished, except for the Arabs appearing with a lower descendant/immigrant rate than the Japanese. This, however, is probably due to the concentration of Nikkeis in São Paulo, as opposed to a less concentrated distribution of "Arab Brazilians", who are present in considerable numbers in regions not counted by the PMEs—notably the Northern Region, the West of Paraná State, and Southern Rio Grande do Sul.

Nowadays, it's possible to find millions of descendants of Italians, from the southeastern state of Minas Gerais to the southernmost state of Rio Grande do Sul, with the majority living in the state of São Paulo (15.9 million) and the highest percentage in the southeastern state of Espírito Santo (60–75%). Small southern Brazilian towns, such as Nova Veneza, have as much as 95% of their population of Italian descent.

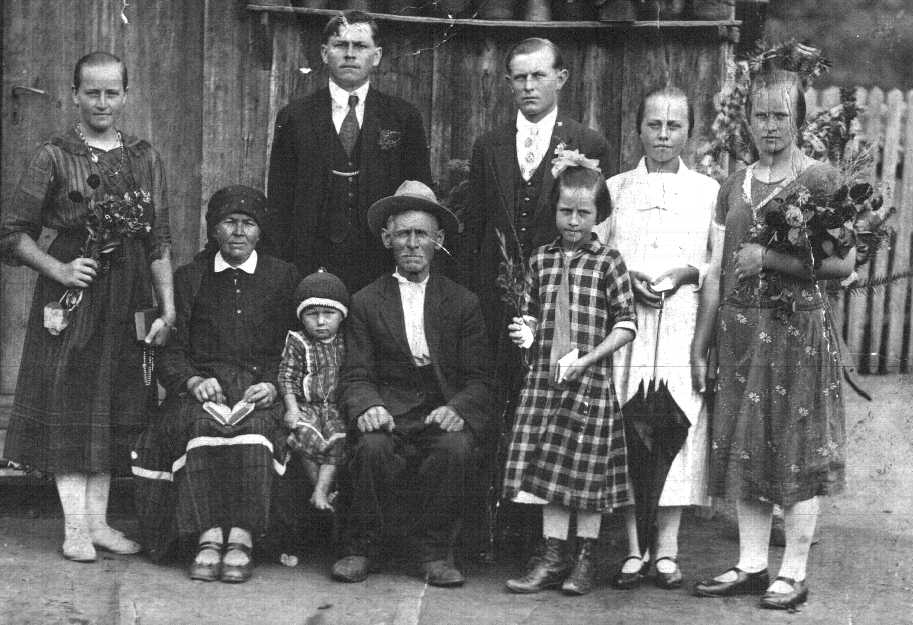
Ukrainians in Brazil.

As happened with several other countries in the Americas, such as the United States, which received immigration from many countries, Brazil quickly became a melting pot of races and nationalities, but being peculiar in the sense of having the highest degree of intermarriage in the world.

Thousands of White Americans from the Southern United States (including relatives of former president Jimmy Carter), known as Confederados, fled to Brazil after the American Civil War, where they settled in the city of Santa Bárbara d'Oeste and founded a city nearby, Americana.

=== Opposition to immigration ===
Brazil is a country of immigrants and developed a reputation for "warm welcome" of people all over the world. Nevertheless, different analysts often dispute how truthful this image is and, although openly xenophobic manifestation were uncommon, some scholars denounce it existence in more subtle ways.

Despite the fact that Brazil was considered a safe haven for neighboring refugees and immigrants, xenophobic violence has erupted. Brazil received up to 3000 Syrian refugees becoming the largest receiver of such in Latin America. However, xenophobic and islamophobic attacks were reported against Syrian refugees and Muslims in general. After the alleged beating of a shop owner during a robbery by alleged Venezuelan migrants, riots occurred in the Brazilian-Venezuelan border which included attacks on Venezuelans nationals, destruction of refugee tents and fires. 1200 Venezuelans went back to their homeland as a result and the administration of President Michel Temer increased military personnel in the border. The burning of the refugee camps was reported in national and international news outlet and the authorities announce they will investigate and prosecute the authors.

During the Brazilian general election in 2018, then far-right presidential candidate Jair Bolsonaro said the government should not turn its back on popular sentiment in Roraima, and proposed the creation of refugee camps with the help of the United Nations. Once he became president, Bolsonaro said he would adopt more rigorous criteria for the entry of foreigners to Brazil, but ruled that he would not repatriate Venezuelan immigrants to their country.

== Co-official languages in Brazil ==
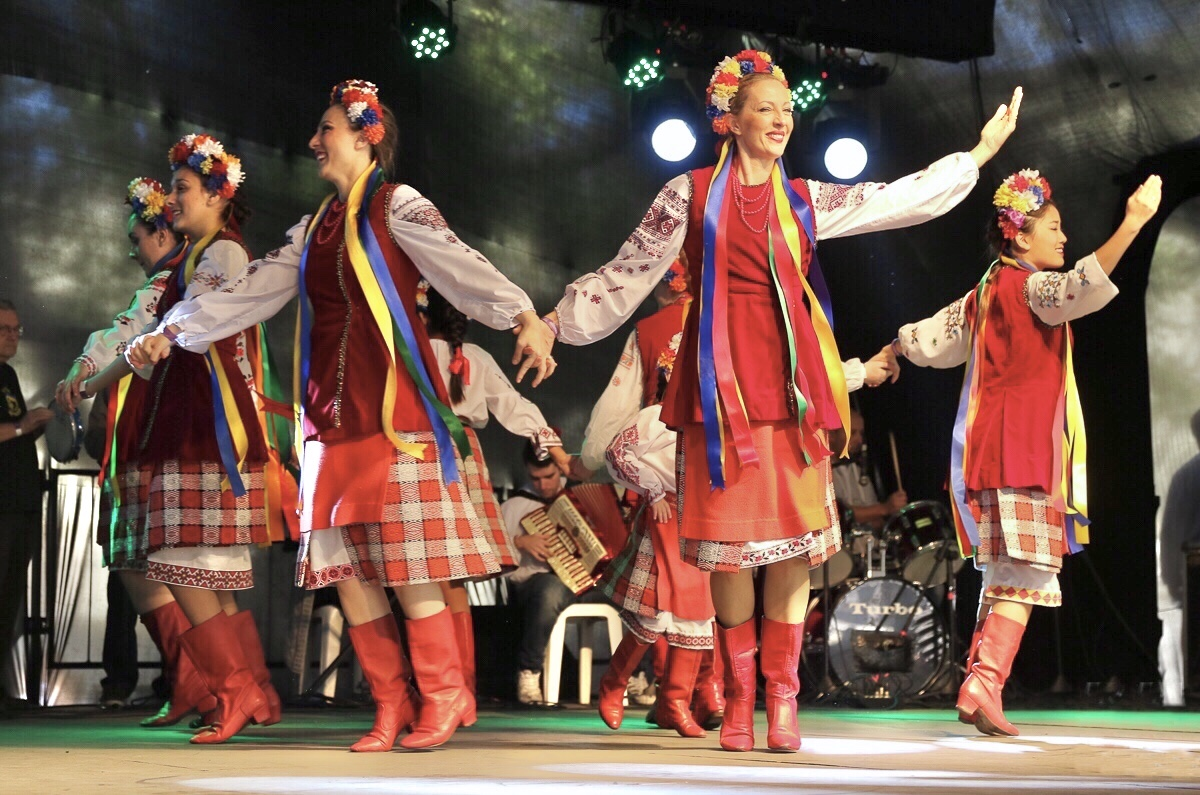
Festa do Imigrante in São Paulo.

German children in Blumenau, 1866.

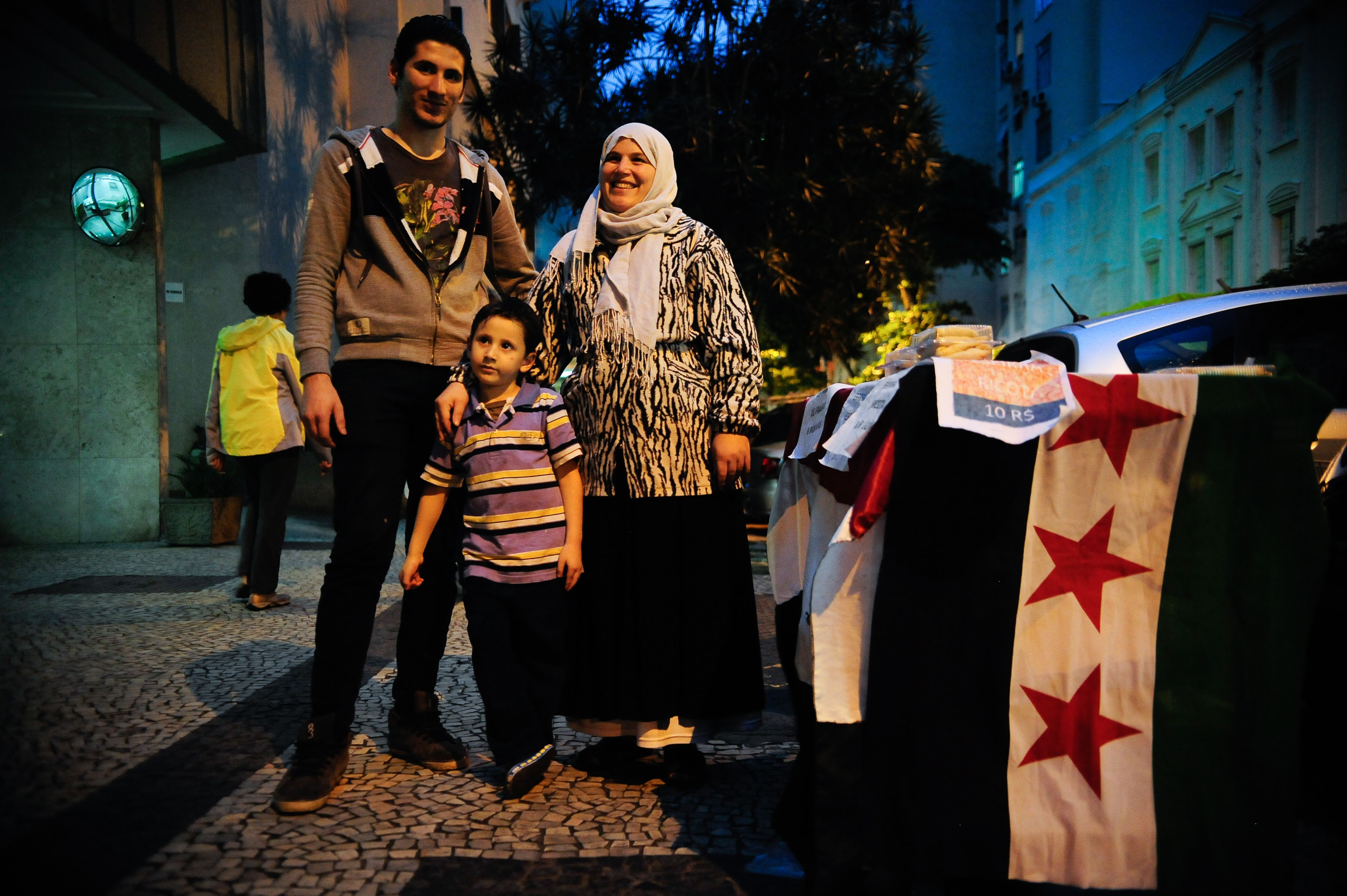
Syrian refugees in Rio de Janeiro.

Municipalities where the Pomeranian language is co-official in Espírito Santo.

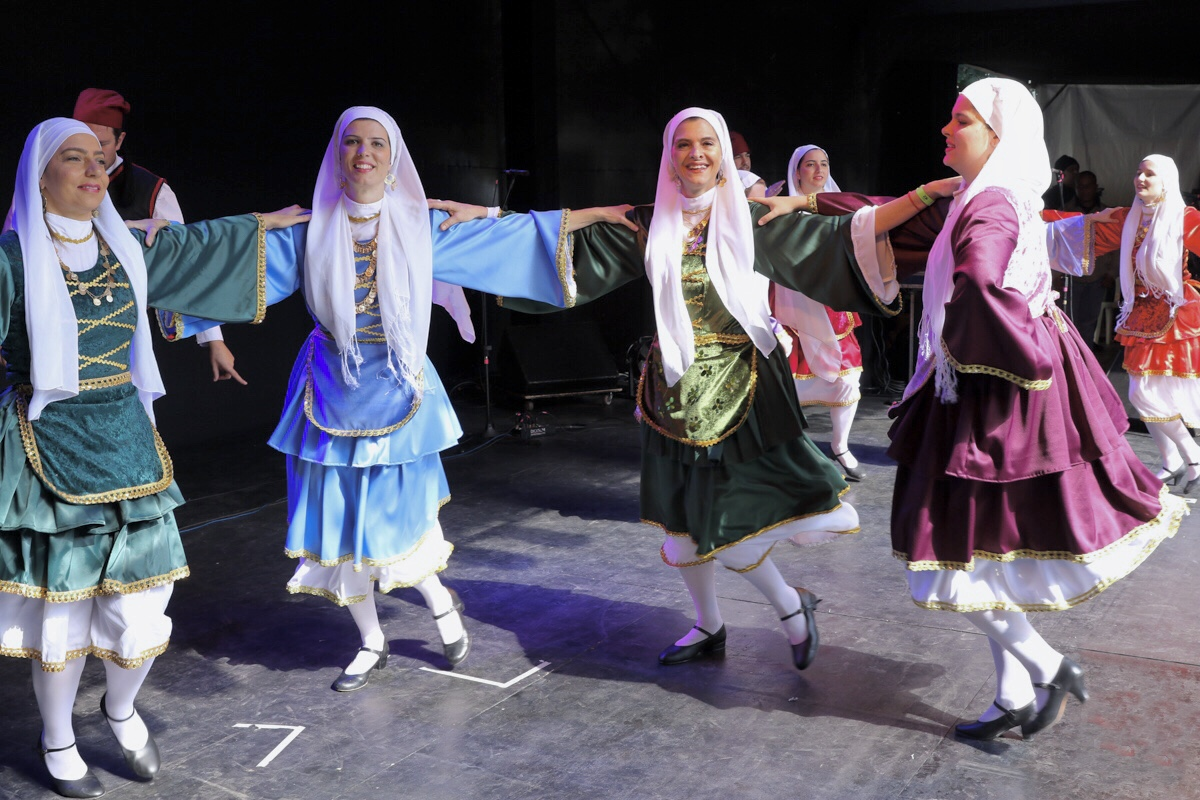
European immigrants in Brazil.

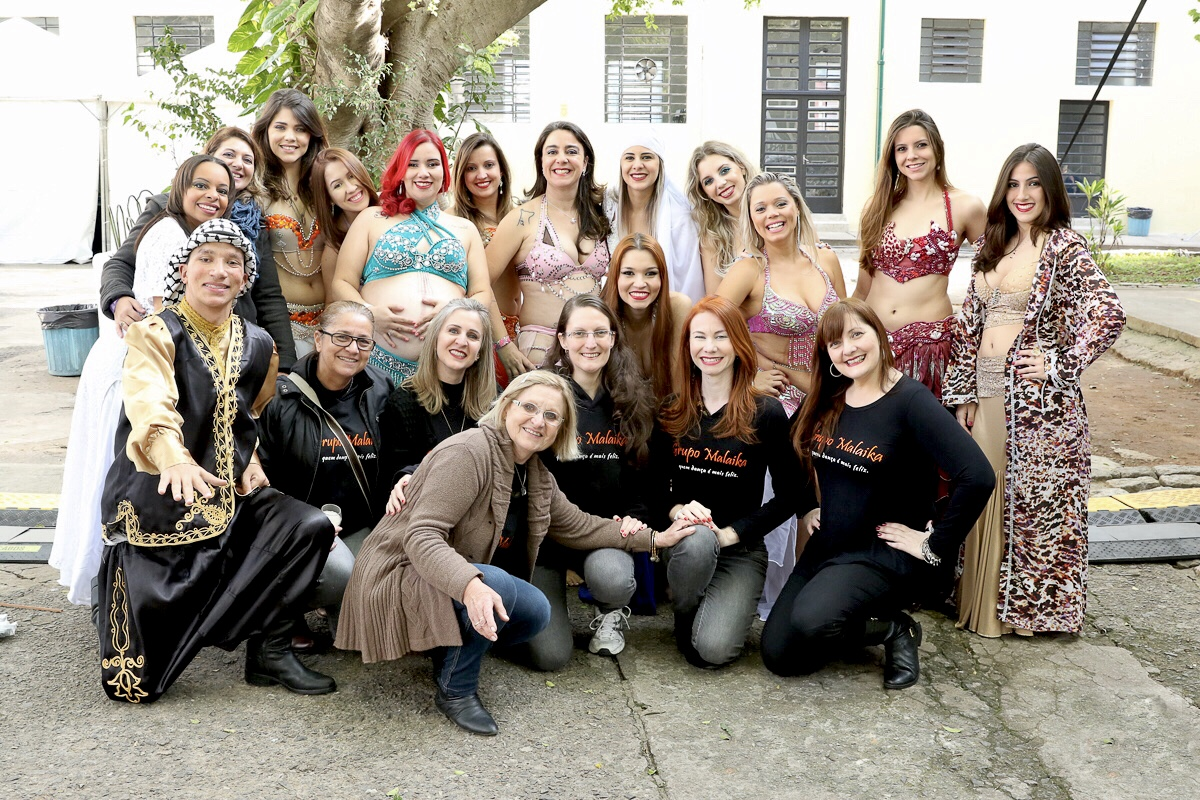
Arab immigrants in São Paulo.

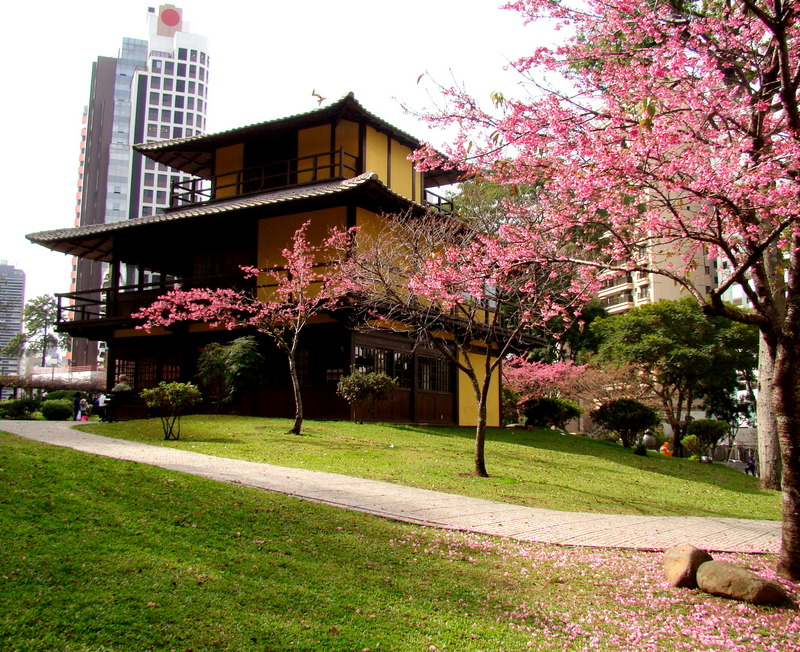
Japan Square in Curitiba.

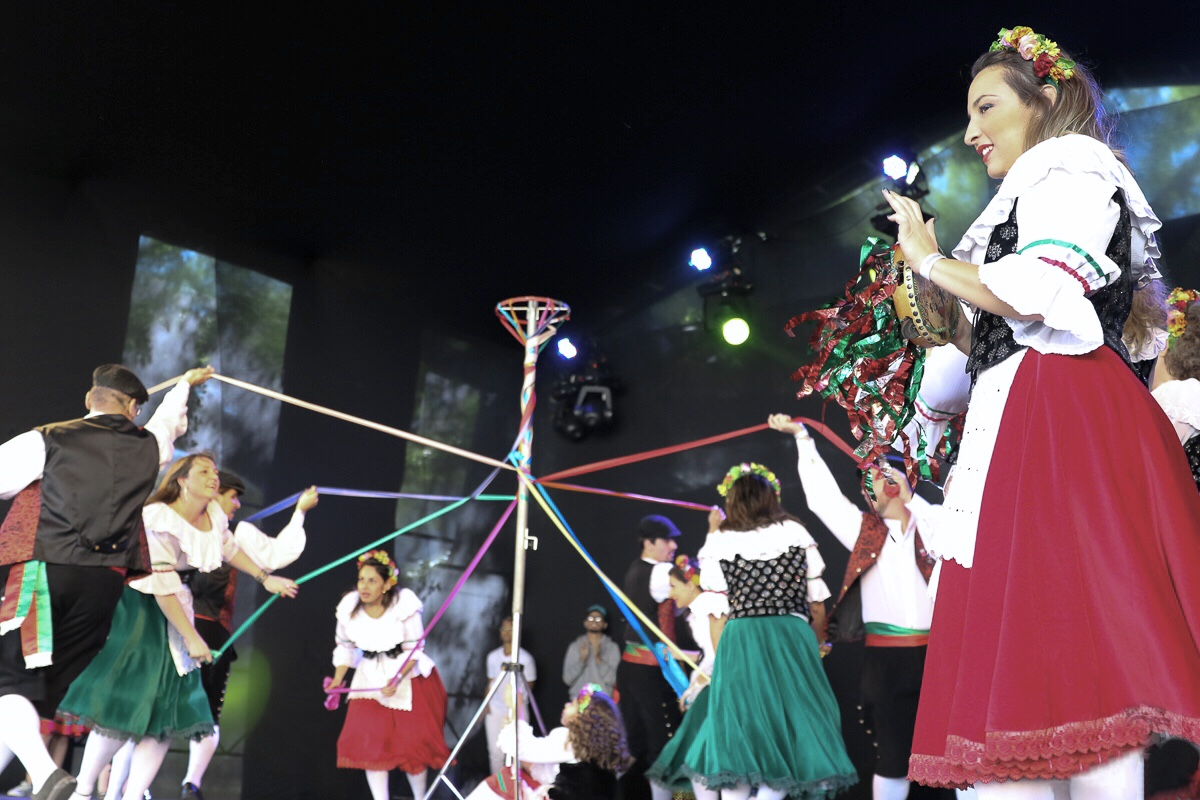
Hungarian immigrants in Brazil.

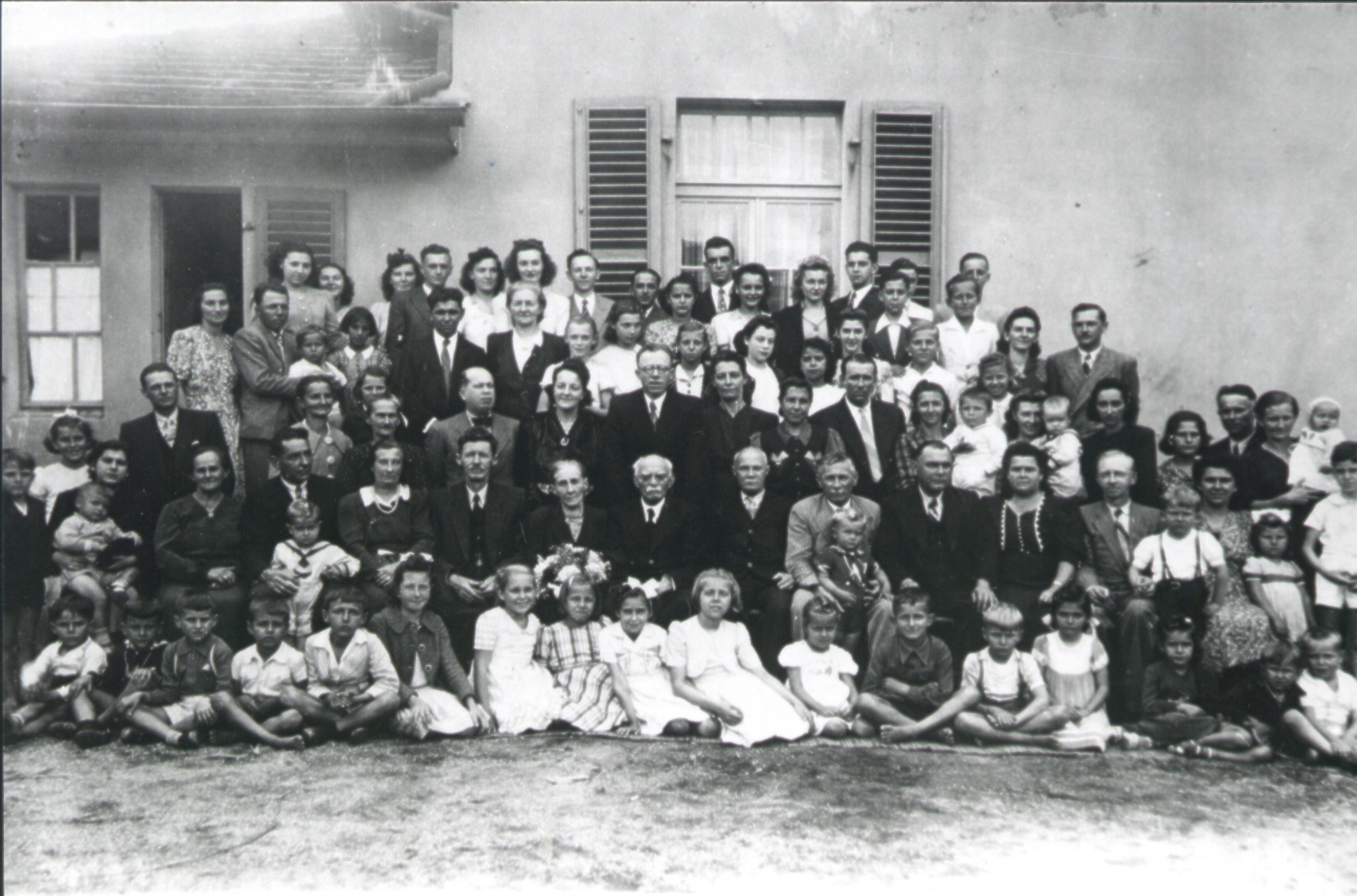
Italian family in Brusque.

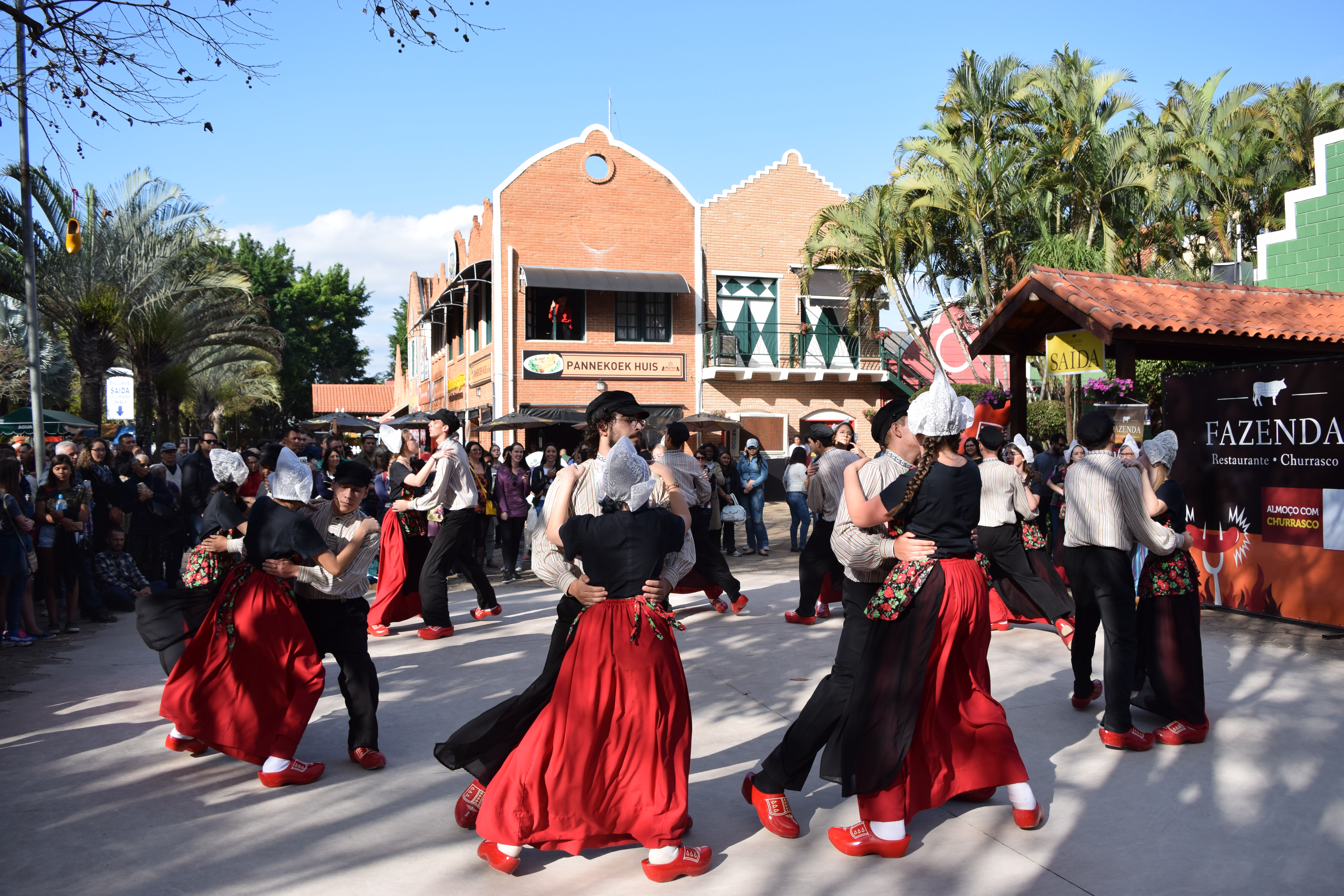
Dutch descendants in Holambra.

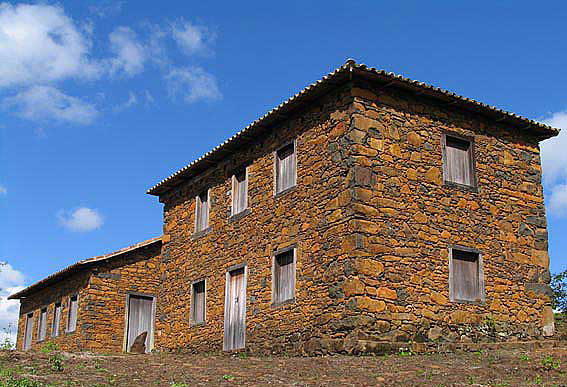
Italian houses in Nova Veneza.

In this century has grown a recent trend of co-official languages in cities populated by immigrants (such as Italian and German) or indigenous in the north, both with support from the Ministry of Tourism, as was recently established in Santa Maria de Jetibá, Pomerode and Vila Pavão, where German also has co-official status.

The first municipality to adopt a co-official language in Brazil was São Gabriel da Cachoeira, in 2002. Since then, other municipalities attempt to co-officialise other languages.

The states of Santa Catarina and Rio Grande do Sul have Talian officially approved as a heritage language in these states, and Espírito Santo has the East Pomeranian dialect, along with the German language, such as cultural heritage state.

=== Brazilian states with linguistic heritages officially approved statewide ===
- (Brazil) (Germany) Espírito Santo (Pomeranian and German)

- (Brazil) (Italy) (Germany) Rio Grande do Sul (Talian and Riograndenser Hunsrückisch German)
- (Brazil) (Italy) Santa Catarina (Talian)

=== Municipalities that have co-official indigenous languages ===
==== Amazonas ====
- (Brazil) São Gabriel da Cachoeira (Nheengatu, Tukano and Baniwa)

==== Mato Grosso do Sul ====
- (Brazil) Tacuru (Guarani)
- (Brazil) Paranhos (Guarani, under approval)

==== Roraima ====
- (Brazil) Bonfim (macushi) and (wapishana)

==== Tocantins ====
- (Brazil) Tocantínia (Akwê Xerente)

=== Municipalities that have co-official allochthonous languages ===
==== Municipalities that have co-official Talian language (or Venetian dialect) ====
===== Rio Grande do Sul =====
- (Brazil) (Italy) Serafina Corrêa
- (Brazil) (Italy) Flores da Cunha
- (Brazil) (Italy) Nova Roma do Sul
- (Brazil) (Italy) Paraí
- (Brazil) (Italy) Bento Gonçalves
- (Brazil) (Italy) Fagundes Varela
- (Brazil) (Italy) Antônio Prado
- (Brazil) (Italy) Guabiju
- (Brazil) (Italy) Camargo
- (Brazil) (Italy) Caxias do Sul
- (Brazil) (Italy) Ivorá
- (Brazil) (Italy) Pinto Bandeira
- (Brazil) (Italy) Nova Pádua
- (Brazil) (Italy) Barão

===== Santa Catarina =====
- (Brazil) (Italy) Nova Erechim
- (Brazil) (Italy) Ipumirim

==== Municipalities that have co-official East Pomeranian language ====
===== Espírito Santo =====
- (Brazil) (Germany) Domingos Martins
- (Brazil) (Germany) Itarana
- (Brazil) (Germany) Laranja da Terra
- (Brazil) (Germany) Pancas
- (Brazil) (Germany) Santa Maria de Jetibá
- (Brazil) (Germany) Vila Pavão

===== Minas Gerais =====
- (Brazil) (Germany) Itueta (only in the district of Vila Nietzel)

===== Santa Catarina =====
- (Brazil) (Germany) Pomerode

===== Rio Grande do Sul =====
- (Brazil) (Germany) Canguçu (under approval)

===== Rondônia =====
- (Brazil) (Germany) Espigão d'Oeste (under approval)

==== Municipalities that have co-official Trentinian language (or Trentinian dialect) ====
===== Santa Catarina =====
- (Brazil) (Italy) Rodeio

==== Municipalities that have co-official language Riograndenser Hunsrückisch language ====
===== Santa Catarina =====
- (Brazil) (Germany) Antônio Carlos
- (Brazil) (Germany) Treze Tílias (language teaching is compulsory in schools, standing on stage in public official of the municipality)
- (Brazil) (Germany) Ipumirim

===== Rio Grande do Sul =====
- (Brazil) (Germany) Santa Maria do Herval
- (Brazil) (Germany) Barão

==== Municipalities in which the teaching of the German language is mandatory ====
===== Rio Grande do Sul =====
- (Brazil) (Germany) Nova Petrópolis

==== Municipalities in which the teaching of the Italian language is mandatory ====
===== Espírito Santo =====
- (Brazil) (Italy) Venda Nova do Imigrante

===== Paraná =====
- (Brazil) (Italy) Francisco Beltrão

===== Rio Grande do Sul =====
- (Brazil) (Italy) Antônio Prado

===== Santa Catarina =====
- (Brazil) (Italy) Brusque
- (Brazil) (Italy) Criciúma

==== Municipalities that have co-official Plattdüütsch language (or Plattdüütsch dialect) ====
===== Rio Grande do Sul =====
- (Brazil) (Germany) Westfália

==== Municipalities that have co-official German language ====
===== Santa Catarina =====
- (Brazil) (Germany) Pomerode
- (Brazil) (Germany) São João do Oeste

== See also ==
- Afro-Brazilians
- Americans in Brazil
- Argentine Brazilians
- Armenian Brazilians
- Bolivians in Brazil
- Brazilian diaspora
- Bulgarians in South America
- Croatian Brazilians
- Chinese Brazilians
- Cuban immigration to Brazil
- Czech Brazilians
- Dutch Brazilians
- English Brazilians
- French Brazilians
- Greek Brazilians
- Haitian Brazilian
- History of the Jews in Brazil
- Hungarian Brazilians
- Japanese Brazilians
- Korean Brazilians
- Lithuanians in Brazil
- Luxembourg Brazilians
- Palestinian Brazilians
- Polish Brazilians
- Russians in Brazil
- Scandinavian Brazilians
- Spanish immigration to Brazil
- Swiss Brazilians
- Turkish Brazilians
- Uruguayan Brazilians
- Ukrainian Brazilians
- Venezuelan Brazilians
