= Languages of Brazil =

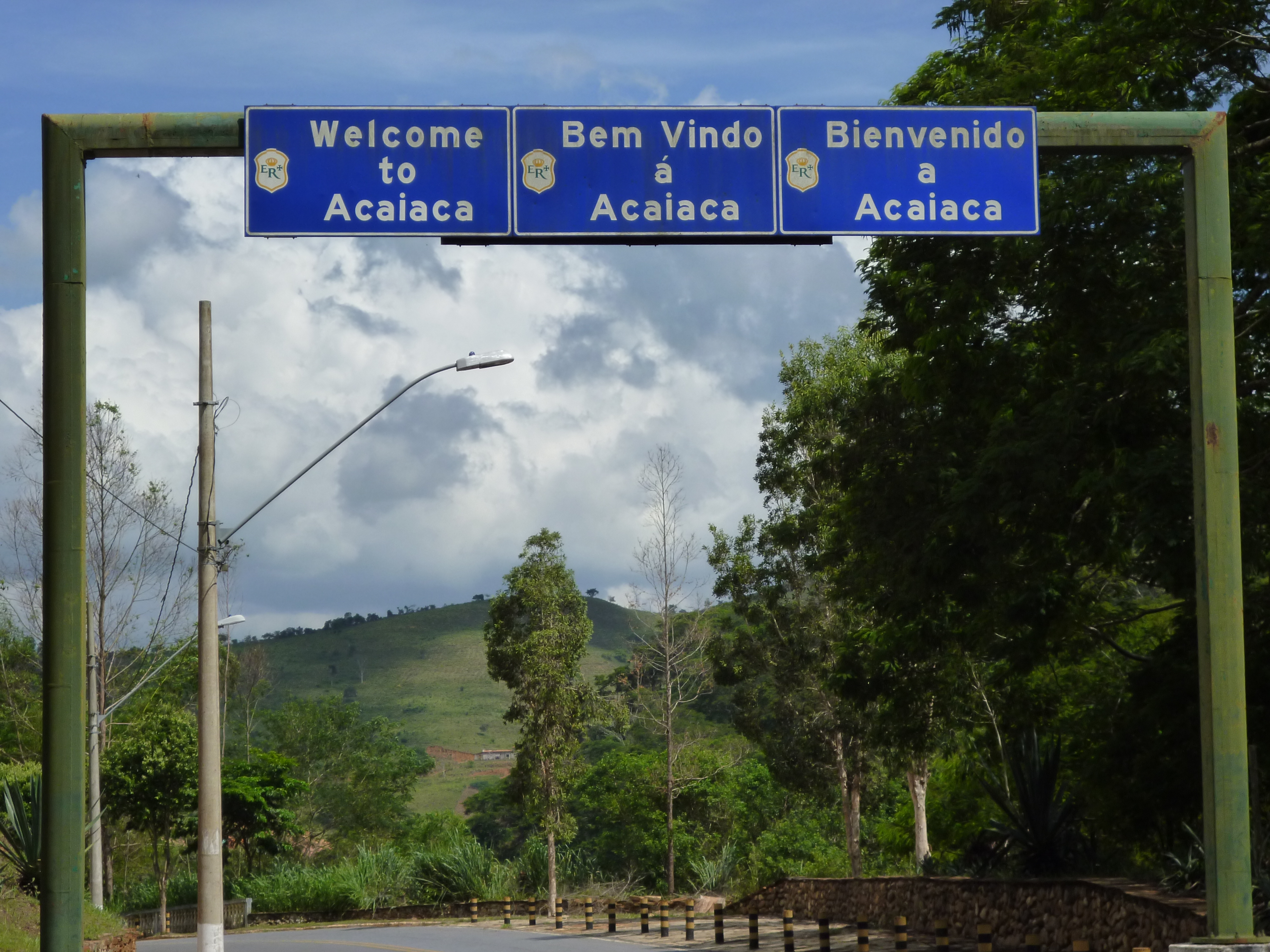
- English, Portuguese and Spanish welcome signs in Acaiaca
- Official: Portuguese - 99.5%
- Main: Portuguese
- Indigenous: Apalaí, Arára, Bororo, Canela, Carajá, Carib, Guarani, Kaingang, Nadëb, Nheengatu, Pirahã, Terena, Ticuna, Tucano, Wanano, Ye'kuana
- Regional: German, Venetian, Japanese, Spanish (border areas), Polish, Ukrainian, East Pomeranian, Romani
- Vernacular: Brazilian Portuguese
- Immigrant: German, Venetian, Neapolitan, Levantine Arabic, Polish, Ukrainian, Russian, Japanese, Spanish, English, Chinese, Hebrew
- Foreign: English, Japanese, Dutch, German, Italian
- Signed: Brazilian Sign Language; Ka'apor Sign Language; Terena Sign Language
- Keyboard layout: Portuguese keyboard layout

Portuguese is the official and national language of Brazil, being widely spoken by nearly all of its population. Brazil is the most populous Portuguese-speaking country in the world, with its lands comprising the majority of Portugal's former colonial holdings in the Americas.

Aside from Portuguese, the country also has numerous minority languages, including over 200 different indigenous languages, such as Nheengatu (a descendant of Tupi), and languages of more recent European and Asian immigrants, such as Italian, German and Japanese. In some municipalities, those minor languages have official status: Nheengatu, for example, is an official language in São Gabriel da Cachoeira, while a number of German dialects are official in nine southern municipalities.

Hunsrik (also known as Riograndenser Hunsrückisch) is a Germanic language, which derived from the Hunsrückisch dialect. Hunsrik has official status in Antônio Carlos and Santa Maria do Herval, and is recognized by the states of Rio Grande do Sul and Santa Catarina as part of their historical and cultural heritage.

As of 2023, the population of Brazil speaks or signs 238 languages, of which approximately 217 are indigenous and others are non-indigenous. In 2005, no indigenous language was spoken by more than 40,000 people.

With the implementation of the Orthographic Agreement of 1990, the orthographic norms of Brazil and Portugal have been largely unified, but still have some minor differences. Brazil enacted these changes in 2009 and Portugal enacted them in 2012.

In 2002, the Brazilian Sign Language (Libras) was made the official language of the Brazilian deaf community.

On December 9, 2010, the National Inventory of Linguistic Diversity was created, which will analyze proposals for revitalizing minority languages in the country. In 2019, the Technical Commission of the National Inventory of Linguistic Diversity was established.

== Overview ==
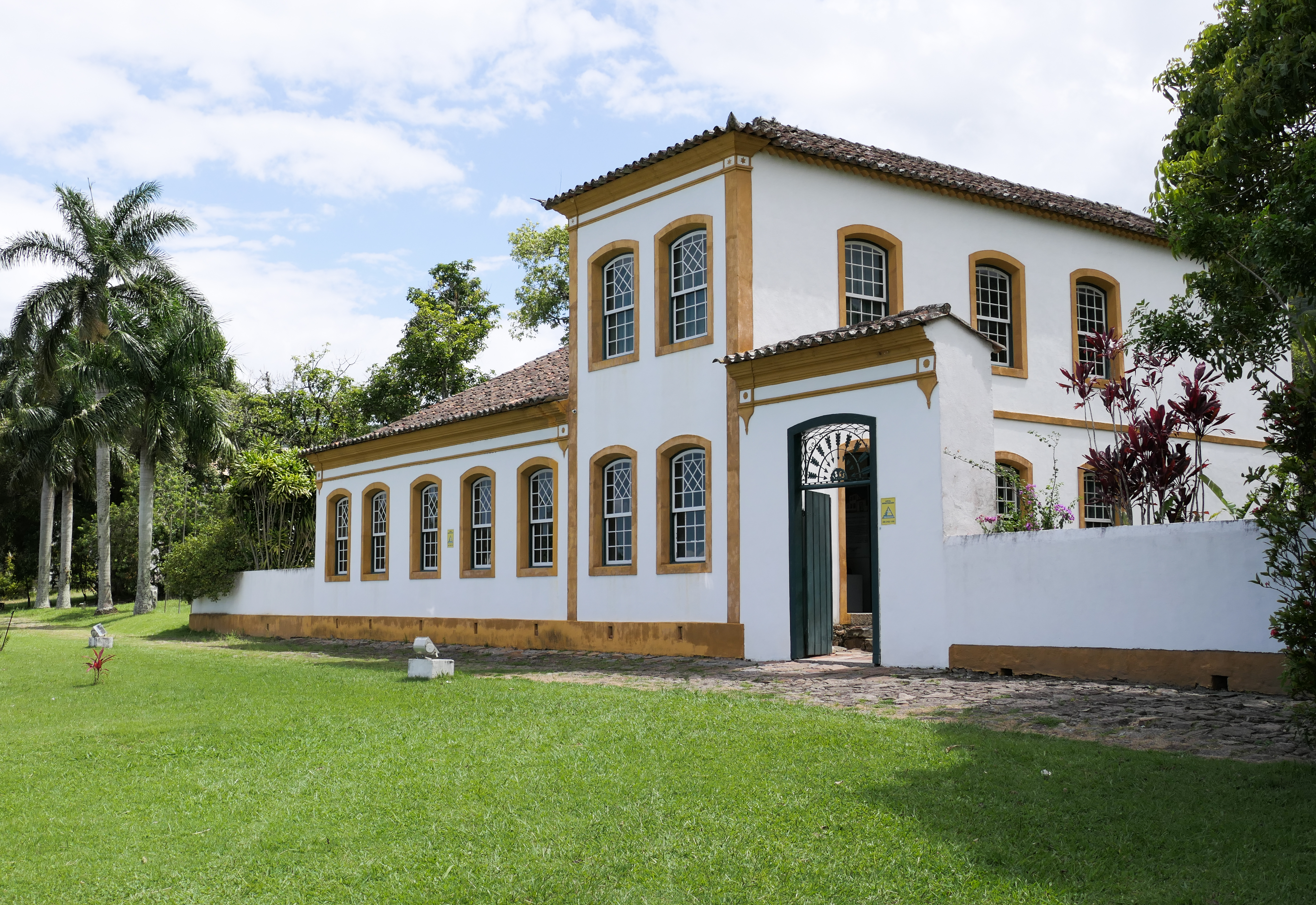
Colonial Portuguese house in the Brazilian city of Florianópolis.

Before the first Portuguese explorers arrived in 1500, what is now Brazil was inhabited by several Amerindian peoples that spoke many different languages. According to Aryon Dall'Igna Rodrigues there were six million Indians in Brazil speaking over 1,000 different languages. When the Portuguese settlers arrived, they encountered the Tupi people, who dominated most of the Brazilian coast and spoke a set of closely related languages.

The Tupi called the non-Tupi peoples "Tapuias", a designation that the Portuguese adopted; however, there was little unity among the diverse Tapuia tribes other than their not being Tupi. In the first two centuries of colonization, a language based on Tupian languages known as Língua Geral ("General Language") was widely spoken in the colony, not only by the Amerindians, but also by the Portuguese settlers, the Africans and their descendants.

This language was spoken across a vast territory stretching from São Paulo to Maranhão as an informal tongue for domestic use, while Portuguese remained the language for public and official purposes. Língua Geral was spread by Jesuit missionaries and Bandeirantes into other regions of Brazil where Tupi was not originally spoken. In 1758 (and reinforced in 1775), the Marquis of Pombal prohibited the use of Língua Geral or any other indigenous language in favour of Portuguese to consolidate colonial control.

However, before that prohibition, the Portuguese language was dominant in Brazil. Most of the other Amerindian languages gradually disappeared as the populations that spoke them were integrated or decimated when the Portuguese-speaking population expanded to most of Brazil. The several African languages spoken in Brazil also disappeared. Since the 20th century there are no more records of speakers of African languages in the country. However, in some isolated communities settled by escaped slaves (Quilombo), the Portuguese language spoken by its inhabitants still preserves some lexicon of African origin, which is not understood by other Brazilians.

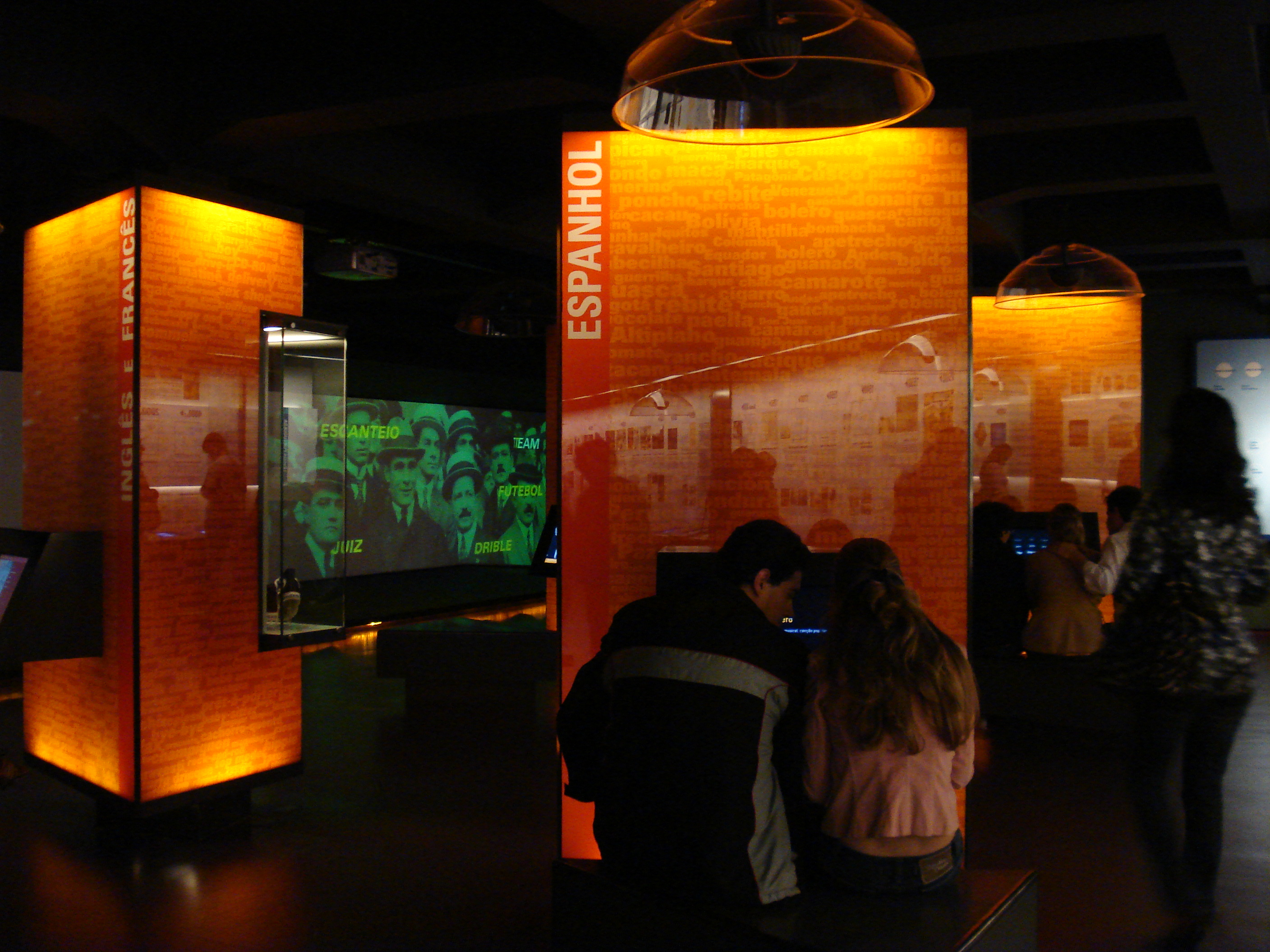
Inside the Museum of the Portuguese Language in São Paulo.

Due to the contact with several European, Amerindian and African languages, the Portuguese spoken in Brazil absorbed many influences from these languages, which led to a notable differentiation from the Portuguese spoken in Portugal. Examples of widely used words of Tupi origin in Brazilian Portuguese include abacaxi ("pineapple"), pipoca ("popcorn"), catapora ("chickenpox"), and siri ("crab"). The names of thirteen of Brazil's twenty six states also have Amerindian origin.

Starting in the early 19th century, Brazil started to receive substantial immigration of non-Portuguese-speaking people from Europe and Asia. Most immigrants, particularly Italians and Spaniards, adopted the Portuguese language after a few generations. Other immigrants, particularly Germans, Japanese, Poles and Ukrainians, preserved their languages for more generations. German-speaking immigrants started arriving in 1824. They came not only from Germany, but also from other countries that had a substantial German-speaking population (Switzerland, Poland, Austria, Romania and Russia (Volga Germans).

During over 100 years of continuous emigration, it is estimated that some 300,000 German-speaking immigrants settled in Brazil. Italian immigration started in 1875 and about 1.5 million Italians immigrated to Brazil until World War II. They spoke several dialects from Italy. Other sources of immigration to Brazil included Spaniards, Poles, Ukrainians, Japanese and Middle-easterns. With the notable exception of the Germans, who preserved their language for several generations, and in some degree the Japanese, Poles, Ukrainians, Arabs, Kurds and Italians, most of the immigrants in Brazil adopted Portuguese as their mother tongue after a few generations.

== Brazilian Portuguese ==
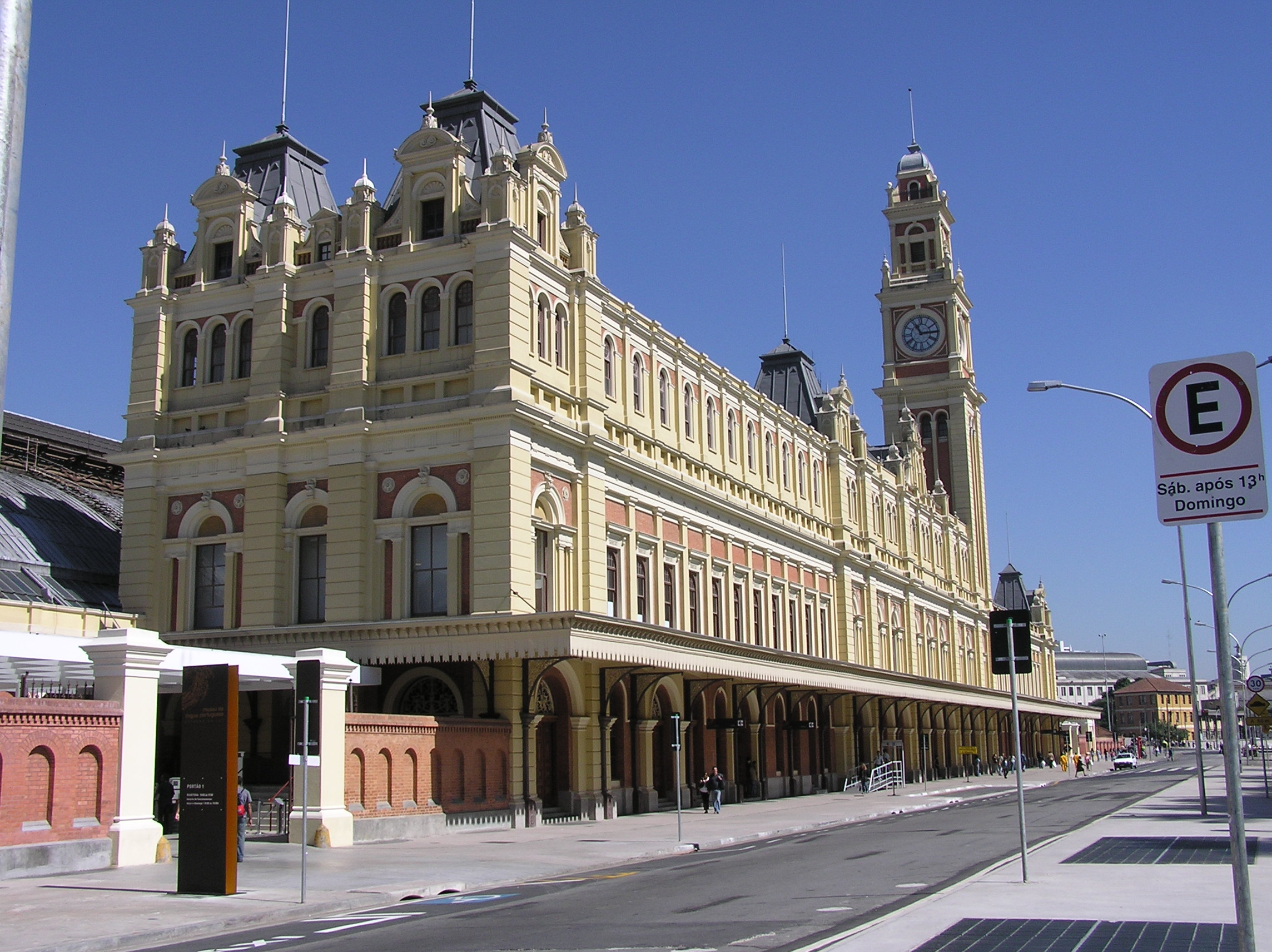
The Museum of the Portuguese Language in the city of São Paulo.

Brazilian Portuguese is the official language of Brazil and the primary language used in most schools and media. It is also used for all business and administrative purposes. Brazilian Portuguese has had its own development, influenced by the other European languages such as Italian and German in the South and Southeast, and several indigenous languages all across the country.

For this reason, Brazilian Portuguese differs noticeably from European Portuguese and other dialects of Portuguese-speaking countries, even though they are all mutually intelligible. Such differences occur in phonetics and lexicon and have been compared to the differences between British English and American English.

== Brazilian Sign Language ==
The Brazilian Sign Language (Libras) is the sign language used by deaf people in Brazilian urban centers and legally recognized as a means of communication and expression. It is derived both from an autochthonous sign language, which is native to the region or territory in which it lives, and from French sign language; therefore, it is similar to other European and American sign languages. Libras is not the simple sign language of the Portuguese language, but a separate language, as evidenced by the fact that in Portugal a different sign language is used, Portuguese Sign Language (LGP).

Like the various existing natural and human languages, it is composed of linguistic levels such as: phonology, morphology, syntax and semantics. Just as in oral-auditory languages there are words, in sign languages there are also lexical items, which are called signs. The difference is its modality of articulation, namely visual-spatial, or kinesic-visual, for others. Therefore, to communicate in Libras, it is not enough just to know signs. It is necessary to know your grammar to combine sentences, establishing communication correctly, avoiding the use of "signaled Portuguese".

Signals arise from the combination of hand configurations, movements, and points of articulation — places in space or on the body where signals are made — and also from facial and body expressions that convey the feelings that are conveyed to listeners by voice intonation, which together make up the basic units of this language. Thus, Libras presents itself as a linguistic system for the transmission of ideas and facts, coming from communities of deaf people in Brazil. As with any language, there are also regional differences in Libras. Therefore, attention should be paid to its variations in each federative unit of Brazil.

In addition to being recognized nationally since 2002, Libras has also been made official at the municipal level in Belo Horizonte, Curitiba, Ouro Preto and Salvador. In Rio de Janeiro, the teaching of Libras was made official in the curriculum of the municipal school system.

April 24 was made official as the National Day of Brazilian Sign Language.

== Minority languages ==
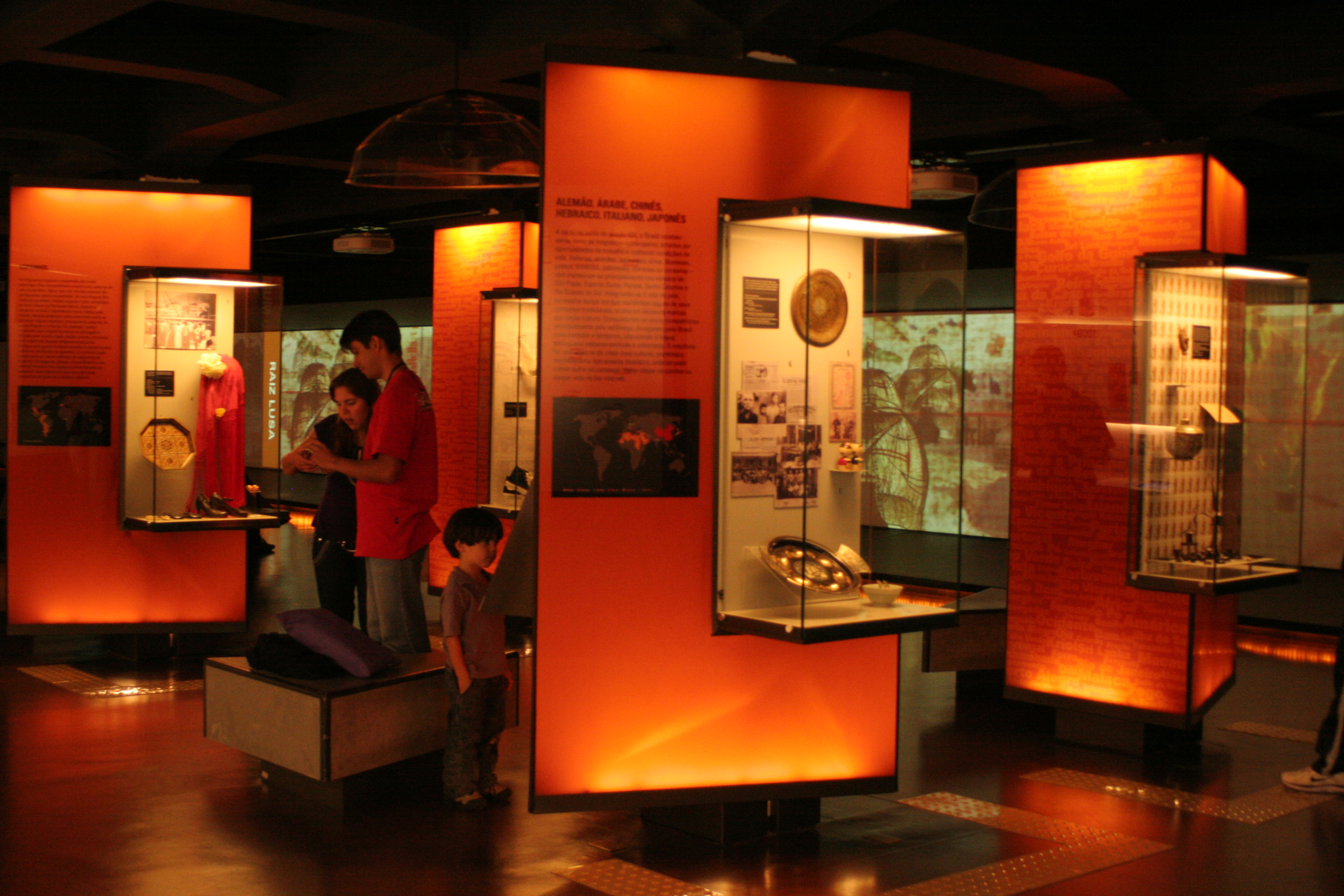
Museum of the Portuguese Language in São Paulo.

Despite the fact that Portuguese is the official language of Brazil and the vast majority of Brazilians speak only Portuguese, there are several other languages spoken in the country. According to the president of IBGE (Brazilian Institute of Geography and Statistics) there are an estimated 210 languages spoken in Brazil. 154 are Amerindian languages, while the others are languages brought by immigrants.

The 1950 census was the last one to ask Brazilians which language they speak at home. Since then, the census does not ask about language. However, the census of 2010 asked respondents which languages they speak, allowing a better analysis of the languages spoken in Brazil.

The first municipality to co-officialize other languages alongside Portuguese was São Gabriel da Cachoeira, in the state of Amazonas, with the languages Nheengatu, Tukano and Baniwa. Since then, other Brazilian municipalities have co-officialized other languages.

=== Immigrant languages ===
==== European immigrant languages ====
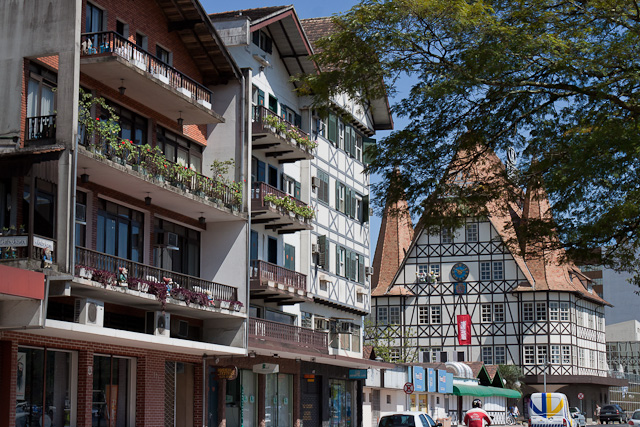
Blumenau, a southern Brazilian city with the presence of German language.

According to the 1940 census, after Portuguese, German was the most widely spoken language in Brazil. Although the Italian immigration to Brazil was much more significant than the German one, the German language had many more speakers than the Italian one, according to the census. The census revealed that two-thirds of the children of German immigrants spoke German at home. In comparison, half of the children of Italians spoke Portuguese at home. The stronger preservation of the German language when compared to the Italian one has many factors: Italian is closer to Portuguese than German, leading to a faster assimilation of the Italian speakers. Also, the German immigrants used to educate their children in German schools. The Italians, on the other hand, had less organized ethnic schools and the cultural formation was centered in church, not in schools. Most of the children of Italians went to public schools, where Portuguese was spoken. Until World War II, some 1.5 million Italians had immigrated to Brazil, compared to only 250,000 Germans. However, the 1940 census revealed that German was spoken as a home language by 644,458 people, compared to only 458,054 speakers of Italian.

Spaniards, who formed the third largest immigrant group in Brazil (after the Portuguese and Italians) were also quickly assimilated into the Portuguese-speaking majority. Spanish is similar to Portuguese, which led to a fast assimilation. Moreover, many of the Spanish immigrants were from Galicia, where they also speak Galician, which is closer to Portuguese, sometimes even being considered two dialects of the same language. Despite the large influx of Spanish immigrants to Brazil from 1880 to 1930 (over 700,000 people) the census of 1940 revealed that only 74,000 people spoke Spanish in Brazil.

Other languages such as Polish and Ukrainian, along with German and Italian, are spoken in rural areas of Southern Brazil, by small communities of descendants of immigrants, who are for the most part bilingual. There are whole regions in southern Brazil where people speak both Portuguese and one or more of these languages. For example, it is reported that more than 90% of the residents of the small city of Presidente Lucena, located in the state of Rio Grande do Sul, speak Hunsrik, a language derived from the Hunsrückisch dialect of German. Hunsrik, or Riograndenser Hunsrückisch, has around 3,000,000 native speakers in Brazil, while also having some speakers in Argentina, Paraguay and Venezuela. The language is most used in the countryside of the South Region states of Brazil, with a considerable amount of native speakers using it as their main or even only language.

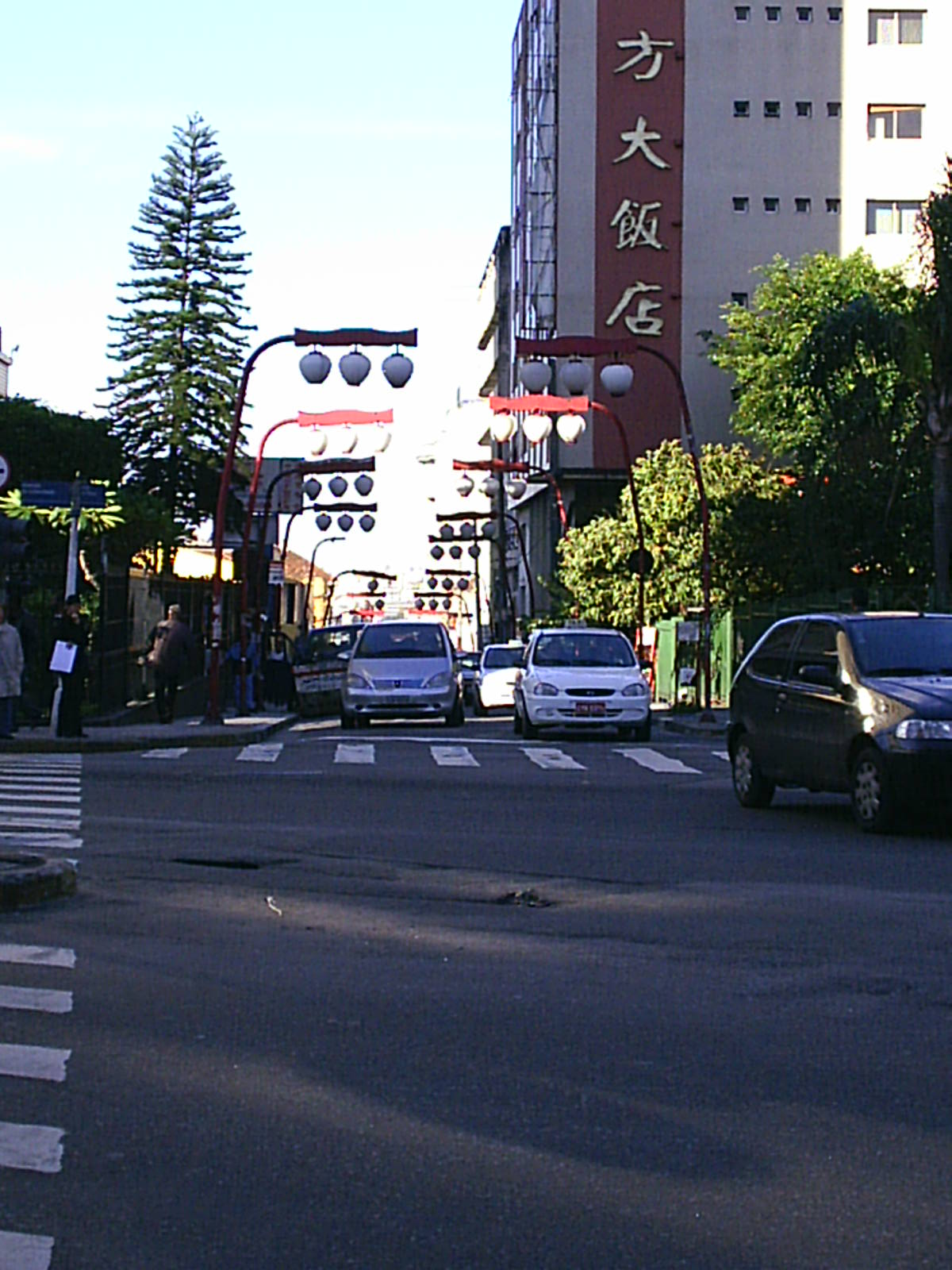
Liberdade, São Paulo, has the largest concentration of ethnic Japanese outside Japan.

Some immigrant communities in southern Brazil, chiefly the German and the Italian ones, have lasted long enough to develop distinctive dialects from their original European sources. For example, Brazilian German, a broad category which includes the Hunsrik language, but also East Pomerian and Plautdietsch dialects. In the Serra Gaúcha region, we can find Italian dialects such as Talian or italiano riograndense, based on the Venetian language.

Other German dialects were transplanted to this part of Brazil. For example, the Austrian dialect spoken in Dreizehnlinden or Treze Tílias in the state of Santa Catarina; or the dialect Schwowisch (Standard German: Schwäbisch), from Donauschwaben immigrants, is spoken in Entre Rios, Guarapuava, in the state of Paraná; or the East Pomeranian dialect spoken in many different parts of southern Brazil (in the states of Rio Grande do Sul, Santa Catarina, Paraná, Espírito Santo, São Paulo, etc.).

Plautdietsch is spoken by the descendants of Russian Mennonites. However, these languages have been rapidly replaced by Portuguese in the last few decades, partly due to a government decision to integrate immigrant populations. Today, states like Rio Grande do Sul are trying to reverse that trend and immigrant languages such as German and Italian are being reintroduced into the curriculum again, in communities where they originally thrived. Meanwhile, on the Argentinian and Uruguayan border regions, Brazilian students are being introduced to the Spanish language.

==== Asian languages ====
In the city of São Paulo, Korean, Chinese and Japanese can be heard in the immigrants districts, like Liberdade.

A Japanese-language newspaper, the São Paulo Shinbun, had been published in the city of São Paulo since 1946, still printing paper editions until January 2019. There is a significant community of Japanese speakers in São Paulo, Paraná, Mato Grosso do Sul, Pará and Amazonas. Much smaller groups exist in Santa Catarina, Rio Grande do Sul and other parts of Brazil. Some Chinese, especially from Macau, speak a Portuguese-based creole language called Macanese (patuá or macaísta), aside from Hakka, Mandarin and Cantonese.

Japanese immigration to Brazil started on June 18, 1908, when the Japanese ship Kasato-Maru arrived in the Port of Santos, south of São Paulo, carrying the first 781 people to take advantage of a bilateral agreement promoting immigration. Half of them were from the southern part of the Okinawa Island, located about 640 km (400 mi) south of the rest of Japan, which had its own distinct language and culture dating back to before the island's annexation by Tokyo in 1879. The names on shop fronts are in Japanese and selling everything from Japanese food and kitchen utensils to traditional home decorations. Red painted archways, Japanese temples and a Japanese garden are present in this little Japanese corner of Brazil. Today, Brazil is home to the world's largest community of Japanese descendants outside of Japan, numbering about 1.5 million people.

== Indigenous languages ==
Many Amerindian minority languages are spoken throughout Brazil, mostly in Northern Brazil. Indigenous languages with about 10,000 speakers or more are Ticuna (language isolate), Kaingang (Gean family), Kaiwá Guarani, Nheengatu (Tupian), Guajajára (Tupian), Macushi (Cariban), Terena (Arawakan), Xavante (Gean) and Mawé (Tupian). Tucano (Tucanoan) has half that number, but is widely used as a second language in the Amazon.

One of the two Brazilian línguas gerais (general languages), Nheengatu, was until the late 19th century the common language used by a large number of indigenous, European, African, and African-descendant peoples throughout the coast of Brazil—it was spoken by the majority of the population in the land. It was proscribed by the Marquis of Pombal for its association with the Jesuit missions. A recent resurgence in popularity of this language occurred, and it is now an official language in the city of São Gabriel da Cachoeira. Today, in the Amazon Basin, political campaigning is still printed in this Tupian language.

There is also an indigenous sign language, the Ka'apor Sign Language. There are also three other sign languages: Terena Sign Language, Marajo Sign Language, and Maxakali Sign Language.

In July 2023, the Brazilian Constitution of 1988 was translated for the first time into an indigenous language, the Nheengatu language.

Below is a full list of indigenous language families and isolates of Brazil based on Campbell (2012). The Macro-Jê classification follows that of Nikulin (2020). Additional extinct languages of Northeast Brazil have also been included from Meader (1978) and other sources.

1. Tupían
2. Arawakan
3. Cariban
4. Macro-Jê
  1. Karajá
  2. Ofayé
  3. Rikbáktsa
  4. Jabutí
  5. Jaikó
  6. Krenák
  7. Maxakalí
  8. Kamakã
  9. Jê
5. Boróro
6. Purí
7. Guató
8. Karirí
9. Otí
10. Chapacuran
11. Pano–Takanan
12. Nadahup (Makuan)
13. Tucanoan
14. Arawan
15. Guaicuruan
16. Katukinan
17. Muran
18. Nambikwaran
19. Tikuna–Yuri
20. Yanomaman
21. Aikanã
22. Awaké
23. Irantxe
24. Máku
25. Kanoê
26. Kwaza
27. Matanawí
28. Taruma
29. Trumai
30. Boran
31. Xukuruan
32. Yaté (Fulniô)

== Bilingualism ==
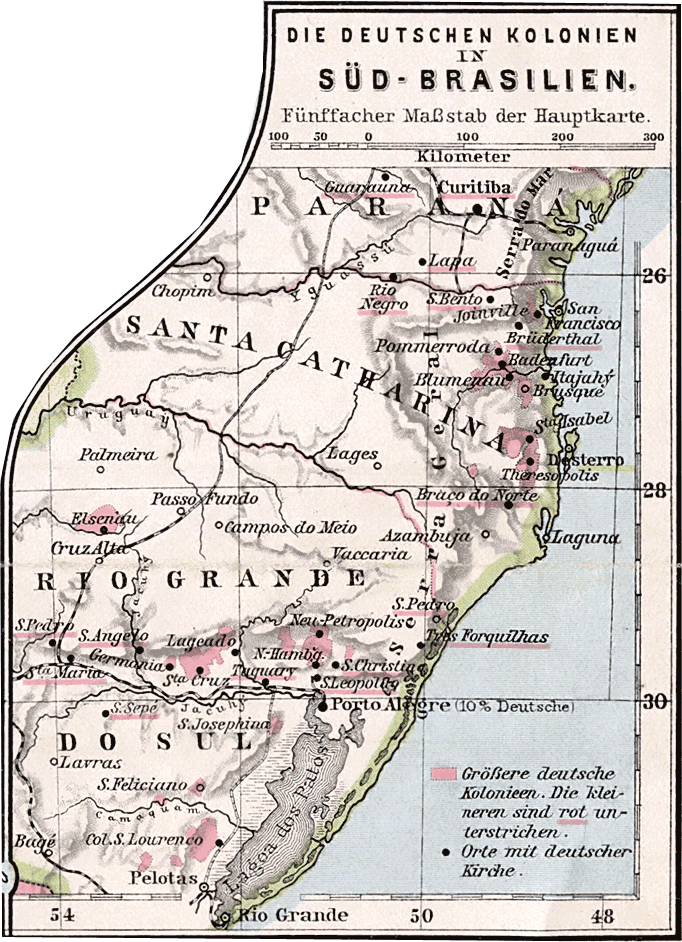
German colonies in Southern Brazil.

Spanish is understood to various degrees by many but not all Brazilians, due to the similarities of the languages. However, it is hardly spoken well by individuals who have not taken specific education in the language, due to the substantial differences in phonology between the two languages.

In São Paulo, the German-Brazilian newspaper Brasil-Post has been published for over fifty years. There are many other media organizations throughout the country specializing in church issues, music, language etc.

The online newspaper La Rena is in Talian dialect and it offers Talian lessons. There are many other non-Portuguese publications, bilingual web sites, radio and television programs throughout the country.

In the state of Paraná, there are several communities of Poles, Ukrainians and other Slavics that live in rural areas and in some municipalities such as Curitiba, Irati, Guarapuava, Ponta Grossa and Prudentópolis. Polish and Ukrainian are still spoken, mainly by older people. In the city of Foz do Iguaçu (on the border with Paraguay and Argentina), there are many Arabic speakers, these people are mainly immigrants from Palestine, Lebanon and Syria. In 2021, the city of São Mateus do Sul won the title of "Polish capital of Paraná".

In the state of Rio Grande do Sul, there are several cities and communities colonized by Germans and Italians. Most small towns have German or Italian as their second language. In the state capital, Porto Alegre, it is easy to find people who speak one or both of them.

There are also at least two ethnic neighborhoods in the country: Liberdade, bastion of Japanese immigrants, and Bixiga, stronghold of Italian immigrants, both in São Paulo; however, these neighborhoods do not count yet with specific legislation for the protection of Japanese and Italian languages in these sites.

Brazilian Roma speak Caló, a mixed language which uses both Portuguese and Romani words.

== Language policy ==
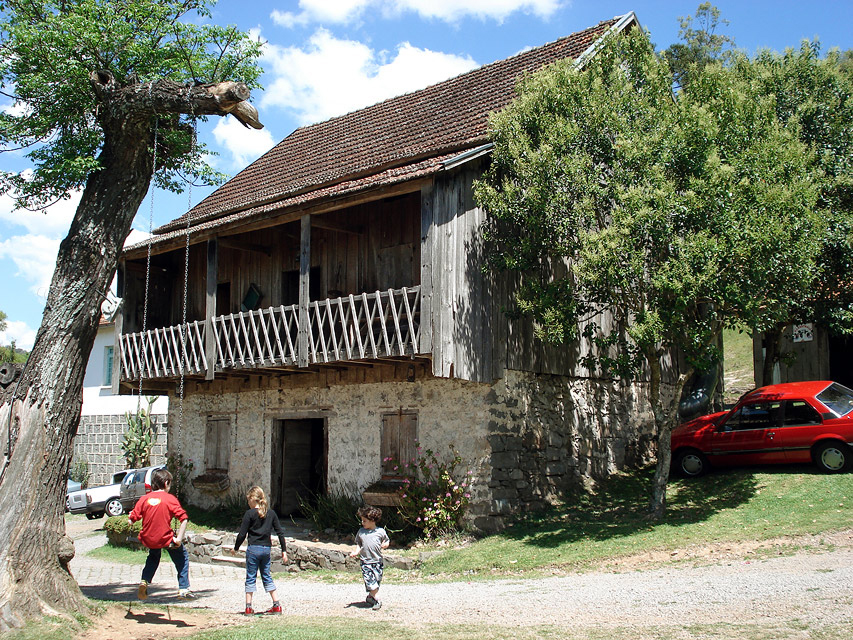
Typical house of Italian immigrants in the region of Caxias do Sul.

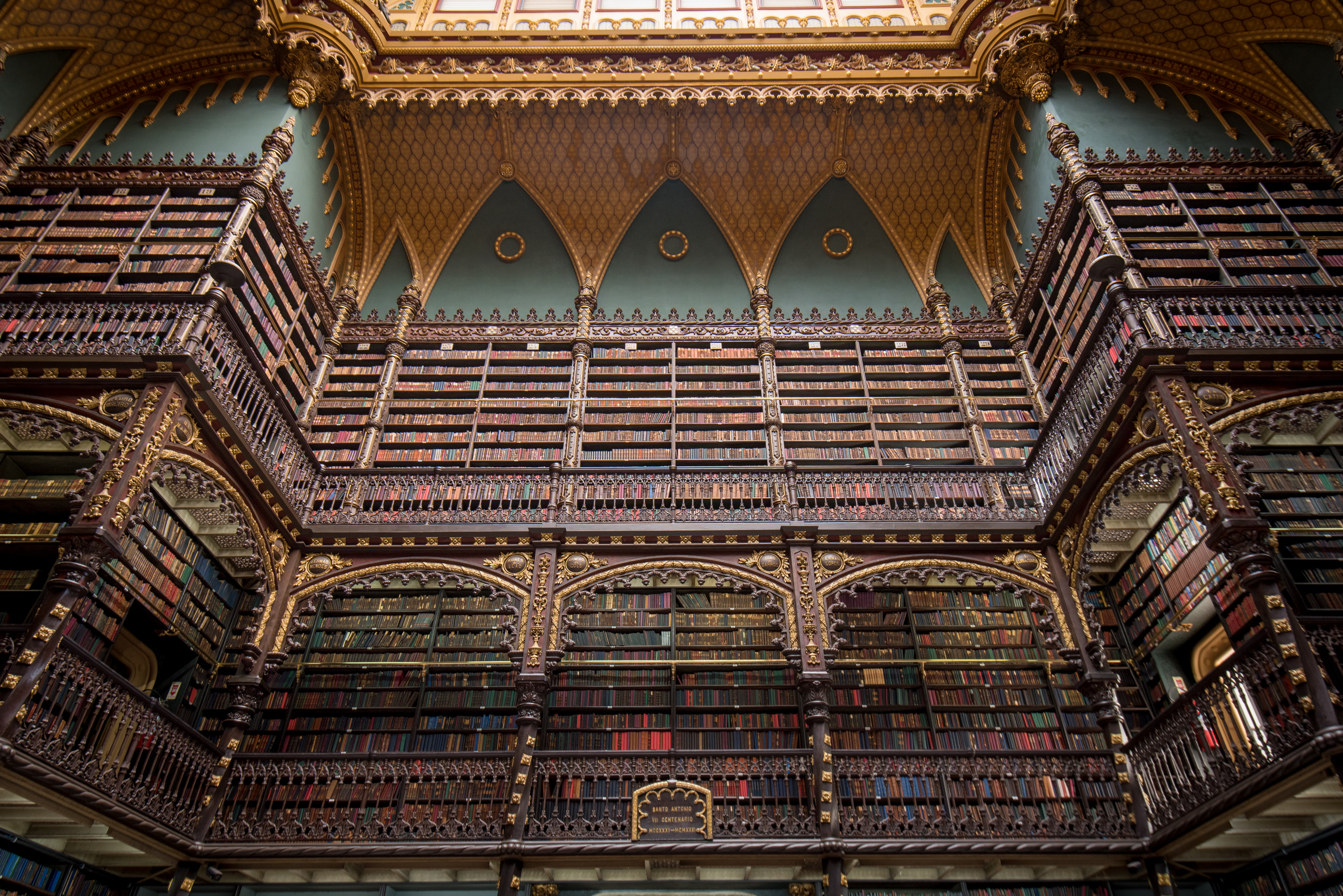
Royal Portuguese Cabinet of Reading in Rio de Janeiro.

The 21st century has seen the growth of a trend of co-official languages in cities populated by immigrants (such as Italian and German) or indigenous in the north, both with support from the Ministry of Tourism, as was recently established in Santa Maria de Jetibá, Pomerode and Vila Pavão, where East Pomeranian also has co-official status.

The first municipality to adopt a co-official language in Brazil was São Gabriel da Cachoeira, in 2002. Since then, other municipalities have attempted to adopt their own co-official languages.

Also in production is the documentary video Brasil Talian, with directed and written by André Costantin and executive producer of the historian Fernando Roveda. The pre-launch occurred on 18 November 2011, the date that marked the start of production of the documentary.

The states of Santa Catarina and Rio Grande do Sul have Talian officially approved as a heritage language in these states, and Espírito Santo has the East Pomeranian, along with the German language, such as cultural heritage state.

In 2019, Bill No. 489 was drafted, authored by Chico d'Ângelo, which provides linguistic rights for Brazilians, especially communities that use minority languages as their mother tongue. The Project was attached to Bill 304 of 2015, which establishes knowledge about the language, uses, customs and culture of the traditional peoples and communities and ethical minorities that form the Brazilian peoples in elementary school curricula. The Culture Commission approved the project on September 21, 2021.

In 2015 Serafina Corrêa received the title of national capital of Talian. In 2019 Nova Erechim was recognized as the capital of Talian in Santa Catarina. In 2021, Governor Ratinho Júnior sanctioned state law 20,757, which makes the municipality of Colombo the capital of Talian in Paraná.

=== Classification of languages as linguistic or cultural heritage ===
Brazilian states with linguistic heritages officially approved statewide:

- Espírito Santo — Pomeranian and German
- Mato Grosso do Sul — Guarani Kaiowá, Terena, Kinikinau, Kadiwéu, Guató and Ofayé.
- Rio de Janeiro — Yoruba, Bantu and Ewe
- Rio Grande do Sul — Talian and Riograndenser Hunsrückisch
- Roraima — Hixkaryána (Hixkariána), Ingarikó, Máku, Makuxí, Ninám, Pa tamóna (Kapóng), Sanumá, Taulipáng (Pemong), Waiwái, Wapixána, Yanomámi, Yekuána (Mayongóng)
- Santa Catarina — Talian and Riograndenser Hunsrückisch

Brazilian municipalities that have a language as intangible cultural heritage:

- Anta Gorda, Rio Grande do Sul — Talian
- Blumenau, Santa Catarina — German language
- Bom Despacho, Minas Gerais — Tabatinga language
- Capinzal, Santa Catarina — Talian
- Caxias do Sul, Rio Grande do Sul — Talian
- Harmonia, Rio Grande do Sul — German language
- Lajeado, Rio Grande do Sul — German language
- Mallet, Paraná — Polish and Ukrainian languages.
- Marechal Floriano, Espírito Santo — Talian and Friulian
- Nova Hartz, Rio Grande do Sul — German language
- Salvador, Bahia — Yoruba language
- Santa Cruz do Sul, Rio Grande do Sul — German language
- São Pedro de Alcântara, Santa Catarina — Hunsrik language
- Venâncio Aires, Rio Grande do Sul — German language
- Veranópolis, Rio Grande do Sul — Talian

=== Language co-officialization ===
States that have co-official indigenous languages:

- Amapá — Kheuol Karipuna, Kheuól Galibi-Marworno, Parikwaki, Kali`na, Wajãpi, Tiriyó, Kaxuyana, Wayana and Aparai.
- Amazonas — Apurinã, Baniwa, Dessana, Kanamari, Marubo, Matis, Matses, Mawe, Mura, Nheengatu, Tariana, Tikuna, Tukano, Waiwai, Waimiri and Yanomami.
- Roraima — Hixkaryána (Hixkariána), Ingarikó, Máku (extinct), Makuxí, Ninám, Patamóna (Kapóng), Sanumá, Taulipáng (Pemong), Waiwái, Wapixána, Yanomámi, Yekuána (Mayongóng)

Municipalities that have co-official indigenous languages:

- Santo Antônio do Içá, Amazonas (Ticuna)
- São Gabriel da Cachoeira, Amazonas (Nheengatu, Tukano and Baniwa)
- Porto Seguro, Bahia (Patxôhã)
- Santa Cruz Cabrália, Bahia (Patxôhã and Pataxó Sign Language)
- Crateús, Ceará (Dzubukuá)
- Monsenhor Tabosa, Ceará (Nheengatu)
- Barra do Corda, Maranhão (Guajajara)
- Rondonópolis, Mato Grosso (Boe Bororo)
- Amambai, Mato Grosso do Sul (Guarani Kaiowá)
- Coronel Sapucaia, Mato Grosso do Sul (Guarani)
- Dois Irmãos do Buriti, Mato Grosso do Sul (Terena)
- Miranda, Mato Grosso do Sul (Terena, Kinikinau, Terena Sign Language)
- Tacuru, Mato Grosso do Sul (Guarani)
- Teófilo Otoni, Minas Gerais (Maxacali)
- São Félix do Xingu, Pará (Kayapo)
- Rio Tinto, Paraíba (Tupi Potiguara Language and Potiguara Indigenous Sign Language), in the indigenous territory of Monte Mor
- João Câmara, Rio Grande do Norte (Tupi-Nheengatu)
- Bonfim, Roraima (Macushi) and (Wapishana)
- Cantá, Roraima (Macushi) and (Wapishana)
- José Boiteux, Santa Catarina (Xokleng)
- Itacajá, Tocantins (Krahô)
- Tocantínia, Tocantins (Xerénte)

Municipalities that have co-official East Pomeranian language:

- Afonso Cláudio, Espírito Santo (in the district of Mata Fria)
- Canguçu, Rio Grande do Sul (under approval)
- Domingos Martins, Espírito Santo
- Espigão d'Oeste, Rondônia
- Itarana, Espírito Santo
- Itueta, Minas Gerais
- Laranja da Terra, Espírito Santo
- Pancas, Espírito Santo
- Pomerode, Santa Catarina
- Santa Maria de Jetibá, Espírito Santo
- Vila Pavão, Espírito Santo

Municipalities that have co-official Friulian language:

- Ivorá, Rio Grande do Sul

Municipalities that have co-official German language:

- Blumenau, Santa Catarina
- Campina das Missões, Rio Grande do Sul
- José Boiteux, Santa Catarina
- Pomerode, Santa Catarina
- Santo Ângelo, Rio Grande do Sul
- São Bento do Sul, Santa Catarina
- São João do Oeste, Santa Catarina
- Ubiretama, Rio Grande do Sul

Municipalities that have co-official Italian language:

- Encantado, Rio Grande do Sul
- José Boiteux, Santa Catarina
- Santa Tereza, Espírito Santo
- Santo Ângelo, Rio Grande do Sul
- São Bento do Sul, Santa Catarina
- Venda Nova do Imigrante, Espírito Santo

Municipalities that have co-official Plattdüütsch language (or Plattdüütsch dialect):

- Palmeira, Paraná
- Westfália, Rio Grande do Sul

Municipalities that have co-official Polish language:

- Áurea, Rio Grande do Sul
- Campina das Missões, Rio Grande do Sul
- Carlos Gomes, Rio Grande do Sul
- Casca, Rio Grande do Sul
- Centenário, Rio Grande do Sul
- Cruz Machado, Paraná
- Dom Feliciano, Rio Grande do Sul
- Guarani das Missões, Rio Grande do Sul
- Horizontina, Rio Grande do Sul
- Ijuí, Rio Grande do Sul
- Itaiópolis, Santa Catarina
- Mallet, Paraná
- Nova Prata, Rio Grande do Sul
- Papanduva, Santa Catarina
- Paula Freitas, Paraná
- Santo Ângelo, Rio Grande do Sul
- São Bento do Sul, Santa Catarina
- Sete de Setembro, Rio Grande do Sul
- São Mateus do Sul, Paraná
- Ubiretama, Rio Grande do Sul
- Vista Alegre do Prata, Rio Grande do Sul

Municipalities that have co-official language Riograndenser Hunsrückisch language:

- Antônio Carlos, Santa Catarina
- Ijuí, Rio Grande do Sul
- Ipumirim, Santa Catarina
- Itá, Santa Catarina
- Harmonia, Rio Grande do Sul
- Horizontina, Rio Grande do Sul
- Treze Tílias, Santa Catarina (language teaching is compulsory in schools, standing on stage in public official of the municipality)
- Santa Maria do Herval, Rio Grande do Sul
- Barão, Rio Grande do Sul

Municipalities with co-official Russian language:

- Campina das Missões, Rio Grande do Sul

Municipalities that have co-official Talian language (or Venetian dialect):

- Anta Gorda, Rio Grande do Sul
- Antônio Prado, Rio Grande do Sul
- Barão, Rio Grande do Sul
- Bento Gonçalves, Rio Grande do Sul
- Camargo, Rio Grande do Sul
- Casca, Rio Grande do Sul
- Caxias do Sul, Rio Grande do Sul
- Chopinzinho, Paraná
- Coronel Pilar, Rio Grande do Sul
- Cotiporã, Rio Grande do Sul
- Doutor Ricardo, Rio Grande do Sul
- Fagundes Varela, Rio Grande do Sul
- Farroupilha, Rio Grande do Sul
- Flores da Cunha, Rio Grande do Sul
- Garibaldi, Rio Grande do Sul
- Gentil, Rio Grande do Sul
- Guabiju, Rio Grande do Sul
- Guaporé, Rio Grande do Sul
- Guarani das Missões, Rio Grande do Sul
- Horizontina, Rio Grande do Sul
- Ijuí, Rio Grande do Sul
- Ipumirim, Santa Catarina
- Itá, Santa Catarina
- Ivorá, Rio Grande do Sul
- Marau, Rio Grande do Sul
- Monte Belo do Sul, Rio Grande do Sul
- Nova Bassano, Rio Grande do Sul
- Nova Erechim, Santa Catarina
- Nova Pádua, Rio Grande do Sul
- Nova Prata, Rio Grande do Sul
- Nova Roma do Sul, Rio Grande do Sul
- Paraí, Rio Grande do Sul
- Pinto Bandeira, Rio Grande do Sul
- Putinga, Rio Grande do Sul
- Sananduva, Rio Grande do Sul
- São Jorge, Rio Grande do Sul
- São Miguel do Oeste, Santa Catarina
- Serafina Corrêa, Rio Grande do Sul
- Silveira Martins, Rio Grande do Sul
- União da Serra, Rio Grande do Sul
- Venda Nova do Imigrante, Espírito Santo
- Veranópolis, Rio Grande do Sul
- Vila Flores, Rio Grande do Sul
- Vila Maria, Rio Grande do Sul
- Vista Alegre do Prata, Rio Grande do Sul

Municipalities that have co-official Trentinian language (or Trentinian dialect):

- Laurentino, Santa Catarina
- Rodeio, Santa Catarina

Municipalities that have co-official Ukrainian language:

- Itaiópolis, Santa Catarina
- Mallet, Paraná
- Papanduva, Santa Catarina
- Paula Freitas, Paraná
- Prudentópolis, Paraná

=== Officialization in education ===
Municipalities in which the teaching of the German language is mandatory:

- Nova Petrópolis, Rio Grande do Sul
- Blumenau, Santa Catarina
- Treze Tílias, Santa Catarina

Municipalities in which the teaching of the Hunsrik language is mandatory:

- Nova Hartz, Rio Grande do Sul

Municipalities in which the teaching of the Italian language is mandatory:

- Venda Nova do Imigrante, Espírito Santo
- Francisco Beltrão, Paraná
- Antônio Prado, Rio Grande do Sul
- Brusque, Santa Catarina
- Criciúma, Santa Catarina

== See also ==
- Indigenous languages of South America
- List of Brazil state name etymologies
- Reintegracionism (About Portuguese and Galician)
- Italian language in Brazil
