= Talian dialect =

Venetian dialect of southern Brazil

Talian
- taliàn
- Pronunciation: Venetian: [taˈljaŋ]
- Native to: Brazil (co-official language in several municipalities)
- Region: Serra Gaúcha
- Ethnicity: Venetian Brazilians
- Native speakers: (undated figure of 500,000)
- Language family: Indo-European: Italic; Latino-Faliscan; Latin; Romance; Italo-Western; (disputed); Venetian; Talian
- Writing system: Latin

Official status
- Recognised minority language in: Rio Grande do Sul; Santa Catarina; Paraná; Espírito Santo

Language codes
- ISO 639-3: –
- Glottolog: tali1266
- IETF: vec-BR

Talian (Venetian: [taˈljaŋ], Brazilian Portuguese: [taliˈɐ̃]), also known as Brazilian Venetian or Brazilian Italian, is a Venetian dialect spoken primarily in the Serra Gaúcha region in the northeast of the state of Rio Grande do Sul in Brazil, as well as in other parts of Rio Grande do Sul, and in parts of Espírito Santo and of Santa Catarina.

It is a "Recognised Minority Language" in 4 states of Brazil: Rio Grande do Sul, Santa Catarina, Paraná and Espírito Santo. The word "Talian" is the same used in Veneto to name the Italian language.

Talian is mainly a Venetian dialect mixed with Italian dialects from the Veneto region as well as Lombardy and other Italian regions, influenced by local Portuguese.

== History ==
Italian settlers first began arriving into these regions in a wave of immigration lasting from approximately 1875 to 1914. These settlers were mainly from Veneto, a region in Northern Italy, where Venetian was spoken, but also from Trentino and Friuli-Venezia Giulia. In the south of Brazil these immigrants settled as smallholders in the region of Encosta da Serra. There they created three settlements: Conde D'Eu (now Garibaldi), Dona Isabel (now Bento Gonçalves), and Campo dos Bugres (now Caxias do Sul). As more people arrived, the Italian settlement expanded beyond these localities. Approximately 100,000 immigrants from Northern Italy arrived between 1875 and 1910. As time went by, a uniquely southern Brazilian dialect emerged. Veneto became the basis for Italian-Brazilian regionalism.

Talian has been very much influenced not only by other Italian languages but also Portuguese, the national language of Brazil; this can be seen in the employment of numerous non-Venetian loanwords. It has been estimated that there have been 130 books published in Talian, including works of both poetry and prose.

Similar to Riograndenser Hunsrückisch (hunsriqueano riograndense), the main German dialect spoken by southern Brazilians of German origin, Talian has suffered great deprecation since the 1940s. At that time, president Getúlio Vargas started the so-called Nationalization Campaign to force non-Portuguese speakers of Brazil to "better integrate" into the national mainstream culture. Speaking Talian or German in public, especially in education and press, was forbidden.

== Vocabulary ==
Sample words in Talian
Talian	Standard Italian	English	Venetian
mi	io	I/me	mi
ti / te	tu	you (singular)	ti
lu / el / elo	lui	he	eło
noaltri / noantri	noi	we	noialtri / noialtre
voaltri / valtri / voalti	voi	you (plural)	voialtri / voialtre
lori	loro	they	łuri / łore
bambin / putel / fantolin	bambino	child	putel
fòja / fógia	foglia	leaf	foja / fogia
côa / coda	coda	tail	cóa / coda
cavel / cavegio / caigio	capello	hair	cavel / caveło / cavéjo
recia	orecchia	ear	recia
sufiar / supiare	soffiare	to blow	sufiar / sbufar
tajar / taiar	tagliare	to cut	tajar
pióva	pioggia	rain	piova
brasilian / brasiliero	brasiliano	Brazilian	brasilian

Sample text:

The Lord's Prayer in Talian
Talian	English	Venetian
Pupà nostro che stai nel cielo,	Our father which art in heaven,	Pare Nostro che te si nei ciei
Santificà sìa el tuo nome,	Hallowed be thy name,	Sia santificà el to nome;
Vegna a noantri el vostro regno,	Thy kingdom come,	Vegna el to regno
Sia fata la tua volontà,	Thy will be done,	Sia fata ła to vołontà
Coss'in tera come nel cielo.	on earth, as it is in heaven.	In tera così come in ciel.
Dai a noantri el pan de cada giorno,	Give us this day our daily bread,	Dane anquo el nostro pan quotidiano,
Perdona i nostri pecati,	And forgive us our debts,	Rimeti a noialtri i nostri debiti,
Come noantri perdonemo a quei che noi ga ofendesto	As we forgive our debtors	Come noialtri i rimetemo ai nostri debitori
E non assar che caschemo in tentassion,	And lead us not into temptation,	E non sta portarne in tentasion,
Ma liberta noantri de tuto el mal. Amem.	But deliver us from evil. Amen.	Ma liberane dal maigno. Amen.

== Current status ==
Municipalities where Talian is co-official in Rio Grande do Sul.

Talian has historically been spoken mainly in the southern Brazilian states of Rio Grande do Sul, Santa Catarina and Paraná, as well as in Espírito Santo. Nowadays, there are approximately 3 million people of Italian ancestry in Rio Grande do Sul, about 30% of the local population, and approximately 1.7 million people in Espírito Santo, which accounts for 65% of the local population. According to some estimates, there are up to one million Italian descendants; Ethnologue reported 4,000,000 Italian descendants in the year 2006, but these numbers do not reflect absolutely the number of Talian speakers. During the "Estado Novo" period of the government of Getúlio Vargas, the use of Talian was declared illegal. As a result of the traumas of Vargas' policies, there is, even to this day, a stigma attached to speaking these languages.

In 2009, the legislative assemblies of the states of Rio Grande do Sul and Santa Catarina approved laws declaring the Talian dialect to be an integral part of the historical heritage of their respective states. In 2009, the city of Serafina Corrêa, in Rio Grande do Sul, elected Talian as co-official language, alongside Portuguese. Finally, in 2014 Talian was declared to be part of the cultural heritage of Brazil (Língua e referência cultural brasileira) by the National Institute of Historic and Artistic Heritage.

In 2015 Serafina Corrêa received the title of national capital of Talian. In 2019 Nova Erechim was recognized as the capital of Talian in Santa Catarina. In 2021, Governor Ratinho Júnior sanctioned state law 20,757, which makes the municipality of Colombo the capital of Talian in Paraná.

Newspapers in the Talian-speaking region feature articles written in the language. There are some radio programs broadcast in Talian.

=== Municipalities in Brazil that have co-official Talian language ===
- Anta Gorda, Rio Grande do Sul
- Antônio Prado, Rio Grande do Sul
- Bento Gonçalves, Rio Grande do Sul
- Camargo, Rio Grande do Sul
- Casca, Rio Grande do Sul
- Caxias do Sul, Rio Grande do Sul
- Coronel Pilar, Rio Grande do Sul
- Chopinzinho, Paraná
- Cotiporã, Rio Grande do Sul
- Doutor Ricardo, Rio Grande do Sul
- Encantado, Rio Grande do Sul
- Fagundes Varela, Rio Grande do Sul
- Farroupilha, Rio Grande do Sul
- Flores da Cunha, Rio Grande do Sul
- Garibaldi, Rio Grande do Sul
- Gentil, Rio Grande do Sul
- Guabiju, Rio Grande do Sul
- Guaporé, Rio Grande do Sul
- Guarani das Missões, Rio Grande do Sul
- Horizontina, Rio Grande do Sul
- Ijuí, Rio Grande do Sul
- Ipumirim, Santa Catarina
- Itá, Santa Catarina
- Ivorá, Rio Grande do Sul
- Marau, Rio Grande do Sul
- Monte Belo do Sul, Rio Grande do Sul
- Nova Bassano, Rio Grande do Sul
- Nova Erechim, Santa Catarina
- Nova Pádua, Rio Grande do Sul
- Nova Prata, Rio Grande do Sul
- Nova Roma do Sul, Rio Grande do Sul
- Paraí, Rio Grande do Sul
- Pinto Bandeira, Rio Grande do Sul
- Putinga, Rio Grande do Sul
- Sananduva, Rio Grande do Sul
- São Jorge, Rio Grande do Sul
- São Miguel do Oeste, Santa Catarina
- Serafina Corrêa, Rio Grande do Sul
- Silveira Martins, Rio Grande do Sul
- União da Serra, Rio Grande do Sul
- Venda Nova do Imigrante, Espírito Santo
- Veranópolis, Rio Grande do Sul
- Vila Flores, Rio Grande do Sul
- Vila Maria, Rio Grande do Sul
- Vista Alegre do Prata, Rio Grande do Sul

=== Brazilian municipalities where Talian has historical and cultural heritage status ===
- Anta Gorda, Rio Grande do Sul
- Capinzal, Santa Catarina
- Caxias do Sul, Rio Grande do Sul
- Marechal Floriano, Espírito Santo
- Veranópolis, Rio Grande do Sul

=== Brazilian states with Talian as linguistic heritage officially approved statewide ===
- Rio Grande do Sul
- Santa Catarina

== See also ==
- Italian Brazilians
- Chipilo Venetian dialect
- Venetian language
- Languages of Brazil
- Languages of South America
- Italian language in Brazil
