= José Boiteux =

- Municipality
- Flag Coat of arms

- Location in Santa Catarina, Brazil

- Location in Brazil
- Coordinates: 26°57′28″S 49°37′40″W
- Country: Brazil
- Region: South
- State: Santa Catarina
- Mesoregion: Vale do Itajai

Government
  - Mayor: Jonas Pudewell

Area
  - Total: 156.585 sq mi (405.552 km^{2})

Population (2020)
  - Total: 5,007
  - Density: 31.98/sq mi (12.35/km^{2})
- Time zone: UTC -3
- Website: www.pmjb.sc.gov.br

José Boiteux is a municipality in the state of Santa Catarina in the South region of Brazil.

== See also ==
- List of municipalities in Santa Catarina
