= Mallet, Paraná =

Coordinates: 25°52′40″S 50°49′15″W

- Municipality
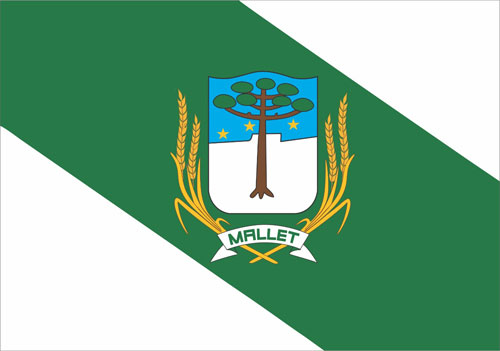
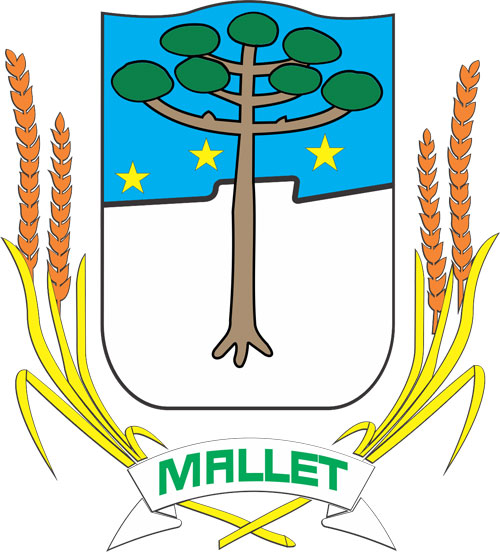
- Flag Coat of arms
- Interactive map of Mallet, Paraná
- Country: Brazil
- Region: Southern
- State: Paraná
- Mesoregion: Sudeste Paranaense

Population (2020)
  - Total: 13,663
- Time zone: UTC−3 (BRT)

Mallet, Paraná is a municipality in the state of Paraná in the Southern Region of Brazil.

== Ukrainian Heritage ==
About 60% of Mallet municipality population traces their roots back to ukrainian settelers, coming mainly from emmigration from Austria-Hungary during 19th century.

Since 13th of June, 2022, Ukrainian Language has status of co-official in the municipality, alongside Portuguese.

== Name ==
The town is named for the Brazilian Army Marshal Émile Mallet, Baron of Itapevi, with his name being mentioned in its hymn.

== See also ==
- List of municipalities in Paraná
