= Campina das Missões =

Municipality in Rio Grande do Sul, Brazil

Municipality of Campina das Missões
- Municipality
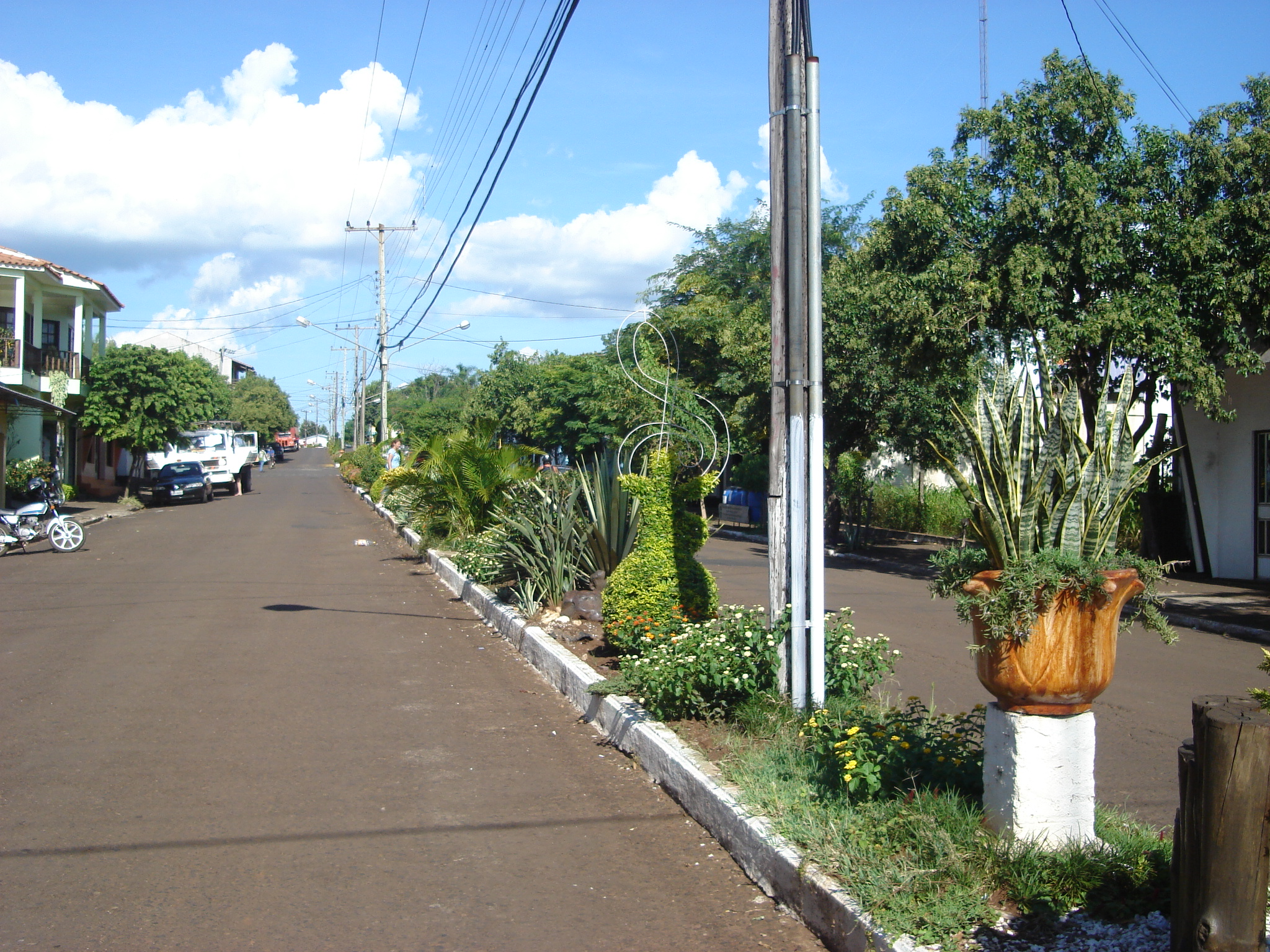

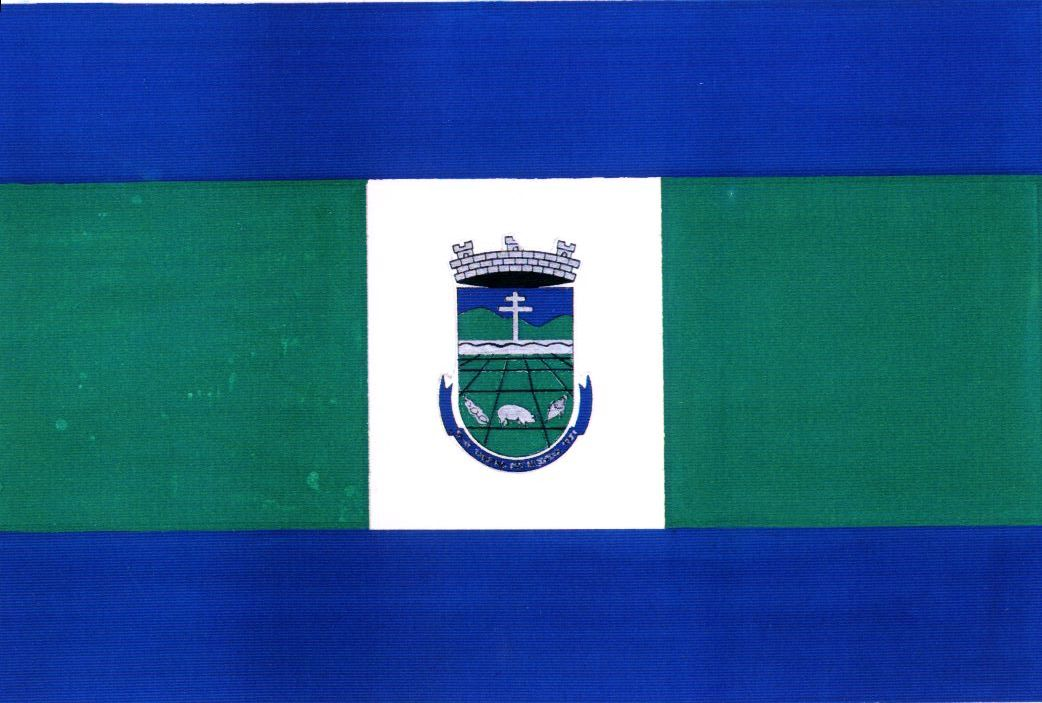
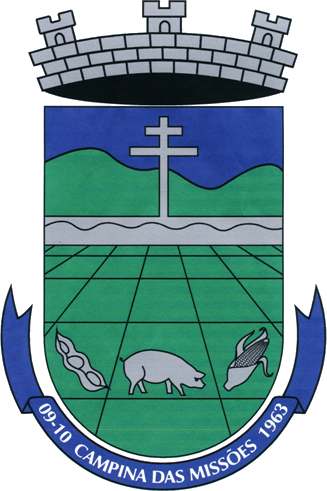
- Flag Coat of arms
- Motto: 09-10 Campina das Missões 1963
- Coordinates: 27°59′20″S 54°50′20″W
- Country: Brazil
- Region: South
- State: Rio Grande do Sul
- Settled: 1902
- Incorporated: 1963

Government
  - Mayor: Ademir Renato Nedel (PMDB)

Area
  - Total: 227.91 km^{2} (88.00 sq mi)
- Elevation: 163 m (535 ft)

Population (2020)
  - Total: 5,398
  - Density: 28.6/km^{2} (74/sq mi)
- Time zone: UTC−3 (BRT)

Campina das Missões is a Brazilian municipality of the state of the Rio Grande do Sul, located at latitude 27º59'20" S and longitude 54º50'22" W, being at an altitude of 163 meters. Its population estimate in 2020 was 5,398 inhabitants.

== Minority language region ==
Like many towns in the state which were first settled by German-speaking Europeans, the German language is still present in daily family and community life, if not as much in the public sphere since World War II; the regional German dialect is called Riograndenser Hunsrückisch, as it is a Brazilian variant of the dialect spoken in the Hunsrück region of southwest Germany. In 2012 the state chamber of deputies voted unanimously in favor of recognizing this Germanic dialect an official historical culture good to be preserved.

== See also ==
- German-Brazilian
- List of municipalities in Rio Grande do Sul
