= Treze Tílias =

Treze Tílias Dreizehnlinden
- Municipality
- Municipality of Treze Tílias; Municipality of Dreizehnlinden
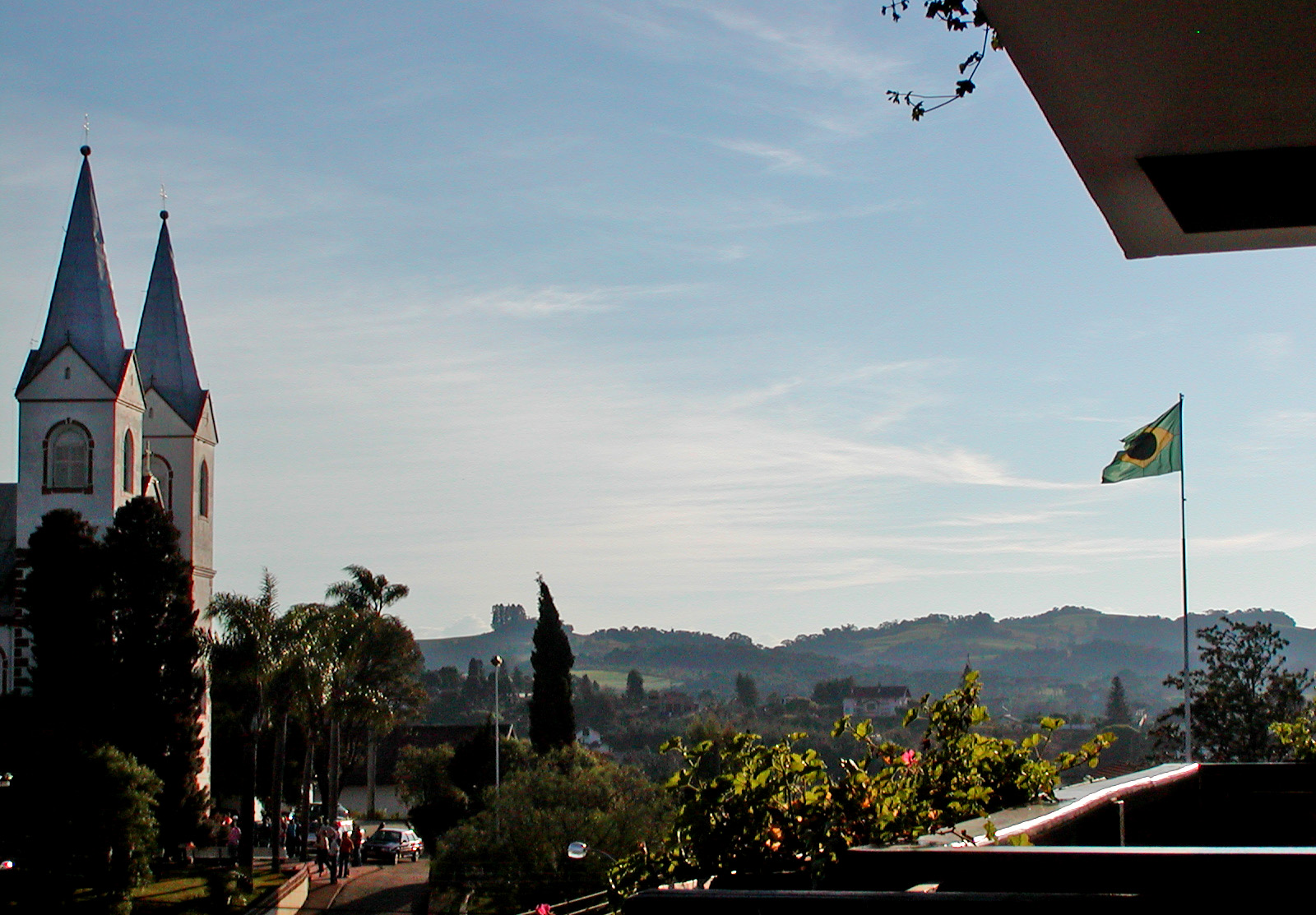
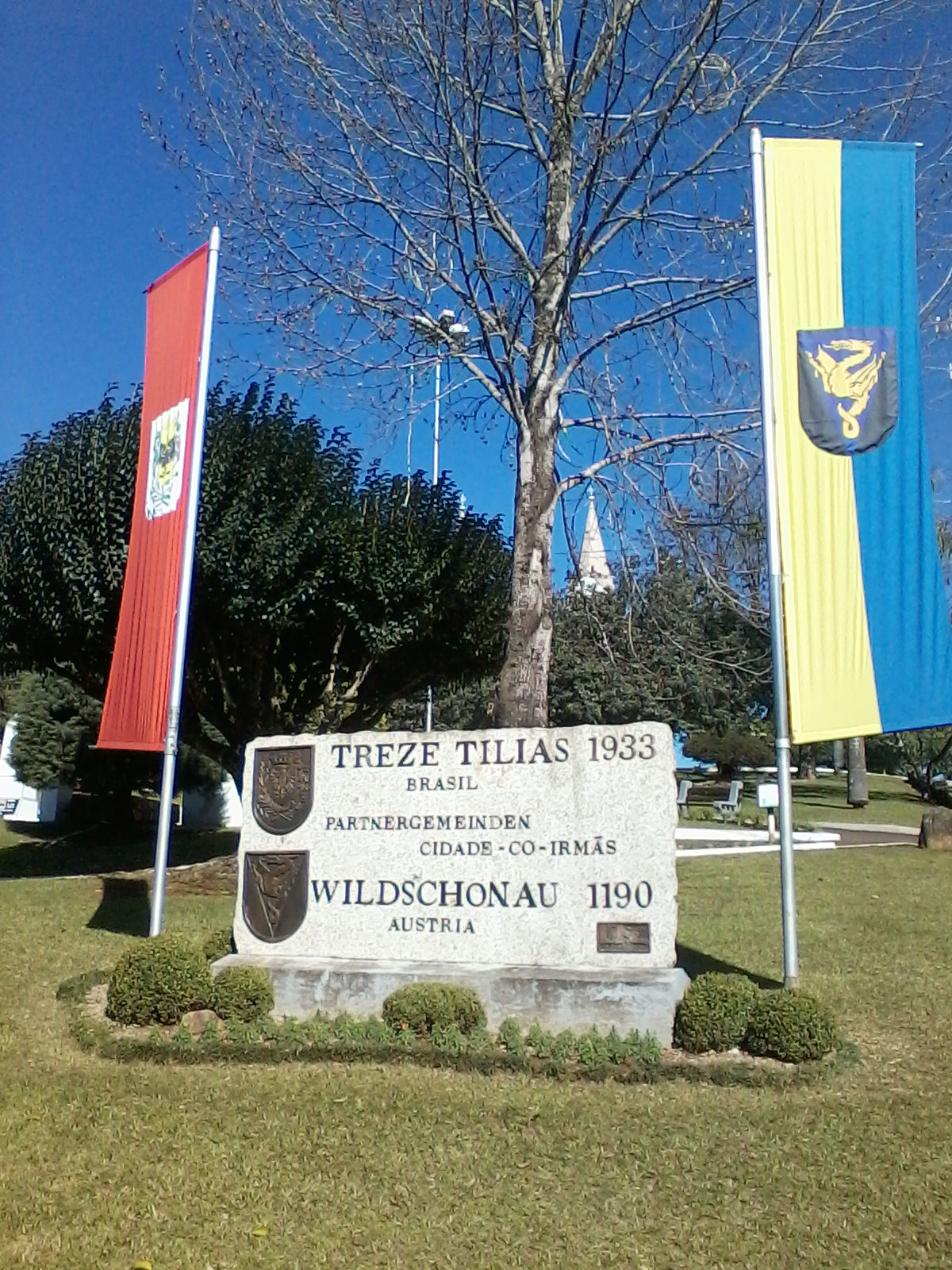
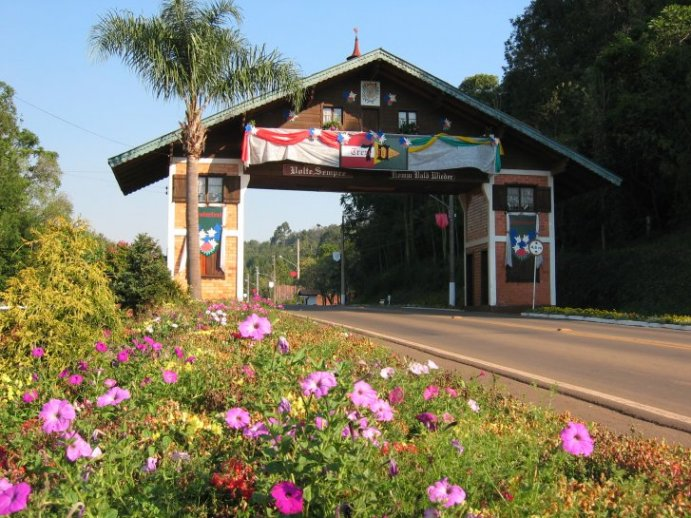
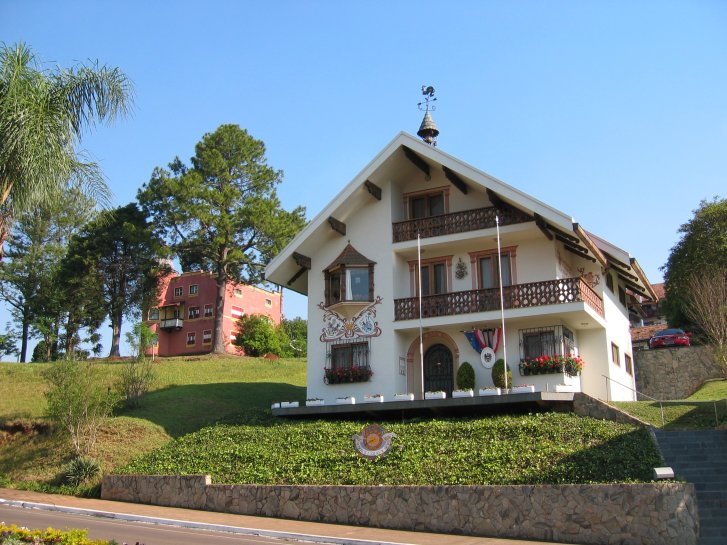
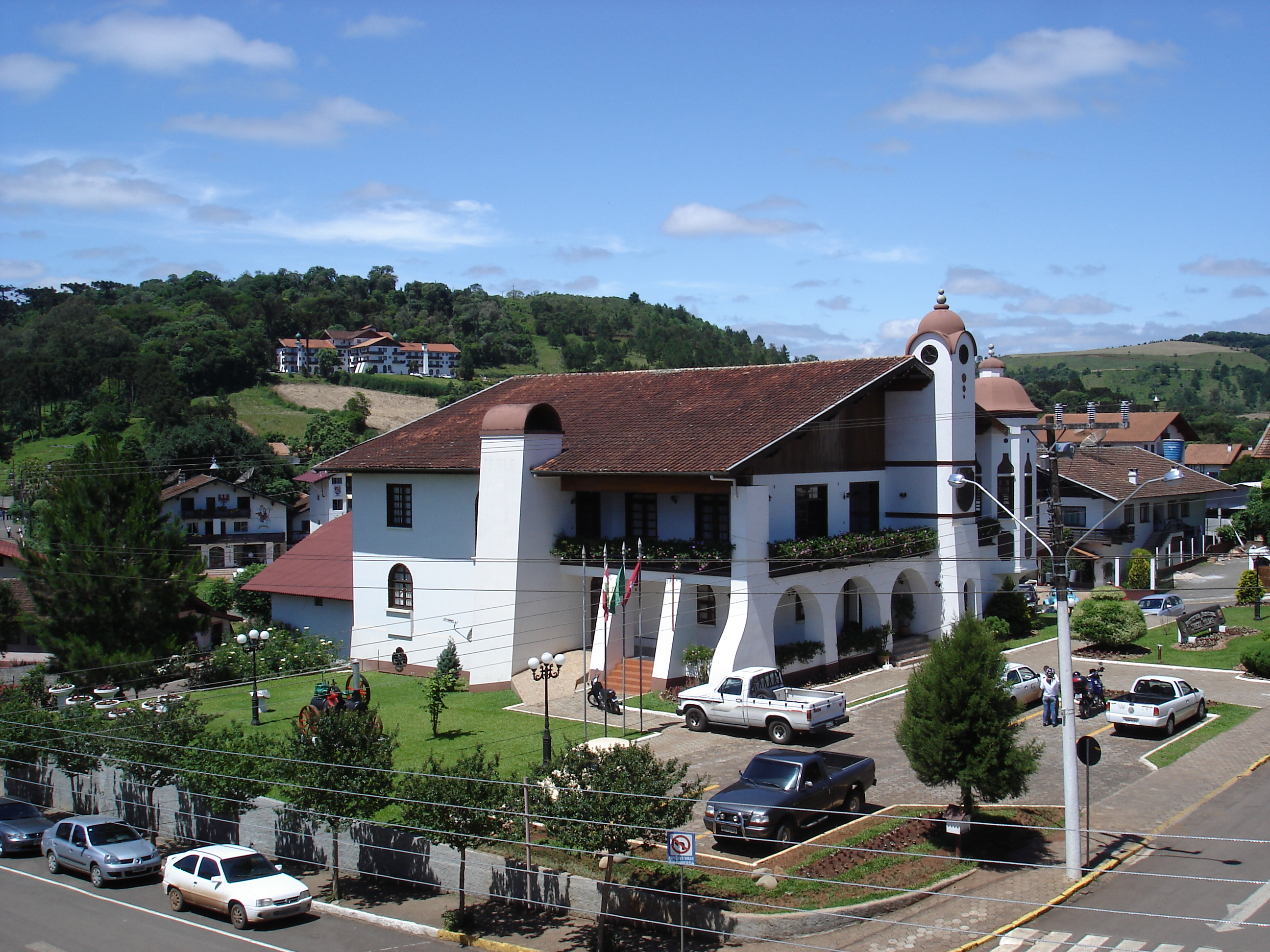
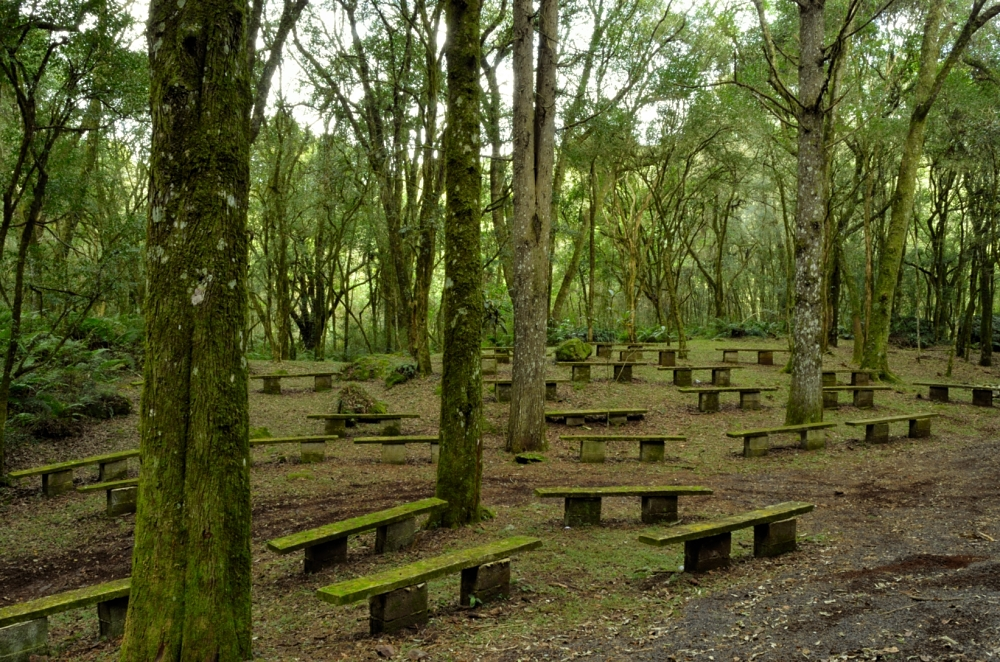

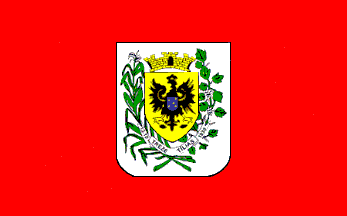
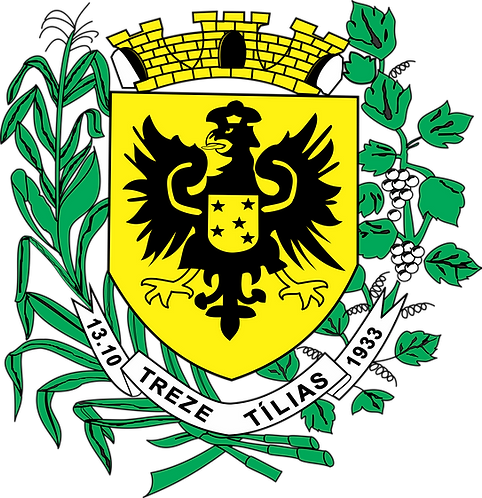
- Flag Coat of arms

- Location of Treze Tilias

- Location within Brazil
- Coordinates: 27°00′07″S 51°24′21″W
- Country: Brazil
- Region: South
- State: Santa Catarina
- Founded: 29 April 1963

Government
  - Mayor: Mauro Dresch (PSD)

Area
  - Total: 185.205 km^{2} (71.508 sq mi)
- Elevation: 796 m (2,612 ft)

Population (2020)
  - Total: 7,991
  - Density: 29.4/km^{2} (76/sq mi)
- Time zone: UTC-3 (UTC-3)
  - Summer (DST): UTC-2 (UTC-2)
- HDI (2010): 0.795 – high
- Website: www.trezetilias.sc.gov.br

Treze Tílias (German: Dreizehnlinden, literally "Thirteen Lindens") is a municipality located in the state of Santa Catarina, South Region, Brazil. It covers about 185.205 km^{2} and sits about 470 km from the state capital, Florianópolis. The municipality population estimate for 2020 is 7,991. Treze Tílias was originally created on 13 October 1933, the result of an emigration scheme supported by the Austrian government in Vienna. Dreizehnlinden is known for its maintenance of Austrian culture and language until the present as well as its resistance to Nazi-Germany take-over after Anschluss in 1938.

Founded by Austrian immigrants, the large majority from Tyrol and Vorarlberg, Treze Tílias exhibits an Alpine-influenced timber framing style of architecture. Most residents speak Portuguese and the southern Austro-Bavarian dialect of Austrian German. The economy of Treze Tílias is based on agriculture, tourism, and woodworking.
