= Harmonia, Rio Grande do Sul =

Municipality of Rio Grande do Sul, Brazil

Harmonia
- Municipality
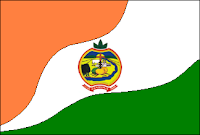
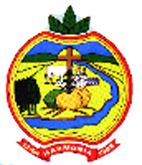
- Flag Coat of arms

- Location within Rio Grande do Sul

- Location in Brazil
- Coordinates: 29°32′52″S 51°25′32″W
- Country: Brazil
- State: Rio Grande do Sul

Population (2020)
  - Total: 4,917
- Time zone: UTC−3 (BRT)

Harmonia is a municipality in the state of Rio Grande do Sul, Brazil.

It is situated at 126 m above sea level, has a population of 4,917 (2020 estimate) and occupies an area of 48.663 km^{2}.

== See also ==
- List of municipalities in Rio Grande do Sul
