= Papanduva =

Coordinates: 26°25′S 50°09′W

- Municipality
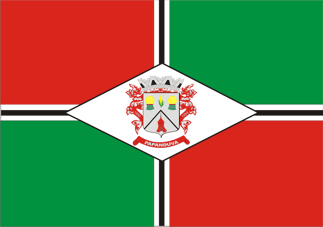
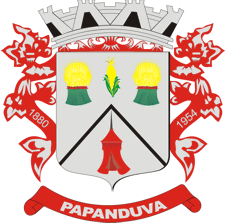
- Flag Coat of arms
- Interactive map of Papanduva
- Country: Brazil
- Region: South
- State: Santa Catarina
- Mesoregion: Norte Catarinense

Population (2020)
  - Total: 19,422
- Time zone: UTC -3

Papanduva is a municipality in the state of Santa Catarina in the South region of Brazil.

== See also ==
- List of municipalities in Santa Catarina
