= Ivorá =

Municipality of Rio Grande do Sul, Brazil

- Municipality
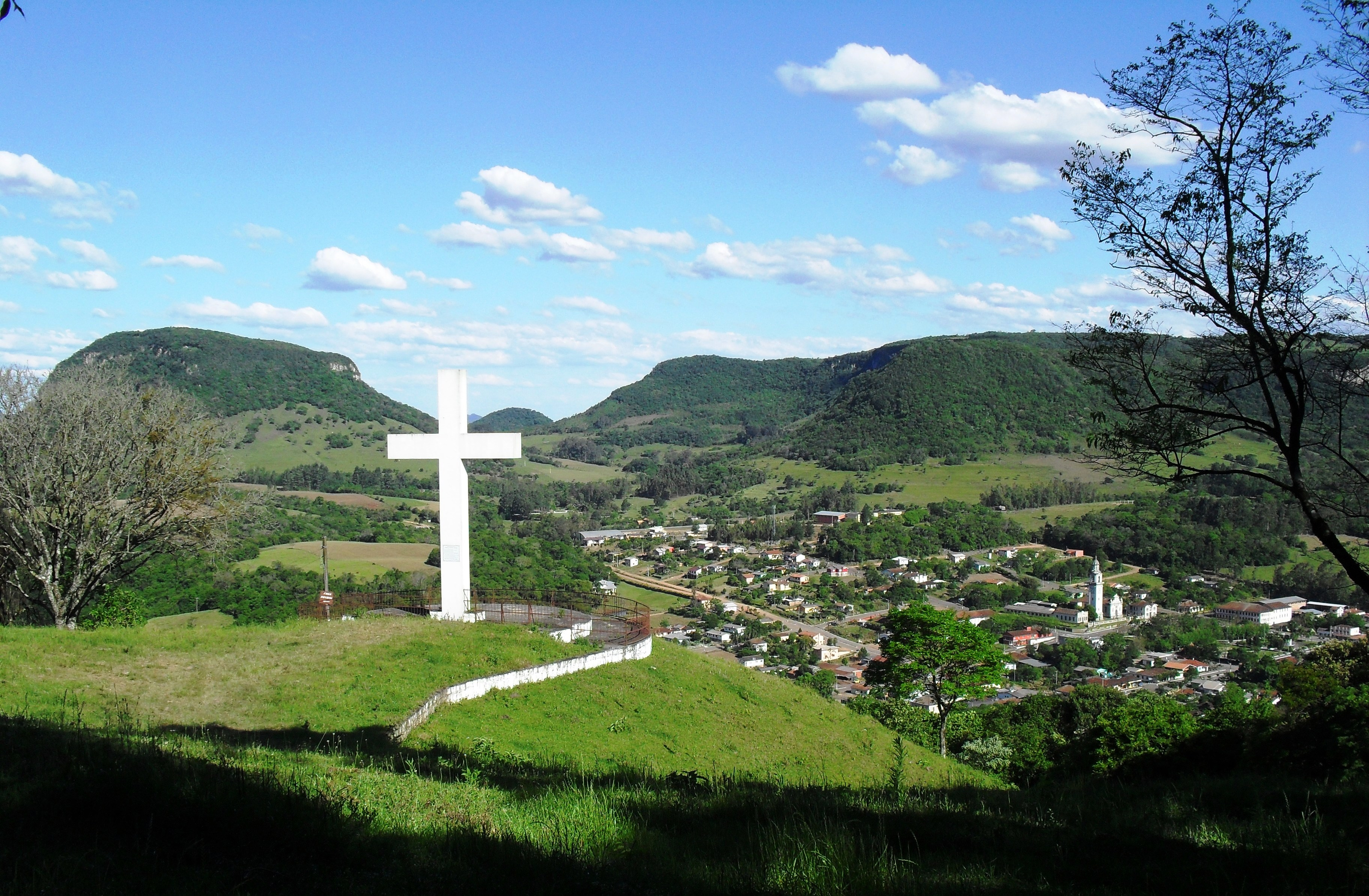
- View of Ivorá

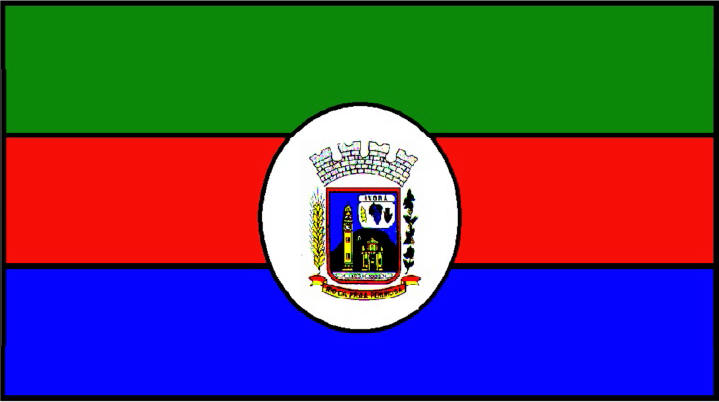
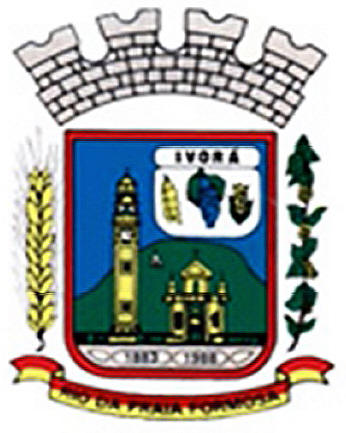
- Flag Coat of arms

- Location within Rio Grande do Sul

- Location in Brazil
- Coordinates: 29°32′S 53°34′W
- Country: Brazil
- State: Rio Grande do Sul

Population (2022)
  - Total: 1,929
- Time zone: UTC−3 (BRT)

Ivorá is a Brazilian municipality in the state of Rio Grande do Sul. According to the 2022 census by the Brazilian Institute of Geography and Statistics (IBGE), the municipality has a population of 1.929 inhabitants.

== History ==
The municipality of Ivorá was established on May 9, 1988, when it separated from the municipality of Júlio de Castilhos. However, its history began in May 1883 when José Manoel de Siqueira Couto, the director of the Silveira Martins Colony, started measuring colonial lots to be allocated to Italian immigrants camped there.

=== Italian Colonization ===
Due to political and economic issues in Italy combined with Brazil's need for labor, especially in the latter half of the 19th century, there was a significant wave of Italian immigration to Brazil. In Rio Grande do Sul, Italians started arriving in 1870, settling in four immigration colonies. The first two colonies, Conde D'Eu and Dona Isabel, were established in 1870, now known as the municipalities of Garibaldi and Bento Gonçalves, respectively. The third colony, Caxias, was founded in 1875 and is now the municipality of Caxias do Sul. The fourth colony, Silveira Martins, was established in 1876 by the Imperial Government and has been occupied by Italian immigrants from 1877 onwards, including what is now Ivorá among several municipalities of the Fourth Colony of Italian Immigration.

=== Municipal Formation ===
Ivorá, colonized in 1883 by immigrants from the current Italian regions of Veneto and Friuli-Venezia Giulia, was initially named Núcleo Norte. On May 10, 1883, José de Siqueira Couto began dividing the land, and by September 25, 1883, the first Italian colonist, Valentino Zancan, settled there. In 1884, urban lots were also divided, and the area was initially called São José de Núcleo Norte. Later, it was renamed Nova Údine in honor of the Italian city of Udine. On January 1, 1939, it was renamed Ivorá, an indigenous word meaning "Beautiful Beach River," due to Brazil's participation in World War II against Italy. In 2018, Talian was approved as a co-official language alongside Portuguese.

== Geography ==
Ivorá is located in the Serra de São Martinho, at a latitude of 29°31'13" south and a longitude of 53°34'50" west, at an altitude of 120 meters. It lies in the central region of Rio Grande do Sul, within the area known as the Fourth Italian Immigration Colony. This region also includes municipalities like Silveira Martins, São João do Polêsine, Faxinal do Soturno, Dona Francisca, Nova Palma, and Pinhal Grande. The municipal seat is situated in a transitional area between the central depression and the plateau.

== See also ==
- List of municipalities in Rio Grande do Sul
