= Sete de Setembro, Rio Grande do Sul =

Municipality in Rio Grande do Sul, Brazil

Coordinates: 28°07′51″S 54°27′46″W

- Municipality
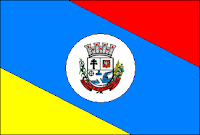
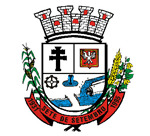
- Flag Coat of arms
- Interactive map of Sete de Setembro, Rio Grande do Sul
- Country: Brazil
- Time zone: UTC−3 (BRT)

Sete de Setembro is a municipality in the state of Rio Grande do Sul, Brazil. As of 2020, the estimated population was 1,950.

== See also ==
- List of municipalities in Rio Grande do Sul
