= Vista Alegre do Prata =

Municipality of Rio Grande do Sul, Brazil

- Municipality
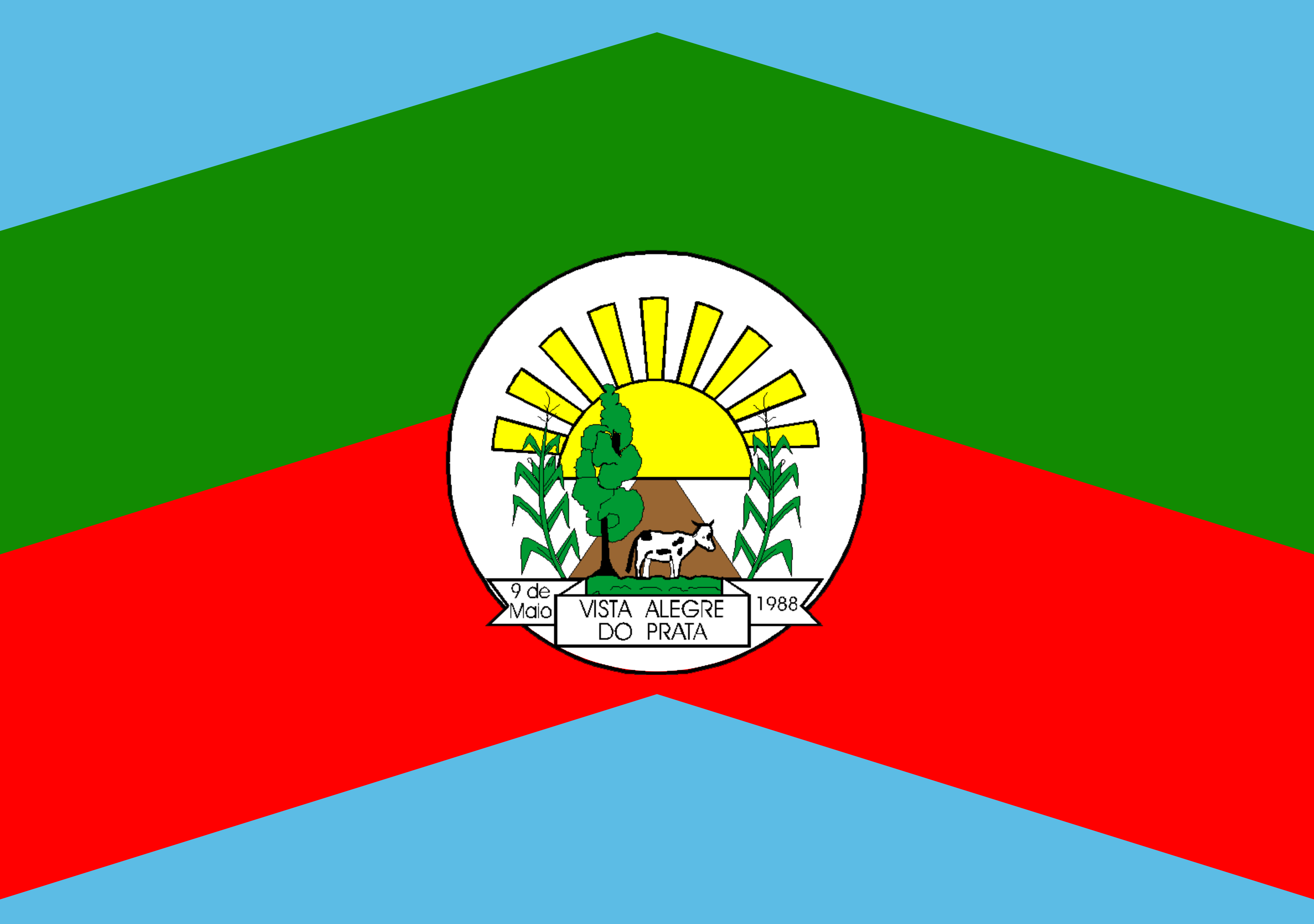
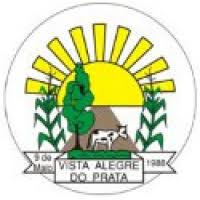
- Flag Coat of arms

- Location in Rio Grande do Sul state

- Location in Brazil
- Coordinates: 28°48′31″S 51°47′25″W
- Country: Brazil
- Region: South
- State: Rio Grande do Sul
- Mesoregion: Nordeste Rio-grandense
- Microregion: Guaporé

Area
  - Total: 119.33 km^{2} (46.07 sq mi)
- Elevation: 562 m (1,844 ft)

Population (2020)
  - Total: 1,557
  - Density: 13.05/km^{2} (33.79/sq mi)
- Time zone: UTC−3 (BRT)
- Postal code: 95325-xxx
- Website: www.vistaalegredoprata.rs.gov.br

Vista Alegre do Prata (lit. Joyous View of Silver) is a municipality of the northeastern part of the state of Rio Grande do Sul, Brazil. The population is 1,557 (2020 est.) in an area of 119.33 km^{2}. Its elevation is 562 m.

== See also ==
- List of municipalities in Rio Grande do Sul
