= São Jorge, Rio Grande do Sul =

Municipality in Rio Grande do Sul, Brazil

Coordinates: 28°29′56″S 51°42′10″W

- Municipality
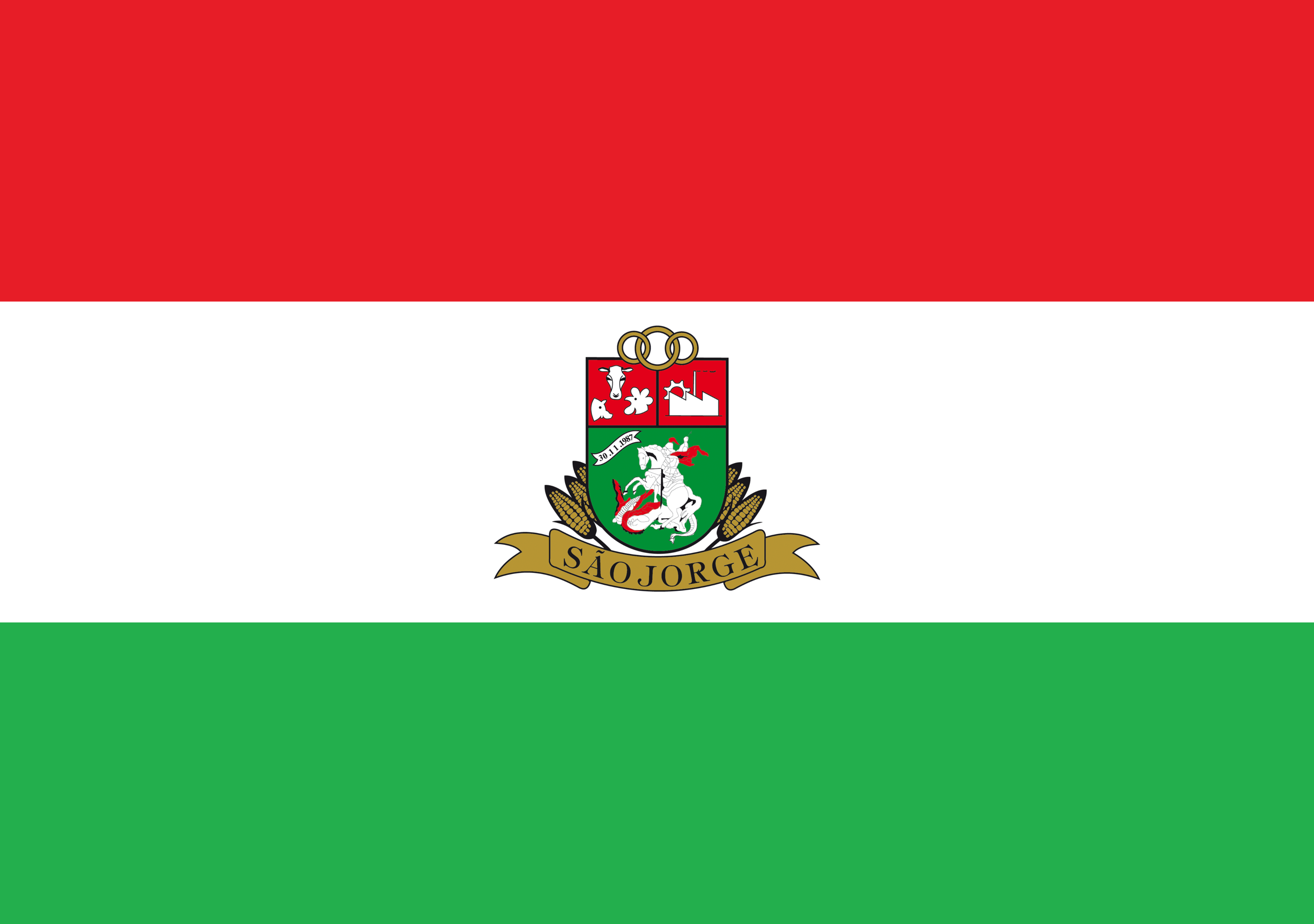
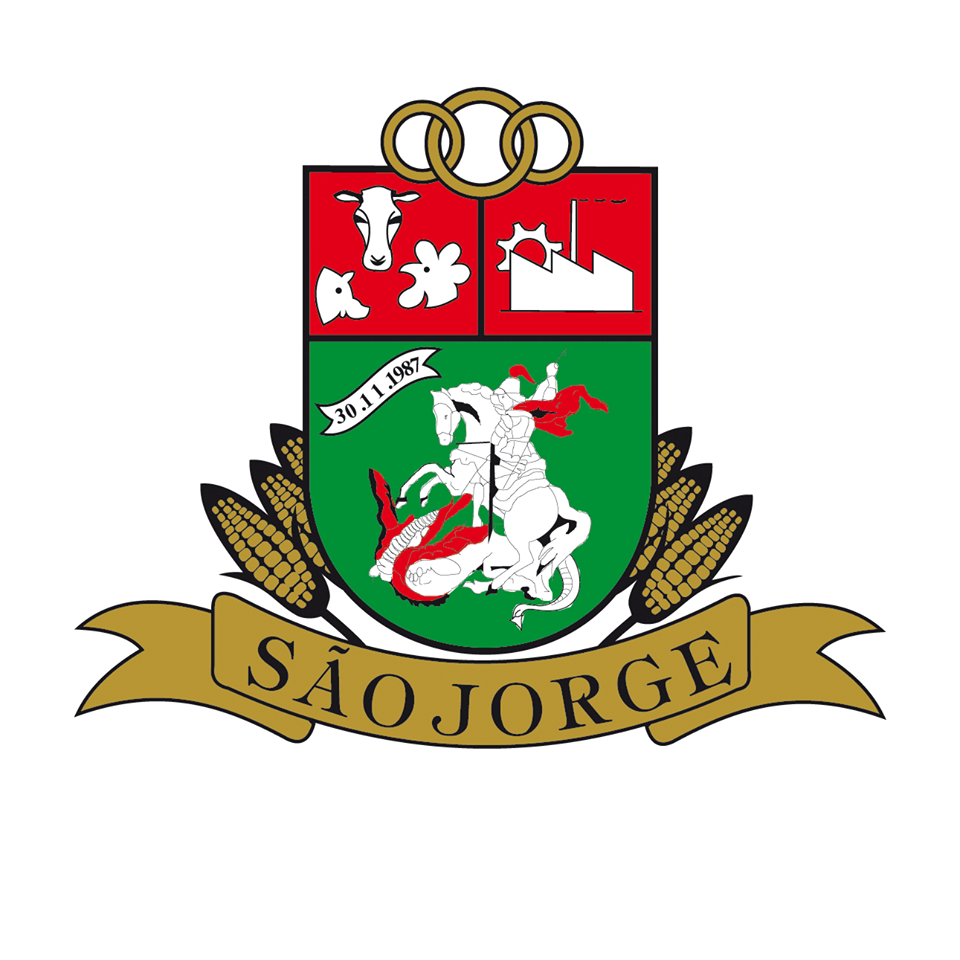
- Flag Coat of arms
- Interactive map of São Jorge, Rio Grande do Sul
- Country: Brazil
- Time zone: UTC−3 (BRT)

São Jorge is a municipality in the state of Rio Grande do Sul, Brazil. As of 2020, the estimated population was 2,816.

== See also ==
- List of municipalities in Rio Grande do Sul
