= Ipumirim =

Coordinates: 27°05′S 52°08′W

- Municipality
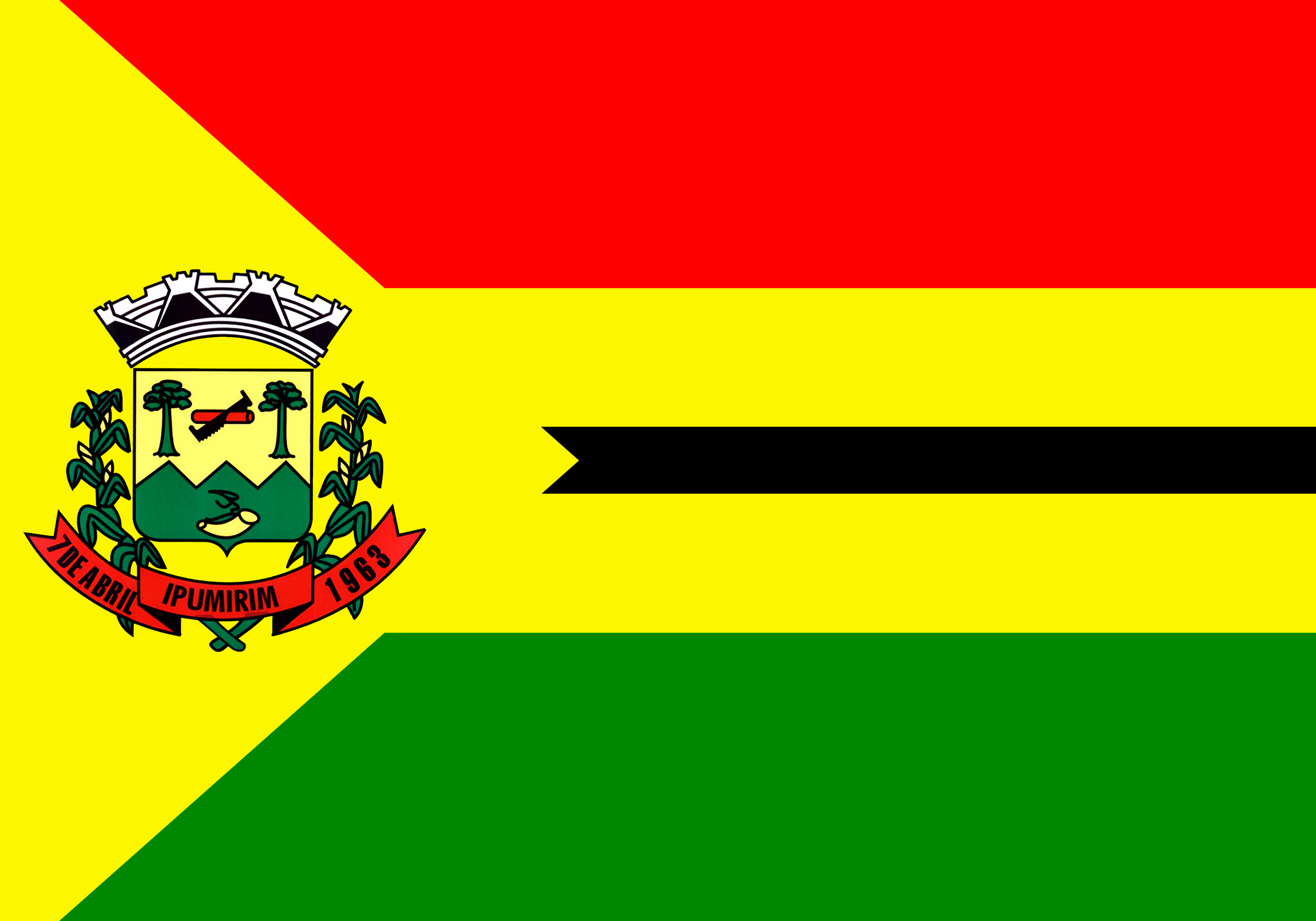
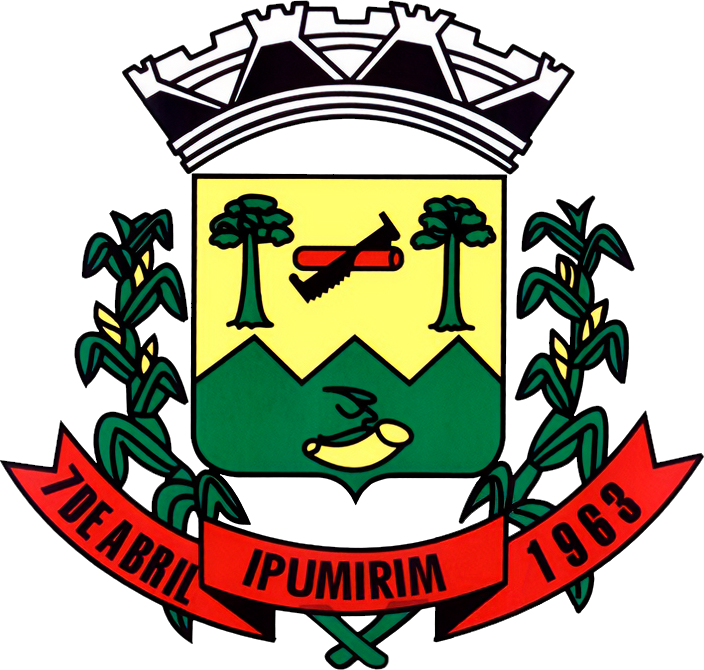
- Flag Coat of arms
- Interactive map of Ipumirim
- Country: Brazil
- Region: South
- State: Santa Catarina
- Mesoregion: Oeste Catarinense

Population (2020)
  - Total: 7,620
- Time zone: UTC -3
- Website: www.ipumirim.sc.gov.br

Ipumirim is a municipality in the state of Santa Catarina in the South region of Brazil.

== See also ==
- List of municipalities in Santa Catarina
