= Vila Maria, Rio Grande do Sul =

Municipality of Rio Grande do Sul, Brazil

Coordinates: 28.5350°S 52.1539°W

Vila Maria
- Municipality
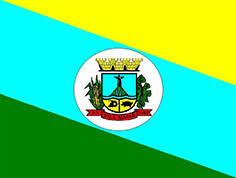
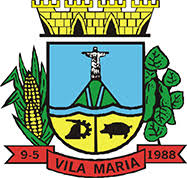
- Flag Coat of arms

- Location in Brazil
- Country: Brazil
- Region: Southern
- State: Rio Grande do Sul
- Mesoregion: Noroeste Rio-Grandense

Population (2020)
  - Total: 4,363
- Time zone: UTC−3 (BRT)

Vila Maria is a municipality in the state of Rio Grande do Sul in the Southern Region of Brazil.

== See also ==
- List of municipalities in Rio Grande do Sul
