= Camargo, Rio Grande do Sul =

Municipality in Rio Grande do Sul, Brazil

Coordinates: 28°35′13″S 52°12′07″W

- Municipality
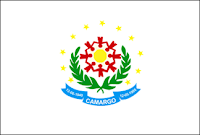
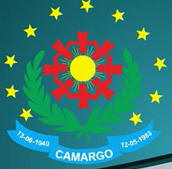
- Flag Coat of arms
- Interactive map of Camargo, Rio Grande do Sul
- Country: Brazil
- Time zone: UTC−3 (BRT)

Camargo is a municipality in the state of Rio Grande do Sul, Brazil.

The population in 2020 was 2,742, in a land area of 138.1 square kilometres (53.3 sq mi).

== History ==
The early European migrants here arrived in the region around Marau from the Antônio Prado region, but their earlier European origins were in Italy. The area was one of Plainplains interspersed with low hills and bordering a river, was at the time inhabited by Caboclo people. The river was called the Camargo, and that is the name that was adopted for the European settlement.

By the early twentieth century, the Italian immigrants had imported the customs and habits of their ancestral homes, and the settlement was being laid out and organized along traditional Italian lines.

== See also ==
- List of municipalities in Rio Grande do Sul
