= Putinga =

Municipality in Rio Grande do Sul, Brazil

Coordinates: 29°00′S 52°09′W

- Municipality
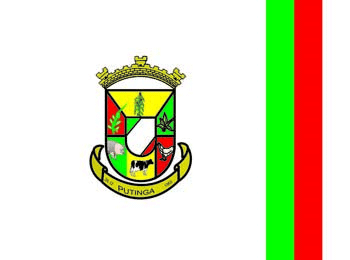
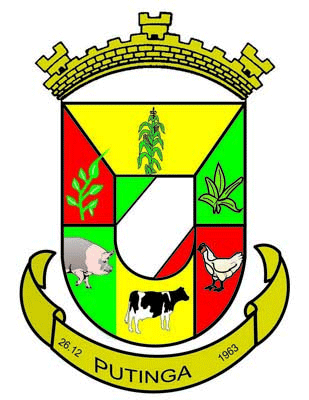
- Flag Coat of arms
- Interactive map of Putinga
- Country: Brazil
- Time zone: UTC−3 (BRT)

Putinga is a municipality in the state of Rio Grande do Sul, Brazil. As of 2020, the estimated population was 3,889.

== See also ==
- List of municipalities in Rio Grande do Sul
