= Gentil, Rio Grande do Sul =

Municipality in Brazil

Coordinates: 28°25′48″S 52°02′09″W

- Municipality
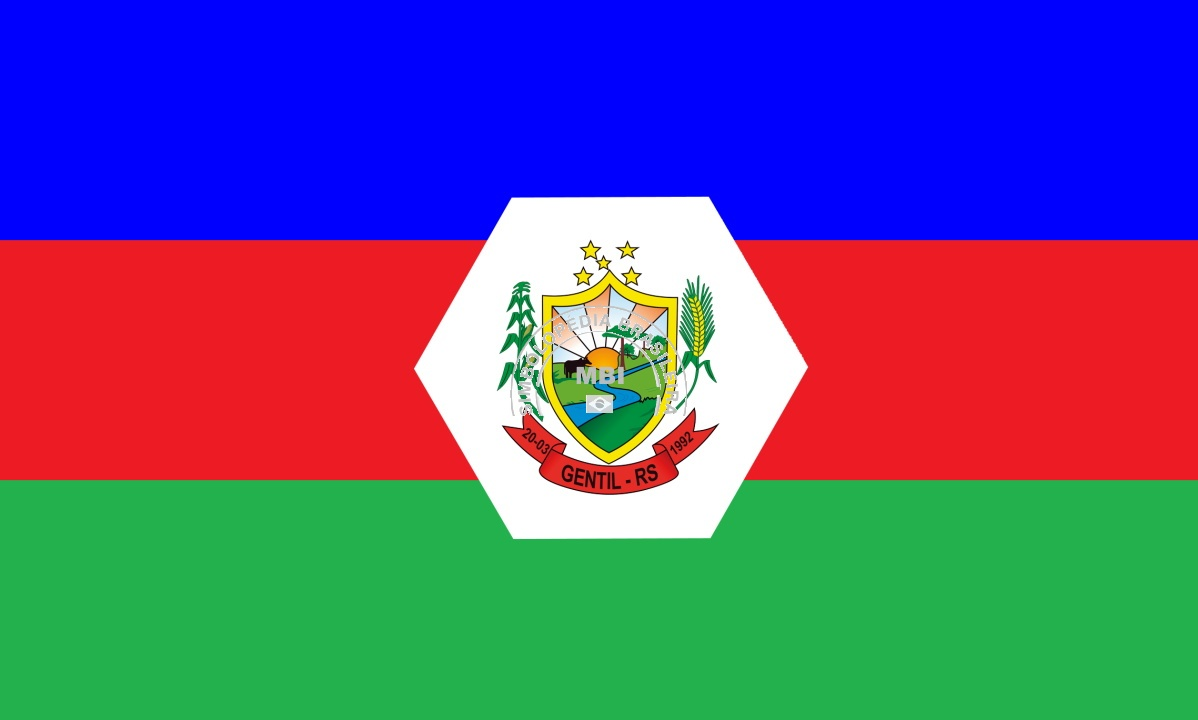
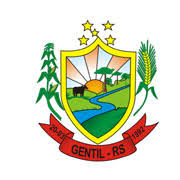
- Flag Coat of arms
- Interactive map of Gentil, Rio Grande do Sul
- Country: Brazil
- Time zone: UTC−3 (BRT)

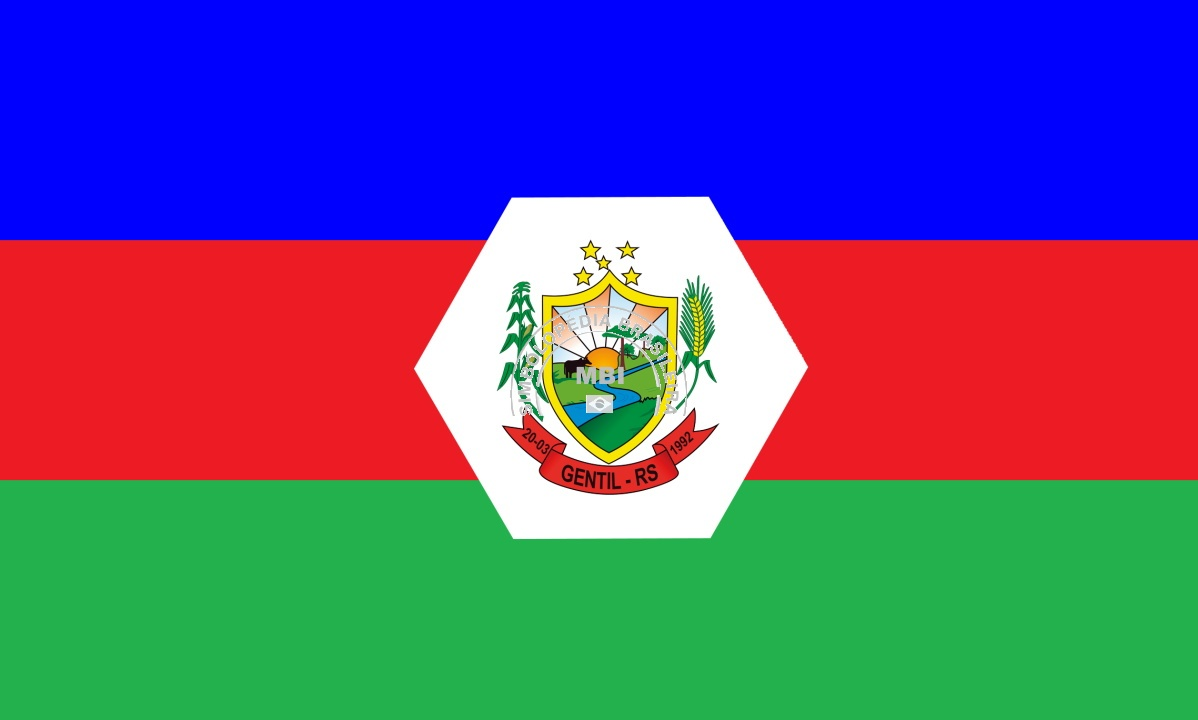
Flag of Gentil, Rio Grande do Sul

Gentil, Rio Grande do Sul is a municipality in the state of Rio Grande do Sul, Brazil. As of 2020, the estimated population was 1,626.

== See also ==
- List of municipalities in Rio Grande do Sul
