= Nova Erechim =

Coordinates: 26.9025°S 52.9058°W

- Municipality
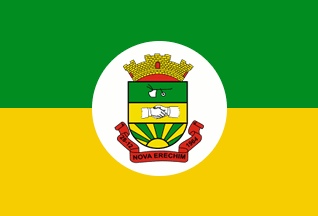
- Flag Coat of arms
- Interactive map of Nova Erechim
- Country: Brazil
- Region: South
- State: Santa Catarina
- Mesoregion: Oeste Catarinense

Population (2020)
  - Total: 5,092
- Time zone: UTC -3

Nova Erechim is a municipality in the state of Santa Catarina in the South region of Brazil. It was created in 1964, its area being taken from the existing municipality of Saudades.

== See also ==
- List of municipalities in Santa Catarina
