= Pinto Bandeira =

Municipality of Rio Grande do Sul, Brazil

- Municipality
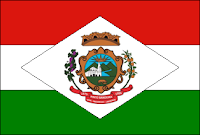
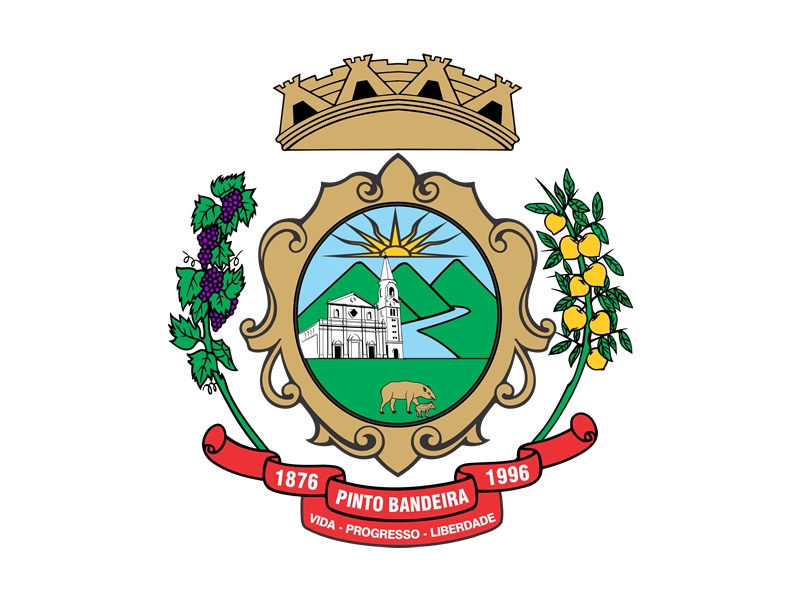
- Flag Coat of arms

- Location in Brazil
- Coordinates: 29°5′52″S 51°27′1″W
- Country: Brazil
- Region: South
- State: Rio Grande do Sul

Area
  - Total: 105 km^{2} (41 sq mi)

Population (2020)
  - Total: 3,036
  - Density: 28.9/km^{2} (74.9/sq mi)
- Time zone: UTC−3 (BRT)

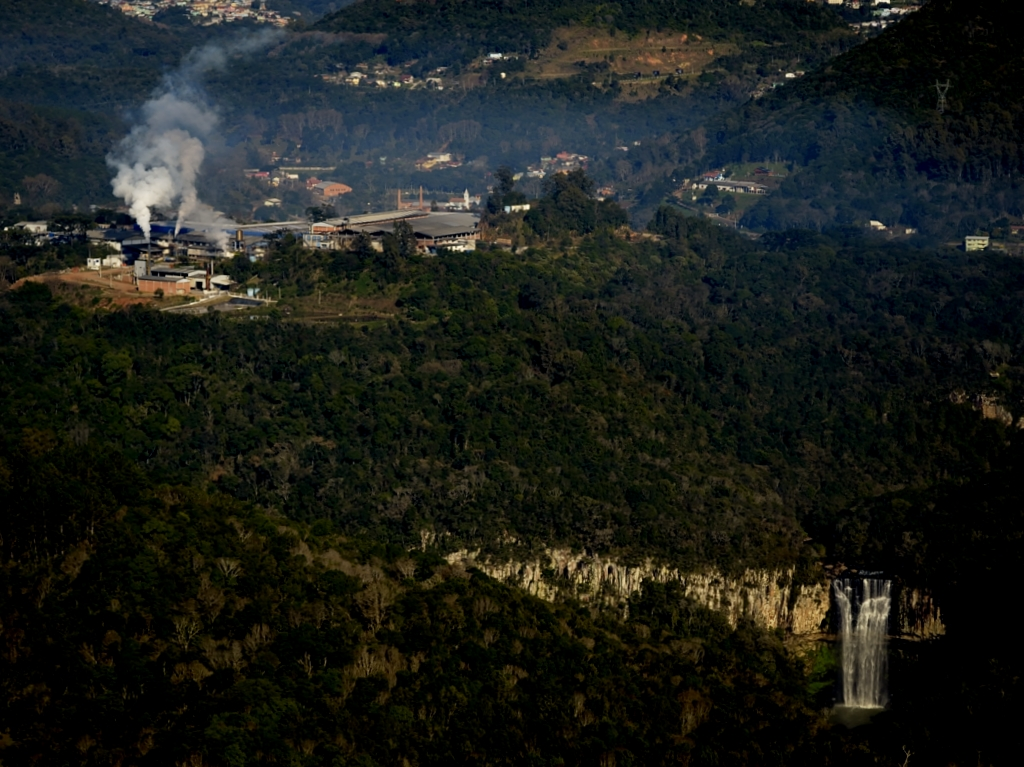
Pinto Bandeira - RS, Brazil

Pinto Bandeira is a municipality in the state of Rio Grande do Sul, Brazil. Its population was 3,036 (2020) and its area is 105 km^{2}. The municipality was established in January 2013.

== See also ==
- List of municipalities in Rio Grande do Sul
