= União da Serra =

Municipality in Rio Grande do Sul, Brazil

Coordinates: 28°47′42″S 52°02′13″W

- Municipality
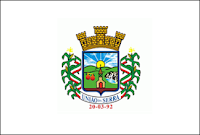
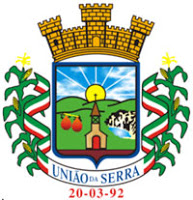
- Flag Coat of arms
- Interactive map of União da Serra
- Country: Brazil
- Time zone: UTC−3 (BRT)

União da Serra is a municipality in the state of Rio Grande do Sul, Brazil. As of 2020, the estimated population was 1,118.

== See also ==
- List of municipalities in Rio Grande do Sul
