= Paraí =

Municipality in Rio Grande do Sul, Brazil

Coordinates: 28°35′38″S 51°47′09″W

- Municipality
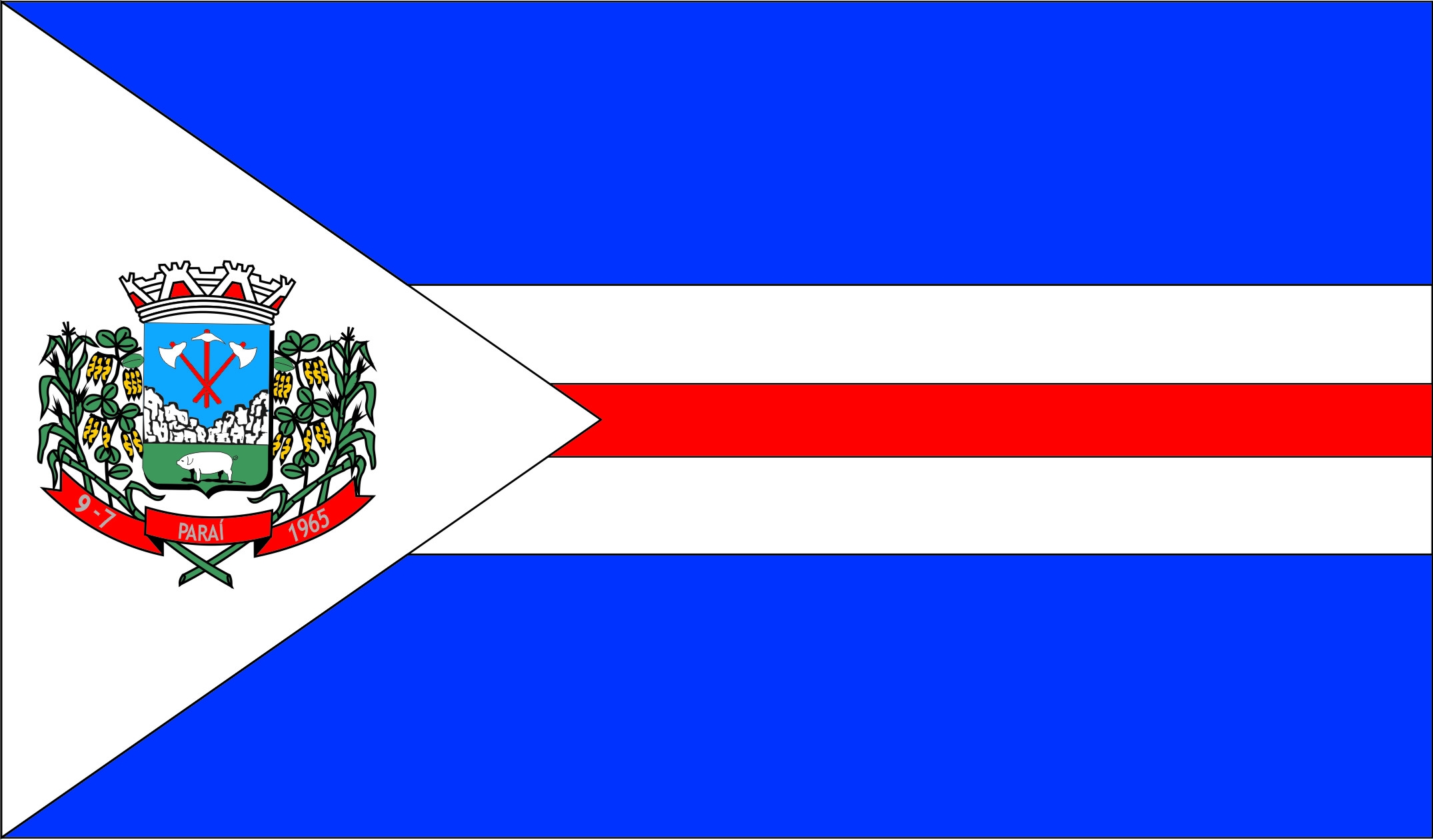
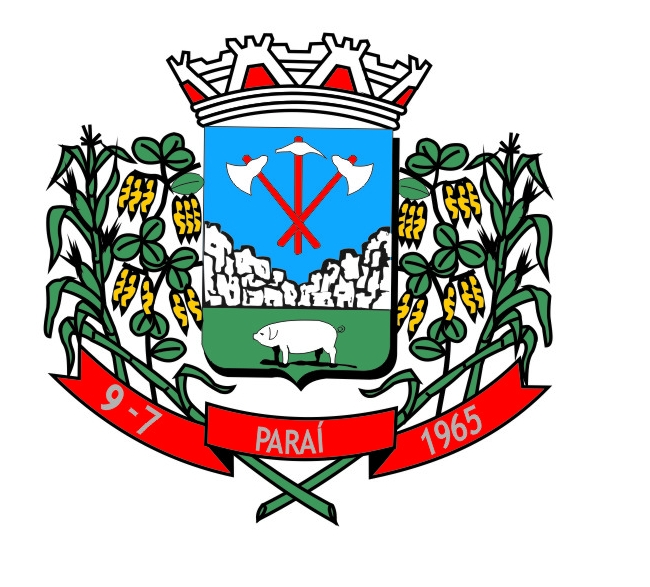
- Flag Coat of arms
- Interactive map of Paraí
- Country: Brazil
- Time zone: UTC−3 (BRT)

Paraí is a municipality in the state of Rio Grande do Sul, Brazil. As of 2020, the estimated population was 7,727.

== See also ==
- List of municipalities in Rio Grande do Sul
