= Miss Rio Grande do Sul =

Beauty contest

Miss Universe Rio Grande do Sul
- Formation: 1954
- Type: Beauty pageant
- Headquarters: Rio Grande do Sul, Brazil
- Members: Miss Brazil
- Official language: Portuguese
- State Director: Eleonara Oliveira

Miss Universe Rio Grande do Sul is a Brazilian Beauty pageant which selects the representative for the State of Rio Grande do Sul at the Miss Brazil contest, for Miss Universe franchise. The pageant was created in 1954 and has been held every year since with the exception of 1990, 1993, and 2020. The pageant is held annually with representation of several municipalities. Since 2026, Eleonara Oliveira has been the state director of Miss Rio Grande do Sul. Rio Grande do Sul is the state with the most crowns in the national contest and also the state that produced the first Miss Brazil to win the Miss Universe contest, Iêda Maria Vargas of Porto Alegre.

== Gallery of Titleholders ==
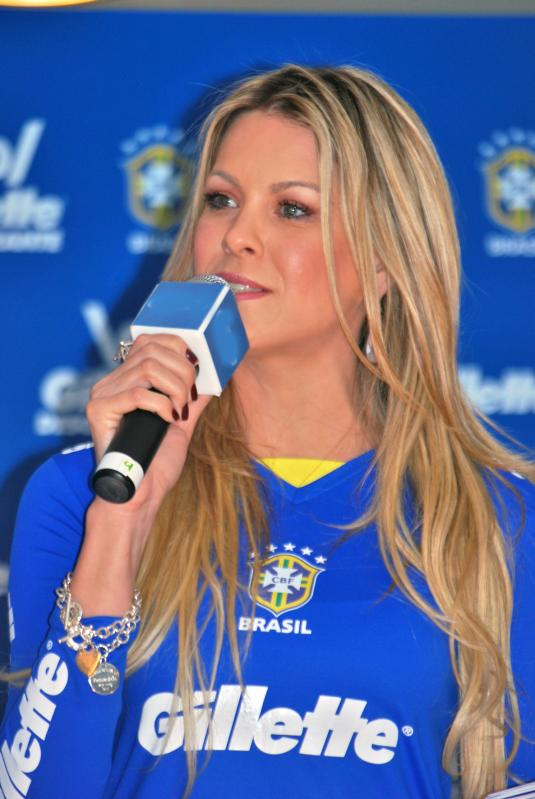
Miss Rio Grande do Sul 1999
Renata Fan

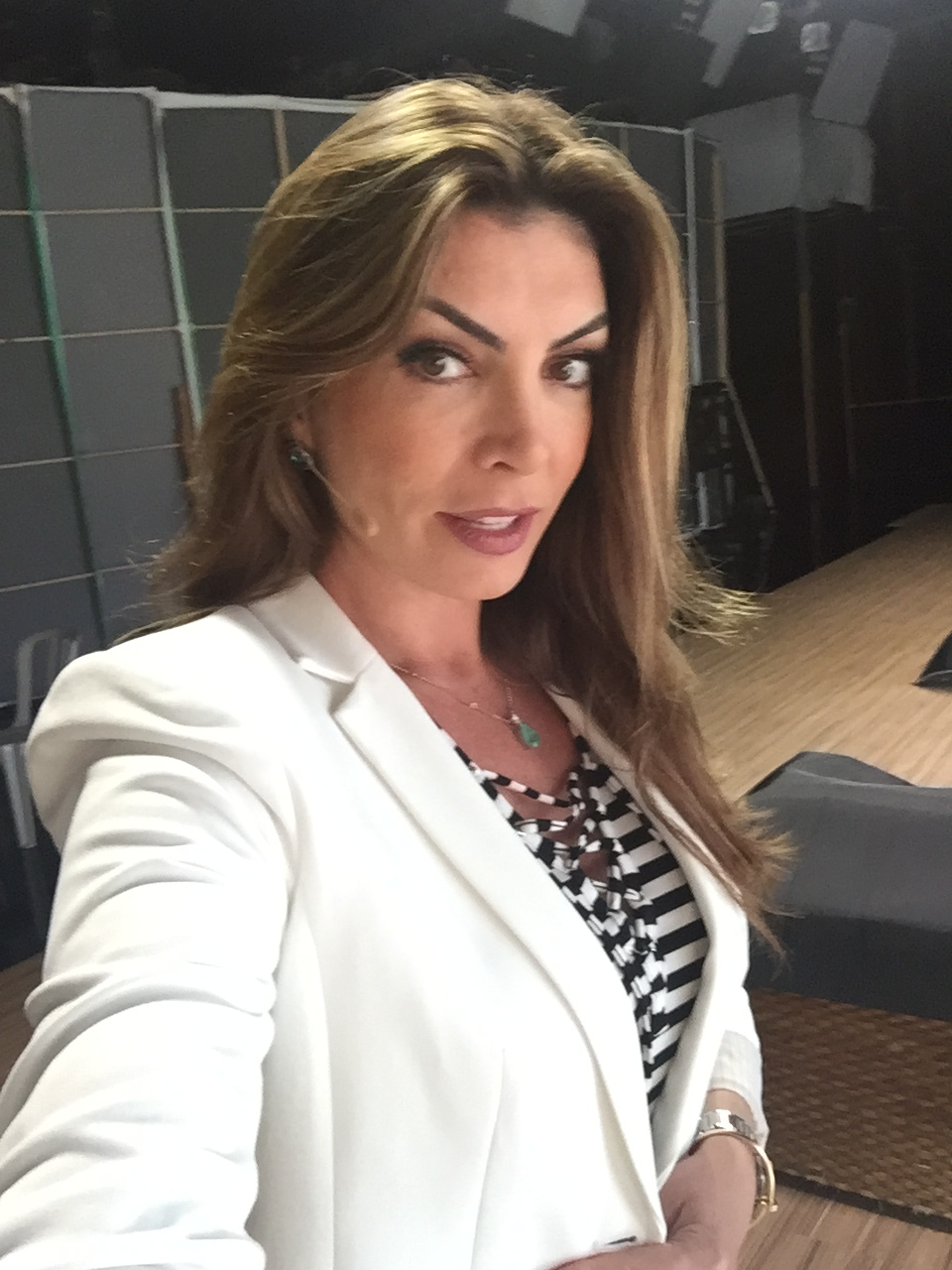
Miss Rio Grande do Sul 1993
Leila Schuster

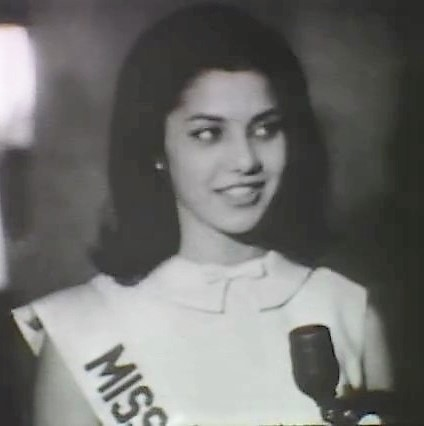
Miss Rio Grande do Sul 1963
Iêda Vargas

== Results summary ==
=== Placements ===
Placement	Times
Miss Brazil	15
1st runner-up	7
2nd runner-up	8
3rd runner-up	4
4th runner-up	5
Finalist	1
Semifinalist	21
Total	61
Participation	72/72
Overall performance	85%

=== Special awards ===
- Miss Congeniality: Vera Brauner (1961); Elizabeth Horst (1976).
- Miss Photogenic: Renata Fan (1999).
- Miss Popular Vote: Fabiane Niclotti (2004).
- Best State Costume: Iêda Vargas (1963).
- Best Social Project: Júlia Guerra (2026).

=== State Directors ===
- 1996 to 2012: Evandro Hazzy.
- 2013 to 2016: Carlos Totti.
- 2017 to 2022: Marcelo Sóes.
- 2023 to 2024: Bebeto Azevêdo.
- 2025 to 2026: Paulo Linhares.

== Titleholders ==
Year	Name	Age (Note: Ages at the time of the pageant)	Represented	Miss Brazil placement	Notes
2026	Júlia Guerra	35	Soledade	Top 12	Miss América Latina del Mundo 2013.
2025	Aline Fritsch	26	Lagoão	1st runner-up	
2024	Eduarda Dallagnol	25	Novo Hamburgo	Top 07	
2023	Maria Brechane	19	Rio Grande	Miss Brazil 2023	Unplaced at Miss Universe 2023.
2022	Alina Furtado	27	Piratini	4th runner-up	Miss Rio Grande do Sul World 2021 and 1st runner-up at Miss Brazil World 2021. 2nd runner-up at Miss Rio Grande do Sul 2017.
2021	Suellyn Scheffer	25	Montenegro	Top 15	
2020	Julia Gama	27	Porto Alegre	Miss Brazil 2020	1st runner-up at Miss Universe 2020. Appointed as Miss Brazil due to the COVID-19 pandemic. Miss Brazil World 2014 and Top 11 at Miss World 2014. Former La casa de los famosos season 2 and season 5.
2019	Bianca Scheren	20	Estrela	Top 05	1st runner-up at last year contest.
2018	Leonora Weimer	24	Eldorado do Sul	Top 15	Garota Verão 2011.
2017	Juliana Mueller	25	Terra de Areia	1st runner-up	Garota Verão 2009.
2016	Letícia Borghetti	22	Tapera	Top 10	3rd runner-up at Miss Rio Grande do Sul 2014.
2015	Marthina Brandt	23	Bom Princípio	Miss Brazil 2015	Top 15 at Miss Universe 2015. Unplaced at Miss Rio Grande do Sul 2012. Won the Miss Germany Brazil 2010 local pageant.
2014	Marina Helms	23	São Lourenço do Sul	Top 10	
2013	Vitória Sulczinski	21	Passo Fundo	Top 10	
2012	Gabriela Markus	24	Teutônia	Miss Brazil 2012	4th runner-up at Miss Universe 2012. 4th runner-up at Best National Costume round. 1st runner-up at Miss Rio Grande do Sul 2010.
2011	Priscila Machado	25	Farroupilha	Miss Brazil 2011	2nd runner-up at Miss Universe 2011. 3rd runner-up at Miss Rio Grande do Sul 2010. Top 08 at Miss Rio de Janeiro 2010. Top 15 at Miss Rio Grande do Sul 2008.
2010	Bruna Jaroceski	20	Canoas	Top 10	Brazil at Miss Intercontinental 2010.
2009	Bruna Felisberto	22	Xangri-lá	Top 10	
2008	Natálya Anderle	21	Encantado	Miss Brazil 2008	Unplaced at Miss Universe 2008.
2007	Carolina Prates	22	Alegrete	1st runner-up	Unplaced at Miss International 2007.
2006	Rafaela Zanella	19	Santa Maria	Miss Brazil 2006	Top 20 at Miss Universe 2006.
2005	Eunice Pratti	23	Pelotas	Top 10	
2004	Fabiane Niclotti	19	Gramado	Miss Brazil 2004	Also won Miss Popular Vote during the nationals. Unplaced at Miss Universe 2004. Died at the age of 31.
2003	Juliana Lopes	20	Santa Maria	Top 10	
2002	Joseane Oliveira	20	Esteio	Dethroned	Unplaced at Miss Universe 2002. Later dethroned after it was discovered that she was married.
2001	Juliana Borges	22	Santa Maria	Miss Brazil 2001	Unplaced at Miss Universe 2001.
2000	Fernanda Schiavo		Ijuí	2nd runner-up	Unplaced at Miss International 2000.
1999	Renata Fan	21	Santo Ângelo	Miss Brazil 1999	Also won Miss Photogenic. Unplaced at Miss Universe 1999. World Miss University 2000.
1998	Luize Altenhofen	18	Capão da Canoa	2nd runner-up	Withdrew at Miss International 1998.
1997	Aline Riquinho		Porto Alegre		
1996	Karine Baüer		Santo Ângelo	Top 12	
1995	Angélica Soares		Porto Alegre		
1994	Tatiane Possebom		Canoas	Top 12	Brazil at Reina Sudamericana 1994. Brazil at Miss Intercontinental 1995.
1993	Leila Schüster	18	Cachoeirinha	Miss Brazil 1993	Appointed as Miss Brazil 1993. Top 10 at Miss Universe 1993. Brazil at Reinado Internacional del Café 1991.
1992	Juliana Wülfing		Estrela	Top 12	
1991	Gisselle Wëber		Porto Alegre	1st runner-up	There were two representatives sent in 1991.
1991	Cátia Kupssinskü		São Leopoldo	2nd runner-up	There were two representatives sent in 1991.
1990	No contest in 1990.				
1989	Ceres Sessim		SOGIPA	2nd runner-up	1st runner-up at Miss Brasil Beleza Internacional 1990.
1988	Denise Schmitz		Partenon Tênis Clube	Top 12	
1987	Cláudia Alves Jardim		Floresta	3rd runner-up	
1986	Deise Nunes	18	Canela	Miss Brazil 1986	Top 10 at Miss Universe 1986 (first ever black woman Miss Brasil). 2nd runner-up at Reina Sudamericana 1986.
1985	Andréa Zambrano		Sport Club Internacional	4th runner-up	
1984	Christianne Wellausen		Sport Club Internacional	4th runner-up	
1983	Rejane Hëiden		Grêmio Porto Alegrense	2nd runner-up	3rd runner-up at Miss Intercontinental 1983.
1982	Patrícia Silveira		Porto Alegre	Top 12	
1981	Isabel Domenëch		Porto Alegre		
1980	Adriana Zselinsky		Porto Alegre	3rd runner-up	
1979	Marlene Petterle		Pinheiro Machado	Top 12	
1978	Sílvia Porciúncula		Jaguarão	Top 10	
1977	Madalena Sbaraini		Porto Alegre	1st runner-up	3rd runner-up at Miss World 1977.
1976	Anne Lee Horst		Estrela	Top 08	Also won Miss Congeniality.
1975	Jane Bezerra		Porto Alegre		
1974	Janeta Hoeveler		Porto Alegre	1st runner-up	Originally 1st runner-up, later assumed the title after winner resigned. Unplaced at Miss International 1974.
1973	Denise Cezimbra		Porto Alegre	3rd runner-up	
1972	Rejane Vieira Costa	17	Pelotas	Miss Brazil 1972	1st runner-up at Miss Universe 1972. Became an actress in Brazil, under the name Rejane Goulart.
1971	Alice Corrêa Rezende		Bagé		
1970	Bernadete Heemann		Lajeado	3rd runner-up	Top15 at Miss International 1971
1969	Ana Cristina Rodrigues		Caxias do Sul	2nd runner-up	Unplaced at Miss World 1969.
1968	Elizabeth Finardi		Passo Fundo		
1967	Terezinha Wëiss		São Borja		
1966	Clara Gröhmann		Porto Alegre	Top 08	
1965	Tânia Maria Lupi		Porto Alegre		
1964	Rosa Maria Gallas		Montenegro	Top 09	
1963	Iêda Maria Vargas	18	Porto Alegre	Miss Brazil 1963	Also won Best State Costume. Later won Miss Universe 1963.
1962	Eva Arismende		Jaguarão	4th runner-up	
1961	Vera Brauner		Pelotas	1st runner-up	Originally 1st runner-up, later assumed the title after Staël resigned. 1st runner-up at Miss International 1961.
1960	Edda Logges		Pelotas	4th runner-up	
1959	Otília Rodrigues		Guaíba		
1958	Tânia Oliveira		Pelotas		
1957	Sandra Hervé		Porto Alegre	2nd runner-up	
1956	Maria José Cardoso	21	Porto Alegre	Miss Brazil 1956	Born in Santa Catarina state. Top 15 at Miss Universe 1956.
1955	Rosa Alamon		Bagé		
1954	Lígia Carotenuto		Porto Alegre	2nd Runner-Up	Originally 1st runner-up, later assumed the title after Cladis resigned.
1954	Cládis Caruccio		Pelotas	Did not compete	Relinquished the title for unknown reasons.
