= Barão =

Municipality of Rio Grande do Sul, Brazil

- Municipality
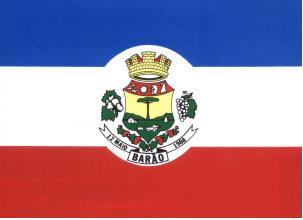
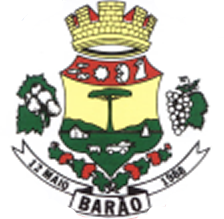
- Flag Coat of arms

- Coordinates: 29°22′37″S 51°29′45″W
- Country: Brazil
- State: Rio Grande do Sul
- Mesoregion: Metropolitana de Porto Alegre
- Microregion: Montenegro IBGE/2008
- Founded: December 5, 1988

Government
  - Mayor: Claudio Ferrari (PT)

Area
  - Total: 124.497 km^{2} (48.069 sq mi)
- Elevation: 642 m (2,106 ft)

Population (2020)
  - Total: 6,202
  - Density: 49.82/km^{2} (129.0/sq mi)
- Time zone: UTC−3 (BRT)
- HDI: 0.807
- GDP: R$ 40,682,000
- GDP per capita: R$7,647.00

Barão is a municipality in the state of Rio Grande do Sul, Brazil. It includes the districts Arroio Canoas, Francesa Alta, General Neto and Francesa Baixa. Barão is 80 km from Porto Alegre. The municipality is bordered by Carlos Barbosa (north), São Vendelino (east), Bom Princípio (southeast), Tupandi (southeast), São Pedro da Serra (south), Salvador do Sul (southwest), Poço das Antas (southwest), and Boa Vista do Sul (northwest).

The residents are primarily of German Brazilian descent.

== See also ==
- List of municipalities in Rio Grande do Sul
