= Miss Bahia =

Brazilian beauty pageant

Miss Bahia Miss Universe Bahia
- Formation: 1954
- Type: Beauty pageant
- Headquarters: Bahia, Brazil
- Members: Miss Brazil
- Official language: Portuguese
- State Director: Juliana Alves

Miss Bahia is a Brazilian beauty pageant which selects the representative for the State of Bahia at the Miss Brazil contest. The pageant was created in 1954 and has been held every year since with the exception of 1990, 1993, and 2020. The pageant is held annually with representation of several municipalities. Since 2022, the State director of Miss Bahia is, Juliana Alves. Bahia has won three crowns in the national contest and also the state that produced the second and most recent Miss Brazil to win the Miss Universe contest, Martha Vasconcellos of Salvador.

The following women from who competed as Miss Bahia have won Miss Brazil:

- Marta Rocha, from Salvador, in 1954
- Olívia Rebouças Cavalcanti, from Itabuna, in 1962
- Marta Vasconcellos, from Salvador, in 1968

== Gallery of Titleholders ==
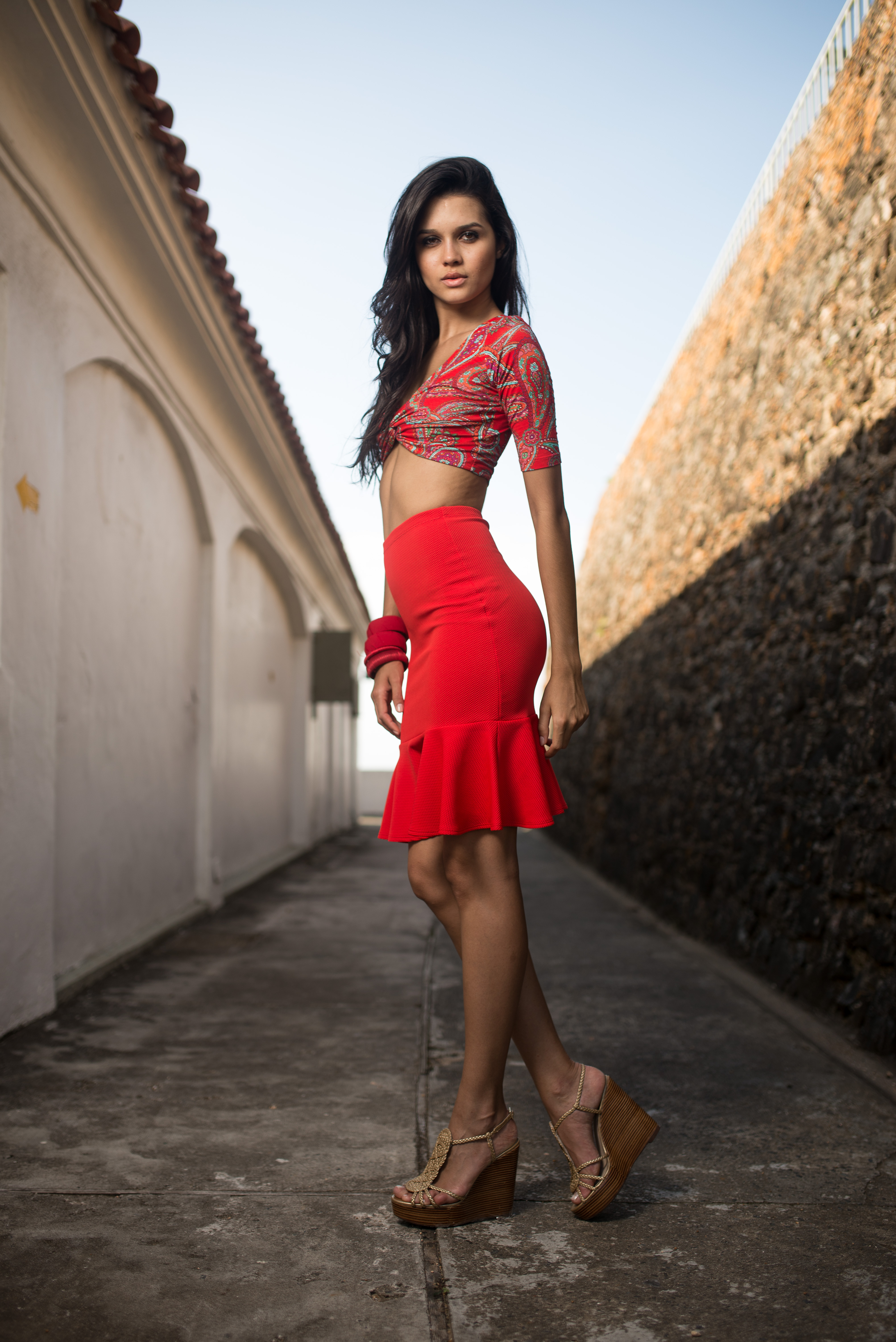
Miss Bahia 2014
Anne Lima

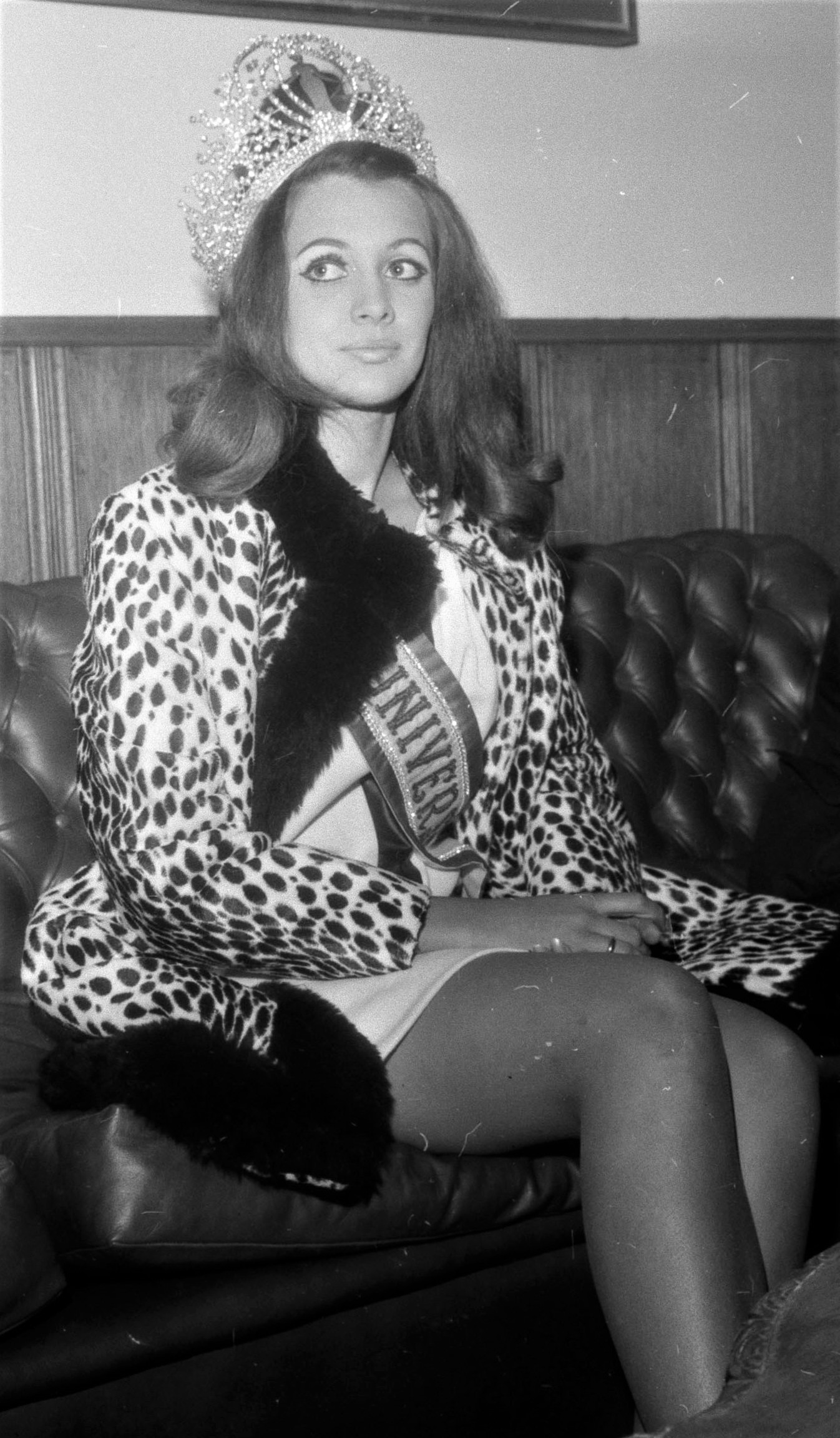
Miss Bahia 1968, Miss Brazil 1968, and Miss Universe 1968
Martha Vasconcellos

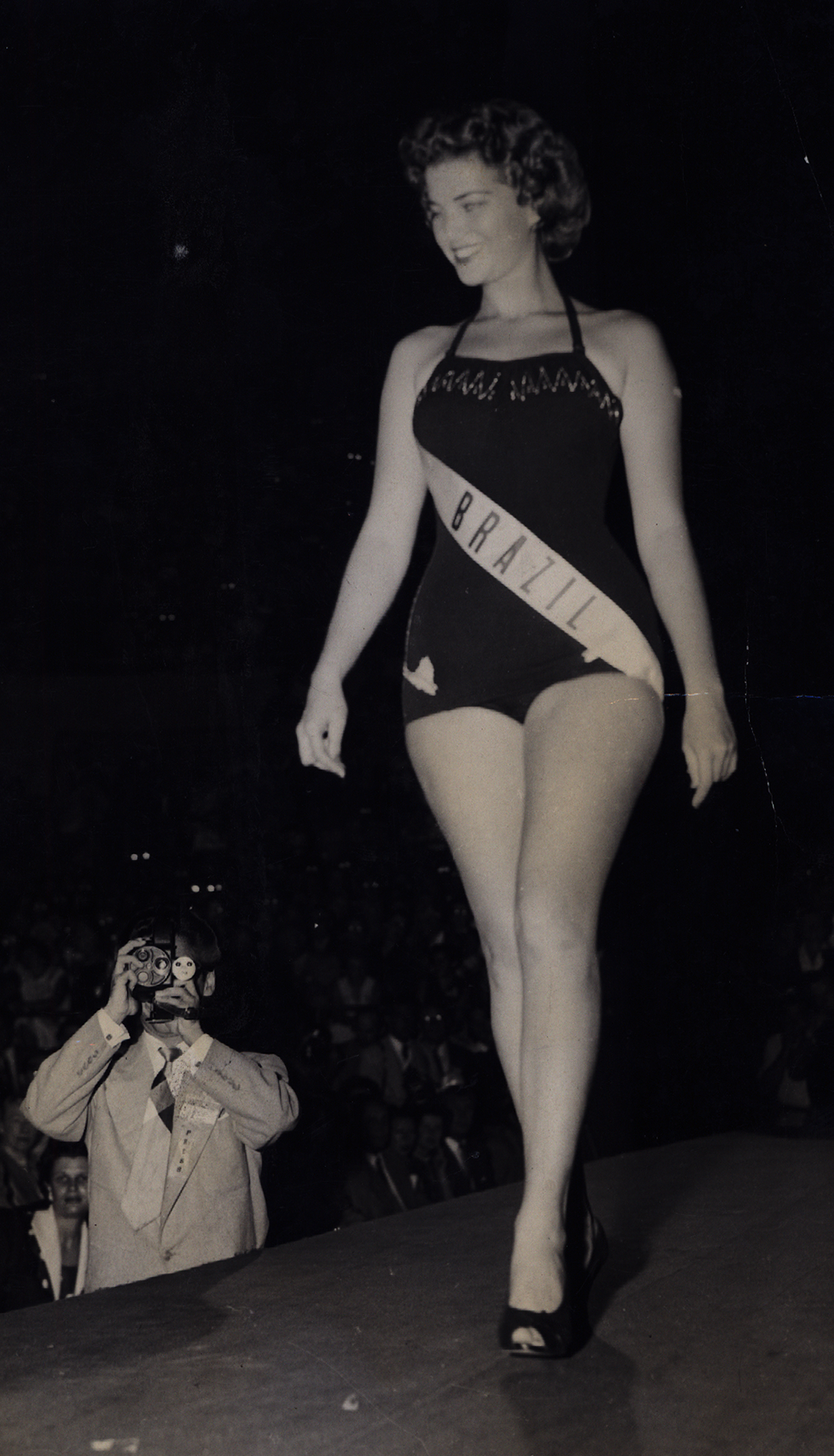
Miss Bahia 1954, and Miss Brazil 1954
Marta Rocha

== Results summary ==
=== Placements ===
- Miss Brazil: Martha Rocha (1954); Olívia Rebouças (1962); Martha Vasconcellos (1968)
- 1st Runner-Up: Laura Oliveira (1978); Vanessa Blumenfeld (1988); Vanessa Gabriella Rocha (2011); Maria Isabel Santos (2018)
- 2nd Runner-Up: Maria Manso Dias (1959); Zaída Costa (1975); Cristiane Andrade (1996); Priscila Santiago (2013)
- 3rd Runner-Up:
- 4th Runner-Up: Stella Rocha (1961); Jerusa Ribeiro (1977); Isacarla Petri (1994); Juliana Mendonça (2006)
- Top 5/Top 8/Top 9: Marilda Mascarenhas (1965); Ana Moreira (1970)
- Top 10/Top 11/Top 12: Geórgia Rejane Mendes (1979); Silvana Batista (1983); Ana Cristina Miranda (1984); Marisabel Böre (1985); Morgana Campos Brasil (1986); Cynara Fernandes (1987); Bianca Queiróz Rocha (1989); Nathalie Maria Duarte (1992); Jussana Moreira Sena (1998); Halina Francisca (2000); Oldeane Fonseca (2001); Bárbara Fernandes (2002); Karoline Araújo de Souza (2004); Danielle Abrantes (2005); Renata Marzolla Costa (2007); Paloma Garzedim Vega (2009); Patrícia Cristiane Guerra (2015); Amanda Malaquias Barreto (2022)
- Top 15/Top 16: Rafaela Santos (2010); Victoria Esteves (2016); Caroline Oliveira (2017); Tainara Costa (2021)

=== Special awards ===
- Miss Congeniality: Bianca Rocha (1989); Bárbara Fernandes (2002); Danielle Abrantes (2005)
- Miss Photogenic: Martha Vasconcellos (1968)

== Titleholders ==
Year	Name	Age (Note: Ages at the time of the pageant)	Height	Represented	Miss Brazil placement	Notes
Miss Universe Bahia
2023	Raíssa Dutra Rodrigues	22	1.68 m (5 ft 6 in)	Barra da Estiva		
2022	Amanda Malaquias Barreto	26	1.73 m (5 ft 8 in)	Ibipeba	Top 10	
2021	Tainara Bastos de Almeida Costa	25	1.75 m (5 ft 9 in)	Cruz das Almas	Top 15	
U Miss Bahia 2020 and Miss Bahia Be Emotion 2020
2020	No national Miss Brazil contest due to the COVID-19 pandemic and change in the national franchise holder which caused the national titleholder to be appointed.					
Miss Bahia Be Emotion
2019	Liliane Natiele Santos Silva	20	1.75 m (5 ft 9 in)	Feira de Santana		Last Miss Bahia Be Emotion
2018	Maria Isabel Santos	19	1.75 m (5 ft 9 in)	Salvador	1st Runner-Up	
2017	Caroline Oliveira Santos	24	1.75 m (5 ft 9 in)	Camaçari	Top 16	
2016	Victoria Esteves	18	1.72 m (5 ft 7 1/2 in)	Salvador	Top 15	Took over after the original winner was dethroned for being pregnant.
2016	Juliana Oliveira				Did not compete	After winning Miss Bahia (Be Emotion) 2016, Oliveira was later dethroned after it was revealed that she was pregnant.
2015	Patrícia Cristiane Guerra	21	1.72 m (5 ft 7 1/2 in)	Luís Eduardo Magalhães	Top 10	
Miss Bahia Universe
2014	Anne Lima de Souza	20	1.81 m (5 ft 11 1/2 in)	Caetité		
2013	Priscila Cidreira Santiago	20	1.74 m (5 ft 8 1/2 in)	Santa Cruz, Salvador	2nd Runner-Up	
2012	Bruna Diniz Gonçalves	21	1.80 m (5 ft 11 in)	Santaluz		
Miss Bahia
2011	Vanessa Gabriella Rocha	21		Simões Filho	1st Runner-Up; Miss Brazil International 2011	Top 15 at Miss International 2011.
2010	Rafaela Marques Santos			Paulo Afonso	Top 15	
2009	Paloma Garzedim Vega			Ass. Atlética da Bahia	Top 10	
2008	Daniele Valadão Pinto			Madre de Deus		
2007	Renata Marzolla Costa			Santaluz	Top 10	
2006	Juliana Pina Mendonça			Ilhéus	4th Runner-Up	
2005	Danielle Abrantes de Oliveira			Prado	Top 10	Also won Miss Congeniality.
2004	Karoline Araújo de Souza			Simões Filho	Top 10	
2003	Acássia Rodrigues Santana			Mucuri		
2002	Bárbara Fernandes Moreira			Simões Filho	Top 10	Also won Miss Congeniality.
2001	Oldeane Ribeiro da Fonseca			Santo Antônio de Jesus	Top 10	
2000	Halina Francisca dos Santos			Valença	Top 11	
1999	Carolina Magnavita Oliveira			Salvador		
1998	Jussana Moreira Sena			Alcobaça	Top 12	
1997	Maria da Conceição Oliveira					
1996	Cristiane Simões Andrade				2nd Runner-Up	
1995	Aletéia Neves de Almeida			Catu		
1994	Isacarla Maciel Petri			Salvador	4th Runner-Up	
1993	No delegate sent in 1993 due to Miss Brazil 1993 being appointed rather than having a contest.					
1992	Nathalie Maria Duarte			Lauro de Freitas	Top 12	
1991	Deborah dos Passos			Bloco Tiete Vips		
1990	No contest in 1990.					
1989	Bianca Queiróz Rocha			Jornal da Sociedade	Top 12	Also won Miss Congeniality.
1988	Vanessa Blumenfeld			Lauro de Freitas	1st Runner-Up	
1987	Cynara Peixoto Fernandes			Cajazeira Country Club	Top 12	
1986	Morgana Campos Brasil			Salvador		
1985	Marisabel Böre de Moraes			Feira de Santana	Top 12	
1984	Ana Cristina Malagutti Miranda				Top 12	
1983	Silvana Marback Magno Batista			Salvador	Top 12	
1982	Wagda Tiara dos Santos					
1981	Mônica Luiza de Oliveira Pinto			Feira de Santana		
1980	Ana Lúcia Bahia Costa Paixão			Feira de Santana		
1979	Geórgia Rejane Mendes de Andrade				Top 12	
1978	Laura Angélica de Oliveira Pereira				1st Runner-Up; Miss Brazil World 1978	Unplaced at Miss World 1978.
1977	Jerusa Maria Sena Ribeiro			Jequié	4th Runner-Up	
1976	Maria de Fátima Paranhos					
1975	Zaída de Souza Costa				2nd Runner-Up; Miss Brazil World 1975	Unplaced at Miss World 1975.
1974	Bárbara Maria Vaz					
1973	Maria Rúbia Costa			Yes English School		
1972	Maria Adélia Jaqueira			Ipiaú		
1971	Thelma Alaíde de Oliveira			Itabuna		
1970	Ana Lúcia Correia Moreira				Top 8	
1969	Lúcia dos Santos Guerreiro			Clube dos Bancários		
1968	Martha Vasconcellos	20	1.72 m (5 ft 7 1/2 in)	Salvador	Miss Brazil 1968	Also won Miss Photogenic. Later won Miss Universe 1968.
1967	Vera Lúcia Martinez da Mota					
1966	Florianel Costa Portela			Ilhéus		
1965	Marilda Mascarenhas			Cachoeira	Top 8	
1964	Elvira Falcão			Ass. Atlética da Bahia		
1963	Gerusa Sampaio da Silva			Ruy Barbosa		
1962	Olívia Rebouças	22	1.73 m (5 ft 8 in)	Clube Baiano de Tênis	Miss Brazil 1962	4th Runner-Up at Miss Universe 1962.
1961	Stella Maria Rocha Lima				4th Runner-Up	
1960	Eliana Miranda			Clube Baiano de Tênis		
1959	Maria Manso Dias			Salvador	2nd Runner-Up	
1958	Anna Maria Carvalho			Feira de Santana		
1957	Sônia Silva Rocha			Esporte Clube Vitória		
1956	Sônia Santiago Mamede			Esporte Clube Sírio		
1955	Maria Eunice Dias de Assis			Salvador		
1954	Maria Marta Hacker Rocha	17	1.70 m (5 ft 7 in)	Clube Baiano de Tênis	Miss Brazil 1954	1st Runner-Up at Miss Universe 1954.
