= Miss Paraná =

Brazilian Beauty pageant created in 1955

Miss Paraná Miss Universe Paraná
- Formation: 1955
- Type: Beauty pageant
- Headquarters: Paraná, Brazil
- Members: Miss Brazil
- Official language: Portuguese
- State Director: Edielder Godoy de Lima

Miss Paraná is a Brazilian Beauty pageant which selects the representative for the State of Paraná at the Miss Brazil contest. The pageant was created in 1955 and has been held every year since with the exception of 1990-1991, and 1993. The pageant is held annually with representation of several municipalities. Since 2024, the State director of Miss Paraná is, Edielder Godoy de Lima or known simply as Edy Godoy.

The following women from who competed as Miss Paraná have won Miss Brazil:

- Ângela Teresa Pereira Reis Neto Vasconcelos, from Curitiba, in 1964
- Maria Carolina Portella Otto, from Curitiba, in 1992
- Maria Joana Parizotto, from Francisco Beltrão, in 1996
- Raissa Oliveira Santana, from Umuarama, in 2016

== Gallery of Titleholders ==
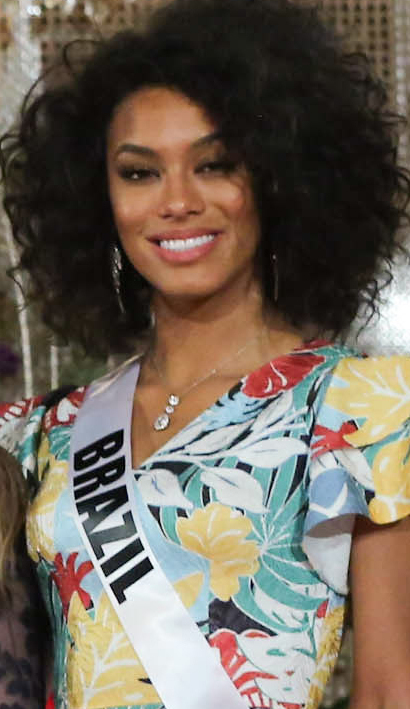
Miss Paraná 2016, and Miss Brazil 2016
Raissa Oliveira Santana

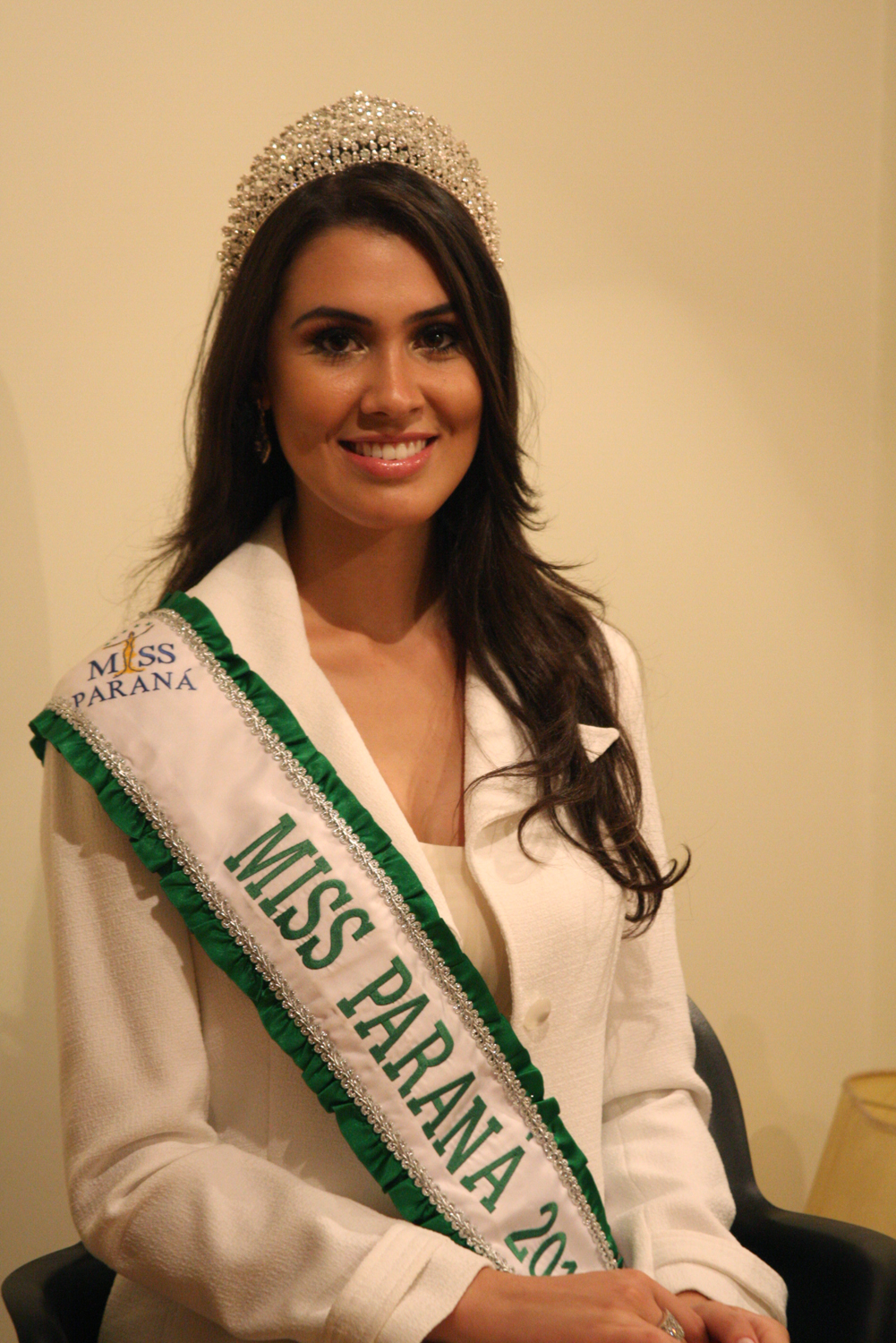
Miss Paraná 2011
Gabriela Cristina Pereira

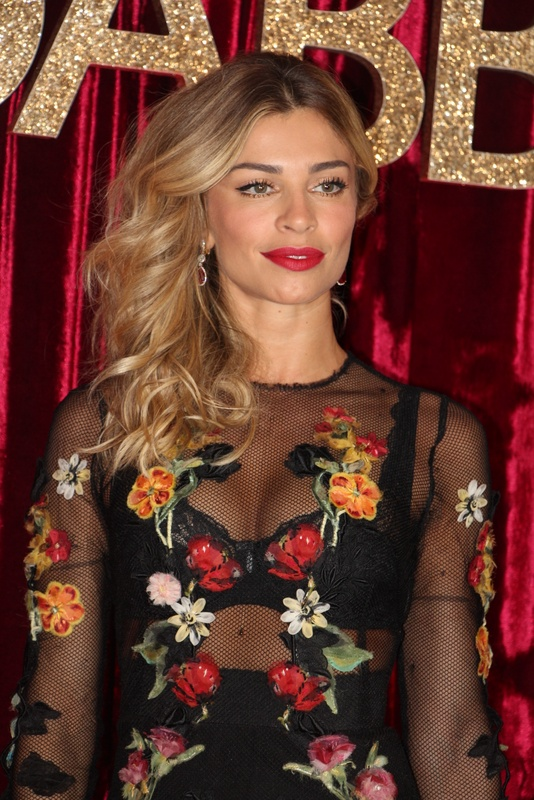
Miss Paraná 2004
Grazielli Soares Massafera

== Results summary ==
=== Placements ===
- Miss Brazil: Ângela Teresa Pereira Reis Neto Vasconcelos (1964); Maria Carolina Portella Otto (1992); Maria Joana Parizotto (1996); Raissa Oliveira Santana (2016)
- 1st Runner-Up: Tânia Mara Franco de Souza (1963); Wilza de Oliveira Rainato (1967); Patrícia Reginato (2005)
- 2nd Runner-Up: Marise Meyer Costa (1971); Grazielli Soares Massafera (2004); Vivian Noronha Cia (2007); Marylia Bernardt Lila (2010); Amanda Paggi (2020)
- 3rd Runner-Up: Marizabel do Roccio (1984); Kelly Kaniak de Oliveira (2002; later 2nd Runner-Up)
- 4th Runner-Up: Karin Japp Fuxreiter (1957); Cilmara Maria Camargo (1974); Cláudia Azzolini Chueiri (1976)
- Top 5/Top 6/Top 7/Top 8: Rosemary Raduhy (1965); Delzi Captan (1968); Maria Regina Corzânego (1970); Maria Alves de Oliveira (1975); Débora de Almeida Rosa (1977); Ísis Stocco (2013); Taynara Gargantini (2024); Paula Fernanda Assunção (2025)
- Top 10/Top 11/Top 12: Suzy Mara Samways (1978); Mônica Januzzi (1981); Ronimar Machado (1982); Elisa Gizely Kasminseki (1986); Sara Maria Lau de Souza (1987); Karla Cristina Kwiatkowski (1988); Cris Thomaszeck (1997); Jaqueline Amâncio (1998); Marken Maria Valerius (1999); Fernanda Letícia Schirr (2000); Ticiana Milanese Franco (2001); Elaine Lopes da Silva (2003); Bronie Cordeiro Alteiro (2008); Karine Martins de Souza (2009); Shaienne Emillinn Borges (2022)
- Top 15/Top 16: Gabriela Cristina Pereira (2011); Nathaly Goolkate (2014); Gabriela Gallas (2015); Patrícia Garcia (2017); Djenifer Frey (2019); Mariana Becker Bonetti (2023)

=== Special awards ===
- Miss Photogenic: Ana Maria Felício (1958); Elisa Gizely Kasminseki (1986); Karla Cristina Kwiatkowski (1988)
- Miss Congeniality: Tânia Mara Franco de Souza (1963); Maria Joana Parizotto (1996)
- Miss Be Emotion: Raissa Oliveira Santana (2016)
- Miss Ellus Challenge: Raissa Oliveira Santana (2016)

== Titleholders ==
Year	Name	Age (Note: Ages at the time of the pageant)	Height	Represented	Miss Brazil placement	Notes
Miss Universe Paraná
2026	Jéssica Rosa Krein	22	1.78 m (5 ft 10 in)	Marechal Cândido Rondon	TBD	
2025	Paula Fernanda Assunção	31	1.70 m (5 ft 7 in)	Foz do Iguaçu	Top 6	
2024	Taynara Gargantini	34	1.74 m (5 ft 8 1/2 in)	Paranavaí	Top 7	
2023	Mariana Becker Bonetti	26	1.68 m (5 ft 6 in)	Francisco Beltrão	Top 16	
2022	Shaienne "Shai" Emillinn Borges	26	1.70 m (5 ft 7 in)	São José dos Pinhais	Top 10	
2021	Marcella Kozinski	21	1.75 m (5 ft 9 in)	Curitiba		
U Miss Paraná 2020 and Miss Paraná Be Emotion 2020
2020	Amanda Paggi				2nd Alternative/Runner-Up	No national Miss Brazil contest due to the COVID-19 pandemic and change in the national franchise holder which caused the national titleholder to be appointed. Paggi was announced as the 2nd Alternative/Runner-Up for Miss Brazil that year in case the winner was unable to complete her reign as Miss Brazil and compete in Miss Universe that year.
Miss Paraná Be Emotion
2019	Djenifer Frey	20	1.80 m (5 ft 11 in)	Missal	Top 15	Last Miss Miss Paraná Be Emotion
2018	Deise Caroline Ribas	21	1.76 m (5 ft 9 1/2 in)	Rio Branco do Sul		
2017	Patrícia Garcia	24	1.76 m (5 ft 9 1/2 in)	Cambé	Top 16	
2016	Raissa Oliveira Santana	21	1.75 m (5 ft 9 in)	Umuarama	Miss Brazil 2016	Top 13 at Miss Universe 2016.
2015	Gabriela Gallas	19	1.76 m (5 ft 9 1/2 in)	Medianeira	Top 15	
Miss Paraná Universe
2014	Nathaly Goolkate	24	1.81 m (5 ft 11 1/2 in)	Carambeí	Top 15	
2013	Ísis Stocco	21	1.72 m (5 ft 7 1/2 in)	Maringá	Top 5	
2012	Alessandra Bernardi	20	1.75 m (5 ft 9 in)	Palotina		
Miss Paraná
2011	Gabriela Cristina Pereira			Umuarama	Top 15	
2010	Marylia Bernardt Lila			São Miguel do Iguaçu	2nd Runner-Up	
2009	Karine Martins de Souza			Cascavel	Top 10	
2008	Bronie Cordeiro Alteiro			Umuarama	Top 10	
2007	Vivian Noronha Cia			Umuarama	2nd Runner-Up	
2006	Daiane Hermelinda Carvalho Zanchet			Francisco Beltrão		
2005	Patrícia Reginato			Medianeira	1st Runner-Up; Miss Brazil World 2005	Competed at Miss World 2005.
2004	Grazielli Soares Massafera	22		Barra do Jacaré	2nd Runner-Up; Miss Brazil International 2004	Competed in Miss International 2004. Later was a contestant on Season 5 of Big Brother Brasil where she was the runner-up.
2003	Elaine Lopes da Silva			Umuarama	Top 10	
2002	Kelly Kaniak de Oliveira			Curitiba	3rd Runner-Up (later 2nd Runner-Up)	Kaniak became 2nd Runner-Up after the original winner of Miss Brazil that year was dethorned and all of the Runner-Ups were elevated a position with the 1st Runner-Up becoming Miss Brazil.
2001	Ticiana Milanese Franco			Maringá	Top 10	
2000	Fernanda Letícia Schirr			Francisco Beltrão	Top 11	
1999	Marken Maria Valerius			Medianeira	Top 10	
1998	Jaqueline Amâncio			Campina Grande do Sul	Top 12	
1997	Cris Thomaszeck			Curitiba	Top 12	
1996	Maria Joana Parizotto	19	1.80 m (5 ft 11 in)	Francisco Beltrão	Miss Brazil 1996	Competed in Miss Universe 1996.
1995	Marilici Perazolli			Manoel Ribas		
1994	Tatjana Ceratti			Foz do Iguaçu		
1993	No delegate sent in 1993 due to Miss Brazil 1993 being appointed rather than having a contest.					
1992	Maria Carolina Portella Otto	18	1.77 m (5 ft 9 1/2 in)	Curitiba	Miss Brazil 1992	Competed in Miss Universe 1992.
1991	No delegate sent in 1991.					
1990	No contest in 1990.					
1989	Sonali Patrícia de Souza					
1988	Karla Cristina Kwiatkowski				Top 12	
1987	Sara Maria Lau de Souza				Top 12	
1986	Elisa Gizely Kasminseki				Top 12	
1985	Scarleth Rodrigues					
1984	Marizabel do Roccio			Paranaguá	3rd Runner-Up	
1983	Salete Roseli Mendes					
1982	Ronimar Machado				Top 12	
1981	Mônica Januzzi			Londrina	Top 12	
1980	Soraya de Souza Costa			Curitiba		
1979	Marize Quirino de Souza			Antonina		
1978	Suzy Mara Samways			União da Vitória	Top 10	
1977	Débora de Almeida Rosa			Paranaguá	Top 8	
1976	Cláudia Azzolini Chueiri			Cornélio Procópio	4th Runner-Up	
1975	Maria Alves de Oliveira			Sertaneja	Top 8	
1974	Cilmara Maria Camargo			Cascavel	4th Runner-Up	
1973	Alda Maria Ferreira Nacli			Curitiba		
1972	Dolores Peres Bordin			Paranavaí		
1971	Marise Meyer Costa			Ibaiti	2nd Runner-Up	
1970	Maria Regina Corzânego			Cornélio Procópio	Top 8	
1969	Marli Sauerzapf Simon			Castro		
1968	Delzi Captan			Curitiba	Top 8	
1967	Wilza de Oliveira Rainato	17		Jandaia do Sul	1st Runner-Up (later Miss Brazil 1967); Miss Brazil Word 1967	Competed in Miss World 1967. Later became Miss Brazil after the original winner, Carmen Sílvia de Barros Ramasco of São Paulo, quit and broke the contract due to the bad organization and disrespect she claimed to be a victim of, as a result, Rainato became Miss Brazil.
1966	Miriam Marçal			Califórnia		
1965	Rosemary Raduhy			Apucarana	Top 8	
1964	Ângela Teresa Pereira Reis Neto Vasconcelos	19	1.75 m (5 ft 9 in)	Curitiba	Miss Brazil 1964	Top 15 at Miss Universe 1964.
1963	Tânia Mara Franco de Souza	19	1.70 m (5 ft 7 in)	Guarapuava	1st Runner-Up; Miss Brazil International 1963	Top 15 at Miss International 1963.
1962	Ana Maria Ribeiro Gonçalves			Londrina		
1961	Maria José do Nascimento			F.P.D.U. (Federação Paranaense de Desportos Universitários)		
1960	Maurina Kassemacke			Curso Pré-Jurídico		
1959	Shirley Tempski			F.P.D.U. (Federação Paranaense de Desportos Universitários)		
1958	Ana Maria Felício			Londrina		
1957	Karin Japp Fuxreiter			Círculo Militar do Paraná	4th Runner-Up	
1956	Ivony Lour Cardoso			F.P.D.U. (Federação Paranaense de Desportos Universitários)		
1955	Vilma Sozzi Wagner			Rádio Colombo		
1954	No delegate sent in 1954 as the contest didn't exist until 1955.					
