= Poker (sports manufacturer) =

Brazilian sports equipment

Poker Sports
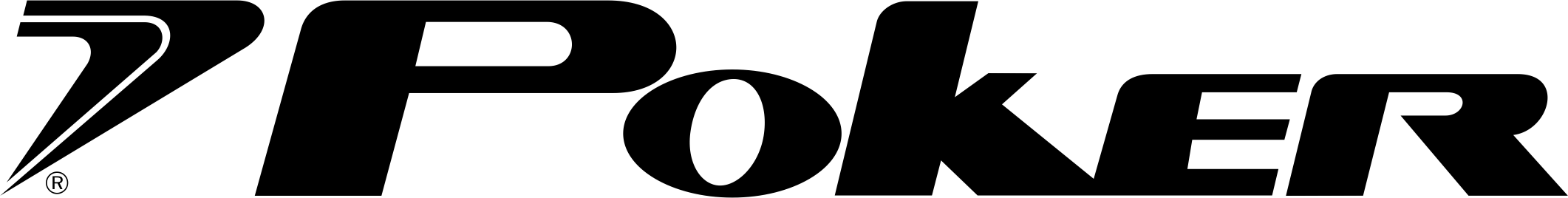
- Company type: Sociedade Anônima
- Traded as: Poker
- Industry: Sports equipment
- Founded: 1986; 40 years ago
- Founder: Frederico and Rogério Cauduro
- Headquarters: Montenegro, Rio Grande do Sul, Brazil
- Area served: South America and Asia
- Products: Apparel, balls, goalkeeper gloves, accessories
- Website: poker.esp.br

Poker is a Brazilian sports equipment manufacturing company based in Rio Grande do Sul.

== History ==
Founded in 1986 by the Cauduro brothers, after they realized that the national sports brands did not have products for different sports categories, but concentrated all their products on just one segment. During late 1980s they have been very successful among the amateur categories of various sports. During the 90s, it invested in professional soccer, and supplied equipment to teams in the Série A.

In the 2000s the brand went through a restructuring, focusing on sponsoring athletes instead of soccer clubs. The brand also entered the swimming segment.
