= Valério Luiz de Oliveira =

Brazilian sports journalist

- Born: c. 1962
- Died: July 5, 2012 (aged 49–50); Outside of Radio 820 AM, Goiânia, Goiás, Brazil
- Cause of death: Gunfire
- Occupations: Sports journalist, radio presenter and talk show host
- Years active: 1979–2012
- Employer: Radio 820 AM
- Known for: Sports commentary
- Spouse: Lorena Nascimento e Silva de Oliveira
- Children: 3
- Relatives: Manoel de Oliveira (father)

Valério Luiz de Oliveira (c. 1962 – 5 July 2012) was a Brazilian veteran sports journalist for the Radio 820 AM and TV PUC in Goiânia, Goiás, Brazil. Oliveira was believed to have been murdered as a result of a contract killing due to his critical statements and comments about the local soccer team's management.

== Personal ==
Valerio Luiz de Oliveira and his wife, Lorena Nascimento de Oliveira, have three children. Oliveira's father, Mane de Oliveria, was also a well known Brazilian sports presenter in Goias.

== Career ==
At the time of his death, Valerio Luiz de Oliveira was a radio presenter and host for Radio Jornal 820 AM. Oliveira started working as a sports journalist in 1978 at Radio Goiânia. Later he worked for TV Goiânia, Television Central de Brasil and TV y Radio Anhanguera Goiânia.

Valério Luiz de Oliveira was known for being outspoken and critical and for his strong opinions on the local soccer team, which may have led to his death. Before his murder, Oliveira had been banned from the Atlético Goiâniense football (soccer) team headquarters premises. He was well known in the community.

== Death ==
Valério Luiz de Oliveira was killed in Goiânia, Brazil.

Valerio Luiz de Oliveira was shot and killed on 5 July 2012 after leaving the Radio Jornal 820 AM offices. A motorcyclist was waiting for Oliveira at the station's entrance when he left the radio station. The cyclist attempted to flee but his car collided with another vehicle that was parked on the street. After the crash, the motorcyclist then fired seven gunshots into the driver's side window of Oliveira's vehicle. Police and eyewitnesses say Oliveira was struck by between four and six of those bullets while driving, crashed into a parked car, and died shortly after. According to his father, the investigation case had statements from 20 witnesses.

Oliveira had received death threats prior to his death, warning him that someone would "retire" him, "ending his career".

On 2 February 2012, police opened a case against a suspect, Mauricio Sampaio, who is the former deputy chairman of Atletico-Goiás, and for what the police alleged to be a hired killing, but Sampaio denies any involvement and he and others dismiss the facts of the case.

=== Impact ===
Valerio Luiz de Oliveria's death marked the fifth death of a journalist in Brazil in 2012 alone. Coming after the murders of Decius Sa (State of Maranhão); Paulo Souza Filho (Simões Filho, State of Baía) and Paulo Rocaro (Ponta Porã, Mato Grosso do Sul), Mario Randolph Marques Lopes (Rio de Janeiro)

=== Reactions ===
Irina Bokova, director-general of UNESCO, said, "I condemn the killing of Valério Luiz de Oliveira. It is essential that the authorities shed light on this murder and ensure the observance of the basic human right of freedom of expression and the right of the public to engage in informed, open debate."

"Deadly anti-press violence has been rising in Brazil for the past two years, and it's undermining journalists' ability to report critically on all types of topics important to the public," said a spokesperson for the Committee to Protect Journalists.

Seven month after the murder of Valério Luiz de Oliveira, Reporters Without Borders responded to what appeared to be progress in the investigation: Reporters Without Borders said “While respecting the presumption of innocence, we welcome the progress in the police investigation. The grave security problems to which Brazilian journalists are exposed, especially at the local level, affected Brazil’s ranking in the latest Reporters Without Borders press freedom index. But the efforts it often makes to combat impunity distinguish it from other countries in the region."
