= Rei da Cacimbinha =

- Origin: Vitória da Conquista, Bahia, Brazil
- Genres: Arrocha, forró, brega
- Years active: 2014–present
- Label: KL Produtora (2014-present)
- Members: Giovani Macedo; Igor Menezes; Hélio Pires

Rei da Cacimbinha is a Brazilian arrocha band, formed in September 2014 by members Giovani Macedo, Igor Menezes and Hélio Pires. Rei da Cacimbinha was formed in south Bahia, in Vitória da Conquista. Vocalist Hélio Pires (John Falcão), however, is from Barra da Estiva, located in the Chapada Diamantina mountain range.

The band rose to fame after the success of its song "Muriçoca", which has more than 8.5 million views on YouTube. Supported by their Internet fame, the band is currently performing about 20 shows per month. The band recorded a DVD of their performance in Messias, Alagoas where they were performing before an audience of 30,000 people.

The band has been constantly receiving news about being plagiarized. Songs in the band's repertoire include: "Muriçoca", "Pop 100", "Meu pai é foda", "Comendo a quilo", and "Vai pegar gelo". Pop 100's music video was filmed in Recife, Pernambuco.
