= Miss Brazil 2016 =

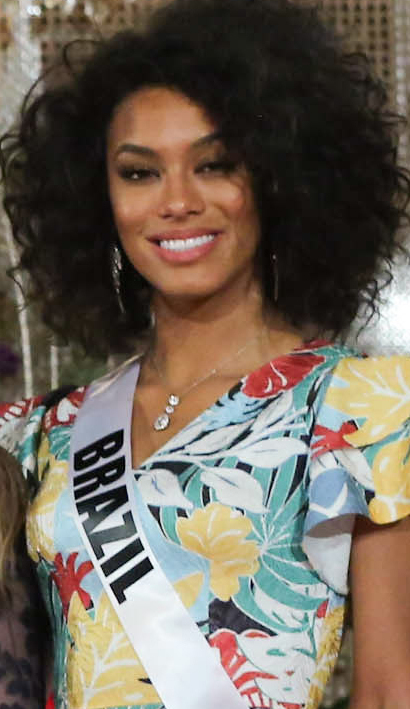
- Miss Brazil 2016, Raissa Santana
- Date: 1 October 2016
- Presenters: Cássio Reis; Daniele Suzuki; Karol Pinheiro
- Entertainment: Dom Paulinho Lima; Paula Lima
- Venue: Citibank Hall, São Paulo, São Paulo, Brazil
- Broadcaster: Band; Band.com.br
- Entrants: 27
- Placements: 15
- Winner: Raissa Santana; Paraná

Miss Brazil 2016 (Portuguese: Miss Brasil 2016), officially Miss Brazil Be Emotion 2016 (Portuguese: Miss Brasil Be Emotion 2016), was the 62nd edition of the Miss Brazil pageant. It was held on 1 October 2016 at Citibank Hall in São Paulo, and was hosted by Cássio Reis and Daniele Suzuki with Karol Pinheiro as a backstage correspondent.

Marthina Brandt of Rio Grande do Sul crowned her successor Raissa Santana of Paraná at the end of the event. Santana represented Brazil at the Miss Universe 2016 pageant and placed in the Top 13.

== Results ==
=== Placements ===
Placement	Contestant
Miss Brazil 2016	Paraná – Raissa Santana
1st Runner-Up	Rio Grande do Norte – Danielle Marion
2nd Runner-Up	Maranhão – Deise D'anne
Top 5	Alagoas – Gabriele Marinho; Ceará – Morgana Carlos
Top 10	Goiás – Mônica França; Minas Gerais – Paloma Marques; Rio Grande do Sul – Letícia Borghetti; São Paulo – Sabrina Paiva; Sergipe – Carol Valença
Top 15	Amazonas – Brena Dianná; Bahia – Victória Esteves; Espírito Santo – Beatriz Nalli; Mato Grosso – Taiany Zimpel; Pernambuco – Tallita Martins

=== Special awards ===
Award	Winner
Miss Be Emotion	Paraná – Raissa Santana
Miss Popular Vote	Amazonas – Brena Dianná

== Contestants ==
State	Contestant	Age	Height	Hometown	Placement	Notes
(Acre (state)) Acre	Jucianne Menezes	20	1.74 m (5 ft 8 1/2 in)	Rio Branco		
Alagoas	Gabriele Marinho	22	1.68 m (5 ft 6 in)	Maceió	Top 5	
Amapá	Joely Teixeira	24	1.72 m (5 ft 7 1/2 in)	Macapá		
(Amazonas (Brazilian state)) Amazonas	Brena Dianná	22	1.75 m (5 ft 9 in)	Parintins	Top 15	
Bahia	Victória Esteves	18	1.72 m (5 ft 7 1/2 in)	Salvador	Top 15	Was originally the 1st Runner-Up of Miss Bahia (Be Emotion) 2016 but later took over as Miss Bahia after the original winner, Juliana Oliveira, was dethroned for being pregnant.
Ceará	Morgana Carlos	20	1.72 m (5 ft 7 1/2 in)	Quixadá	Top 5	
(Federal District (Brazil)) Distrito Federal	Sarah Alves	20	1.78 m (5 ft 10 in)	Sudoeste/Octogonal		
Espírito Santo	Beatriz Leite	18	1.74 m (5 ft 8 1/2 in)	Castelo	Top 15	
Goiás	Mônica França	21	1.72 m (5 ft 7 1/2 in)	Anápolis	Top 10	
Maranhão	Deise D'anne	26	1.72 m (5 ft 7 1/2 in)	Santo Amaro do Maranhão	2nd Runner-Up	
Mato Grosso	Taiany Zimpel	18	1.80 m (5 ft 11 in)	Sorriso	Top 15	
Mato Grosso do Sul	Yara Deckner	20	1.75 m (5 ft 9 in)	Campo Grande		
Minas Gerais	Paloma Marques	21	1.77 m (5 ft 9 1/2 in)	Senador Firmino	Top 10	
Pará	Fablina Paixão	18	1.78 m (5 ft 10 in)	Marabá		
Paraíba	Mayrla Vasconcelos	20	1.85 m (6 ft 1 in)	Nova Palmeira		
(Paraná (state)) Paraná	Raissa Santana	21	1.75 m (5 ft 9 in)	Umuarama	Miss Brazil 2016	
Pernambuco	Tallita Martins	20	1.74 m (5 ft 8 1/2 in)	Serra Talhada	Top 15	
Piauí	Lara Lobo	20	1.75 m (5 ft 9 in)	Floriano		
(Rio de Janeiro (state)) Rio de Janeiro	Sabrina Amorim	18	1.77 m (5 ft 9 1/2 in)	Niterói		
Rio Grande do Norte	Danielle Marion	25	1.78 m (5 ft 10 in)	Mossoró	1st Runner-Up	
Rio Grande do Sul	Letícia Borghetti	22	1.76 m (5 ft 9 1/2 in)	Tapera	Top 10	
Rondônia	Mariana Theol	19	1.75 m (5 ft 9 in)	Ji-Paraná		
Roraima	Iane Cardoso	23	1.72 m (5 ft 7 1/2 in)	Boa Vista		
(Santa Catarina (state)) Santa Catarina	Mariana Guerra	24	1.76 m (5 ft 9 1/2 in)	Araranguá		
(São Paulo (state)) São Paulo	Sabrina Paiva	21	1.81 m (5 ft 11 1/2 in)	Caconde	Top 10	
Sergipe	Carol Valença	21	1.72 m (5 ft 7 1/2 in)	Aracaju	Top 10	
Tocantins	Jaqueline Verrel	24	1.75 m (5 ft 9 in)	Dueré		
