= Bom Princípio =

Municipality of Rio Grande do Sul, Brazil

- Municipality
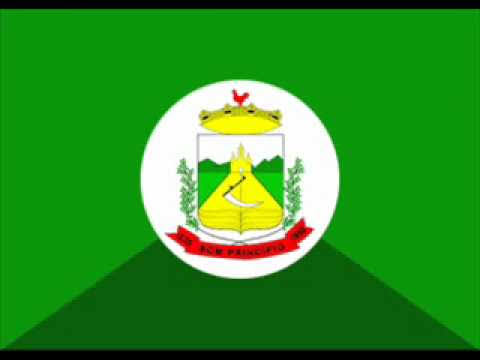
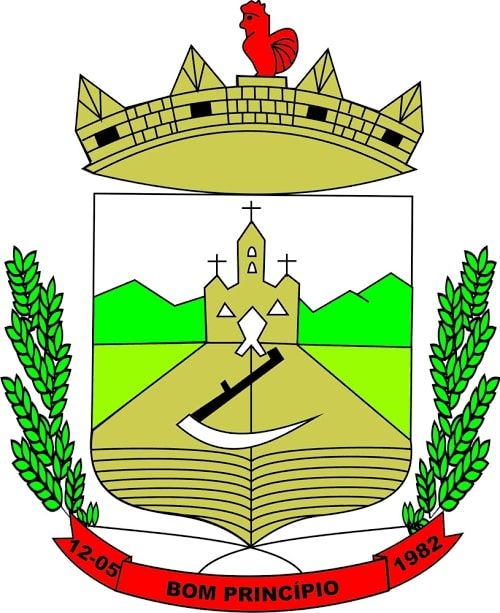
- Flag Coat of arms

- Location within Rio Grande do Sul

- Location in Brazil
- Coordinates: 29.4833°S 51.35°W
- Country: Brazil
- State: Rio Grande do Sul

Government
  - Mayor: Fábio Persch (2017-2020)

Population (2020)
  - Total: 14,255
- Time zone: UTC−3 (BRT)
- Postal code: 95765-000
- Area/distance code: 51
- Website: bomprincipio.rs.gov.br

Bom Princípio is a municipality in the state of Rio Grande do Sul, Brazil. It is known in all Brazil as Strawberry Land.

It was raised to municipality status in 1992, the area being taken out of the municipalities of São Sebastião do Caí and Montenegro. Part of its initial area subsequently formed the municipalities of Tupandi and São Vendelino.

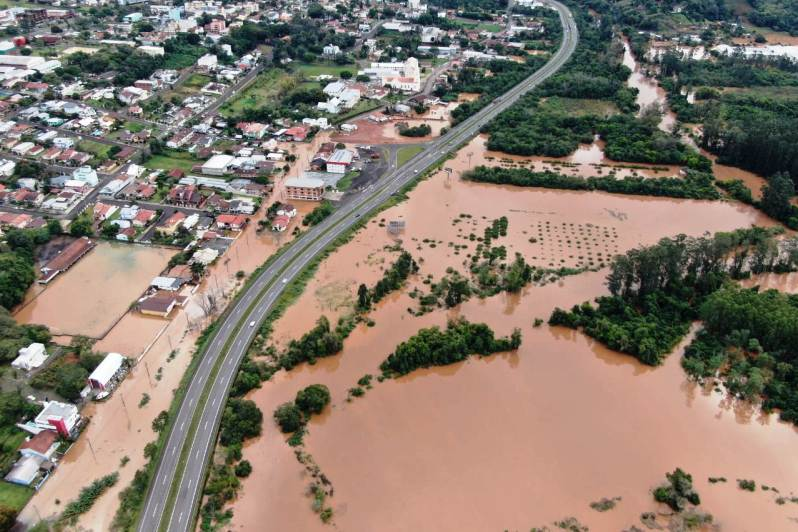
Flooding in Bom Princípio of the Caí River in Brazil during July 2020

== See also ==
- List of municipalities in Rio Grande do Sul
