= Estrela, Rio Grande do Sul =

Municipality of Rio Grande do Sul, Brazil

Estrela
- Municipality
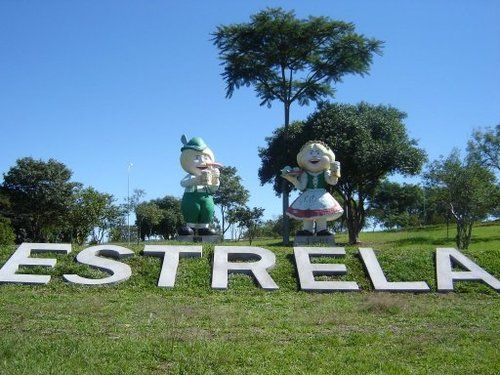

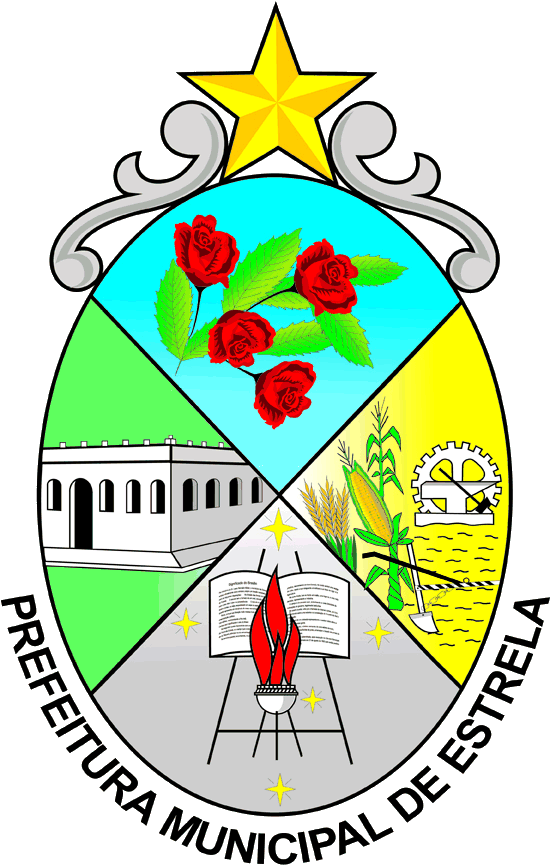
- Flag Coat of arms

- Location within Rio Grande do Sul

- Location in Brazil
- Coordinates: 29°30′07″S 51°57′57″W
- Country: Brazil
- State: Rio Grande do Sul

Population (2022)
  - Total: 32,183
- Time zone: UTC−3 (BRT)

Estrela is a municipality in the state of Rio Grande do Sul, Brazil.

== See also ==
- List of municipalities in Rio Grande do Sul
