= Rafaela Zanella =

Brazilian model, Miss Brasil 2006 (born 1986)

- Born: Rafaela Köhler Zanella; 9 August 1986 (age 40); Santa Maria, Rio Grande do Sul, Brazil
- Occupations: Model, student
- Height: 5 ft 10 in (1.78 m)
- Spouse: Denis Valente
- Beauty pageant titleholder
- Title: Miss Brasil 2006
- Major competitions: Miss Brasil 2006 (winner); Miss Universe 2006 (top 20)
- Website: www.missuniverse.com/delegates/2006/files/BR.html

Rafaela Köhler Zanella (born 9 August 1986 in Santa Maria) is a Brazilian model and beauty pageant titleholder of German and Italian descent who represented her country in the Miss Universe 2006 pageant.

== Miss Brasil 2006 ==
Zanella was elected Miss Brasil 2006 on 8 April 2006, representing her state, Rio Grande do Sul.

== Miss Universe 2006 ==
In the Miss Universe 2006 pageant, which took place on 23 July 2006 in Los Angeles, California, United States, Zanella placed in the semifinals, among the top 20.

Awards and achievements
Preceded by (Santa Catarina (state)) Carina Beduschi	Miss Universo Brasil; 2006	Succeeded by (Minas Gerais) Natália Guimarães
Preceded by Eunice Pratti	Miss Rio Grande do Sul; 2006	Succeeded by Carolina Prates
