= São Vendelino =

Municipality of Rio Grande do Sul, Brazil

- Municipality
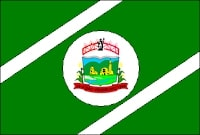
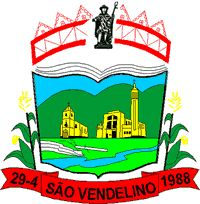
- Flag Coat of arms

- Location within Rio Grande do Sul

- Location in Brazil
- Coordinates: 29°23′S 51°18′W
- Country: Brazil
- State: Rio Grande do Sul

Population (2020)
  - Total: 2,266
- Time zone: UTC−3 (BRT)

São Vendelino is a municipality in the state of Rio Grande do Sul, Brazil. It was raised to municipality status in 1988, the area being taken out of the municipality of Bom Princípio.

== See also ==
- German-Brazilian
- List of municipalities in Rio Grande do Sul
- Riograndenser Hunsrückisch
