= Raissa Santana =

Brazilian model and beauty pageant titleholder

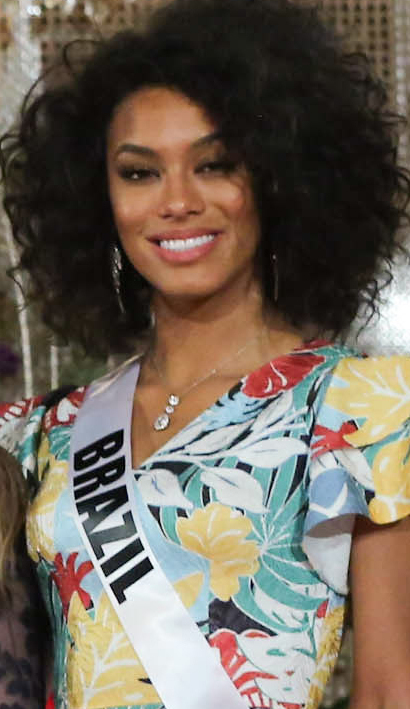
- Santana in January 2017 at Malacañang Palace in Manila
- Born: July 6, 1995 (age 31); Itaberaba, Bahia, Brazil
- Height: 1.75 m (5 ft 9 in)
- Beauty pageant titleholder
- Title: Miss Paraná 2016; Miss Brazil 2016
- Hair color: Black
- Eye color: Brown
- Major competitions: Miss Brazil 2016; (Winner); Miss Universe 2016; (Top 13)

Raissa Oliveira Santana (born July 6, 1995) is a Brazilian model and beauty pageant titleholder who won Miss Brasil 2016. She represented Brazil at Miss Universe 2016 pageant.

== Personal life ==
Santana is a model and a Marketing student in Brazil. She is the second Miss Brasil winner of Afro-Brazilian descent, after Deise Nunes (1986).

== Pageantry ==
=== Miss Brasil 2016 ===
Santana was crowned Miss Brasil 2016 representing Paraná on October 1, 2016.

=== Miss Universe 2016 ===
Santana represented Brazil at Miss Universe 2016 where she placed in the Top 13.

Awards and achievements
Preceded by (Rio Grande do Sul) Marthina Brandt	Miss Universo Brasil; 2016	Succeeded by (Piauí) Monalysa Alcântara
Preceded by Gabriela Gallas	Miss Paraná; 2016	Succeeded by Patricia Garcia
