= Santaluz =

Municipality of Bahia State, Brazil

- Municipality of Bahia, Brazil
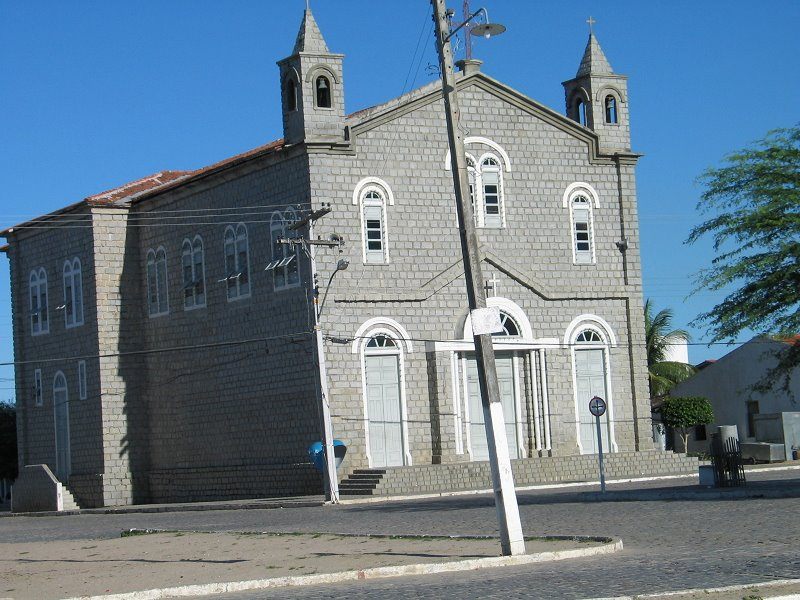
- Santa Luzia parish church

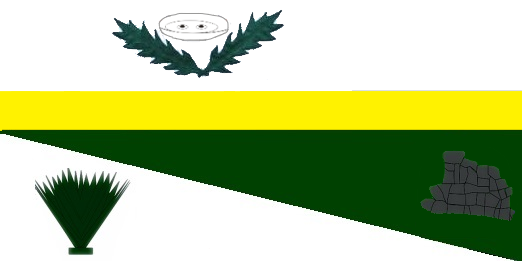
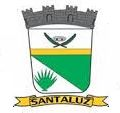
- Flag Coat of arms

- Location of Santaluz in Bahia

- Location within Brazil Location within South America
- Coordinates: 11°15′21″S 39°22′30″W
- Country: Brazil
- Region: Northeast
- State: Bahia
- Founded: 18 July 1935

Government
  - Mayor: Arismário Barbosa Junior (Avante) (2025-2028)
  - Vice Mayor: Joélcio Martins da Silva Filho (MDB) (2025-2028)

Area
  - Total: 1,623.445 km^{2} (626.816 sq mi)
- Elevation: 363 m (1,191 ft)

Population (2022)
  - Total: 37,834
  - Density: 23.3/km^{2} (60/sq mi)
- Demonym: Luzense (Brazilian Portuguese)
- Time zone: UTC-03:00 (Brasília Time)
- Postal code: 48880-000
- HDI (2010): 0.598 – medium
- Website: santaluz.ba.gov.br

Santaluz is a municipality in the Brazilian state of Bahia. Its estimated population in 2020 is 37,531.

== See also ==
- List of municipalities in Bahia
