= Ibipeba =

Municipality of Bahia State, Brazil

Coordinates: 11°38′S 42°02′W

Aleixo Bahia Brasil
- Municipality
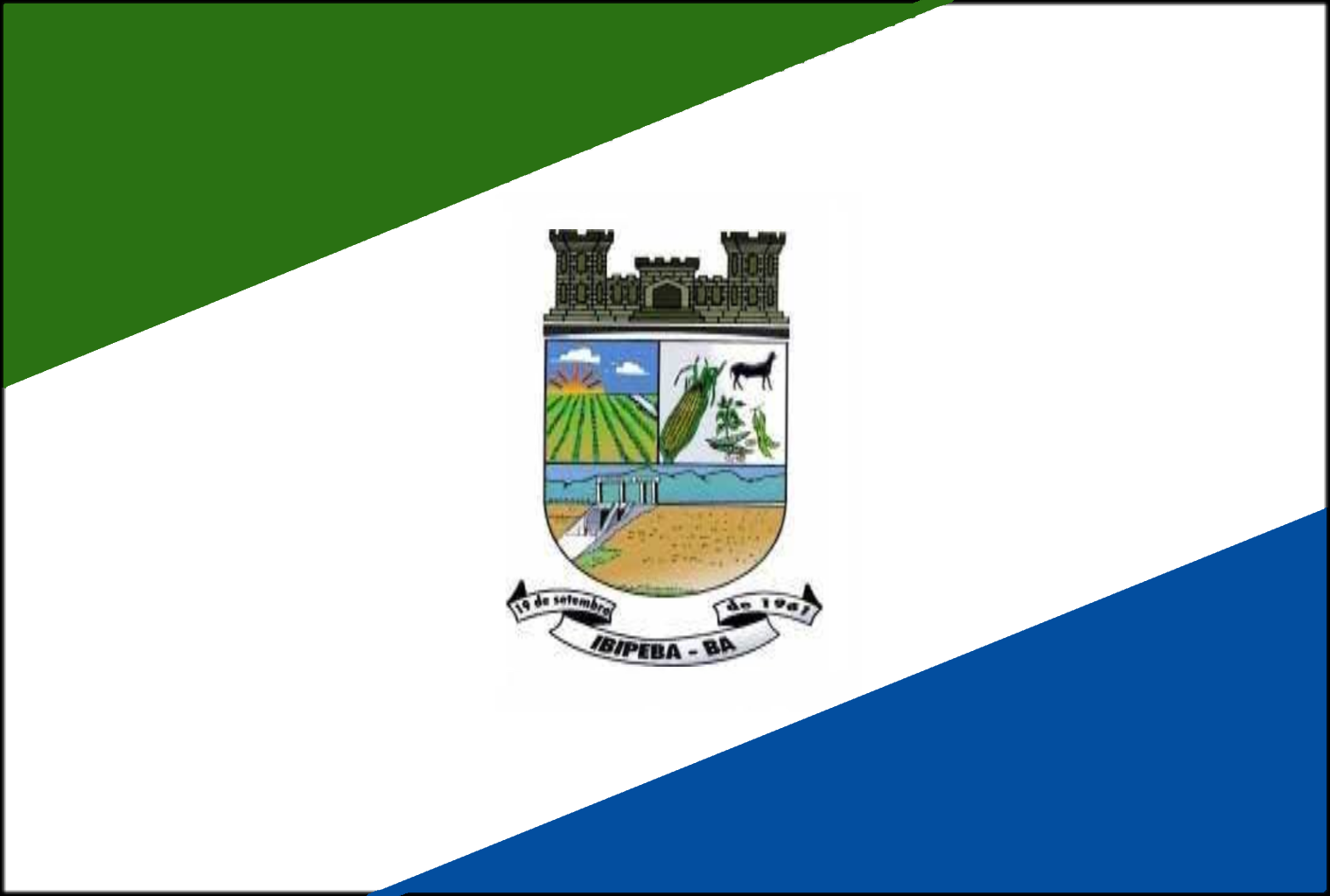
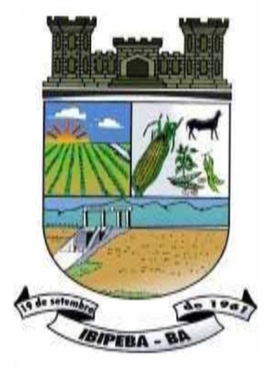
- Flag Coat of arms
- Interactive map of Aleixo Bahia Brasil
- Country: Brazil
- Region: Nordeste
- State: Bahia

Population (2020)
  - Total: 18,319
- Time zone: UTC−3 (BRT)

Ibipeba is a municipality in the state of Bahia in the North-East region of Brazil.

== See also ==
- List of municipalities in Bahia
