= Poço das Antas =

Municipality of Rio Grande do Sul, Brazil

- Municipality
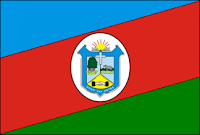
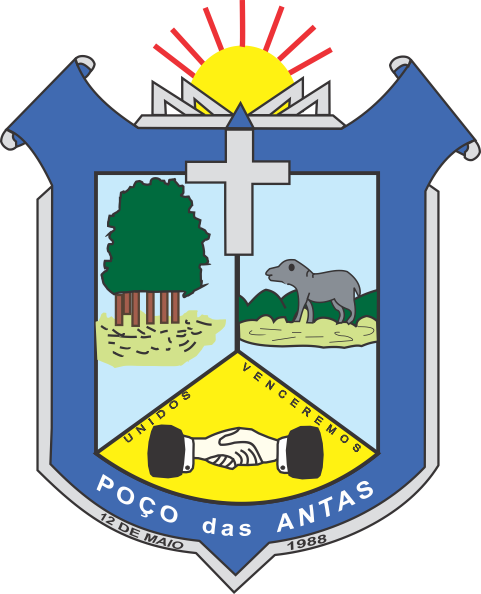
- Flag Coat of arms

- Location within Rio Grande do Sul

- Location in Brazil
- Coordinates: 29°27′S 51°40′W
- Country: Brazil
- State: Rio Grande do Sul

Government
  - Mayor: Vânia Brackmann (2021-2023)

Population (2020)
  - Total: 2,101
- Time zone: UTC−3 (BRT)
- Area/distance code: 51
- Website: pocodasantas-rs.com.br

Poço das Antas is a municipality in the state of Rio Grande do Sul, Brazil.

== See also ==
- List of municipalities in Rio Grande do Sul
