= Carina Beduschi =

Brazilian model

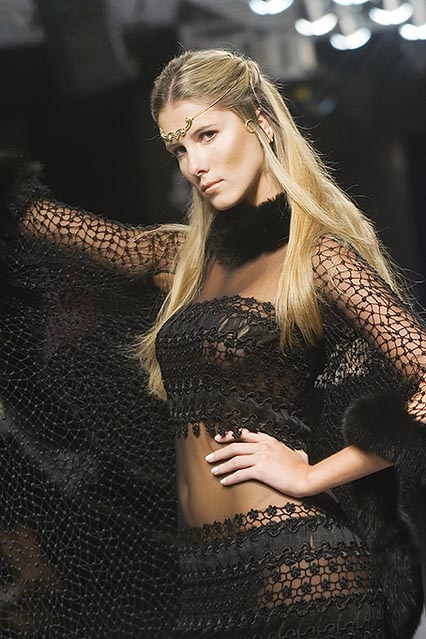
- Born: Carina Schlichting Beduschi; December 19, 1984 (age 41); Florianópolis, Santa Catarina, Brazil
- Occupations: Model; TV host; actress; architect
- Height: 1.80 m (5 ft 11 in)
- Beauty pageant titleholder
- Title: Miss Santa Catarina 2005; Miss Brasil 2005
- Hair color: Blonde
- Eye color: Hazel
- Major competitions: Miss Santa Catarina 2005 (winner); Miss Brasil 2005 (winner); Miss Universe 2005 (unplaced)

Carina Schlichting Beduschi (born December 19, 1984) is a Brazilian actress, television host, architect, model and beauty pageant titleholder who represented Brazil at the Miss Universe 2005.

Beduschi was elected as the 51st Miss Brasil on 14 April 2005 at Copacabana Palace Hotel in Rio de Janeiro. Before competing at Miss Brasil, she had won Miss Santa Catarina 2005 contest. In May 2005, she competed in the Miss Universe 2005 pageant held in Thailand. She is cousin of Isabel Cristina Beduschi won Miss Santa Catarina and Miss Brasil contests in 1988.

== Biography ==
Beduschi was born in Florianópolis, Santa Catarina. Her father, Domingos Sávio Beduschi, is of Italian descent and her mother, Helena Márcia Schlichting Beduschi, is of German descent. Beduschi, who is majoring in architecture at private university UNISUL (Universidade do Sul, in Santa Catarina) had to stop her studies at the college during her reign, to be able to fulfill her duties for Organização Miss Brasil Oficial.

She has appeared in magazines such as Caras and pictures of her, taken in Rio de Janeiro were shown in local newspapers, such as O Dia and Extra.

She has been interviewed by TNT channel. Beduschi has also been an invitee on Luiz Carlos Prattes' show, at CBN Diário and TVCom, and visited the state of Santa Catarina Legislative Assembly.

== Stats ==
- Hair: blonde
- Eyes: hazel
- Height: 180 cm
- Weight: 59 kg
- Chest: 88 cm
- Hips: 88 cm
- Waist: 60 cm

Awards and achievements
Preceded by Rio Grande do Sul Fabiane Niclotti	Miss Universo Brasil; 2005	Succeeded by Rio Grande do Sul Rafaela Zanella
Preceded by Celia Renata da Silva	Miss Santa Catarina; 2005	Succeeded by Back Beatriz Neves
