= Tupandi =

Municipality of Rio Grande do Sul, Brazil

- Municipality
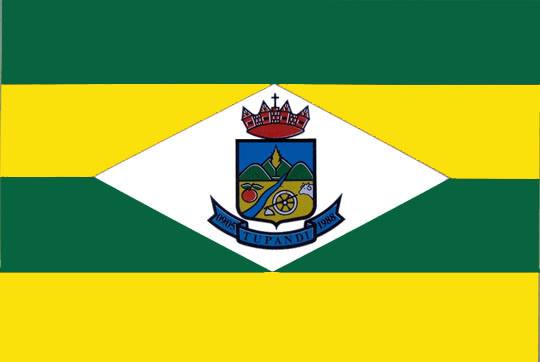
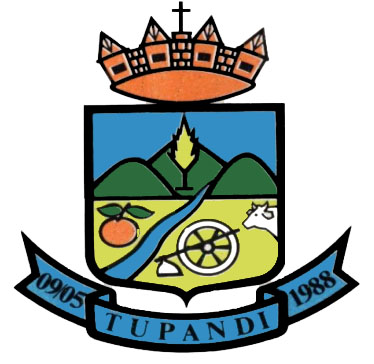
- Flag Coat of arms

- Location within Rio Grande do Sul

- Location in Brazil
- Coordinates: 29°28′S 51°25′W
- Country: Brazil
- State: Rio Grande do Sul

Population (2020)
  - Total: 4,939
- Time zone: UTC−3 (BRT)

Tupandi is a municipality in the state of Rio Grande do Sul, Brazil.It has a population of approximately 4,500 inhabitants and covers an area of 47.4 square kilometers (IBGE, 2021). The municipality is situated in the Metropolitan Region of Porto Alegre, and it is located approximately 80 kilometers west of the state capital.

One of the main economic activities in Tupandi is agriculture, with the production of fruits, vegetables, and dairy products being the most prominent. The municipality is also home to some industries, such as a shoe factory and a paper and pulp company (Prefeitura de Tupandi, n.d.).

The history of Tupandi dates back to the late 19th century when German immigrants began settling in the area. The name "Tupandi" comes from the indigenous Tupi-Guarani language and means "place of the quails" (IBGE, 2021).

In terms of tourism, Tupandi is known for its natural environment, with several parks and green areas. One of the most popular attractions in the municipality is the Morro da Cruz park, which has hiking trails and views of the surrounding landscape.

== See also ==
- List of municipalities in Rio Grande do Sul
