= Salvador do Sul =

Municipality of Rio Grande do Sul, Brazil

- Municipality
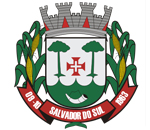
- Flag Coat of arms

- Location within Rio Grande do Sul

- Location in Brazil
- Coordinates: 29°26′16″S 51°30′39″W
- Country: Brazil
- State: Rio Grande do Sul

Population (2020)
  - Total: 7,889
- Time zone: UTC−3 (BRT)

Salvador do Sul is a municipality in the state of Rio Grande do Sul, Brazil.

== See also ==
- List of municipalities in Rio Grande do Sul
