= Miss Brazil 2006 =

- Date: 8 April 2006
- Presenters: Nayla Micherif; Nivaldo Prieto
- Entertainment: Simone
- Venue: Claro Hall, Rio de Janeiro, Rio de Janeiro State, Brazil
- Broadcaster: Band
- Entrants: 27
- Placements: 10
- Winner: Rafaela Zanella; Rio Grande do Sul
- Congeniality: Patrícia Trindade; Amapá

Miss Brazil 2006 (Portuguese: Miss Brasil 2006) was the 52nd edition of the Miss Brazil pageant. It was held on 8 April 2006 at Claro Hall in Rio de Janeiro, Rio de Janeiro State, Brazil and was hosted by Nayla Micherif and Nivaldo Prieto. Carina Beduschi of Santa Catarina crowned her successor Rafaela Zanella of Rio Grande do Sul at the end of the event. Zanella represented Brazil at the Miss Universe 2006 pageant and placed in the Top 20. 1st Runner-Up, Maria Cláudia Barreto of Acre, represented the country at Miss International 2006. This year's pageant had Natalie Glebova, Miss Universe 2005, as a special guest.

== Results ==
Final results	Contestant
Miss Brazil 2006; Miss Brazil Universe 2006	Rio Grande do Sul – Rafaela Zanella
1st Runner-Up; Miss Brazil International 2006	Acre – Maria Cláudia Barreto
2nd Runner-Up	Santa Catarina – Beatriz Back
3rd Runner-Up	Mato Grosso do Sul - Rhaíssa Siviero
4th Runner-Up	Bahia – Juliana Pina
Top 10	Distrito Federal – Ana Cláudia Pimenta; Mato Grosso – Vanessa Jesus; Minas Gerais – Marcela Duarte; Pernambuco – Rayana Carvalho; Tocantins – Camila Christie

=== Special awards ===
Award	Winner
Best State Costume	Ceará – Carla Medeiros
Miss Congeniality (Miss Simpatia)	Amapá – Patrícia Trindade
Miss Popular Vote	Distrito Federal – Ana Cláudia Pimenta

== Contestants ==
The delegates for Miss Brazil 2006 were:

- Acre - Maria Cláudia Barreto de Oliveira
- Alagoas - Tatiane Maria Bezerra Correia Terêncio
- Amapá - Patrícia Trindade Tavares
- Amazonas - Thaysa de Souza Neves
- Bahia - Juliana Pina Mendonça
- Ceará - Carla Medeiros Rocha
- Federal District (Distrito Federal) - Ana Cláudia Sandoval Pimenta
- Espírito Santo - Lívia Barraque Barbosa
- Goiás - Sileimã Alves Pinheiro
- Maranhão - Aislanny Silva de Medeiros
- Mato Grosso - Vanessa Regina de Jesus
- Mato Grosso do Sul - Rhaíssa Espindola Siviero Olmedo
- Minas Gerais - Marcela de Almeida Carvalho Duarte
- Pará - Nahdia Lopes Rocha
- Paraíba - Sarah Azevedo Rodrigues
- Paraná - Daiane Hermelinda Carvalho Zanchet
- Pernambuco - Rayanna Carvalho de Magalhães
- Piauí - Priscila Karinne da Silva Rocha
- Rio de Janeiro - Roberta Cesar Manhães Duarte
- Rio Grande do Norte - Jeisa Karina de Araújo
- Rio Grande do Sul - Rafaela Zanella
- Rondônia - Suzana Freire Cavalcante Gomes
- Roraima - Érika Vasconcelos Magalhães
- Santa Catarina - Beatriz Back Neves
- São Paulo - Nicole Bernardes Cardoso
- Sergipe - Aisley Karoline Araújo de Souza
- Tocantins - Camilla Christie Ribeiro Oliveira
