= Simões Filho =

Coordinates: 12°47′02″S 38°24′14″W

- Municipality
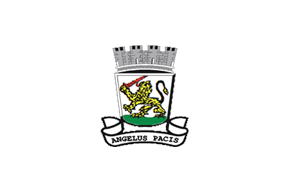
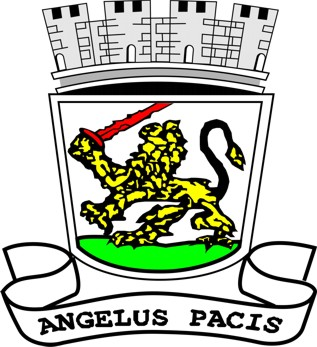
- Flag Coat of arms

- Location of Simões Filho in the state Bahia

- Location in Brazil
- Country: Brazil
- Region: Nordeste
- State: Bahia

Area
  - Total: 77.692 sq mi (201.222 km^{2})
- Elevation: 171 ft (52 m)

Population (2022 Census)
  - Total: 114,441
  - Estimate (2025): 120,419
  - Density: 1,473.00/sq mi (568.730/km^{2})
- Time zone: UTC−3 (BRT)

Simões Filho is a municipality in the state of Bahia in the North-East region of Brazil.

== Notable people ==
- Danilo Barbosa (born 28 February 1996), simply known as Danilo, is a Brazilian professional footballer who plays for Spanish club Valencia CF on loan from Braga as a defensive midfielder.
- Gabriella Marcelino (born 1989), model, runner-up at the Miss Brazil 2021

== See also ==
- List of municipalities in Bahia
