= Miss Brazil 2005 =

- Date: 14 April 2005
- Presenters: Nayla Micherif; Roger Gobeth; Juliana Silveira; Igor Cotrim; Maria Carolina Ribeiro; Astrid Fontenelle
- Entertainment: Wilson Simoninha; Bossacucanova
- Venue: Copacabana Palace, Rio de Janeiro, Rio de Janeiro State, Brazil
- Broadcaster: Band
- Entrants: 27
- Placements: 10
- Winner: Carina Beduschi; Santa Catarina
- Congeniality: Danielle Abrantes; Bahia

Miss Brazil 2005 (Portuguese: Miss Brasil 2005) was the 51st edition of the Miss Brazil pageant. It was held on 14 April 2005 at Copacabana Palace in Rio de Janeiro, Rio de Janeiro State, Brazil and was hosted by Nayla Micherif with Roger Gobeth, Juliana Silveira, Igor Cotrim, and Maria Carolina Ribeiro all as commentators. The Pre-Show was hosted by Astrid Fontenelle. Fabiane Niclotti of Rio Grande do Sul crowned her successor Carina Beduschi of Santa Catarina at the end of the event. Beduschi represented Brazil at the Miss Universe 2005 pageant. 1st Runner-Up, Patrícia Reginato of Paraná, represented Brazil at Miss World 2005 and 2nd Runner-Up, Ariane Colombo of Espírito Santo, represented the country at Miss International 2005.

== Results ==
Final results	Contestant
Miss Brazil 2005; Miss Brazil Universe 2005	Santa Catarina – Carina Beduschi
1st Runner-Up; Miss Brazil World 2005	Paraná – Patrícia Reginato
2nd Runner-Up; Miss Brazil International 2005	Espírito Santo – Ariane Colombo
3rd Runner-Up	Tocantins - Francielly Araújo
4th Runner-Up	Minas Gerais – Tatiane Alves
Top 10	Amazonas – Danielle Souza; Bahia – Danielle Abrantes; Rio de Janeiro – Carolina Pires; Rio Grande do Sul – Eunice Pratti; São Paulo – Glenda Saccomano

=== Special awards ===
Award	Winner
Miss Congeniality (Miss Simpatia)	Bahia – Danielle Abrantes
Miss Popular Vote	São Paulo – Glenda Saccomano

== Contestants ==
The delegates for Miss Brazil 2005 were:

- Acre - Suzana Oltramari
- Alagoas - Aline Roberta Serafim da Rocha
- Amapá - Monique de Paula Houat
- Amazonas - Danielle Costa de Souza
- Bahia - Danielle Cristine Abrantes de Oliveira
- Ceará - Daniela Amaral Silva
- Distrito Federal (Federal District) - Adriana Watanabe Bambora
- Espírito Santo - Ariane Colombo
- Goiás - Nevilla Nyoiche Veloso Palmieri
- Maranhão - Telécia Neves de Souza
- Mato Grosso - Fernanda Mara Frasson
- Mato Grosso do Sul - Laila Teixeira Ramos
- Minas Gerais - Tatiane Kelen Barbosa Alves
- Pará - Fernanda de Fátima Barreto e Silva
- Paraíba - Lilian Vasconcelos Moura
- Paraná - Patrícia Reginato
- Pernambuco - Carolline de Castilhos Medeiros
- Piauí - Verônica Scheren de Oliveira
- Rio de Janeiro - Carolina Soares Pires
- Rio Grande do Norte - Kelyanne F. Medeiros
- Rio Grande do Sul - Eunice Vieira Pratti
- Rondônia - Fabiana Cortez
- Roraima - Thaynná de Melo Batista
- Santa Catarina - Carina Beduschi
- São Paulo - Glenda Saccomano Castro
- Sergipe - Claudianne Bomfim dos Santos
- Tocantins - Francielly de Oliveira Araújo
