= Fabiane Niclotti =

Brazilian model and beauty pageant winner

- Born: Fabiane Tesche Niclotti; 6 October 1984; Gramado, Rio Grande do Sul, Brazil
- Died: 28 June 2016 (aged 31); Gramado, Rio Grande do Sul, Brazil
- Beauty pageant titleholder
- Title: Miss Rio Grande do Sul 2004; Miss Brasil 2004
- Hair color: Brown
- Eye color: Green
- Major competitions: Miss Brasil 2004 (winner); Miss Universe 2004 (unplaced)

Fabiane Tesche Niclotti (6 October 1984 – 28 June 2016) was a Brazilian model and beauty pageant titleholder. She was also a Law student and a business manager of a store.

On 15 April 2004, she was elected Miss Brasil, representing Rio Grande do Sul, a state with a tradition of many Miss Brazil winners. During her time contesting Miss Universe, she was seen as very beautiful, content, and friendly. She studied English in Exeter, with the money she received from winning Miss Brazil. She studied social science at Universidade Federal do Rio Grande do Sul.

She was found dead on the evening of 28 June 2016, at her apartment in Gramado. The cause of her death remains unknown.

Awards and achievements
Preceded by (Tocantins) Gislaine Ferreira	Miss Universo Brasil; 2004	Succeeded by (Santa Catarina (state)) Carina Beduschi
Preceded by Tatyana Scarelli	Miss Rio Grande do Sul; 2004	Succeeded by Eunice Pratti
