= Montenegro, Rio Grande do Sul =

Municipality of Rio Grande do Sul, Brazil

Montenegro
- Municipality
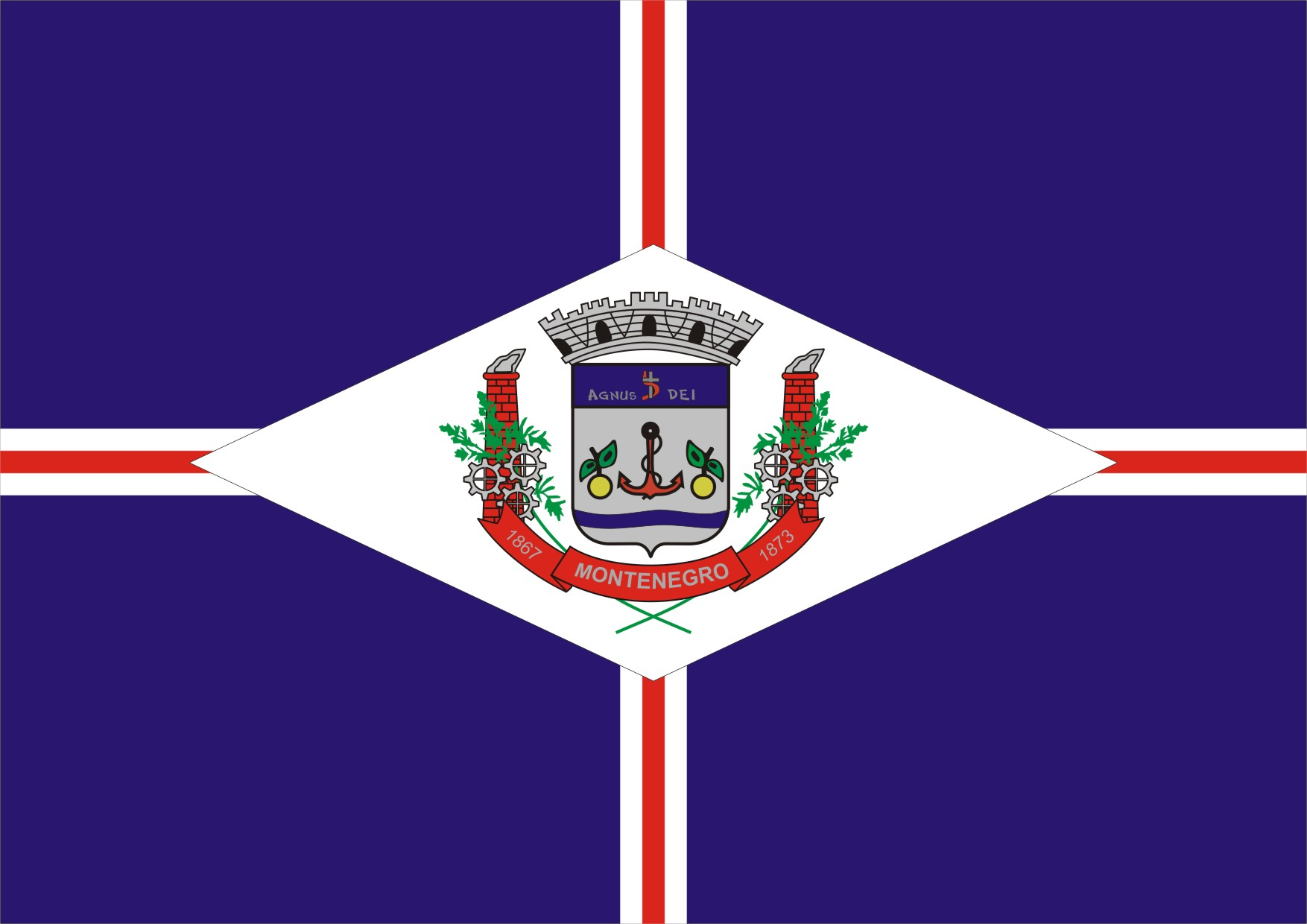
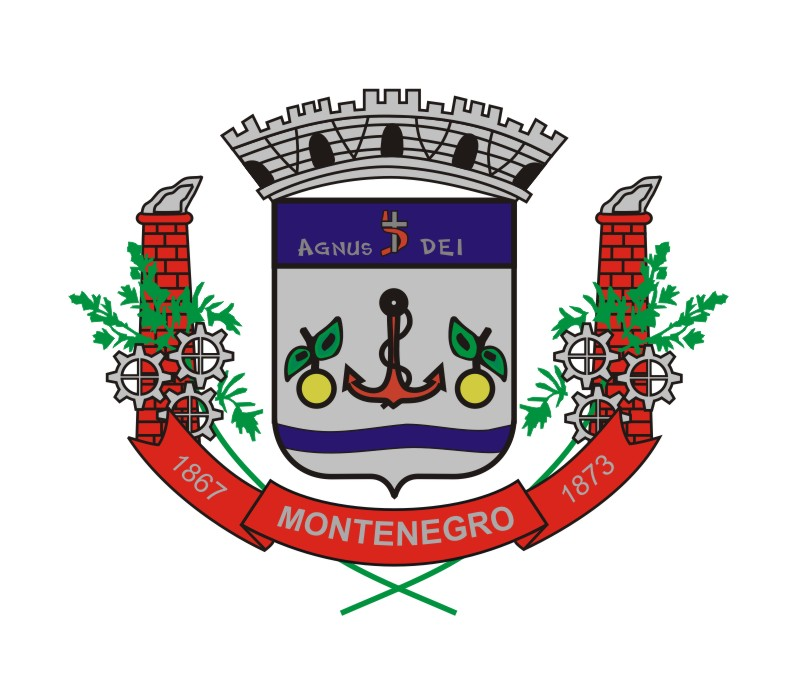
- Flag Coat of arms

- Location within Rio Grande do Sul

- Location in Brazil
- Coordinates: 29°41′20″S 51°27′39″W
- Country: Brazil
- State: Rio Grande do Sul

Population (2022)
  - Total: 64,322
- Time zone: UTC−3 (BRT)

Montenegro is a municipality of the state of Rio Grande do Sul, Brazil. As of 2022, it has 64,322 inhabitants.

The town was established in 1847 to be settled primarily by German immigrants from the Hunsrück region of southwest Germany. The local language was Riograndenser Hunsrückisch for most of its history, and it is still spoken there after 150 years of the initial settlement. Today, however, Portuguese prevails, mostly as a result of the campaign of the "Nacionalização" (Nationalization) forcefully imposed on all German and Italian settled areas of southern Brazil by president and dictator Getúlio Vargas in the 1940s.

== Railway connection ==
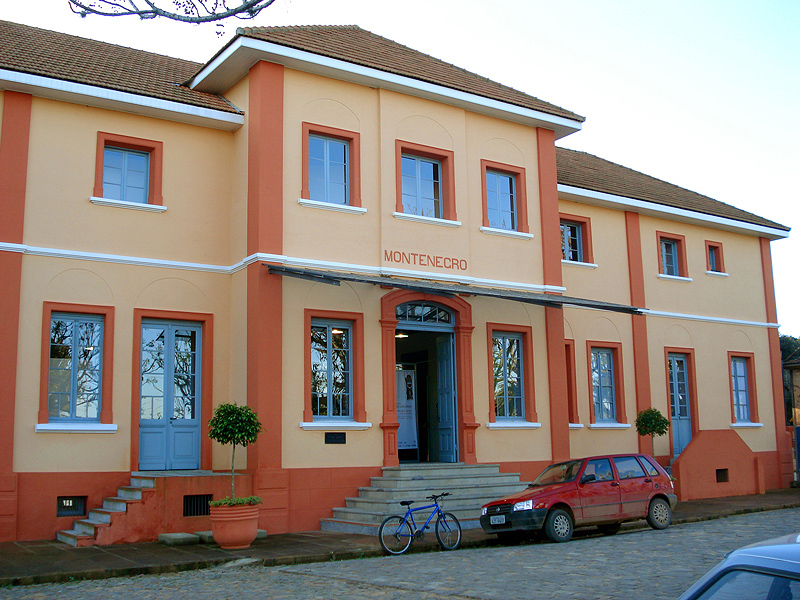
The former railway station is to be converted into a "Cultural Center".

In 1909 a new railway line connected Montenegro to São Leopoldo, which led to a quickening of economic development both in Montenegro itself and in other regional municipalities such as Maratá, Salvador do Sul and Barão. The railway was extended in 1932 and again in 1950, but at the end of the 1960s it was closed. It was subsequently decided to convert the former railway station into a "Cultural Center".

== Distinguished sons and daughters ==
Cardinal Cláudio Hummes, one of the candidates to the Catholic Church papacy in April 2005, was born in the area. On July 2, 2008, Pope Benedict XVI erected the new Roman Catholic Diocese of Montenegro, making it a Suffragan See in the province of the metropolitan archdiocese of Porto Alegre, from whose territory it was taken.

== See also ==
- List of municipalities in Rio Grande do Sul
