= List of airports by ICAO code: SJ =

List of airports by ICAO code: A - B - C - D - EB-EG - EH-EY - FA-FM - FN-FZ - G - H - ~~I~~ - J - KA-KH - KI-KP - KR-KZ - LA-LJ - LK-LZ - M - N - O - P - Q - R - SA-SC - SD-SH - SI - SJ - SK-SM - SN-SP - SQ - SS-SU - SV-SY - T - U - V - W - ~~X~~ - Y - Z

== SJ - Brazil ==
Also see airport category and list.

ICAO	IATA	Airport name	Community	Coordinates	Notes
SJAA		Araguari Farm Aerodrome	Gaúcha do Norte, Mato Grosso	13°20′33″S 053°57′17″W	
SJAB		Helisul Cataratas Heliport	Foz do Iguaçu, Paraná	25°41′34″S 054°25′57″W	
SJAC		Citropar Aerodrome	Capitão Poço, Pará	01°50′26″S 047°11′04″W	
SJAD		Tecno Bag Heliport	Lorena, São Paulo	22°45′25″S 045°06′34″W	
SJAE		Dr. Jayme Santos Neves State Hospital Heliport	Serra, Espírito Santo	20°12′04″S 040°13′41″W	
SJAF		Santo Antônio das Furnas Aerodrome	Santo Antônio de Leverger, Mato Grosso	16°58′54″S 054°57′18″W	
SJAG		Santa Cruz Farm Heliport	Araras, São Paulo	22°16′23″S 047°18′29″W	
SJAH		Gesso Integral Farm Aerodrome	Grajaú, Maranhão	05°46′26″S 046°09′53″W	
SJAI		Davilândia Farm Aerodrome	Montividiu do Norte, Goiás	13°11′06″S 048°45′01″W	
SJAJ		Estação Convention Centre Heliport	Curitiba, Paraná	25°26′20″S 049°16′04″W	
SJAK		Aerobako Aerodrome	Sinop, Mato Grosso	11°55′02″S 055°26′04″W	
SJAL		Lagoa Grande Aerodrome	Iramaia, Bahia	13°24′14″S 041°00′43″W	
SJAM		Lajota Estate Heliport	Mairiporã, São Paulo	23°14′54″S 046°34′16″W	
SJAN		Grupo Santander Banespa–Panamérica Park Heliport	São Paulo, São Paulo	23°39′13″S 046°43′31″W	
SJAO		Natura Heliport	Cajamar, São Paulo	23°24′15″S 046°49′54″W	
SJAP		Marjan Heliport	Valinhos, São Paulo	22°54′51″S 046°59′06″W	
SJAQ		Renascença Farm Aerodrome	Uruana de Minas, Minas Gerais	16°07′01″S 046°21′16″W	
SJAR		Araçatuba Farm Aerodrome	Nova Crixás, Goiás	14°31′48″S 050°24′40″W	
SJAS		São Roque Farm Aerodrome	Reginópolis São Paulo	21°39′37″S 049°09′52″W	
SJAT		Monte Moriá Heliport	Campinas, São Paulo	22°53′13″S 046°52′17″W	
SJAU		Araguacema Airport	Araguacema, Tocantins	08°50′16″S 049°33′28″W	
SJAV		Aerocéu Aviação Agrícola Aerodrome	Chapadão do Céu, Goiás	18°23′20″S 052°39′12″W	
SJAW		Citrícola Farm Aerodrome	Gavião Peixoto, São Paulo	21°43′28″S 048°22′38″W	
SJAX		Helisul Afonso Pena Heliport	São José dos Pinhais, Paraná	25°32′13″S 049°10′46″W	
SJAY		Alphaville Araçagy Heliport	Paço do Lumiar, Maranhão	02°28′12″S 044°10′26″W	
SJAZ		Querubim Farm Aerodrome	São Desidério, Bahia	12°46′13″S 046°01′22″W	
SJBA		Beatriz Farm Aerodrome	Campo Grande, Mato Grosso do Sul	21°29′14″S 053°37′02″W	
SJBB		Bacaba Farm Aerodrome	Caseara, Tocantins	09°31′30″S 049°53′12″W	
SJBC		União Farm Aerodrome	Cumaru do Norte, Pará	08°59′24″S 051°12′54″W	
SJBD		Mundo Plaza Heliport	Salvador, Bahia	12°58′47″S 038°27′41″W	
SJBE		Ortosintese Heliport	São Paulo, São Paulo	23°26′20″S 046°43′28″W	Closed
SJBF		Santa Bárbara Farm Aerodrome	Manga, Minas Gerais	14°37′04″S 044°11′17″W	
SJBG		Birmann 31 Heliport	São Paulo, São Paulo	23°35′24″S 046°40′55″W	
SJBH		Canaã Farm Aerodrome	Canarana, Mato Grosso	12°48′04″S 052°31′35″W	
SJBI		Scoda Heliport	Ipeúna, São Paulo	22°26′25″S 047°41′54″W	
SJBJ		Guancan Heliport	Cotia, São Paulo	23°36′47″S 046°51′05″W	
SJBK		Iriri Aerodrome	Altamira, Pará	05°40′45″S 054°14′42″W	
SJBL		São José Farm Heliport	Rio Claro, São Paulo	22°19′50″S 047°29′21″W	
SJBM		Quinta São José Heliport	Porto Feliz, São Paulo	23°21′41″S 047°34′07″W	
SJBN		Nossa Senhora Aparecida Aerodrome	Rio Maria, Pará	07°21′06″S 050°22′34″W	
SJBO		EZ Towers B Heliport	São Paulo, São Paulo	23°37′38″S 046°42′06″W	
SJBP		Atrium VI Heliport	São Paulo, São Paulo	23°35′44″S 046°41′15″W	
SJBQ		CBMM Heliport	Araxá, Minas Gerais	19°40′33″S 046°54′14″W	Closed
SJBR		Santa Rita Farm Aerodrome	Figueirópolis, Tocantins	12°14′39″S 048°58′12″W	
SJBS		São José dos Campos Heliport	São José dos Campos, São Paulo	23°12′41″S 045°54′01″W	
SJBT		Vera Lúcia Farm Aerodrome	Aquidauana, Mato Grosso do Sul	19°34′28″S 056°05′58″W	
SJBU		Alto Jaborandi Farm Aerodrome	Jaborandi, Bahia	14°41′34″S 045°58′55″W	
SJBV		Rio Verde Mercosul Heliport	Campo Largo, Paraná	25°27′27″S 049°27′53″W	
SJBW		Berge Vile Aerodrome	São Leopoldo, Rio Grande do Sul	29°43′59″S 051°12′35″W	
SJBX		Severino Lopes Aerodrome	São José de Mipibu, Rio Grande do Norte	06°01′08″S 035°14′28″W	
SJBY		João Silva Airport	Santa Inês, Maranhão	03°39′16″S 045°20′43″W	
SJBZ		Três Barras Farm Aerodrome	Itarumã, Goiás	18°57′33″S 051°06′36″W	
SJCA		Comandante Vittório Bonomi Aerodrome	Mococa, São Paulo	21°31′54″S 047°02′49″W	
SJCB		Classic Heliport	São Paulo, São Paulo	23°30′49″S 046°44′03″W	Closed
SJCC		Serrana Farm Aerodrome	Correntina, Bahia	13°55′51″S 046°13′52″W	
SJCD		Vitassay Condominium Heliport	Boituva, São Paulo	23°18′27″S 047°39′49″W	Closed
SJCE		Convem Heliport	Magé, Rio de Janeiro	22°39′37″S 043°09′30″W	
SJCF		J.F.M. Demito Aerodrome	Palmas, Tocantins	10°06′29″S 048°19′35″W	
SJCG		Iate Clube de Santos Heliport	Angra dos Reis, Rio de Janeiro	22°58′41″S 044°26′01″W	
SJCH		Fernando João Pereira dos Santos Filho Aerodrome	Brejo da Madre de Deus, Pernambuco	08°09′28″S 036°10′54″W	
SJCI		Police Captain Paulo José de Menezes Filho Heliport	São José dos Campos, São Paulo	23°11′40″S 045°52′27″W	
SICJ		Carajás Farm Aerodrome	Sapezal, Mato Grosso	13°24′16″S 058°46′20″W	
SJCK		Colombo I Heliport	Santa Adélia, São Paulo	21°14′52″S 048°48′37″W	
SJCL		Comando Piloto Heliport	São José do Rio Pardo, São Paulo	21°36′59″S 046°52′31″W	
SJCM		Catuleve Aerodrome	Aquiraz, Ceará	03°56′22″S 038°22′45″W	
SJCN		Jacuba Farm Aerodrome	Mineiros, Goiás	17°52′55″S 053°02′13″W	
SJCO		Castello 54 Heliport	Araçariguama, São Paulo	23°25′51″S 047°06′42″W	
SJCP		São Roberto Farm Aerodrome	Paraúna, Goiás	17°04′04″S 050°50′44″W	
SJCQ		Serra Azul Farm Aerodrome	Baixa Grande, Bahia	11°56′08″S 040°02′59″W	
SJCR		Rebeca Farm Aerodrome	Brejolândia, Bahia	12°40′58″S 043°52′17″W	
SJCS		Santa Carmem Farm Aerodrome	Porto Velho, Rondônia	09°43′11″S 065°08′40″W	
SJCT		3 Tentos CETEC Heliport	Santa Bárbara do Sul, Rio Grande do Sul	28°23′13″S 053°15′24″W	
SJCU		SJ Agropecuária Aerodrome	Correntina, Bahia	13°41′40″S 045°53′20″W	
SJCV		Roots Heliport	Camanducaia, Minas Gerais	22°51′54″S 046°02′12″W	
SJCW		Jatapu Airport	Urucará, Amazonas	01°42′43″S 058°30′40″W	
SJCX		Visual Farm Heliport	Esmeraldas, Minas Gerais	19°38′32″S 044°21′50″W	
SJCY		Abelha Estate Aerodrome	Cuiabá, Mato Grosso	15°40′49″S 055°57′20″W	
SJCZ		Cascata Farm Aerodrome	Ipiranga do Norte, Mato Grosso	11°37′46″S 055°54′18″W	
SJDA		Rio 2 Fly Heliport	Rio de Janeiro, Rio de Janeiro	23°00′51″S 043°30′00″W	
SJDB		Santa Elisa Farm Aerodrome	Britânia, Goiás	15°03′21″S 051°21′50″W	
SJDC		Vale Verde Farm Aerodrome	Pium, Tocantins	09°57′28″S 049°45′17″W	
SJDD		Jardim das Perdizes Heliport	São Paulo, São Paulo	23°31′12″S 046°40′48″W	
SJDE		União Farm Aerodrome	Jateí, Mato Grosso do Sul	22°38′39″S 054°05′51″W	
SJDF		Futura Farm Aerodrome	Brasilândia de Minas, Minas Gerais	16°56′49″S 046°11′39″W	
SJDG		Jorge de Barros Carvalho Aerodrome	Salto Grande, São Paulo	22°53′15″S 049°53′29″W	
SJDH		Mãe d'Água Farm Heliport	Petrópolis, Rio de Janeiro	22°25′43″S 043°05′12″W	Closed
SJDI		Ipiranga Farm Aerodrome	Loanda, Paraná	22°55′05″S 053°04′06″W	
SJDJ		São José Farm Aerodrome	Camapuã, Mato Grosso do Sul	19°05′42″S 053°30′14″W	
SJDK		Oeste Plaza Shopping-MC Heliport	Andradina, São Paulo	20°53′05″S 051°22′09″W	
SJDL		Paraíso Farm Aerodrome	Corumbá, Mato Grosso do Sul	17°18′28″S 055°50′43″W	
SJDM		Jarinã Farm Aerodrome	Peixoto de Azevedo, Mato Grosso	10°19′31″S 053°35′09″W	
SJDN		Campo Alegre Farm Aerodrome	Aquidauana, Mato Grosso do Sul	19°27′22″S 055°44′27″W	
SJDO		Maroum Heliport	Ilhabela, São Paulo	23°49′19″S 045°22′17″W	
SJDP		My Way Heliport	Angra dos Reis, Rio de Janeiro	23°00′53″S 044°17′14″W	
SJDQ		Trade Tower Heliport	Campinas, São Paulo	22°53′51″S 047°02′49″W	
SJDR		Duas Rodas Heliport	Jaraguá do Sul, Santa Catarina	26°29′12″S 049°03′53″W	
SJDS		Dias Branco Aerodrome	Eusébio, Ceará	03°55′02″S 038°29′21″W	
SJDT		São Roque Farm Aerodrome	Aquidauana, Mato Grosso do Sul	19°31′06″S 055°18′43″W	
SJDU		Our Lady of Loreto Aerodrome	Uruguaiana, Rio Grande do Sul	29°43′41″S 056°57′37″W	
SJDV		Redenção Farm Aerodrome	Aquidauana, Mato Grosso do Sul	19°36′43″S 056°43′51″W	Closed
SJDW		Carandá Farm Aerodrome	Caracol, Mato Grosso do Sul	22°07′19″S 057°17′28″W	
SJDX		Bandeirantes Farm Aerodrome	Aquidauana, Mato Grosso do Sul	19°24′44″S 055°32′58″W	
SJDY		Fazenda da Barra Aerodrome	Camapuã, Mato Grosso do Sul	18°39′47″S 054°04′07″W	
SJDZ		Cidade Empresarial Heliport	Aparecida de Goiânia, Goiás	16°45′00″S 049°18′17″W	
SJEA		Cadete 56–147 Santana Aerodrome	Palmeirópolis, Tocantins	12°51′00″S 048°13′31″W	
SJEB		Millennium Office Park Heliport	São Paulo, São Paulo	23°35′35″S 046°41′23″W	
SJEC		Mirim Aviação Agrícola Aerodrome	Pelotas, Rio Grande do Sul	31°41′12″S 052°28′04″W	
SJED		Durametal Heliport	Maracanaú, Ceará	03°50′31″S 038°35′59″W	
SJEE		Malwee Pomerode Heliport	Pomerode, Santa Catarina	26°42′21″S 049°09′47″W	Closed
SJEF		Costa Rica Farm Aerodrome	Aquidauana, Mato Grosso do Sul	19°44′49″S 056°02′32″W	
SJEG		Esmeralda Estate Aerodrome	Corumbá, Mato Grosso do Sul	20°09′37″S 057°09′32″W	
SJEH		Clemente Verillo Aerodrome	Ribeirão Bonito, São Paulo	22°06′05″S 048°13′36″W	
SJEI		New England Heliport	São Paulo, São Paulo	23°33′09″S 046°39′42″W	
SJEJ		Estrela Farm Aerodrome	Alto Alegre, Roraima	03°22′06″N 061°13′11″W	
SJEK		Satélite Aviação Agrícola Aerodrome	Canarana, Mato Grosso	13°32′27″S 052°12′31″W	
SJEL		Santa Helena Farm Aerodrome	Cornélio Procópio, Paraná	23°20′26″S 050°35′06″W	
SJEM		Marcus Barbosa Empresarial Calhau Heliport	São Luis, Maranhão	02°29′35″S 044°16′29″W	
SJEN		Plá e Silva Aerodrome	Santa Vitória do Palmar, Rio Grande do Sul	33°08′38″S 052°58′35″W	
SJEO		Modelo II Heliport	Ribas do Rio Pardo, Mato Grosso do Sul	21°09′08″S 053°16′53″W	
SJEP		Parque do Peão Heliport	Barretos, São Paulo	20°30′32″S 048°36′00″W	
SJEQ		Cristal Farm Aerodrome	Corumbá, Mato Grosso do Sul	17°51′47″S 055°42′28″W	
SJER		Canadá Farm Aerodrome	Acreúna, Goiás	17°21′31″S 050°20′17″W	
SJES		Main Estate Heliport	Guarulhos, São Paulo	23°27′29″S 046°28′18″W	
SJET		Baltt Heliport	Penha, Santa Catarina	26°47′35″S 048°40′16″W	
SJEU		Unifique Heliport	Timbó, Santa Catarina	26°49′10″S 049°16′21″W	
SJEV		Evanderto Almeida Aerodrome	Assaré, Ceará	06°59′21″S 039°50′39″W	
SJEW		Usina Santa Helena Aerodrome	Nova Andradina, Mato Grosso do Sul	21°58′34″S 053°24′59″W	
SJEX		Vitória Farm Aerodrome	São Desidério, Bahia	13°00′38″S 046°06′28″W	
SJEY		Eurofarma Laboratórios S.A. Heliport	Itapevi, São Paulo	23°31′08″S 046°57′39″W	
SJEZ		República dos Palmares Heliport	Maceió, Alagoas	09°39′35″S 035°44′26″W	
SJFA		Norfil Aerodrome	São Desidério, Bahia	12°55′00″S 045°43′21″W	
SJFB		Bacuri Farm Aerodrome	Riachão, Maranhão	08°22′58″S 046°26′32″W	
SJFC		São Paulo State Trade Federation Heliport	São Paulo, São Paulo	23°33′30″S 046°39′08″W	
SJFD		Méier Medical Centre Heliport	Rio de Janeiro, Rio de Janeiro	22°53′57″S 043°16′53″W	
SJFE		Jacumã Ocean Resort Condominium Heliport	Porto Seguro, Bahia	16°42′20″S 039°06′33″W	
SJFF		Frigo Estrela Aerodrome	Estrela d'Oeste, São Paulo	20°17′44″S 050°24′40″W	
SJFG		Fartura Farm Aerodrome	Campo Verde, Mato Grosso	15°07′18″S 054°56′26″W	
SJFH		IIJO Rosário Heliport	Guaíra, São Paulo	20°24′45″S 048°13′02″W	
SJFI		JAD Farm Aerodrome	Santa Rita do Tocantins, Tocantins	10°57′16″S 048°59′40″W	
SJFJ		Jaraguá Farm Aerodrome	Terenos, Mato Grosso do Sul	20°29′59″S 054°48′29″W	
SJFK		Cachoeira Farm Aerodrome	Araguaçu, Tocantins	12°35′28″S 049°31′30″W	
SJFL		Campo Formoso Farm Aerodrome	Sandolândia, Tocantins	12°33′42″S 049°51′56″W	
SJFM		Macuco Farm Aerodrome	Eldorado, Mato Grosso do Sul	23°50′09″S 054°13′53″W	
SJFN		Brasil Novo Farm Aerodrome	Coxim, Mato Grosso do Sul	18°22′18″S 054°55′44″W	
SJFO		Sorriso Farm Aerodrome	Mossâmedes, Goiás	16°09′53″S 050°08′19″W	
SJFP		Pensamento Farm Aerodrome	Corumbá, Mato Grosso do Sul	20°07′40″S 057°39′05″W	
SJFQ		Quatrirmãs Farm Aerodrome	Botucatu, São Paulo	22°56′56″S 048°39′54″W	
SJFR		Trancoso Rio Frade Aerodrome	Porto Seguro, Bahia	16°35′08″S 039°14′09″W	
SJFS		Dr. José Frota Institute Heliport	Fortaleza, Ceará	03°44′05″S 038°31′54″W	
SJFT		Triunfo do Rio Turvo Farm Aerodrome	Nova Bandeirantes, Mato Grosso	10°05′35″S 057°43′37″W	
SJFU		Tabuleiro Aerodrome	Bananeiras, Paraíba	06°41′39″S 035°37′49″W	
SJFV		Gaia Farm Aerodrome	Monte Alegre de Minas, Minas Gerais	18°45′59″S 048°45′17″W	
SJFW		São Francisco Farm Aerodrome	São Francisco de Goiás, Goiás	15°51′14″S 049°14′40″W	
SJFX		Cypi Farm Aerodrome	Corumbá, Mato Grosso do Sul	19°20′06″S 056°54′15″W	
SJFY		Flamingo Farm Aerodrome	Campo Novo do Parecis, Mato Grosso	13°51′05″S 057°56′41″W	
SJFZ		Miraflores Heliport	Boa Vista, Roraima	02°50′25″N 060°39′06″W	
SJGA		Getúlio Vargas University Hospital Heliport	Manaus, Amazonas	03°06′58″S 060°01′09″W	
SJGB		São Gabriel Farm Aerodrome	Curvelo, Minas Gerais	18°57′53″S 044°16′19″W	
SJGC		Busato I Farm Aerodrome	São Desidério, Bahia	12°54′06″S 045°30′00″W	
SJGD		Rio Brilhante Farm Aerodrome	São Desidério, Bahia	12°48′12″S 045°43′25″W	
SJGE		United Nations Aerodrome	Itaituba, Pará	06°04′52″S 056°17′38″W	
SJGF		Irmãos Garcia Farm Aerodrome	Campo Novo do Parecis, Mato Grosso	13°45′16″S 057°54′14″W	
SJGG		Haras MTostes Heliport	Itabirito, Minas Gerais	20°13′34″S 043°42′35″W	
SJGH		Aeropel Aerodrome	São Borja, Rio Grande do Sul	28°42′39″S 055°59′22″W	
SJGI		Itiquira Farm Aerodrome	Itiquira, Mato Grosso	17°26′10″S 054°09′52″W	
SJGJ		Sítio São Jorge Aerodrome	Itapeva, São Paulo	23°56′34″S 048°56′37″W	
SJGK		Guaratiba Helicentre Heliport	Rio de Janeiro, Rio de Janeiro	22°59′40″S 043°32′50″W	
SJGL		Comandante Zequinha	Luziânia, Goiás	16°40′18″S 048°00′37″W	
SJGM		Quadra Hungria Heliport	São Paulo, São Paulo	23°34′30″S 046°41′46″W	
SJGN		Agromar Farm Aerodrome	São José do Rio Claro, Mato Grosso	13°40′05″S 056°28′54″W	
SJGO		AGO Heliport	Rio de Janeiro, Rio de Janeiro	22°58′17″S 043°21′46″W	
SJGP		Guarapá Heliport	Santos, São Paulo	23°53′55″S 046°18′14″W	
SJGQ		Ledware Heliport	Cruzeiro, São Paulo	22°34′26″S 044°58′08″W	Closed
SJGR		Santa Maria Aerodrome	Flores de Goiás, Goiás	14°48′12″S 046°39′25″W	
SJGS		Aerosigma Helicentre Heliport	Bocaiúva do Sul, Paraná	25°15′25″S 049°08′37″W	
SJGT		Salto Augusto Aerodrome	Apiacás, Mato Grosso	08°53′34″S 058°32′59″W	
SJGU		Araguatins Airport	Araguatins, Tocantins	05°41′09″S 048°06′51″W	
SJGV		Toca Aerodrome	Santo Antônio de Goiás, Goiás	16°27′45″S 049°13′42″W	
SJGW		São Geraldo Farm Aerodrome	Couto de Magalhães, Tocantins	08°18′53″S 048°58′37″W	
SJGX		Gutierrez Heliport	Sete Lagoas, Minas Gerais	19°27′19″S 044°22′35″W	
SJGY		Barriguda Farm Aerodrome	São Domingos, Goiás	13°42′30″S 046°44′37″W	
SJGZ		Araçatuba Farm Aerodrome	Anaurilândia, Mato Grosso do Sul	22°05′24″S 052°40′30″W	
SJHA		Coração–Unidade Santa Alice Hospital Heliport	Londrina, Paraná	23°20′28″S 051°09′48″W	
SJHB		Real Hospital Português Heliport	Recife, Pernambuco	08°03′51″S 034°53′53″W	
SJHC		Canal Heliport	Cabo Frio, Rio de Janeiro	22°52′19″S 042°00′41″W	
SJHD		Josidith Aerodrome	Darcinópolis, Tocantins	06°49′55″S 047°49′04″W	
SJHE		Palmeira Farm Aerodrome	Ipiranga do Norte, Mato Grosso	12°05′17″S 055°59′34″W	
SJHF		Aníbal Azevedo Filho Aerodrome	Mata de São João, Bahia	12°33′13″S 038°18′53″W	
SJHG	CFO	Confresa Airport	Confresa, Mato Grosso	10°38′01″S 051°34′02″W	
SJHH		Poruína Farm Aerodrome	Serranópolis, Goiás	18°07′11″S 052°13′02″W	
SJHI		Flow Water Heliport	Campos do Jordão, São Paulo	22°45′00″S 045°31′58″W	
SJHJ		São João Farm Aerodrome	Baixa Grande do Ribeiro, Piauí	08°22′24″S 045°08′16″W	
SJHK		Santa Maria do Porto da Capivara Farm Aerodrome	Barão de Melgaço, Mato Grosso	17°08′40″S 056°35′52″W	
SJHL		Helinorte Heliport	Marabá, Pará	05°21′46″S 049°04′08″W	
SJHM		Marques Plaza Hotel Heliport	Pouso Alegre, Minas Gerais	22°13′07″S 045°55′01″W	
SJHN		Meio Século Farm Aerodrome	Itaquiraí, Mato Grosso do Sul	23°16′51″S 054°11′10″W	
SJHO		Colorado Farm Aerodrome	Diamantino, Mato Grosso	13°57′05″S 057°06′20″W	
SJHP		Portal Piçarras Heliport	Balneário Piçarras, Santa Catarina	26°46′56″S 048°41′19″W	
SJHQ		São José das Reunidas Farm Aerodrome	São José do Xingu, Mato Grosso	11°00′42″S 052°22′06″W	
SJHR		Flamboyant Heliport	Paço do Lumiar, Maranhão	02°31′13″S 044°08′14″W	
SJHS		São Vicente Farm Aerodrome	Uberlândia, Mato Grosso	19°18′38″S 048°20′35″W	
SJHT		JT Santana Farm Heliport	Valinhos, São Paulo	23°02′21″S 047°02′52″W	
SJHU		Brasilândia do Guaporé Farm Aerodrome	Comodoro, Mato Grosso	13°52′43″S 060°05′47″W	
SJHV		Granja 4 Irmãos–Taim Aerodrome	Rio Grande, Rio Grande do Sul	32°15′50″S 052°34′02″W	
SJHW		Professor Maurício Joppert Aerodrome	Engenheiro Navarro, Minas Gerais	17°17′44″S 043°57′32″W	
SJHX		Ouro Verde Farm Aerodrome	Unaí, Minas Gerais	16°35′40″S 047°17′30″W	
SJHY		Unimed Betim Hospital Heliport	Betim, Minas Gerais	19°57′31″S 044°10′14″W	
SJHZ		Arara Azul Aerodrome	Barão de Melgaço, Mato Grosso	17°00′21″S 056°27′34″W	
SJIA		Ipiaú Heliport	Itagibá, Bahia	14°09′14″S 039°42′01″W	
SJIB		Itabuna Heliport	Itabuna, Bahia	14°49′27″S 039°19′13″W	
SJIC		Pedro da Costa Lima Aerodrome	Santa Rita do Pardo, Mato Grosso do Sul	21°14′42″S 052°46′10″W	
SJID		Bonfim Farm Heliport	Lagarto, Sergipe	11°00′53″S 037°38′10″W	
SJIE		Vela Velha Official Residence Heliport	Vila Velha, Espírito Santo	20°19′38″S 040°16′09″W	
SJIF		Grupo Scheffer Aerodrome	Sapezal, Mato Grosso	13°33′02″S 058°51′37″W	
SJIG		Times Square Business Building Heliport	Ribeirão Preto, São Paulo	21°12′23″S 047°48′38″W	
SJIH		São Pedro Grand Hotel Heliport	Águas de São Pedro, São Paulo	22°35′56″S 047°52′52″W	
SJII		Silva Jardim Heliport	São Bernardo do Campo, São Paulo	23°42′48″S 046°32′49″W	
SJIJ		2J Farm Aerodrome	Novo São Joaquim, Mato Grosso	14°48′55″S 052°54′34″W	
SJIL		Brigadeiro Fábio Pereira da Silveira Aerodrome	Tupaciguara, Minas Gerais	18°36′37″S 048°43′10″W	
SJIM		Minas Gerais Military Police Heliport	Juíz de Fora, Minas Gerais	21°44′13″S 043°21′52″W	
SJIN		Lagoa Baia da Saudade Farm Aerodrome	Cocalinho, Mato Grosso	14°27′40″S 051°04′53″W	
SJIO		Tech Office Heliport	São Luís, Maranhão	02°29′27″S 044°18′11″W	
SJIP		Ipiranga Logistic Centre Heliport	Guarulhos, São Paulo	23°25′11″S 046°22′37″W	
SJIQ		Haras Larissa Heliport	Sumaré, São Paulo	22°53′29″S 047°18′33″W	
SJIR		Engenheiro Joaquim Martins Aerodrome	Iramaia, Bahia	13°18′40″S 040°52′41″W	
SJIS		Annalu Farm Aerodrome	Deodápolis, Mato Grosso do Sul	22°04′56″S 054°12′04″W	
SJIT		Itau de Minas Airport	Itau de Minas, Minas Gerais	20°45′19″S 046°45′01″W	Closed
SJIU		Caregi Farm Aerodrome	Ipiranga do Norte, Mato Grosso	12°12′52″S 055°59′14″W	
SJIV		Veneza Farm Aerodrome	Caseara, Tocantins	09°20′18″S 049°53′16″W	
SJIW		Helicentre Alphaville Heliport	Santana de Parnaíba, São Paulo	23°28′31″S 046°49′43″W	
SJIX		Marina Porto Imperial Heliport	Paraty, Rio de Janeiro	23°13′51″S 044°42′56″W	
SJIY		Iaciara Farm Aerodrome	Iaciara, Goiás	14°08′29″S 046°41′03″W	
SJIZ		Cafenápolis Farm Aerodrome	Eunápolis, Bahia	16°11′44″S 039°31′03″W	
SJJA		André Sampaio Heliport	Palmeiras, Bahia	12°39′07″S 041°29′26″W	
SJJB		Barra Mansa Farm Aerodrome	Brasilândia, Mato Grosso do Sul	20°46′07″S 052°46′43″W	
SJJC		Cachoeira Farm Aerodrome	Ponta Porã, Mato Grosso do Sul	22°30′01″S 055°21′39″W	
SJJD		Cerro Porã Farm Aerodrome	Porto Murtinho, Mato Grosso do Sul	22°02′05″S 057°28′09″W	
SJJE		Jequié Heliport	Jequié, Bahia	13°50′25″S 040°06′11″W	
SJJF		Rio Roosevelt Inn Aerodrome	Novo Aripuanã, Amazonas	08°29′42″S 060°57′20″W	
SJJG		Santa Bárbara Farm Aerodrome	Corumbá, Mato Grosso do Sul	19°05′28″S 055°50′33″W	
SJJH		Juína Farm Aerodrome	Campos de Júlio, Mato Grosso	13°26′23″S 059°15′25″W	
SJJI		São José Farm Aerodrome	Matupá, Mato Grosso	10°13′09″S 054°47′32″W	
SJJJ		Aeroxingu Aerodrome	Altamira, Pará	03°10′08″S 052°11′25″W	
SJJK		Taquaral Farm Aerodrome	Alta Floresta, Mato Grosso	10°01′44″S 056°44′18″W	
SJJL		Campo Aberto Farm Aerodrome	Barreiras, Bahia	11°47′18″S 045°57′53″W	
SJJM		São João Farm Aerodrome	Matupá, Mato Grosso	10°19′42″S 054°34′52″W	
SJJN		Shangri-lá Farm Aerodrome	Alta Floresta, Mato Grosso	10°16′58″S 056°19′32″W	
SJJO		João de Oliveira Bueno Aerodrome	Monte Alegre de Goiás, Goiás	13°11′33″S 047°06′56″W	
SJJP		Posto O Fazendeiro Heliport	Miracatu, São Paulo	24°15′24″S 047°22′44″W	
SJJQ		Apóstolo Simão Coffee Farm Aerodrome	Rio Pardo de Minas, Minas Gerais	15°43′14″S 042°24′25″W	
SJJR		Recreio Farm Aerodrome	Andrelândia, Minas Gerais	21°42′47″S 044°12′12″W	
SJJS		BS Colway Heliport	Piraquara, Paraná	25°27′41″S 049°06′10″W	
SJJT		Pampili Farm Aerodrome	Três Lagoas, Mato Grosso do Sul	20°06′48″S 052°32′44″W	
SJJU		Barra Mansa Farm Aerodrome	Nova Lacerda, Mato Grosso	14°02′40″S 060°09′17″W	
SJJV		Primavera Farm Aerodrome	Campo Grande, Mato Grosso do Sul	20°58′29″S 054°19′44″W	
SJJW		Canamari Farm Aerodrome	Quirinópolis, Goiás	18°32′53″S 050°22′52″W	
SJJX		Porto Conceição Aerodrome	Porto Murtinho, Mato Grosso do Sul	21°29′37″S 057°55′31″W	
SJJY		Indaiaúba Heliport	Ilhabela, São Paulo	23°54′32″S 045°18′33″W	
SJJZ		Ilha de Terrapleno Heliport	Rio Grande, Rio Grande do Sul	32°01′58″S 052°04′22″W	
SJKA		Aerocampo Aerodrome	Campo Novo do Parecis, Mato Grosso	13°37′41″S 057°54′03″W	
SJKB		Adelaide Farm Aerodrome	Brasnorte, Mato Grosso	13°05′15″S 058°01′33″W	
SJKC		Kikretum Village Aerodrome	Ourilândia do Norte, Pará	07°07′52″S 051°39′11″W	
SJKD		Helisilva Heliport	Balneário Camboriú, Santa Catarina	27°01′35″S 048°37′16″W	
SJKE		Kedjêrêkrã Village Aerodrome	São Félix do Xingu, Pará	07°48′46″S 052°09′06″W	
SJKF		Lago Azul Heliport	Araçoiaba da Serra, São Paulo	23°30′32″S 047°34′57″W	
SJKG		Chapada Grande Farm Aerodrome	Regeneração, Piauí	06°20′56″S 042°28′32″W	
SJKH		Angical Farm Heliport	Nordestina, Bahia	10°54′14″S 039°25′13″W	
SJKI		Comandante Salomão Alcolumbre Aerodrome	Macapá, Amapá	00°12′32″N 051°00′46″W	
SJKJ		Siriema Farm Aerodrome	Campos de Júlio, Mato Grosso	13°33′41″S 059°15′58″W	
SJKK		Sérgio Bonifácio Aerodrome	Ivaiporã, Paraná	24°15′49″S 051°38′23″W	
SJKL		Canã Aerodrome	Normandia, Roraima	04°37′08″N 060°04′18″W	
SJKM		Canawapai	Uiramutã, Roraima	04°48′29″N 060°01′20″W	
SJKN		Caracanã Aerodrome	Uiramutã, Roraima	04°42′17″N 060°15′55″W	
SJKO		Cararuau Aerodrome	Normandia, Roraima	04°03′47″N 060°09′54″W	
SJKP		Caraparu Aerodrome	Uiramutã, Roraima	04°32′28″N 060°27′47″W	
SJKQ		Caramambatai (Mapae) Aerodrome	Uiramutã, Roraima	05°07′23″N 060°35′09″W	
SJKR		Russi e Russi 2 Heliport	Porto Belo, Santa Catarina	27°08′40″S 048°35′32″W	
SJKS		Catrimani I Aerodrome	Iracema, Roraima	02°22′32″N 063°00′30″W	
SJKT		Contão Aerodrome	Pacaraima, Roraima	04°10′18″N 060°32′37″W	
SJKU		Cumaipá Aerodrome	Uiramutã, Roraima	04°48′50″N 060°28′25″W	
SJKV		Cumanã 1 Aerodrome	Pacaraima, Roraima	04°28′13″N 060°46′41″W	
SJKW		Cumanã 2 Aerodrome	Pacaraima, Roraima	04°25′37″N 060°49′26″W	
SJKX		Cutia Aerodrome	Uiramutã, Roraima	04°10′12″N 059°44′55″W	
SJKY		Comeri Santos Heliport	Santos, São Paulo	23°57′09″S 046°19′31″W	
SJKZ		Estevão Aerodrome	Uiramutã, Roraima	04°26′59″N 060°26′21″W	
SJLA		Flechal Aerodrome	Uiramutã, Roraima	04°39′41″N 060°17′31″W	
SJLB		Chaparral Farm Aerodrome	Lambari d'Oeste, Mato Grosso	15°34′14″S 057°46′27″W	
SJLC		Hakoma Aerodrome	Alto Alegre, Roraima	02°43′12″N 063°34′03″W	
SJLD		Porto do Campo Aerodrome	Lambari d'Oeste, Mato Grosso	15°42′56″S 057°42′41″W	
SJLE		Halikato-u Aerodrome	Alto Alegre, Roraima	03°13′30″N 063°11′58″W	
SJLF		Homoxi Aerodrome	Iracema, Roraima	02°29′52″N 063°43′47″W	
SJLG		Reunidas Pedreira Farm Aerodrome	Caiapônia, Goiás	17°14′27″S 051°29′41″W	
SJLH		Jacamim Aerodrome	Bonfim, Roraima	02°10′34″N 059°47′02″W	
SJLI		Liliani Farm Aerodrome	Bom Jardim, Maranhão	04°12′49″S 046°58′30″W	
SJLJ		Jatapuzinho Aerodrome	Caroebe, Roraima	00°35′50″N 059°13′18″W	
SJLK		Lago Grande 1 Aerodrome	Boa Vista, Roraima	03°26′34″N 060°21′09″W	
SJLL		Maturuca Aerodrome	Uiramutã, Roraima	04°27′39″N 060°06′01″W	
SJLM		Leão de Ouro Aerodrome	Amajari, Roraima	04°09′06″N 061°25′40″W	Closed
SJLN		Maloquinha Aerodrome	Uiramutã, Roraima	04°43′37″N 060°35′26″W	
SJLO		Manalai Aerodrome	Uiramutã, Roraima	05°05′03″N 060°22′44″W	
SJLP		Manoá-pium Aerodrome	Bonfim, Roraima	02°58′48″N 060°05′43″W	
SJLQ		Maracanã Aerodrome	Uiramutã, Roraima	04°21′54″N 060°01′01″W	
SJLR		Cambiju Heliport	Ponta Grossa, Paraná	25°14′49″S 049°55′05″W	
SJLS		Marupá Aerodrome	Bonfim, Roraima	02°07′31″N 059°49′17″W	
SJLT		Milho Aerodrome	Boa Vista, Roraima	03°23′08″N 060°24′28″W	Closed
SJLU		Missão Catrimani Aerodrome	Caracaraí, Roraima	01°44′27″N 062°17′11″W	
SJLV		Morro Aerodrome	Uiramutã, Roraima	04°21′26″N 059°58′12″W	
SJLW		Mudubim 1 Aerodrome	Uiramutã, Roraima	04°25′18″N 060°29′23″W	
SJLX		Mutum Aerodrome	Uiramutã, Roraima	04°27′11″N 059°51′14″W	
SJLY		BH Helicentre Heliport	Nova Lima, Minas Gerais	20°02′50″S 043°57′44″W	
SJLZ		Coperjava Aerodrome	Formoso do Araguaia, Tocantins	11°50′06″S 049°42′44″W	
SJMA		Marli Farm Aerodrome	Camapuã, Mato Grosso do Sul	19°32′25″S 053°43′14″W	
SJMB		Mombaça Farm Aerodrome	Angra dos Reis, Rio de Janeiro	23°00′59″S 044°17′20″W	
SJMC		Monte Carlo Trade Centre Heliport	Barueri, São Paulo	23°29′35″S 046°51′07″W	
SJMD		Paapiú Novo Aerodrome	Iracema, Roraima	02°43′22″N 062°57′01″W	
SJME		Mato Grosso Aerodrome	Pacaraima, Roraima	04°34′14″N 060°54′11″W	
SJMF		Pacú Aerodrome	Normandia, Roraima	04°09′50″N 060°13′20″W	
SJMG		Mega Mix Heliport	São Paulo, São Paulo	23°32′09″S 046°37′07″W	
SJMH		Palimiú Aerodrome	Alto Alegre, Roraima	03°19′05″N 062°58′16″W	
SJMI		Parafuri Aerodrome	Alto Alegre, Roraima	03°17′17″N 063°50′35″W	
SJMJ		Pedra Blanca Aerodrome	Uiramutã, Roraima	04°27′26″N 060°16′04″W	
SJMK		Pedra Preta Aerodrome	Uiramutã, Roraima	04°42′47″N 060°28′35″W	
SJML		Piolho Aerodrome	Pacaraima, Roraima	04°42′05″N 060°44′01″W	
SJMM		Pipi Aerodrome	Uiramutã, Roraima	04°55′48″N 060°19′19″W	
SJMN		Raposa Aerodrome	Normandia, Roraima	03°48′36″N 060°05′25″W	
SJMO		Santa Isabel Aerodrome	Pacaraima, Roraima	04°28′12″N 060°51′45″W	
SJMP		Santa Liberdade Aerodrome	Uiramutã, Roraima	04°17′15″N 060°15′25″W	
SJMQ		Santa Maria de Normandia Aerodrome	Normandia, Roraima	04°10′13″N 060°08′16″W	
SJMR		Maragogipe Aerodrome	Iguatemi, Mato Grosso do Sul	23°27′24″S 054°18′02″W	
SJMS		Mineração Serra Grande Heliport	Crixás, Goiás	14°34′27″S 049°58′03″W	
SJMT		São Miguel Cachoeirinha Aerodrome	Pacaraima, Roraima	04°29′25″N 060°59′26″W	
SJMU		Sauparú Aerodrome	Uiramutã, Roraima	04°59′23″N 060°26′08″W	
SJMV		Serra do Sol Aerodrome	Uiramutã, Roraima	04°56′33″N 060°28′31″W	
SJMW		Socó Aerodrome	Uiramutã, Roraima	04°28′12″N 060°10′37″W	
SJMX		Suapí Aerodrome	Pacaraima, Roraima	04°34′31″N 060°51′30″W	
SJMY		Monte Rey Heliport	Caxias do Sul, Rio Grande do Sul	29°08′07″S 051°08′31″W	
SJMZ		Mizote Farm Aerodrome	São Desidério, Bahia	12°57′27″S 046°00′16″W	
SJNA		Nova Aliança Farm Aerodrome	Glicério, São Paulo	21°19′42″S 050°11′35″W	
SJNB		Ubarú Aerodrome	Pacaraima, Roraima	04°30′06″N 060°48′08″W	
SJNC		Uraricoera Aerodrome	Alto Alegre, Roraima	03°08′46″N 062°13′49″W	
SJND		Darinha Aerodrome	Cascavel, Ceará	04°06′35″S 038°14′34″W	
SJNE		Wapum Aerodrome	Caracaraí, Roraima	01°59′24″N 059°57′26″W	
SJNF		Wilimon Aerodrome	Uiramutã, Roraima	04°38′06″N 060°10′34″W	
SJNG		Xidea Aerodrome	Alto Alegre, Roraima	02°36′25″N 063°52′10″W	
SJNH		Nova Esperança Farm Aerodrome	São Félix do Xingu, Pará	09°27′01″S 052°08′18″W	
SJNI		Buriti Farm Aerodrome	Valentim Gentil, São Paulo	20°28′48″S 050°11′15″W	
SJNJ		MC Heliport	Silvânia, Goiás	16°30′07″S 048°47′34″W	
SJNK		Três Perobas Farm Aerodrome	Santa Luzia d'Oeste, Rondônia	12°04′54″S 061°38′34″W	
SJNL		Reata Farm Aerodrome	Campo Novo do Parecis, Mato Grosso	13°37′13″S 057°34′51″W	
SJNM		Santa Luzia Farm Aerodrome	Nova Mutum, Mato Grosso	13°59′38″S 055°56′27″W	
SJNN		Iporanga-Guarujá Heliport	Guarujá, São Paulo	23°53′17″S 046°10′18″W	
SJNO		Bela Nova Farm Aerodrome	Itaju do Colônia, Bahia	15°01′59″S 039°39′52″W	
SJNP	NPR	Novo Progresso Airport	Novo Progresso, Pará	07°07′34″S 055°24′04″W	
SJNQ		Destilaria Medasa Aerodrome	Caravelas, Bahia	17°29′06″S 040°09′28″W	
SJNS		Grupo Souza Lima Heliport	São Paulo, São Paulo	23°32′05″S 046°32′40″W	
SJNT		GF Taxi Aéreo Heliport	Guarujá, São Paulo	24°00′10″S 046°17′21″W	
SJNU		Campo Alto Farm Aerodrome	Ribeirão Cascalheira, Mato Grosso	13°02′20″S 051°42′47″W	
SJNV		São Francisco Farm Aerodrome	Gouvelândia, Goiás	18°25′49″S 050°15′23″W	
SJNW		Nhandu Farm Aerodrome	Novo Mundo, Mato Grosso	09°37′57″S 055°12′58″W	
SJNX		Chapadão do Céu Aerodrome	Chapadão do Céu, Goiás	18°24′16″S 052°37′37″W	
SJNY		Iberostar Praia do Forte Heliport	Mata de São João, Bahia	12°32′59″S 037°59′27″W	
SJNZ		São Jorge Farm Aerodrome	Lambari d'Oeste, Mato Grosso	15°20′54″S 058°01′45″W	
SJOA		Nossa Senhora Aparecida Farm Aerodrome	Tapurah, Mato Grosso	11°54′46″S 056°09′32″W	
SJOC		CEO Heliport	Salvador, Bahia	12°58′46″S 038°27′08″W	
SJOD		Jordão Aerodrome	Jordão, Acre	09°11′25″S 071°56′49″W	
SJOE		Haras Cachoeira Heliport	Itu, São Paulo	23°14′48″S 047°25′29″W	
SJOF		Forcela Farm Heliport	Itapecerica, Minas Gerais	20°23′52″S 045°10′47″W	
SJOG	AQM	Ariquemes Airport	Ariquemes, Rondônia	09°52′50″S 063°02′50″W	
SJOH		Destilaria Veredas Aerodrome	João Pinheiro, Minas Gerais	17°42′56″S 045°49′03″W	
SJOI		Indaiatuba Premium Office Heliport	Indaiatuba, São Paulo	23°05′42″S 047°13′22″W	
SJOJ		Simasa Aerodrome	Açailândia, Maranhão	04°52′15″S 047°23′25″W	
SJOK		Modelo Farm Aerodrome	Água Clara, Mato Grosso do Sul	19°18′56″S 052°58′36″W	
SJOL		RS Morizono Heliport	Barueri, São Paulo	23°30′29″S 046°50′10″W	Closed
SJOM		São Jerônimo Farm	Alto Garças, Mato Grosso	16°54′09″S 053°35′14″W	
SJON		Jordanésia Heliport	Cajamar, São Paulo	23°21′17″S 046°51′16″W	
SJOO		Dr. João Osmar de Oliveira Aerodrome	Comodoro, Mato Grosso	14°08′04″S 059°49′01″W	
SJOP		Panflora Farm Aerodrome	Rosário Oeste, Mato Grosso	15°05′03″S 056°33′08″W	
SJOQ		Cristália Heliport	Itapira, São Paulo	22°28′06″S 046°43′05″W	
SJOR		Onça do Barão Farm Aerodrome	Cocos, Bahia	14°12′46″S 045°12′02″W	
SJOS		Goinfra Heliport	Goiânia, Goiás	16°38′52″S 049°12′32″W	
SJOT		Oliveira Heliport	Brusque, Santa Catarina	27°06′20″S 048°56′03″W	
SJOU		Minerva Paranatinga Aerodrome	Paranatinga, Mato Grosso	14°27′43″S 054°02′05″W	
SJOV		Brazilian Equipment Company Heliport	Ribeirão Grande, São Paulo	24°08′58″S 048°20′24″W	
SJOW		Guadalupe Farm Aerodrome	Santo Antônio do Aracanguá, São Paulo	20°59′02″S 050°31′33″W	
SJOX		Alegria Farm Aerodrome	São José do Xingu, Mato Grosso	10°35′50″S 052°33′16″W	
SJOY		Jorge Luiz Stocco Aerodrome	Palmeira, Paraná	25°24′04″S 049°47′58″W	
SJOZ		Faria Lima Square Heliport	São Paulo	23°35′19″S 046°40′58″W	
SJPA		Palácio Rio Madeira Heliport	Porto Velho, Rondônia	08°44′59″S 063°54′37″W	
SJPB		Guarapiranga Golf Heliport	São Paulo, São Paulo	23°47′15″S 046°46′54″W	
SJPC		Paredão Farm Aerodrome	Comodoro, Mato Grosso	13°37′56″S 060°17′02″W	
SJPD		Riacho Verde Heliport	Bezerros, Pernambuco	08°15′22″S 035°46′21″W	
SJPE		Pedra Aerodrome	Pedra Lavrada, Paraíba	06°46′00″S 036°28′54″W	
SJPF		Foz do Iguaçu Federal Police Heliport	Foz do Iguaçu, Paraná (state)	25°31′00″S 054°34′26″W	
SJPG		Estado de Goiás Military Police Heliport	Goiânia, Goiás	16°42′16″S 049°15′29″W	
SJPH		Royal Palm Hall Heliport	Campinas, São Paulo	22°56′23″S 047°04′15″W	
SJPI		Porto Bonito Aerodrome	Itaquiraí, Mato Grosso do Sul	23°20′38″S 053°52′21″W	
SJPJ		Jundiaí Municipal Government Heliport	Jundiaí, São Paulo	23°10′17″S 046°54′01″W	
SJPK		Campo das Princesas Farm	Timon, Maranhão	05°19′20″S 042°49′45″W	
SJPL		Limão Aerodrome	Itaituba, Pará	05°44′43″S 056°23′19″W	
SJPM		Police Captain Cidimar Antunes de Almeida Heliport	Niterói, Rio de Janeiro	22°52′00″S 043°07′24″W	Closed
SJPN		Jundiá Heliport	Macaé, Rio de Janeiro	22°24′02″S 041°52′33″W	
SJPO		Xingó Aerodrome	Piranhas, Alagoas	09°35′17″S 037°46′39″W	
SJPP		Aero Rural Aerodrome	Alta Floresta, Mato Grosso	09°55′29″S 056°00′29″W	
SJPQ		Petrobrás São Sebastião Terminal Heliport	São Sebastião, São Paulo	23°47′55″S 045°24′00″W	
SJPR		Asas de Balsa Nova Aerodrome	Balsa Nova, Paraná	25°32′58″S 049°38′35″W	
SJPS		Promissão Farm Aerodrome	União do Sul, Mato Grosso	11°47′30″S 054°26′40″W	
SJPT		Quatro Ventos Aerodrome	Uberlândia, Minas Gerais	18°58′26″S 048°06′02″W	
SJPU		Piauí Ultralight Club Aerodrome	Teresina, Piauí	05°01′53″S 042°43′07″W	
SJPV		Reserva Pituba Aerodrome	Coruripe, Alagoas	10°05′01″S 036°05′10″W	
SJPW		Boa Esperança Farm Aerodrome	Lucas do Rio Verde, Mato Grosso	12°53′32″S 056°21′48″W	
SJPX		Cidade Verde Farm Aerodrome	Poxoréu, Mato Grosso	15°24′52″S 054°22′21″W	
SJPY		Ilson Mateus Rodrigues Júnior Heliport	São José de Ribamar, Maranhão	02°28′07″S 044°12′03″W	
SJPZ		Santo Antônio Farm Heliport	Matinha, Maranhão	03°06′58″S 045°00′46″W	
SJQA		Teimoso Heliport	Campo Largo, Paraná	25°25′36″S 049°31′29″W	
SJQB		Jequitibá Farm Aerodrome	Nova Alvorada do Sul, Mato Grosso do Sul	21°52′43″S 053°48′56″W	
SJQC		Jequitimar Heliport	Guarujá, São Paulo	23°58′13″S 046°11′15″W	
SJQD		Grupo Shimohira Aerodrome	Formosa do Rio Preto, Bahia	11°27′03″S 046°28′25″W	
SJQE		Sertão Central Heliport	Quixeramobim, Ceará	05°10′54″S 039°15′42″W	
SJQF		Londrina Farm Aerodrome	Campo Novo do Parecis, Mato Grosso	13°21′20″S 057°45′18″W	
SJQG		HSBC Heliport	Curitiba, Paraná	25°30′11″S 049°16′50″W	Closed
SJQH		Hospital de Clínicas Municipal Heliport	São Bernardo do Campo, São Paulo	23°43′59″S 046°34′40″W	
SJQI		Hotel Porto Jofre Aerodrome	Poconé, Mato Grosso	17°21′28″S 056°46′26″W	
SJQJ		Fortaleza Farm Aerodrome	Jaborandi, São Paulo	20°35′45″S 048°22′22″W	
SJQK		Barra do Vento Aerodrome	Boa Vista, Roraima	02°41′44″N 060°48′51″W	
SJQL		Águas Claras Aviação Agrícola Aerodrome	Santa Juliana, Minas Gerais	19°19′20″S 047°33′18″W	
SJQM		Valor Farm Heliport	Igarapé do Meio, Maranhão	03°39′03″S 045°12′10″W	
SJQN		Quirinópolis Airport	Quirinópolis, Goiás	18°26′46″S 050°24′33″W	
SJQO		Confiança Farm Aerodrome	Baixa Grande do Ribeiro, Piauí	07°56′54″S 045°05′07″W	
SJQP		Rebog Estate Aerodrome	Cocalinho, Mato Grosso	12°48′03″S 050°37′41″W	
SJQQ		Terra Alta Farm Aerodrome	Portel, Pará	02°51′33″S 050°59′20″W	
SJQR		Rincão do Céu Heliport	Igarassu, Pernambuco	07°50′46″S 034°50′56″W	
SJQS		Santa Tereza Farm Aerodrome	União do Sul, Mato Grosso	11°27′49″S 054°03′04″W	
SJQT		Haras RPC Aerodrome	Nova Lima, Minas Gerais	20°10′09″S 043°55′39″W	
SJQU		Formosa Farm Aerodrome	Formosa do Rio Preto, Bahia	10°42′10″S 045°23′21″W	Closed
SJQV		Amazon Roosevelt Inn Aerodrome	Novo Aripuanã, Amazonas	07°34′11″S 060°41′20″W	
SJQW		Warna Roos Heliport	Santa Bárbara do Sul, Rio Grande do Sul	28°10′52″S 053°13′00″W	
SJQX		Uruará Farm Aerodrome	Uruará, Pará	03°31′23″S 053°23′47″W	
SJQY		Solimões Terminal Heliport	Coari, Amazonas	03°56′39″S 063°09′49″W	
SJQZ		Peça Rara Agropecuária II Farm Aerodrome	Alta Floresta d'Oeste, Rondônia	12°25′31″S 062°08′35″W	
SJRA		P.E. Anori Heliport	Anori, Amazonas	03°42′38″S 061°39′46″W	
SJRB		VR Farm Aerodrome	Santa Cruz do Xingu, Mato Grosso	10°06′54″S 052°30′24″W	
SJRC		Serra da Borda Aerodrome	Vila Bela da Santíssima Trindade, Mato Grosso	14°49′55″S 059°41′05″W	
SJRD		Ilha Josefa Heliport	Angra dos Reis, Rio de Janeiro	23°02′27″S 044°23′31″W	
SJRE		Vila Adail Heliport	Elias Fausto, São Paulo	23°03′01″S 047°23′25″W	
SJRF		Lavalpa Heliport	Jacareí, São Paulo	23°17′37″S 045°58′30″W	Closed
SJRG	RIG	Rio Grande Regional Airport	Rio Grande, Rio Grande do Sul	32°05′01″S 052°10′04″W	Formerly SBRG
SJRH		Galheiro Farm Aerodrome	Campo Verde, Mato Grosso	15°18′52″S 054°35′49″W	
SJRI		Boa Esperança Condominium Aerodrome	Ribeiro Gonçalves, Piauí	08°24′18″S 045°27′32″W	
SJRJ		Jacaré Farm Aerodrome	Campo Grande, Mato Grosso do Sul	21°30′07″S 053°58′05″W	
SJRK		Agropecuária São Roberto Aerodrome	Santana do Araguaia, Pará	09°13′56″S 050°55′50″W	
SJRL		Ryhad Palace Hotel Heliport	Araucária, Paraná	25°34′58″S 049°23′49″W	
SJRM		Monte das Oliveiras Heliport	Santo André, São Paulo	23°39′56″S 046°31′15″W	
SJRN		Carlos Gomes Centre Heliport	Porto Alegre, Rio Grande do Sul	30°01′53″S 051°10′36″W	
SJRO		Santa Elisa Farm Aerodrome	Auriflama, São Paulo	20°31′50″S 050°38′06″W	
SJRP		Grupo Pronorte Aerodrome	Marcelândia, Mato Grosso	11°05′21″S 054°31′55″W	
SJRQ		São Camilo Pompéia Hospital Heliport	São Paulo, São Paulo	23°32′02″S 046°41′18″W	
SJRR		Barreiro Farm Aerodrome	Paraúna, Goiás	17°01′19″S 050°57′19″W	Closed
SJRS		Guanabara Farm Aerodrome	Junqueirópolis, São Paulo	21°20′37″S 051°24′12″W	
SJRT		Aero Agrícola Rio Claro Aerodrome	São José do Rio Claro, Mato Grosso	13°26′03″S 056°43′53″W	
SJRU		Terra Roxa Farm Aerodrome	Santa Maria das Barreiras, Pará	08°43′00″S 050°24′23″W	
SJRV		PCH Garganta da Jararaca Aerodrome	Nova Maringá, Mato Grosso	13°23′16″S 057°37′03″W	
SJRW		PCH Buriti Aerodrome	Paraíso das Águas, Mato Grosso do Sul	19°20′28″S 052°41′23″W	
SJRX		Praia Grande Military Police Air Wing Heliport	Praia Grande, São Paulo	24°02′03″S 046°29′37″W	
SJRY		Rio Mutuca Farm Aerodrome	Juara, Mato Grosso	10°26′08″S 058°09′46″W	
SJRZ		João Domingues de Araújo Heliport	São Paulo, São Paulo	23°36′17″S 046°41′38″W	
SJSA		Aimoré Farm Aerodrome	Juti, Mato Grosso do Sul	22°47′14″S 054°35′30″W	
SJSB		São Bento do Nabileque Farm Aerodrome	Corumbá, Mato Grosso do Sul	20°06′20″S 057°20′28″W	
SJSC		San Cyro Farm Aerodrome	Sertão, Rio Grande do Sul	27°57′17″S 052°30′28″W	
SJSD		Riacho dos Machados Mining Heliport	Riacho dos Machados, Minas Gerais	16°03′22″S 043°07′47″W	
SJSE		Serabi Aerodrome	Itaituba, Pará	06°19′05″S 055°47′39″W	
SJSF		Serrana Farm Aerodrome	Maracaju, Mato Grosso do Sul	21°08′43″S 055°21′46″W	
SJSG		Usina Serra Grande Heliport	São José da Laje, Alagoas	08°58′41″S 036°04′13″W	
SJSH		Fly Ville Aerodrome	Governador Celso Ramos, Santa Catarina	27°22′14″S 048°36′49″W	
SJSI		Transportadora Americana Heliport	São Paulo, São Paulo	23°30′54″S 046°44′18″W	
SJSJ		São Jorge Farm Aerodrome	Guaratinga, Bahia	16°20′40″S 039°41′12″W	
SJSK		Usina Calcário Parecis Aerodrome	Parecis, Rondônia	12°08′45″S 061°31′19″W	
SJSL		Sírio Libanês II Hospital Heliport	São Paulo, São Paulo	23°33′26″S 046°39′11″W	
SJSM		Chácara Marcella Aerodrome	Goioerê, Paraná	24°12′35″S 053°00′34″W	
SJSN		Carvalho Farm Aerodrome	São Luíz do Norte, Goiás	14°50′14″S 049°21′52″W	
SJSO		Divisão II Farm Aerodrome	Lucas do Rio Verde, Mato Grosso	12°58′13″S 056°19′14″W	
SJSP		Caragoatá Heliport	Paraty, Rio de Janeiro	23°14′37″S 044°35′46″W	
SJSQ		Quinta do Carangola Heliport	Petrópolis, Rio de Janeiro	22°28′17″S 043°09′19″W	
SJSR		Santa Rosa Farm Aerodrome	Mara Rosa, Goiás	13°59′37″S 049°45′24″W	
SJSS		Agrifor Aerodrome	Sorriso, Mato Grosso	12°29′55″S 055°41′46″W	
SJST		Umbará Energy Heliport	Curitiba, Paraná	25°36′14″S 049°17′37″W	
SJSU		São Marcus Farm Aerodrome	Alto Paraíso, Paraná	23°33′42″S 053°47′50″W	
SJSV		Guiné Farm Aerodrome	São Roque de Minas, Minas Gerais	20°14′53″S 046°11′30″W	
SJSW		Colinas Shopping Heliport	São José dos Campos, São Paulo	23°12′19″S 045°54′29″W	
SJSX		Montana Farm Aerodrome	Matrinchã, Goiás	15°12′59″S 050°50′12″W	
SJSY		SICPA Heliport	Rio de Janeiro, Rio de Janeiro	22°53′02″S 043°44′05″W	
SJSZ		Helbor Concept Heliport	Mogi das Cruzes, São Paulo	23°31′01″S 046°10′44″W	
SJTA		Federal Highway Police National Academy Heliport	Florianópolis, Santa Catarina	27°27′21″S 048°27′41″W	
SJTB		Buriti Farm Aerodrome	Chapada dos Guimarães, Mato Grosso	15°27′54″S 055°37′21″W	
SJTC		Itaguassu Farm Aerodrome	Antônio João, Mato Grosso do Sul	22°14′59″S 055°55′36″W	
SJTD		Plaza JK Heliport	São Paulo, São Paulo	23°35′27″S 046°41′06″W	
SJTE		Tênis Camp Heliport	Artur Nogueira, São Paulo	22°33′57″S 047°04′26″W	
SJTF		Mequens Farm Aerodrome	Alta Floresta d'Oeste, Rondônia	13°03′45″S 062°15′36″W	
SJTG		Matão Farm Aerodrome	Porto Murtinho, Mato Grosso do Sul	20°55′17″S 057°26′53″W	
SJTH		Pôr do Sol Farm Aerodrome	Cristalina, Goiás	16°14′55″S 047°22′24″W	
SJTI		Josidith Heliport	Pacajus, Ceará	04°08′26″S 038°29′18″W	
SJTJ		Jatobá Farm Aerodrome	Diamantino, Mato Grosso	14°11′16″S 057°31′10″W	
SJTK		Itakiray Farm Aerodrome	Itaquiraí, Mato Grosso do Sul	23°30′41″S 054°15′07″W	
SJTL		Morandi e Morandi Aviação Agrícola Aerodrome	Jaguapitã, Paraná	22°58′50″S 051°32′29″W	
SJTM		Santa Cecília Aerodrome	Mirandópolis, São Paulo	20°52′55″S 050°59′05″W	
SJTN		Triunfo Farm Aerodrome	Candeias do Jamari, Rondônia	09°10′35″S 063°40′39″W	
SJTO		Paysandu Farm Aerodrome	São Desidério, Bahia	13°10′31″S 045°41′58″W	
SJTP		Boa Safra Aerodrome	Tapurah, Mato Grosso	12°43′41″S 056°30′10″W	
SJTQ		Armazens Gerais Delazzeri Aerodrome	Campos de Júlio, Mato Grosso	13°41′53″S 059°15′30″W	
SJTR		Timbaúba I Farm Aerodrome	São Desidério, Bahia	12°31′42″S 046°11′14″W	
SJTS		Terra Santa Airport	Terra Santa, Pará	02°04′22″S 056°29′20″W	
SJTT		Grupo Rotta Aerodrome	Sapezal, Mato Grosso	13°38′31″S 058°44′11″W	
SJTU		Tucano Farm Aerodrome	Campo Novo do Parecis, Mato Grosso	13°35′06″S 057°33′52″W	
SJTV		Tivoli Centre Heliport	São Paulo, São Paulo	23°37′43″S 046°44′12″W	
SJTW		Arenhart Aviação Agrícola Aerodrome	Uruguaiana, Rio Grande do Sul	29°53′22″S 057°08′28″W	
SJTX		Nelore Farm Heliport	Bela Vista do Maranhão, Maranhão	03°43′53″S 045°16′24″W	
SJTY		Tivoli Mofarrej Heliport	São Paulo, São Paulo	23°33′51″S 046°39′21″W	
SJTZ		Dom Eliseu Airport	Dom Eliseu, Pará	04°18′10″S 047°34′54″W	
SJUA		ABC Farm Aerodrome	Buritis, Minas Gerais	15°22′26″S 046°19′52″W	
SJUB		Rio Azul Farm Aerodrome	Vila Bela da Santíssima Trindade, Mato Grosso	15°11′00″S 060°13′09″W	
SJUC		Santa Cruz Farm Aerodrome	Padre Bernardo, Goiás	15°22′19″S 048°12′23″W	
SJUD		Uberaba Farm Aerodrome	Comodoro, Mato Grosso	13°04′25″S 060°14′41″W	
SJUE		Ecological Centre Heliport	Barueri, São Paulo	23°32′06″S 046°52′31″W	
SJUF		Silvestre Heliport	Pedra Branca do Amapari, Amapá	00°51′22″N 051°53′24″W	
SJUG		SPEL Embalagens Heliport	Atibaia, São Paulo	23°03′35″S 046°39′11″W	
SJUH		Lagoinha Farm Aerodrome	Pedrinópolis, Minas Gerais	19°14′19″S 047°29′52″W	
SJUI		Uirapuru Farm Aerodrome	Araguanã, Tocantins	06°51′25″S 048°26′24″W	
SJUJ		Juruna Farm Aerodrome	Peixoto de Azevedo, Mato Grosso	10°24′28″S 053°30′51″W	
SJUK		Jequitibá Heliport	Rio de Janeiro, Rio de Janeiro	22°58′06″S 043°17′35″W	
SJUL		Rio Pardo Farm Aerodrome	Iaras, São Paulo	22°52′12″S 049°02′09″W	
SJUM		Maximus Heliport	Ituporanga, Santa Catarina	27°24′52″S 049°36′06″W	
SJUN		São Fernando Golf Club Heliport	Cotia, São Paulo	23°34′20″S 046°52′42″W	
SJUO		São Manoel Farm Aerodrome	Jussara, Goiás	15°17′39″S 051°17′05″W	
SJUP		Posthaus Heliport	Blumenau, Santa Catarina	26°52′50″S 049°08′22″W	
SJUQ		São Clemente Farm Aerodrome	São José dos Campos, São Paulo	23°07′11″S 045°51′06″W	
SJUR		Reunidas Farm Aerodrome	Paranatinga, Mato Grosso	13°28′05″S 054°05′50″W	
SJUS		Acará Farm Aerodrome	Britânia, Goiás	15°04′36″S 051°09′28″W	
SJUT		Rio Branco Cement Heliport	Rio Branco do Sul, Paraná	25°11′44″S 049°19′09″W	
SJUU		Paraná Farm Aerodrome	Nova Roma, Goiás	14°01′41″S 046°52′16″W	Closed
SJUV		Vitória Farm Aerodrome	Nova Ubiratã, Mato Grosso	12°58′42″S 055°07′08″W	
SJUW		CPFL Sede Heliport	Campinas, São Paulo	22°51′28″S 047°02′42″W	
SJUX		Barra do Piraí Metalworking Heliport	Barra do Piraí, Rio de Janeiro	22°28′35″S 043°51′06″W	
SJUY		Sinal Empreendimentos Heliport	Rio das Ostras, Rio de Janeiro	22°29′19″S 041°56′07″W	
SJUZ		Santo Aleixo Heliport	Morungaba, São Paulo	22°55′15″S 046°47′30″W	
SJVA		Varnier Farm Aerodrome	Brasnorte, Mato Grosso do Sul	12°58′09″S 057°24′05″W	
SJVB		Bugio Aerodrome	Pedrinhas Paulista, São Paulo	22°50′55″S 050°43′54″W	
SJVC		Vivicon Heliport	São Paulo, São Paulo	23°30′47″S 046°40′02″W	
SJVD		NRE Paranatinga Heliport	Paranatinga, Mato Grosso	14°13′21″S 053°27′37″W	
SJVE		VR Campos do Jordão Heliport	Campos do Jordão, São Paulo	22°44′36″S 045°32′39″W	
SJVF		Várzea Funda Farm Aerodrome	Cáceres, Mato Grosso	16°35′23″S 057°43′39″W	
SJVG		Gameleira Farm Aerodrome	Vila Bela da Santíssima Trindade, Mato Grosso	14°42′30″S 059°53′15″W	
SJVH		Mansão Macedo Condominium Heliport	Fortaleza, Ceará	03°43′46″S 038°30′04″W	
SJVI		Carmen Farm Aerodrome	Corumbá, Mato Grosso do Sul	18°26′43″S 056°19′46″W	
SJVJ		VCP Jacareí Heliport	Jacareí, São Paulo	23°22′28″S 046°01′21″W	
SJVK		Pian Aerodrome	São Lourenço do Sul, Rio Grande do Sul	31°04′48″S 051°53′44″W	
SJVL		Vale Europeu Aerodrome	Guaramirim, Santa Catarina	26°25′22″S 048°52′35″W	
SJVM		Califórnia Estate Aerodrome	Alta Floresta, Mato Grosso	09°53′31″S 056°07′46″W	
SJVN		Pindorama Farm Aerodrome	Campo Novo do Parecis, Mato Grosso	13°41′09″S 057°48′07″W	
SJVO		Aragarças Airport	Aragarças, Goiás	15°53′58″S 052°14′27″W	
SJVP		Vila Pitinga Aerodrome	Presidente Figueiredo, Amazonas	00°47′57″S 060°05′02″W	
SJVQ		Rio Verde Farm Aerodrome	Loreto, Maranhão	07°29′45″S 045°30′03″W	
SJVR		São Joaquim Farm Aerodrome	Jardim, Mato Grosso do Sul	21°29′15″S 056°29′11″W	
SJVS		Boa Vista Farm Aerodrome	Santa Fé, Paraná	23°04′45″S 051°46′45″W	
SJVT		Alto do Rio Verde Trancoso Heliport	Porto Seguro, Bahia	16°36′00″S 039°05′49″W	
SJVV		Viviane Farm Aerodrome	Dueré, Tocantins	11°24′43″S 049°23′09″W	
SJVW		Santa Isabel Farm Aerodrome	Luís Eduardo Magalhães, Bahia	11°57′17″S 045°43′23″W	
SJVX		Pagrisa Aerodrome	Ulianópolis, Pará	03°42′10″S 047°45′40″W	
SJVY		Vitória Farm Aerodrome	Itarumã, Goiás	18°45′18″S 051°28′38″W	
SJVZ		Capão da Cruz Farm Dam Aerodrome	Guatapará, São Paulo	21°25′50″S 047°54′06″W	
SJWA		Aerovaço Aerodrome	Bom Jesus do Galho, Minas Gerais	19°35′17″S 042°27′31″W	
SJWB		Bartira Farm Aerodrome	Rancharia, São Paulo	22°09′53″S 050°57′54″W	
SJWC		Cometa Vila Maria Heliport	São Paulo, São Paulo	23°31′02″S 046°34′45″W	
SJWD		RDP Heliport	Mangaratiba, Rio de Janeiro	22°59′37″S 044°05′38″W	
SJWE		Santa Delfina Farm Aerodrome	Miranda, Mato Grosso do Sul	20°01′36″S 056°19′20″W	
SJWF		Mima Heliport	São João da Barra, Rio de Janeiro	21°38′51″S 041°01′27″W	
SJWG		Itagro Aerodrome	Alegrete, Rio Grande do Sul	29°46′48″S 055°41′48″W	
SJWH		North Regional Hospital Heliport	Sobral, Ceará	03°40′36″S 040°22′10″W	
SJWI		Flor Farm Aerodrome	Campo Grande, Mato Grosso do Sul	21°30′03″S 053°45′19″W	
SJWJ		HPE Heliport	São Paulo, São Paulo	23°40′12″S 046°42′11″W	
SJWK		FIEC Heliport	Fortaleza, Ceará	03°44′27″S 038°30′33″W	
SJWL		Doutor Mauro de Souza Castro Aerodrome	Campo Largo, Paraná	25°25′02″S 049°30′55″W	
SJWM		Pátio das Américas Heliport	São José dos Campos, São Paulo	23°12′50″S 045°54′32″W	
SJWN		Unimed Northeast Heliport	Caxias do Sul, Rio Grande do Sul	29°09′53″S 051°12′03″W	
SJWO		Joule Agropecuária Aerodrome	Cocalinho, Mato Grosso	13°40′28″S 051°06′56″W	
SJWP		Warpol Aerodrome	São Desidério, Bahia	12°37′15″S 045°55′38″W	
SJWQ		Aeroclube de Birigui–Comandante Munir Djabak Aerodrome	Birigui, São Paulo	21°13′00″S 050°18′21″W	
SJWR		Heligalo Heliport	Angra dos Reis, Rio de Janeiro	23°02′03″S 044°12′07″W	
SJWS		Praia de Olaria Heliport	São Sebastião, São Paulo	23°46′00″S 045°24′19″W	
SJWT		Tucumã Farm Aerodrome	Correntina, Bahia	13°37′57″S 045°47′57″W	
SJWU		Dimensão Indústria Heliport	São Luis, Maranhão	02°39′31″S 044°18′04″W	
SJWV		São Judas Farm Aerodrome	São Miguel do Araguaia, Goiás	13°22′41″S 050°25′28″W	
SJWW		Cachoeira Preta Farm Aerodrome	Água Clara, Mato Grosso do Sul	20°01′17″S 053°12′58″W	
SJWX		Rio Alegre Aerodrome	Euclides da Cunha Paulista, São Paulo	22°34′22″S 052°30′56″W	
SJWY		Parqway Heliport	Brasília, Federal District	15°54′42″S 047°58′18″W	
SJWZ		E-Tower Heliport	São Paulo, São Paulo	23°35′38″S 046°41′25″W	
SJXA		Itaúna Aviation Club Aerodrome	Itaúna, Minas Gerais	20°04′28″S 044°39′15″W	
SJXB		Regina Ranch Farm Aerodrome	Bonito, Mato Grosso do Sul	21°05′48″S 056°33′53″W	
SJXC		Usina Santa Cruz Aerodrome	Santa Cruz Cabrália, Bahia	16°10′59″S 039°21′29″W	
SJXD		Escarpas Heliport	Capitólio, Minas Gerais	20°38′24″S 046°00′18″W	
SJXE		Deputy Moraes Souza Aerodrome	Buriti dos Lopes, Piauí	03°09′16″S 041°52′05″W	
SJXF		Coqueiros Farm Heliport	Florestal, Minas Gerais	19°50′37″S 044°25′02″W	
SJXG		Agrovás Farm Aerodrome	São Félix do Araguaia, Mato Grosso	11°30′46″S 052°24′41″W	
SJXH		Grupo Petrópolis Itapissuma Heliport	Itapissuma, Pernambuco	07°47′29″S 034°55′30″W	
SJXI		Santa Rita do Sapucaí Airport	Santa Rita do Sapucaí, Minas Gerais	22°16′22″S 045°38′24″W	
SJXJ		Alimentos Dallas Aerodrome	Nova Alvorada do Sul, Mato Grosso do Sul	21°27′15″S 054°23′27″W	
SJXK		Eldorado Heliport	São Paulo, São Paulo	23°34′23″S 046°41′51″W	
SJXL		Clínicas de Teresina Hospital Heliport	Teresina, Piauí	05°03′28″S 042°48′57″W	
SJXM		Carolina de Assis Repetto Aerodrome	Lima Duarte, Minas Gerais	21°43′49″S 043°53′32″W	
SJXN		Niquini Heliport	Betim, Minas Gerais	19°57′42″S 044°04′18″W	Closed
SJXO		Grupo DH Aerodrome	Jaborandi, Bahia	14°17′44″S 045°33′13″W	
SJXP		Alice Maria Sampaio Ferreira Heliport	São Paulo, São Paulo	23°36′40″S 046°41′40″W	
SJXQ		Cargo Park Heliport	Rio de Janeiro, Rio de Janeiro	22°48′55″S 043°17′01″W	
SJXR		B. Cao Viño Heliport	Praia Grande, São Paulo	24°00′36″S 046°25′03″W	
SJXS		Veracel Airport	Belmonte, Bahia	16°06′18″S 039°21′55″W	
SJXT		Iguassú Heliport	Angra dos Reis, Rio de Janeiro	23°07′16″S 044°11′34″W	
SJXU		Coperbrás Farm Aerodrome	Brasília, Federal District	15°45′03″S 047°32′34″W	
SJXV		Bela Vista Farm Aerodrome	Amambai, Mato Grosso do Sul	22°55′52″S 055°03′16″W	
SJXW		Pacu Farm Aerodrome	Inhaúma, Minas Gerais	19°26′23″S 044°28′29″W	
SJXX		Recreio Aerodrome	Ponta Porã, Mato Grosso do Sul	22°40′34″S 055°32′37″W	
SJXY		Pirata's Mall Heliport	Angra dos Reis, Rio de Janeiro	23°00′14″S 044°18′07″W	
SJXZ		Antônio Covre Aerodrome	Itabela, Bahia	16°44′03″S 039°25′47″W	
SJYA		BCW Heliport	Penha, Santa Catarina	26°47′58″S 048°36′46″W	
SJYB		Thabor Heliport	Caieiras, São Paulo	23°24′39″S 046°40′12″W	
SJYC		Yvy-Pita Farm Aerodrome	Juti, Mato Grosso do Sul	22°53′31″S 054°39′53″W	
SJYD		Kajussol Farm Aerodrome	Santa Luzia d'Oeste, Rondônia	11°57′32″S 061°41′08″W	
SJYE		Água Fria Aerodrome	Uiramutã, Roraima	04°37′14″N 060°16′38″W	
SJYF		Ajarani Aerodrome	Caracaraí, Roraima	02°00′28″N 061°28′33″W	
SJYG		Alto Mucajaí Aerodrome	Alto Alegre, Roraima	02°45′54″N 062°13′17″W	
SJYH		Cachoeira Alta Farm Aerodrome	Santana do Araguaia, Pará	08°46′50″S 050°58′08″W	
SJYI		Arai Aerodrome	Pacaraima, Roraima	04°26′38″N 060°50′50″W	
SJYJ		Aratha-ú Aerodrome	Alto Alegre, Roraima	03°09′39″N 063°46′53″W	
SJYK		Baixo Catrimani Aerodrome	Caracaraí, Roraima	01°04′16″N 062°13′06″W	
SJYL		Baixo Mucajaí Aerodrome	Alto Alegre, Roraima	02°44′13″N 062°01′10″W	
SJYM		Bala Aerodrome	Pacaraima, Roraima	03°50′14″N 060°36′12″W	
SJYN		Centro Empresarial Araguaia II Heliport	Barueri, São Paulo	23°30′10″S 046°50′31″W	
SJYO		Bananal Aerodrome	Uiramutã, Roraima	04°37′58″N 060°35′08″W	
SJYP		Bananeira Aerodrome	Uiramutã, Roraima	04°19′16″N 060°11′38″W	
SJYQ		Barreirinha Aerodrome	Uiramutã, Roraima	04°19′51″N 060°17′08″W	
SJYR		Cajú Aerodrome	Uiramutã, Roraima	04°42′21″N 060°30′55″W	
SJYS		Camará Aerodrome	Normandia, Roraima	03°59′27″N 060°10′54″W	
SJYT		Campo Formoso Aerodrome	Pacaraima, Roraima	04°43′12″N 060°46′11″W	
SJYU		Campo Grande Aerodrome	Pacaraima, Roraima	04°41′08″N 060°48′01″W	
SJYV		Cauê-Apiaí Heliport	Apiaí, São Paulo	24°31′02″S 048°51′01″W	
SJYW		Santa Terezinha Farm Aerodrome	Santa Terezinha, Mato Grosso	10°19′09″S 050°56′58″W	
SJYX		Foz do Chopim Heliport	Cruzeiro do Iguaçu, Paraná	25°34′19″S 053°07′23″W	
SJYY		Jequitibá Farm Heliport	Porto Feliz, São Paulo	23°15′13″S 047°36′22″W	
SJYZ		Gaúcha Farm Aerodrome	Campo Novo do Parecis, Mato Grosso	13°43′23″S 057°37′14″W	
SJZA	CJZ	Cajazeiras Airport	Cajazeiras, Paraíba	06°52′58″S 038°36′57″W	
SJZB		Vale do Tucanã Aerodrome	Castanheira, Mato Grosso	10°40′59″S 058°38′42″W	
SJZC		São Luiz Distillery Aerodrome	Maraial, Pernambuco	08°46′44″S 035°47′06″W	
SJZD		Bandeiras Farm Aerodrome	Corumbá, Mato Grosso do Sul	17°51′36″S 056°42′23″W	
SJZE		Tapiraguaia Farm Aerodrome	Santa Terezinha, Mato Grosso	10°32′31″S 050°33′53″W	
SJZF		Campo Triste Farm Aerodrome	Três Lagoas, Mato Grosso do Sul	20°37′30″S 052°02′20″W	
SJZG		São Geraldo Farm Aerodrome	Caseara, Tocantins	09°34′21″S 049°42′57″W	
SJZH		Rio do Fogo Farm Aerodrome	Nova Santa Helena, Mato Grosso	10°53′14″S 055°00′03″W	
SJZI		Monte Carmelo Heliport	Santos, São Paulo	23°57′30″S 046°19′51″W	
SJZJ		Villa Dória Heliport	Campos do Jordão, São Paulo	22°41′53″S 045°31′47″W	
SJZK		Projac Heliport	Rio de Janeiro, Rio de Janeiro	22°57′37″S 043°24′21″W	
SJZL		Vaca Mocha Farm Aerodrome	Caracol, Mato Grosso do Sul	22°13′17″S 057°09′30″W	
SJZM		Santa Clara Farm Aerodrome	Rio Verde de Mato Grosso, Mato Grosso do Sul	18°56′18″S 055°12′06″W	
SJZN		Cima Farm Aerodrome	Sapezal, Mato Grosso	12°59′26″S 058°36′33″W	
SJZO		Zi Viol Aerodrome	Campo Grande, Mato Grosso do Sul	20°58′18″S 054°04′14″W	
SJZP		Mathovi Aerodrome	Novo Mundo, Mato Grosso	09°50′18″S 055°27′57″W	
SJZQ		Bom Retiro Farm Aerodrome	Itaqui, Rio Grande do Sul	29°18′29″S 056°11′34″W	
SJZR		Rodeio Farm Aerodrome	São Miguel do Guaporé, Rondônia	12°07′44″S 063°00′32″W	
SJZS		Canel Farm Aerodrome	Uruçuí, Piauí	07°32′04″S 044°49′14″W	
SJZT		Busato II Aerodrome	Serra do Ramalho, Bahia	13°14′19″S 043°44′10″W	
SJZU		Seculum Heliport	São Paulo, São Paulo	23°35′02″S 046°41′02″W	
SJZV		Terras de São José Heliport	Itu, São Paulo	23°17′56″S 047°17′44″W	
SJZW		Regina Farm Aerodrome	Itatinga, São Paulo	23°17′12″S 048°44′17″W	
SJZX		Abreu Rocha Heliport	Praia Grande, São Paulo	24°00′25″S 046°24′53″W	
SJZY		Rio Negro Administrative Centre Heliport	Barueri, São Paulo	23°30′02″S 046°50′55″W	
SJZZ		Agropecuária Zé Reis Aerodrome	Palmeirópolis, Tocantins	13°01′08″S 048°24′57″W	
