= Jaborandi =

Jaborandi may refer to:

- Jaborandi, São Paulo, a municipality in Brazil
- Jaborandi, Bahia, a municipality in Brazil
- Jaborandi, common name for several plant species in genus Pilocarpus
