= São Desidério =

Coordinates: 12°22′S 44°58′W

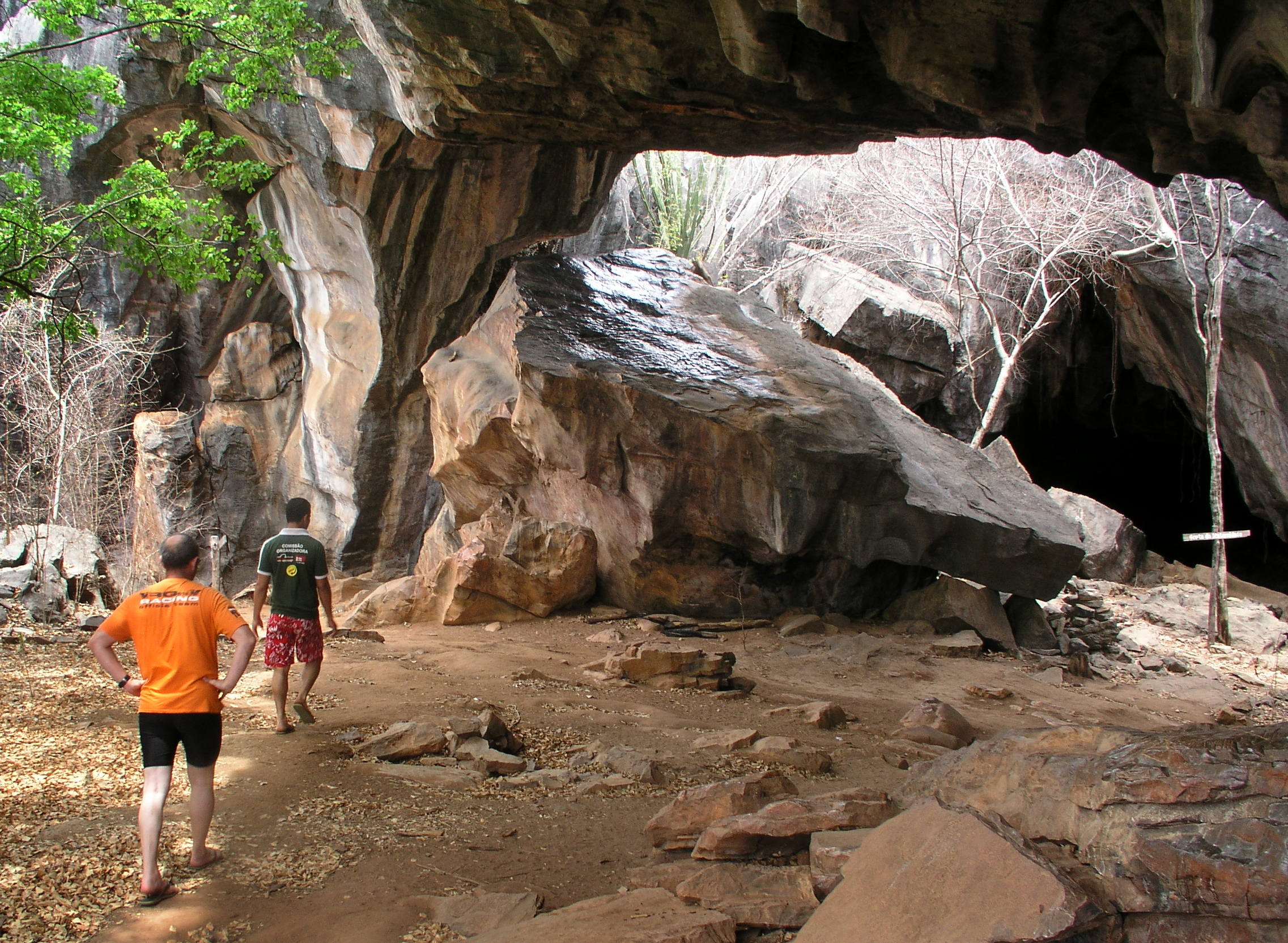
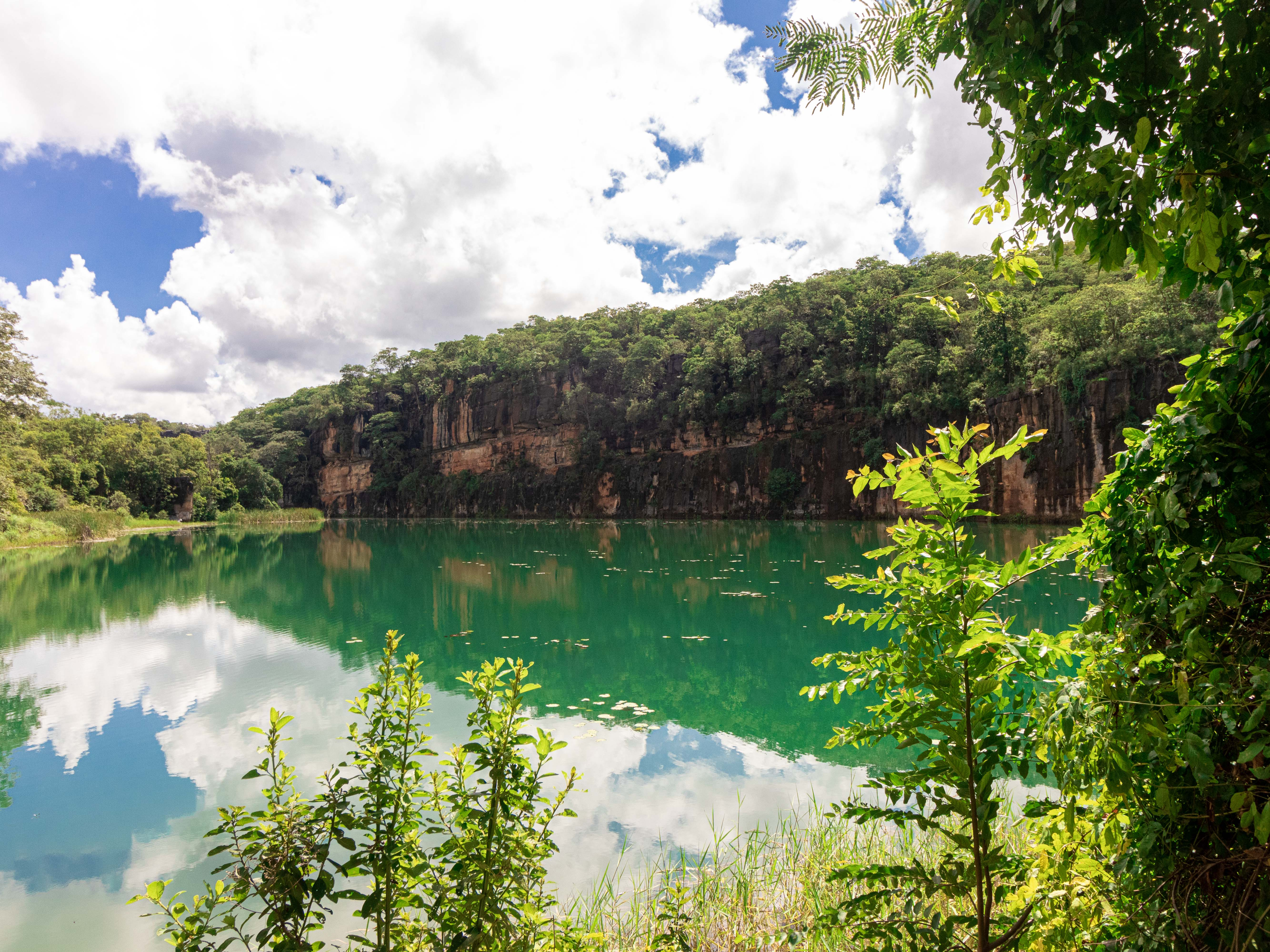
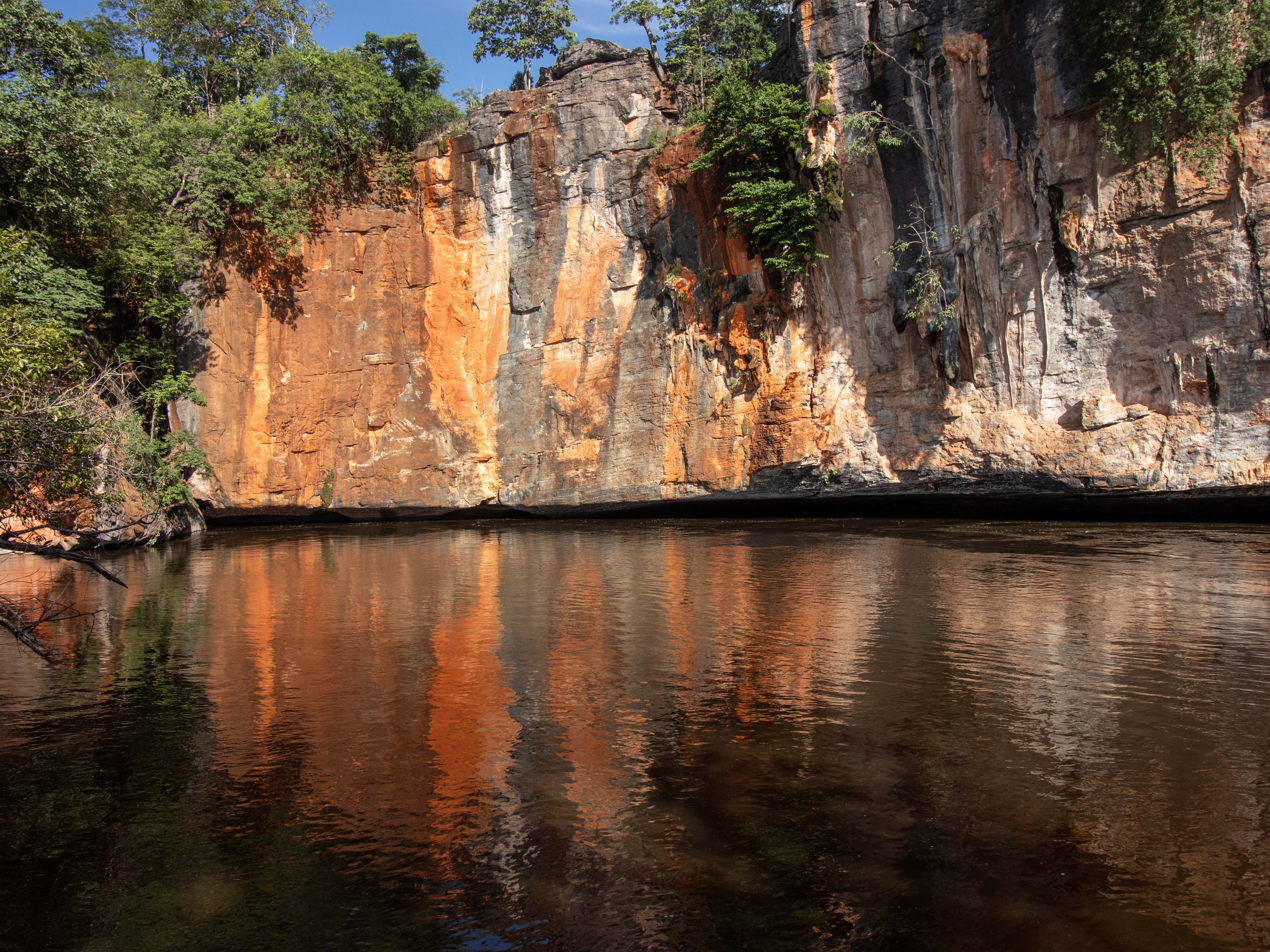
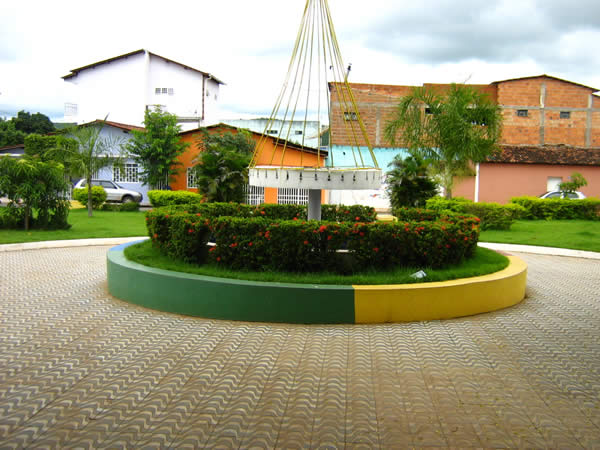
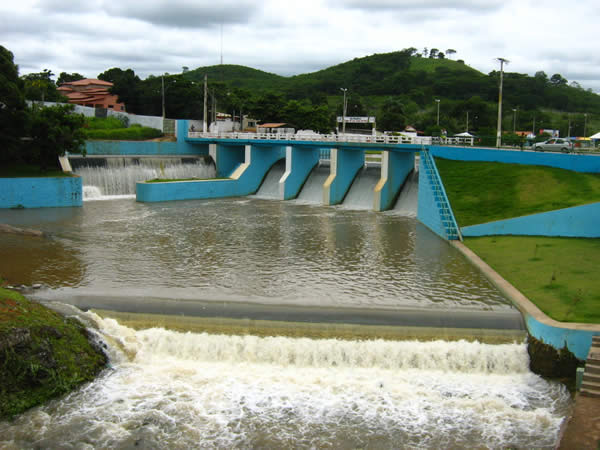
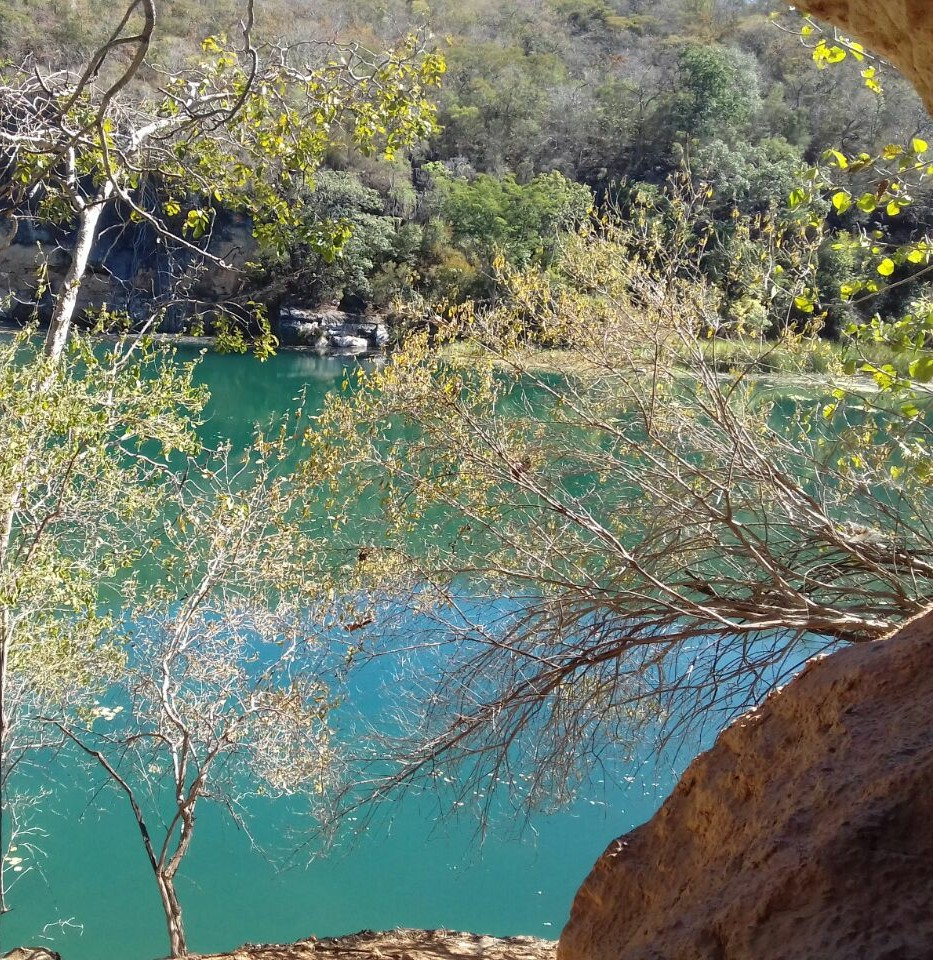
- Municipality

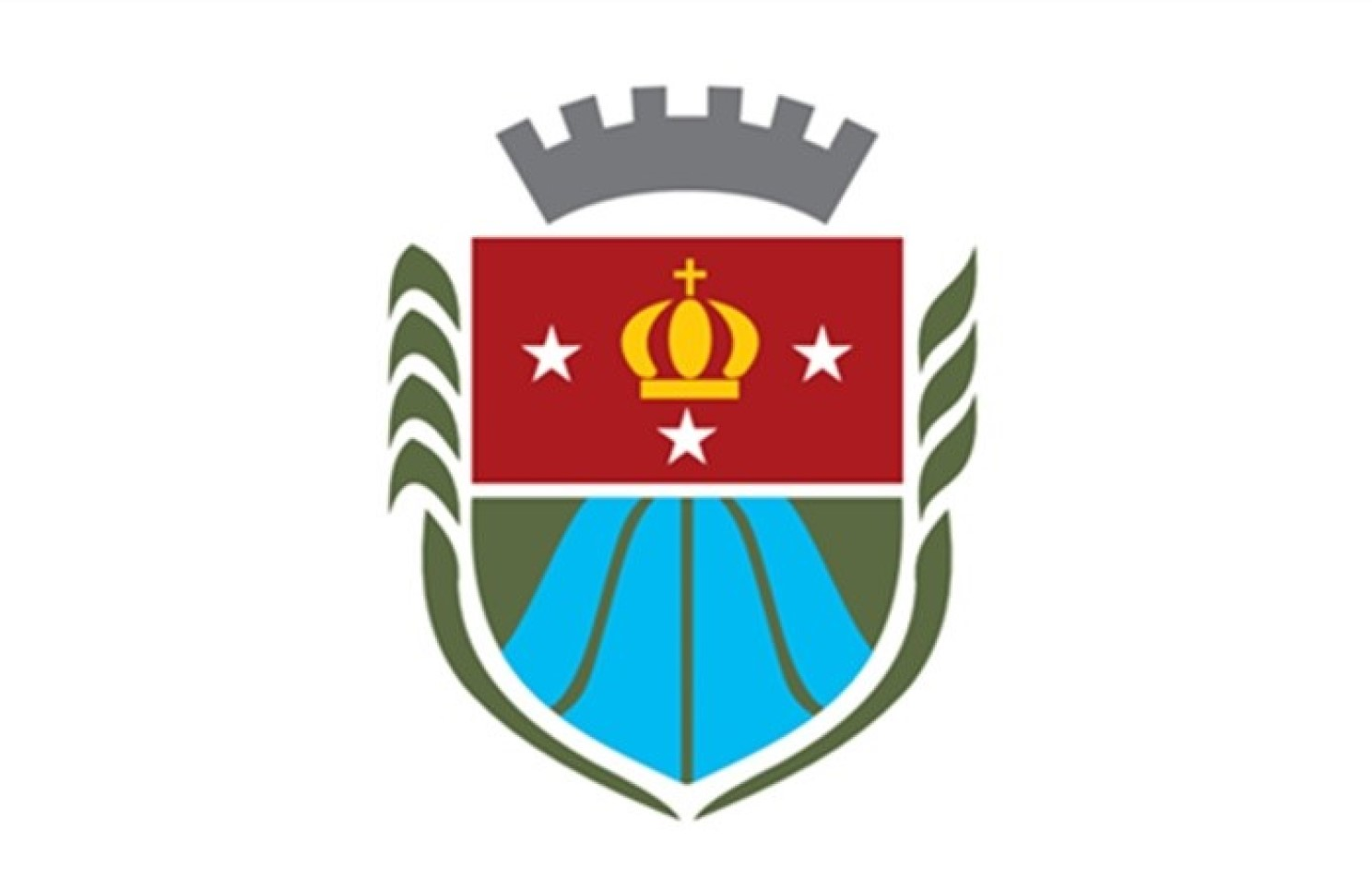
- Flag
- Interactive map of São Desidério
- Country: Brazil
- Region: Nordeste
- State: Bahia

Population (2020)
  - Total: 34,266
- Time zone: UTC−3 (BRT)

São Desidério is a municipality in the state of Bahia in the North-East region of Brazil.

== Tourism ==
The municipality has attractive places in nature, a good option for tourism. For example, there is Sítio do Rio Grande (located in the village of the same name), with river of crystal clear waters (the Rio Grande River being one of the main tributaries of the São Francisco River), stone wall, rapelling and much more natural beauty.

== See also ==
- List of municipalities in Bahia
