= Reginópolis =

- Municipality
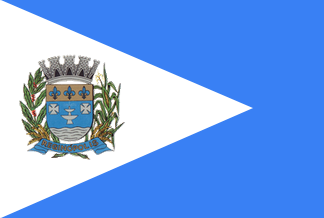
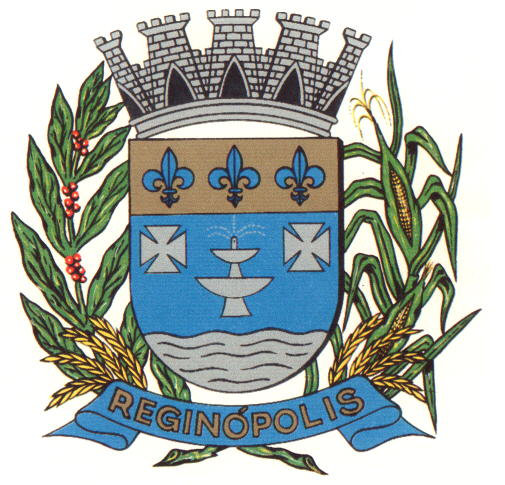
- Flag Coat of arms

- Location in São Paulo state

- Location in Brazil
- Coordinates: 21°53′17″S 49°13′31″W
- Country: Brazil
- Region: Southeast
- State: São Paulo

Area
  - Total: 410.8 km^{2} (158.6 sq mi)

Population (2020)
  - Total: 9,837
  - Density: 23.95/km^{2} (62.02/sq mi)
- Time zone: UTC−3 (BRT)

Reginópolis is a municipality in the state of São Paulo in Brazil. The population is 9,837 (2020 est.) in an area of 410.8 km^{2} (159 sq mi). The elevation is 391 m (1,283 ft).

== History ==
The municipality was created by state law in 1948.

Map of the state of São Paulo (1948).

== Media ==
In telecommunications, the city was served by Companhia de Telecomunicações do Estado de São Paulo until 1973, when it began to be served by Telecomunicações de São Paulo. In July 1998, this company was acquired by Telefónica, which adopted the Vivo brand in 2012.

The company is currently an operator of cell phones, fixed lines, internet (fiber optics/4G) and television (satellite and cable).

== See also ==
- List of municipalities in São Paulo
