= Campos de Júlio =

Coordinates: 13.8989°S 59.1478°W

- Municipality
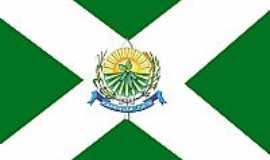
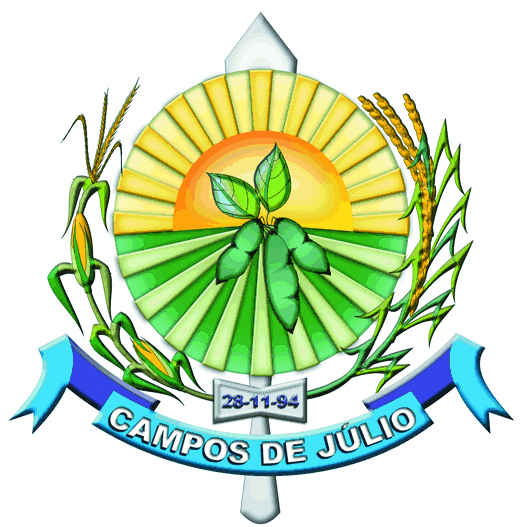
- Flag Coat of arms

- Country: Brazil
- Region: Center-West
- State: Mato Grosso
- Mesoregion: Norte Mato-Grossense

Population (2020)
  - Total: 7,070
- Time zone: UTC−3 (BRT)

Campos de Júlio is a municipality in the state of Mato Grosso in the Central-West Region of Brazil.

== See also ==
- List of municipalities in Mato Grosso
