= Caseara =

Municipality in Tocantins, Brazil

- Municipality
- Location in Tocantins state

- Location in Brazil
- Coordinates: 9°16′40″S 49°57′21″W
- Country: Brazil
- Region: North
- State: Tocantins

Area
  - Total: 1,692 km^{2} (653 sq mi)

Population (2020)
  - Total: 5,442
  - Density: 3.216/km^{2} (8.330/sq mi)
- Time zone: UTC−3 (BRT)

Caseara is a municipality located in the Brazilian state of Tocantins. Its population was 5,442 (2020) and its area is 1,692 km^{2}.

The municipality contains 10.66% of the 1,678,000-hectare (4,150,000-acre) Ilha do Bananal / Cantão Environmental Protection Area, created in 1997. The headquarters and visitor center of Cantão State Park are located just outside the town of Caseara. The municipality plans to open a hiking/bicycle trail from the town center to the park's visitor center in 2014.

== See also ==
- List of municipalities in Tocantins
