= Pedra Lavrada =

Coordinates: 6°45′S 36°28′W

- Municipality
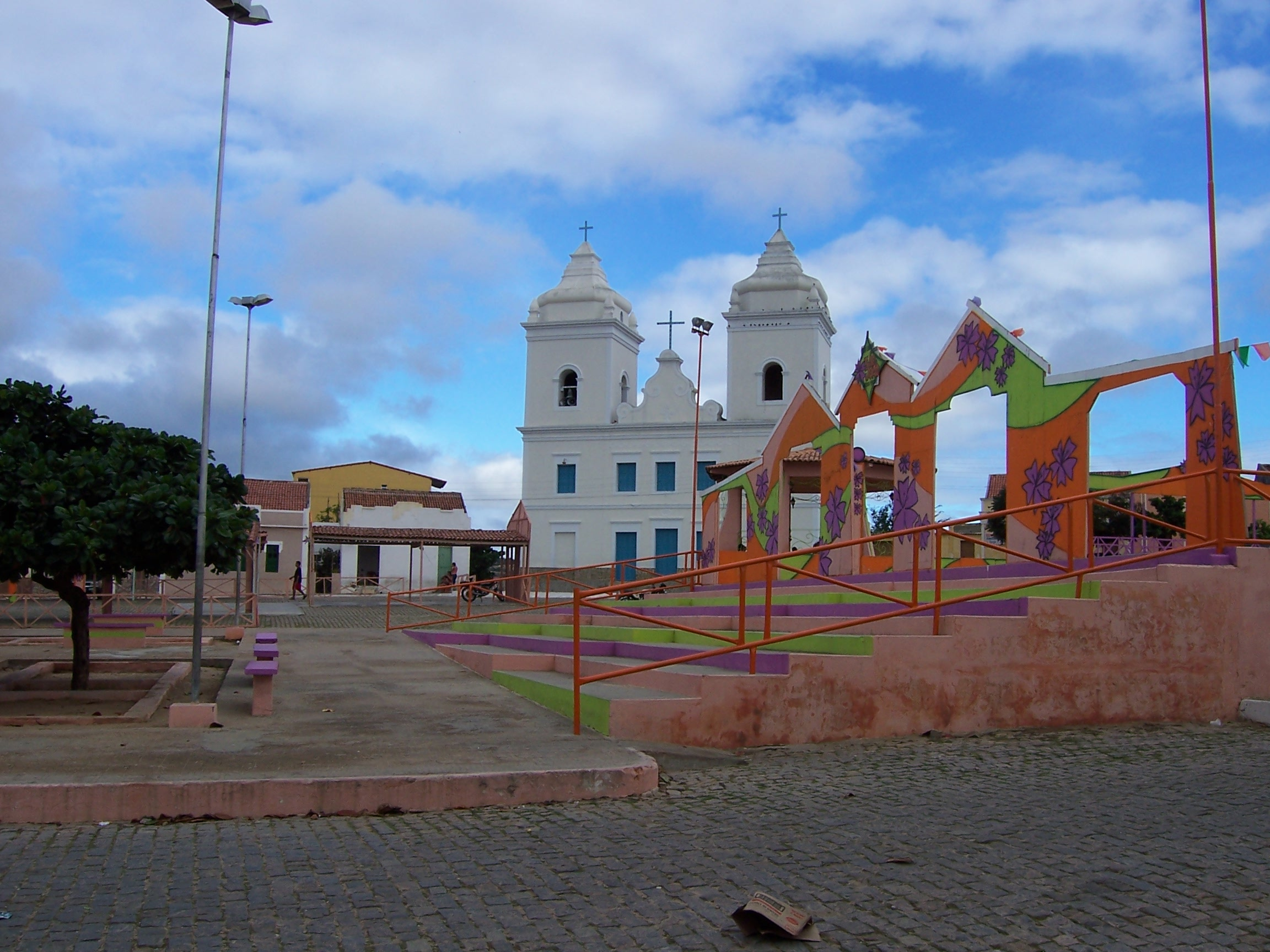

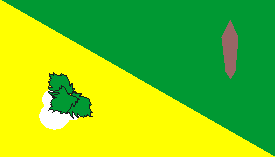
- Flag Coat of arms
- Interactive map of Pedra Lavrada
- Country: Brazil
- Region: South
- State: Paraíba
- Mesoregion: Boborema

Population (2020)
  - Total: 7,899
- Time zone: UTC−3 (BRT)

Pedra Lavrada is a municipality in the state of Paraíba in the Northeast Region of Brazil.

== See also ==
- List of municipalities in Paraíba
