= Santa Bárbara do Sul =

Municipality in Rio Grande do Sul, Brazil

Coordinates: 28°22′S 53°15′W

- Municipality
- Interactive map of Santa Bárbara do Sul
- Country: Brazil
- Time zone: UTC−3 (BRT)

Santa Bárbara do Sul is a municipality in the state of Rio Grande do Sul, Brazil. As of 2020, the estimated population was 7,909.

== See also ==
- List of municipalities in Rio Grande do Sul
