= Lambari d'Oeste =

Coordinates: 15.3228°S 58.0039°W

- Municipality
- Country: Brazil
- Region: Center-West
- State: Mato Grosso
- Mesoregion: Sudoeste Mato-Grossense

Population (2020)
  - Total: 6,186
- Time zone: UTC−3 (BRT)

Lambari d'Oeste is a municipality in the state of Mato Grosso in the Central-West Region of Brazil.

== Climate ==
Lambari d'Oeste is classified as tropical savanna climate (Köppen climate classification: Aw).

== See also ==
- List of municipalities in Mato Grosso
