= Itaju do Colônia =

Municipality of Bahia, Brazil

Coordinates: 15°08′34″S 39°43′26″W

- Municipality
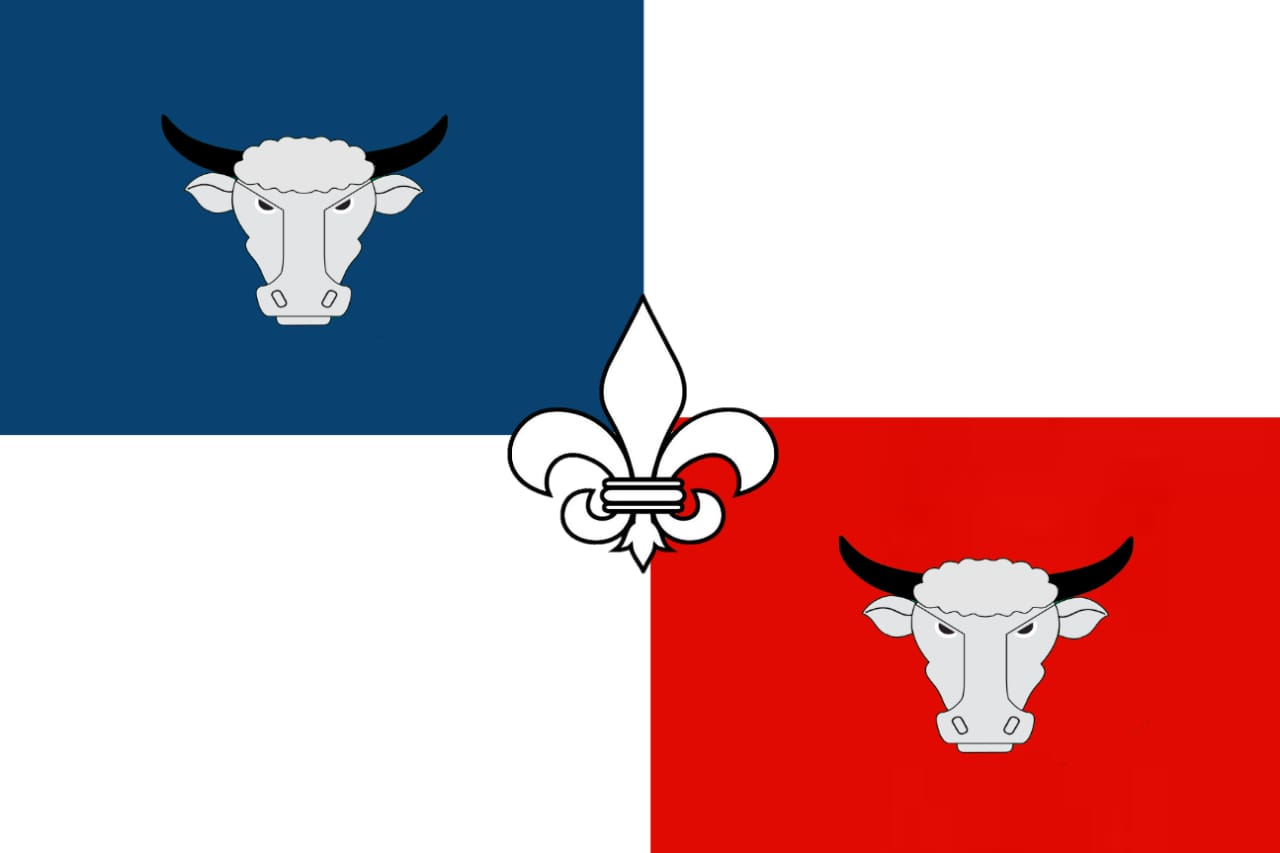
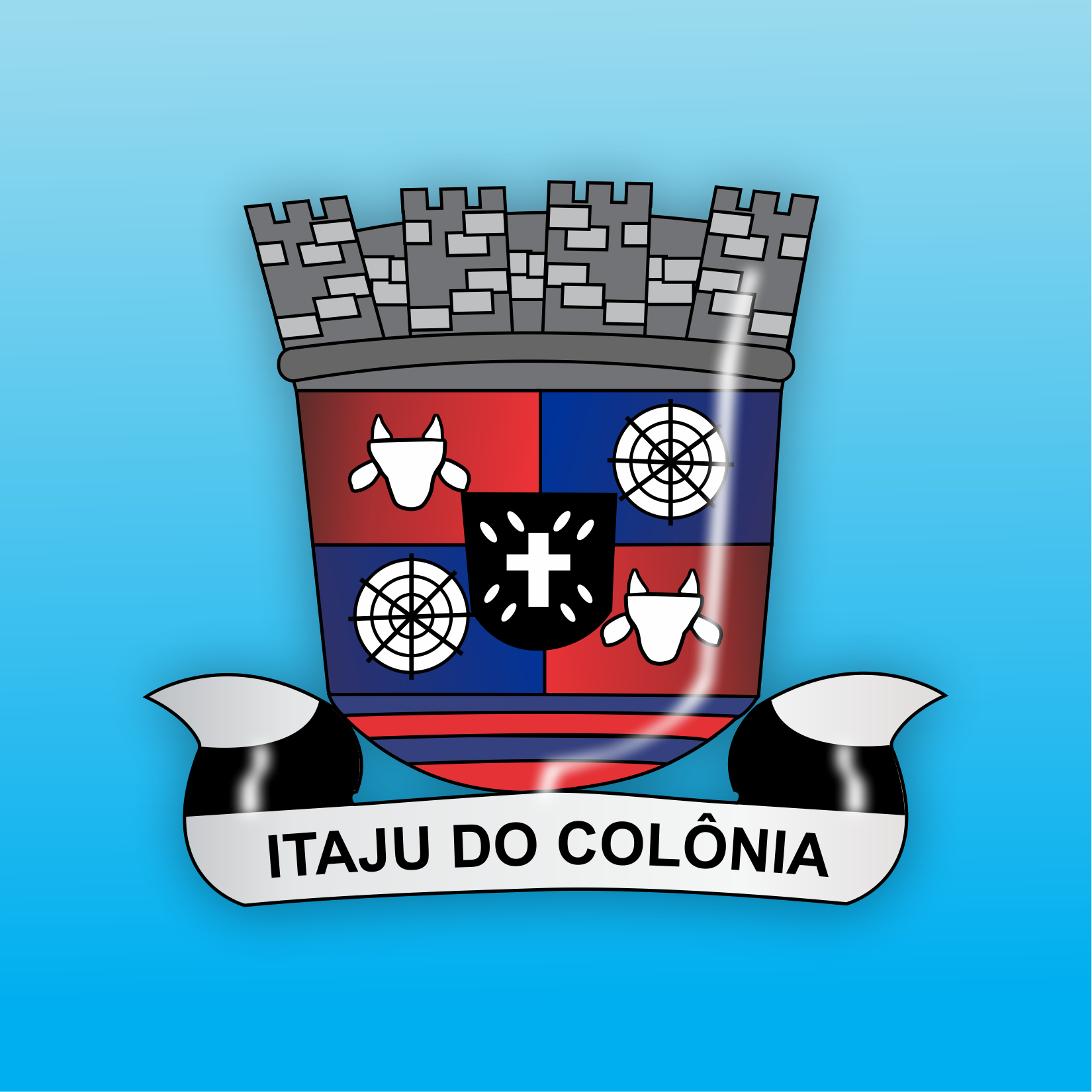
- Flag Coat of arms
- Interactive map of Itaju do Colônia
- Country: Brazil
- Region: Nordeste
- State: Bahia

Population (2020)
  - Total: 6,596
- Time zone: UTC−3 (BRT)

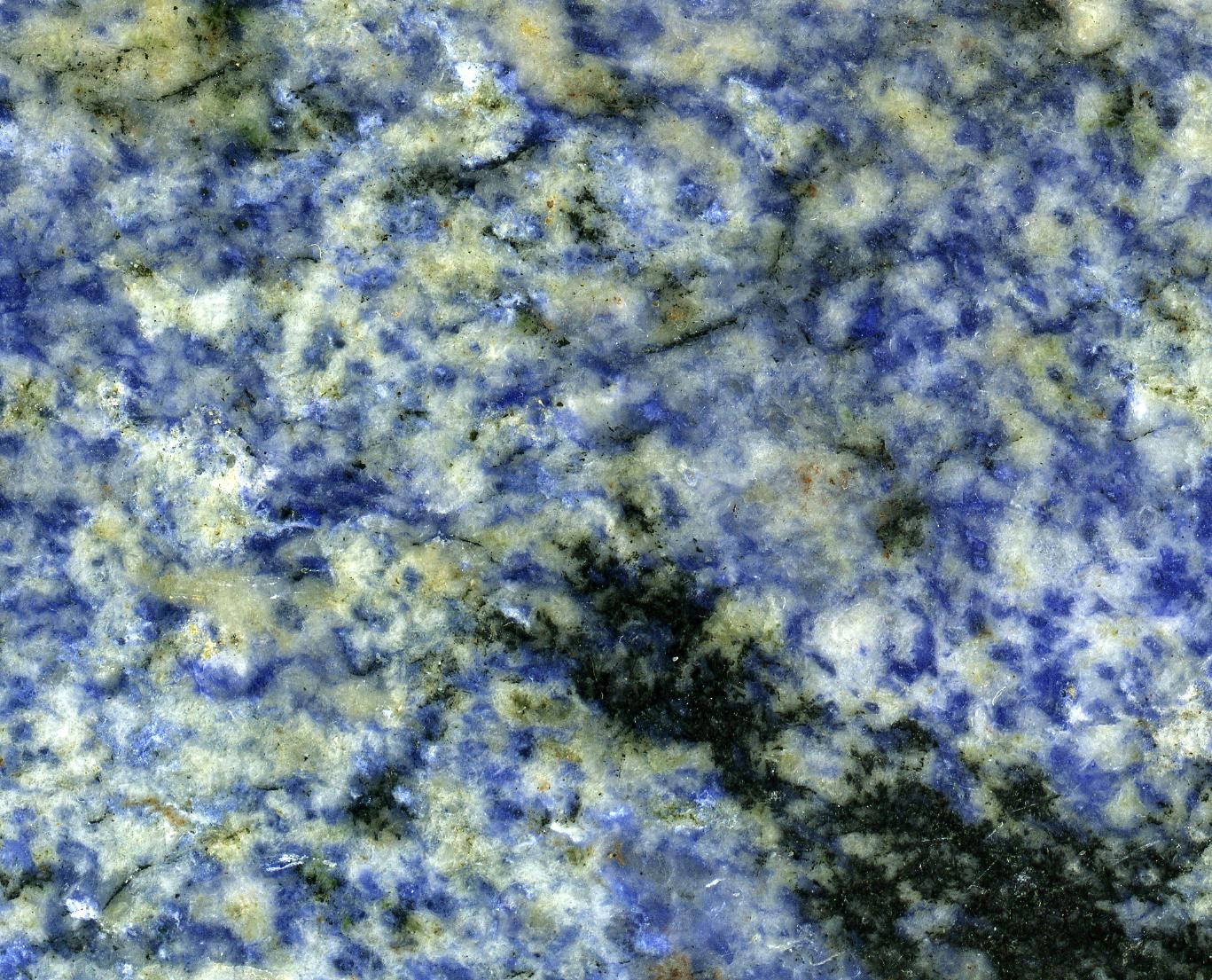
Sodalite metasyenite, sold as "Azul Bahia Granite," quarried at Fazenda Hiassu near Itaju

Itaju do Colônia is a municipality in the state of Bahia in the North-East region of Brazil.

== See also ==
- List of municipalities in Bahia
