= Iramaia =

Municipality of Bahia, Brazil

Coordinates: 13°17′09″S 40°57′03″W

- Municipality
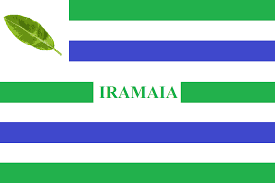
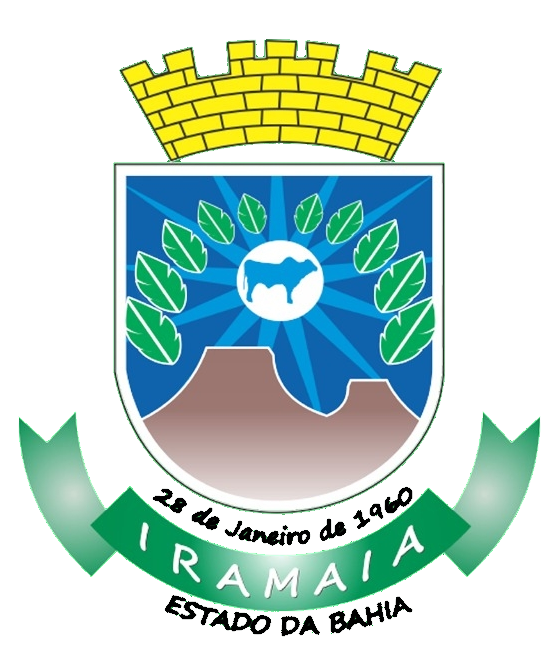
- Flag Coat of arms
- Interactive map of Iramaia
- Country: Brazil
- Region: Nordeste
- State: Bahia

Population (2020)
  - Total: 8,197
- Time zone: UTC−3 (BRT)

Iramaia is a municipality in the state of Bahia in the North-East region of Brazil.

== See also ==
- List of municipalities in Bahia
