= Santa Luzia d'Oeste =

Municipality in Rondônia, Brazil

- Municipality
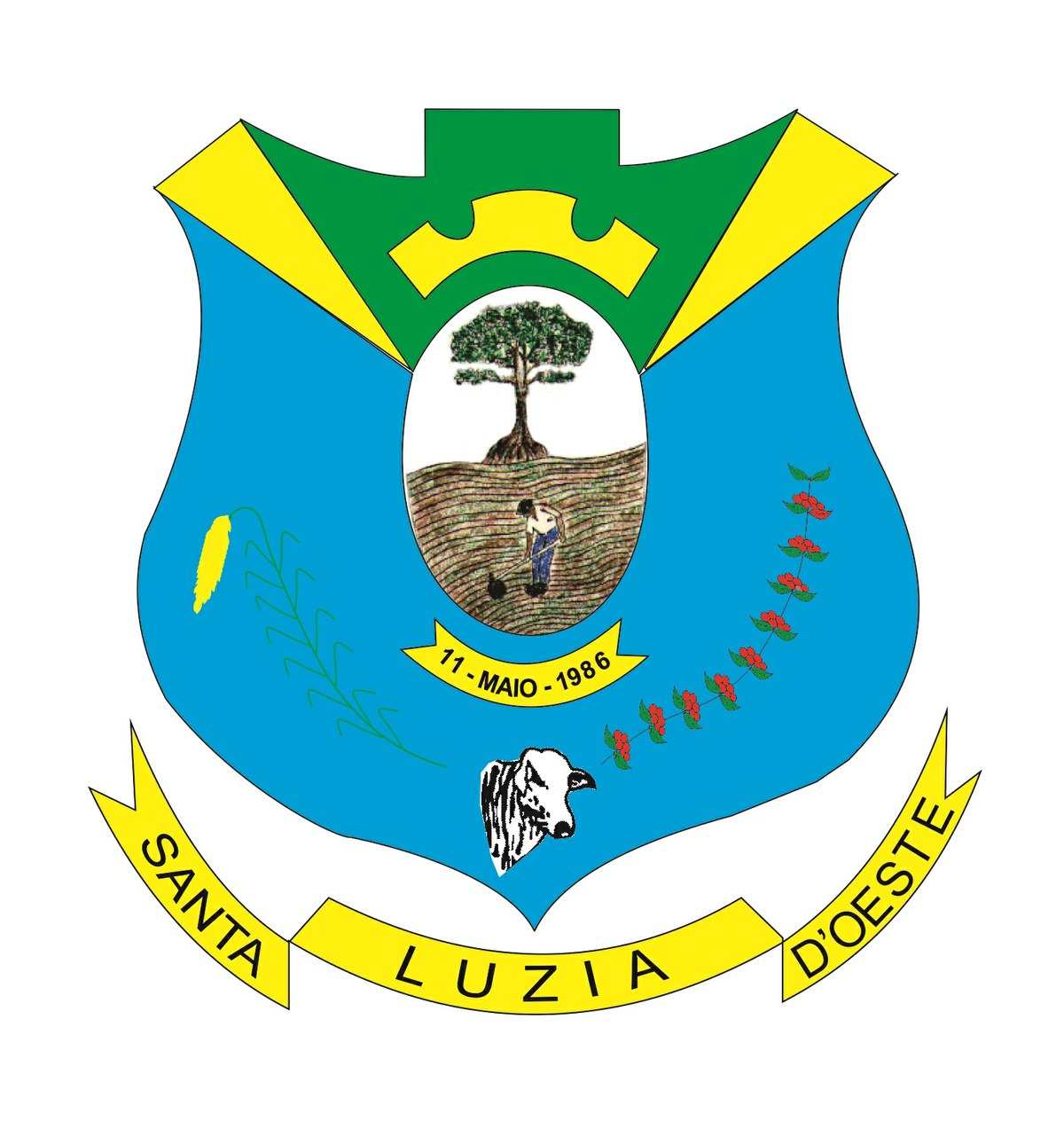
- Flag Coat of arms

- Location in Rondônia state

- Location in Brazil
- Coordinates: 11°54′29″S 61°46′44″W
- Country: Brazil
- Region: North
- State: Rondônia

Area
  - Total: 1,198 km^{2} (463 sq mi)

Population (2020)
  - Total: 6,216
  - Density: 5.189/km^{2} (13.44/sq mi)
- Time zone: UTC−4 (AMT)

Santa Luzia d'Oeste is a municipality located in the Brazilian state of Rondônia. Its population is 6,216 (2020) and its area is 1,198 km^{2}.

== See also ==
- List of municipalities in Rondônia
