= Balneário Piçarras =

Coordinates: 26.75°S 48.6667°W

- Municipality
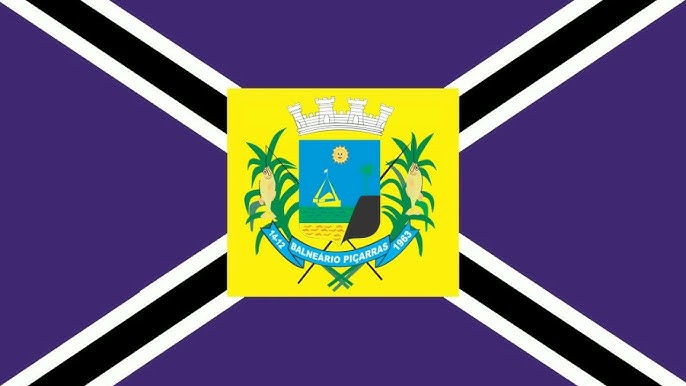
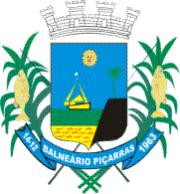
- Flag Coat of arms

- Country: Brazil
- Region: South
- State: Santa Catarina
- Mesoregion: Vale do Itajai

Population (2020)
  - Total: 23,772
- Time zone: UTC−3 (BRT)

Balneário Piçarras is a municipality in the state of Santa Catarina in the South region of Brazil.

== See also ==
- List of municipalities in Santa Catarina
