= Assaré =

Municipality in Ceará, Brazil

Coordinates: 6°52′S 39°52′W

- Municipality
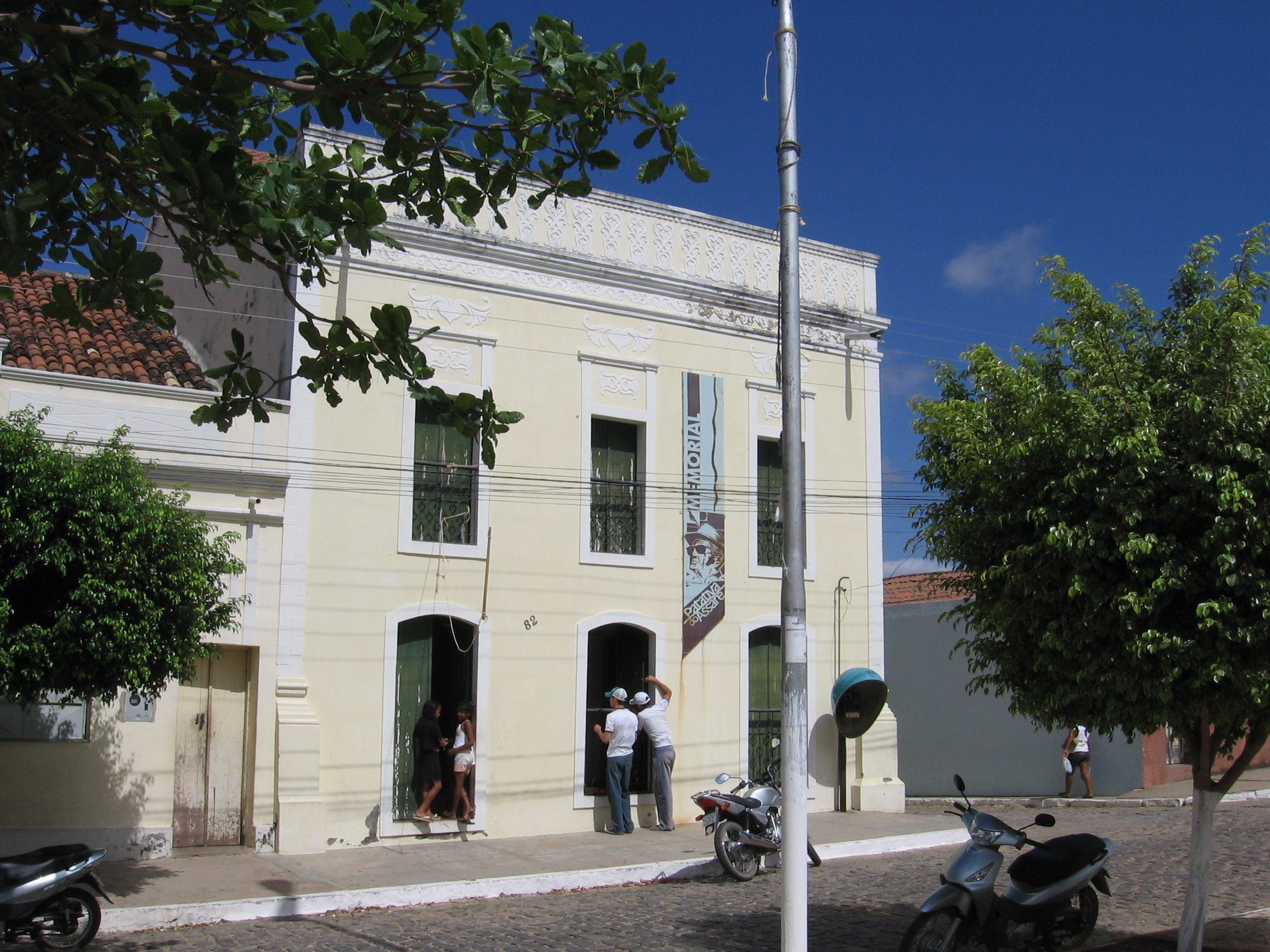

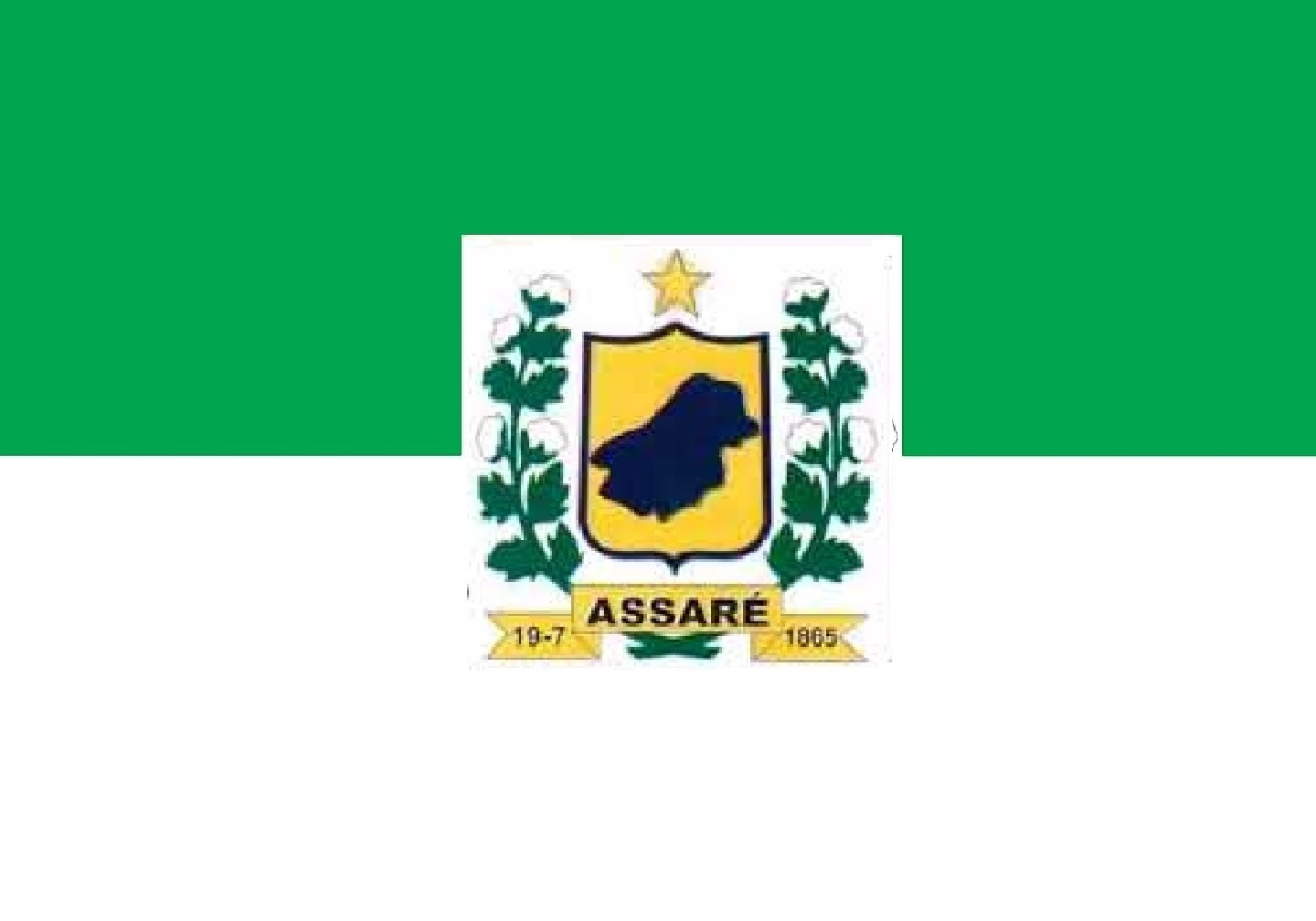
- Flag
- Interactive map of Assaré
- Country: Brazil
- Region: Nordeste
- State: Ceará
- Mesoregion: Sul Cearense

Population (2020)
  - Total: 23,478
- Time zone: UTC−3 (BRT)

Assaré is a municipality in the state of Ceará in the Northeast region of Brazil.

== See also ==
- List of municipalities in Ceará
