= Jaborandi, São Paulo =

Jaborandi
- Municipality
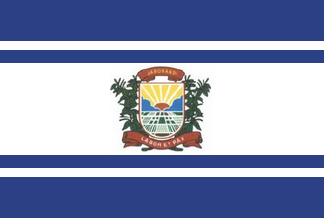
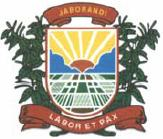
- Flag Coat of arms

- Location in São Paulo state

- Location in Brazil
- Coordinates: 20°41′17″S 48°24′45″W
- Country: Brazil
- Region: Southeast
- State: São Paulo

Area
  - Total: 273 km^{2} (105 sq mi)

Population (2020)
  - Total: 6,946
  - Density: 25.4/km^{2} (65.9/sq mi)
- Time zone: UTC−3 (BRT)

Jaborandi is a Brazilian municipality of the state of São Paulo, located 491 kilometers from the state capital, São Paulo. The population is 6,946 (2020 estimate) in an area of 273 km^{2}.

== History ==
A settlement was founded in 1902 on the right bank of the stream Jaborandi, which takes its name from the plant jaborandi, which grows abundantly on its banks. In 1924 the district of Jaborandy was created. In 1948 Jaborandi was separated from the municipality of Colina and became an independent municipality.

Map of the state of São Paulo (1948).

== Geography ==
Located in the northern part of the state, Jaborandi is 491 km from the city of São Paulo. The bordering munícipalities are Barretos, Morro Agudo, Terra Roxa and Colina. Its altitude is 493 meters. It has fertile lands (dark red latosol). The main river is the Rio Pardo.

Its climate is predominantly tropical, with low average temperature of 12 °C (period of July–August) and maximum average of 30 °C (period of January–February).

== Politics ==
The mayors of Jaborandi:

- March 26, 1949 - March 26, 1953 - Orlando Junqueira de Oliveira
- March 27, 1953 - March 26, 1953 - Dr. Amadeu Pagliuso
- March 27, 1957 - March 26, 1957 - Luiz Ferreira
- March 27, 1961 - March 26, 1965 - Antônio Bruno
- March 27, 1965 - March 26, 1969 - Luiz Ferreira (re-elected)
- March 27, 1969 - January 30, 1973 - João Manuel Diniz Junqueira
- January 31, 1973 - January 31, 1977 - Luiz Ferreira (re-elected)
- February 2, 1977 - January 31, 1983 - João Manuel Diniz Junqueira (re-elected)
- February 2, 1983 - December 31, 1988 - José Baltazar dos Santos
- January 1, 1989 - December 31, 1992 - João Paulo Pires da Silva
- January 1, 1993 - December 12, 1996 - Silvio Vaz de Almeida
- January 1, 1997 - December 31, 2000 - Jorge Assad Chabrour
- January 1, 2001 - December 31, 2004 - Ronan Sales Cardozo
- January 1, 2005 - December 31, 2008 - Marcoantonio Pinto Neto

== Media ==
In telecommunications, the city was served by Companhia Telefônica Brasileira until 1973, when it began to be served by Telecomunicações de São Paulo. In July 1998, this company was acquired by Telefónica, which adopted the Vivo brand in 2012.

The company is currently an operator of cell phones, fixed lines, internet (fiber optics/4G) and television (satellite and cable).

== Religion ==
Christianity is present in the city as follows:

=== Catholic Church ===
The Catholic church in the municipality is part of the Roman Catholic Diocese of Barretos.

=== Protestant Church ===
The most diverse evangelical beliefs are present in the city, mainly Pentecostal, including the Assemblies of God in Brazil (the largest evangelical church in the country), Christian Congregation in Brazil, among others. These denominations are growing more and more throughout Brazil.

== See also ==
- List of municipalities in São Paulo
