= Guarinos =

- Municipality
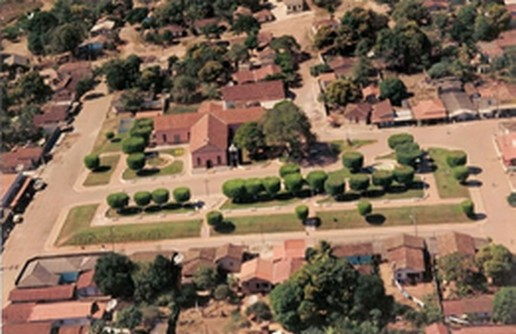

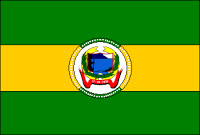
- Flag

- Location in Goiás state

- Location in Brazil
- Coordinates: 14°42′44″S 49°42′01″W
- Country: Brazil
- Region: Central-West
- State: Goiás
- Microregion: Ceres

Area
  - Total: 596 km^{2} (230 sq mi)
- Elevation: 480 m (1,570 ft)

Population (2020)
  - Total: 1,737
  - Density: 2.91/km^{2} (7.55/sq mi)
- Time zone: UTC−3 (BRT)
- Postal code: 76385-000

Guarinos is a municipality in northern Goiás state, Brazil. The population was 2,411 (2007) in a total area of 595.8 km^{2} (230.0 mi^{2}).

== Highway Connections ==
Connections are made from Goiânia by GO-080 / Nerópolis / São Francisco de Goiás / BR-153 / Jaraguá / Rianápolis / Rialma / GO-336 / Itapaci / GO-154 / Pilar de Goiás / GO-439. (18 km (11 mi) unpaved)

Neighboring municipalities are Pilar de Goiás, Itapaci, Crixás, Nova América, and Santa Terezinha de Goiás

== Demographics ==
- Population growth rate: -2.51% from 1996/2007
- Urban population: 1174
- Rural population: 1237.

== The economy ==
The main economic activities were cattle raising, agriculture and services. There were 23 retail units in August 2007. There were only 35 automobiles in 2007, the lowest number in the state. In 2006 there were 363 farms with a total area of 33,095 ha (81,780 acres), of which only 350 hectares were cropland. The main agricultural activities were cattle raising (26,100 head in 2007), and cultivation of rice, beans, manioc, corn, and bananas.

== Health and education ==
The literacy rate was 83.3% in 2000, while there were 5 schools with 594 students in 2006. There were no hospitals and only one doctor. The infant mortality rate was 33.15 in 1,000 live births while the score on the MHDI (Municipal Human Development Index was 0.694 The state ranking was 214 (out of 242 municipalities in 2000) and the national ranking was 3,096 (out of 5,507 municipalities in 2000). Data are from 2000.

== See also ==
- List of municipalities in Goiás
