= Ipiranga de Goiás =

- Municipality
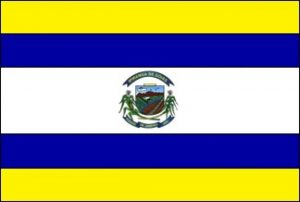
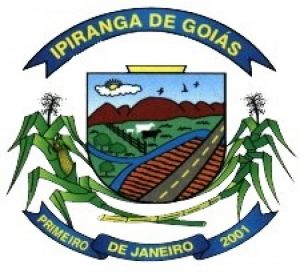
- Flag Coat of arms

- Location in Goiás state

- Location in Brazil
- Coordinates: 15°10′21″S 49°40′07″W
- Country: Brazil
- Region: Central-West
- State: Goiás
- Microregion: Ceres

Area
  - Total: 241 km^{2} (93 sq mi)
- Elevation: 623 m (2,044 ft)

Population (2020)
  - Total: 2,893
  - Density: 12.0/km^{2} (31.1/sq mi)
- Time zone: UTC−3 (BRT)
- Postal code: 76304-000

Ipiranga de Goiás is a municipality in north-central Goiás state, Brazil.

== Municipal Boundaries ==
Ipiranga has boundaries with: Ceres, Itapaci, Nova Glória and Rubiataba. Ipiranga is 219 kilometers from the state capital, Goiânia.

== Highway Connections from Goiânia ==
Highway connections from Goiânia are made by GO-080 / Nerópolis / São Francisco de Goiás / BR-153 / Jaraguá / Rialma / GO-434.

== History ==
The history of Ipiranga de Goiás is connected to the decree of 1941 creating the agricultural colony called Colonia Agrícola Nacional de Goiás, administered by the engineer Bernardo Sayão. In 1949 the dentist Raimundo Alves de Souza arrived with his family and fought to make a city out of Ipiranga. In 1956 he acquired lands and divided them into lots to attract settlers. Ipiranga became a district of Ceres in 1968 and became a municipality in 1998. See Ipiranga de Goiás for the history.

== Demographics ==
- Population density: 11.65 inhabitants/km^{2} (2007)
- Total population in 2001: 2,804
- Total population in 2007: 2,813
- Urban population in 2007: 843
- Rural population in 2007: 1,970
- Population growth rate: n/a

== The economy ==
The main economic activities are cattle raising and agriculture. There were 416 farms in 2006 with a total area of 18,494 hectares, of which 5,400 hectares were cropland and 11,683 hectares were pasture. There were 23,000 head of cattle in 2006. The main crops were rice, sugarcane (3,300 hectares), manioc, corn, and beans.

- Automobiles: 141 in 2007 IBGE

== Health and education ==
There were 06 schools in 2006 with 688 students. There were no hospitals. There are no data available on the Municipal Human Development Index.

== See also ==
- List of municipalities in Goiás
