= São Luíz do Norte =

- Municipality
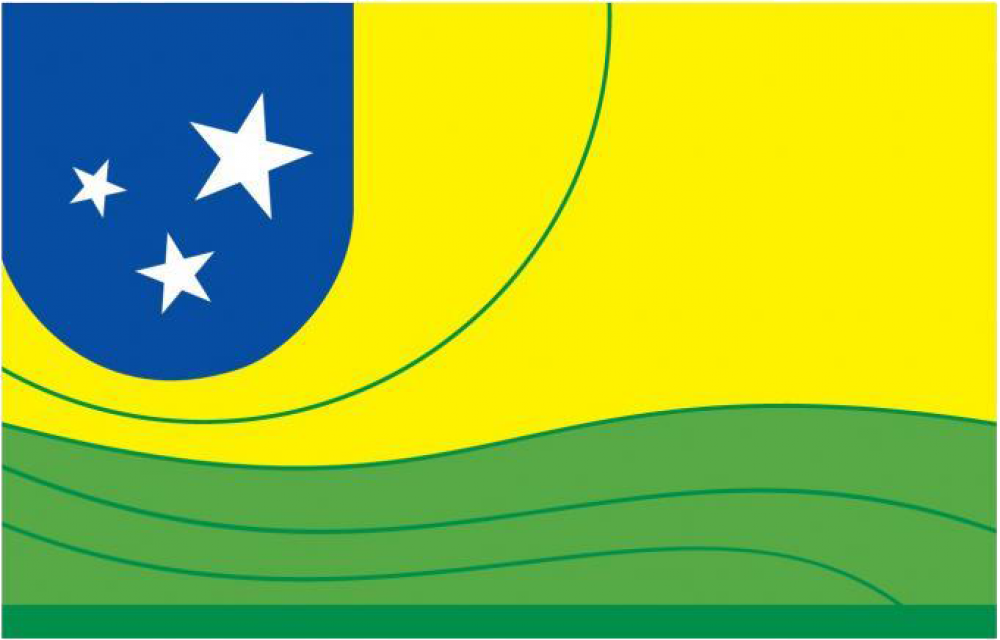
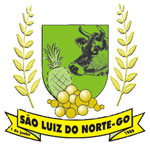
- Flag Coat of arms

- Location in Goiás state

- Location in Brazil
- Coordinates: 14°51′52″S 49°19′58″W
- Country: Brazil
- Region: Central-West
- State: Goiás
- Microregion: Ceres Microregion

Area
  - Total: 586.0 km^{2} (226.3 sq mi)
- Elevation: 564 m (1,850 ft)

Population (2020)
  - Total: 5,215
  - Density: 8.899/km^{2} (23.05/sq mi)
- Time zone: UTC−3 (BRT)
- Postal code: 76365-000
- Website: www.saoluizdonorte.go.gov.br

São Luíz do Norte is a municipality in northeastern Goiás state, Brazil. An alternative spelling is "São Luís do Norte".

== Location ==
São Luíz is located 58 km. north of Ceres on the important BR-153 highway.

- Highway connections from Goiânia: GO-080 / Nerópolis / São Francisco de Goiás / BR-153 / Jaraguá / Rialma / 57 km north on BR-153. See Seplan

Neighboring municipalities: Hidrolina, Santa Rita do Novo Destino, Goianésia, Santa Isabel, Nova Glória and Itapaci.

== Demographics ==
- Urban population: 3,557
- Population density: 7.28 inhabitants/km^{2} (2007)
- Population growth rate: 0.63% 1996/2007

== The Economy ==
The economy is based on subsistence agriculture, cattle raising, services, public administration, and small transformation industries. There was one dairy—G.G. Teixeira e Cia Ltda—in 2007. In 2006 there were 161 farms with a total area of 35,883 hectares, 19,000 hectares being pasture. The cattle herd had 31,000 head in 2007. The main crops were pineapple, sugarcane (5,600 hectares), rice (300 hectares), beans, manioc, corn (300 hectares), and soybeans (3,600 hectares).

== Health and Education ==
In the educational sector there were 6 schools. The adult literacy rate was 80.5% (2000) (national average was 86.4%). There were no hospitals in 2007. The infant mortality rate was 25,32 (2000) (national average was 33.0). The score on the Human Development Index was 0.710. For the complete list see frigoletto.com.br

== See also ==
- List of municipalities in Goiás
- Microregions of Goiás
