= Nova América =

- Municipality
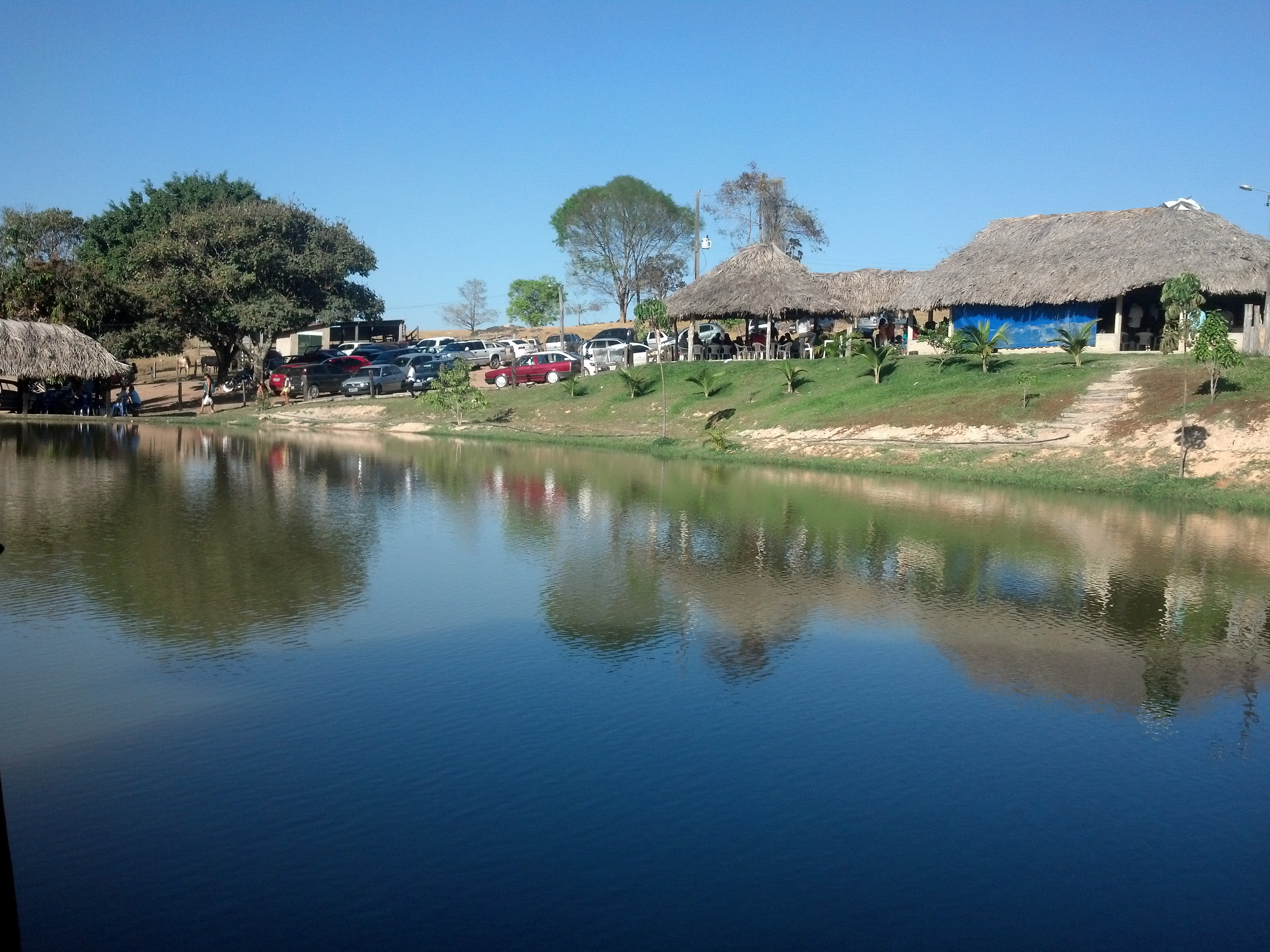

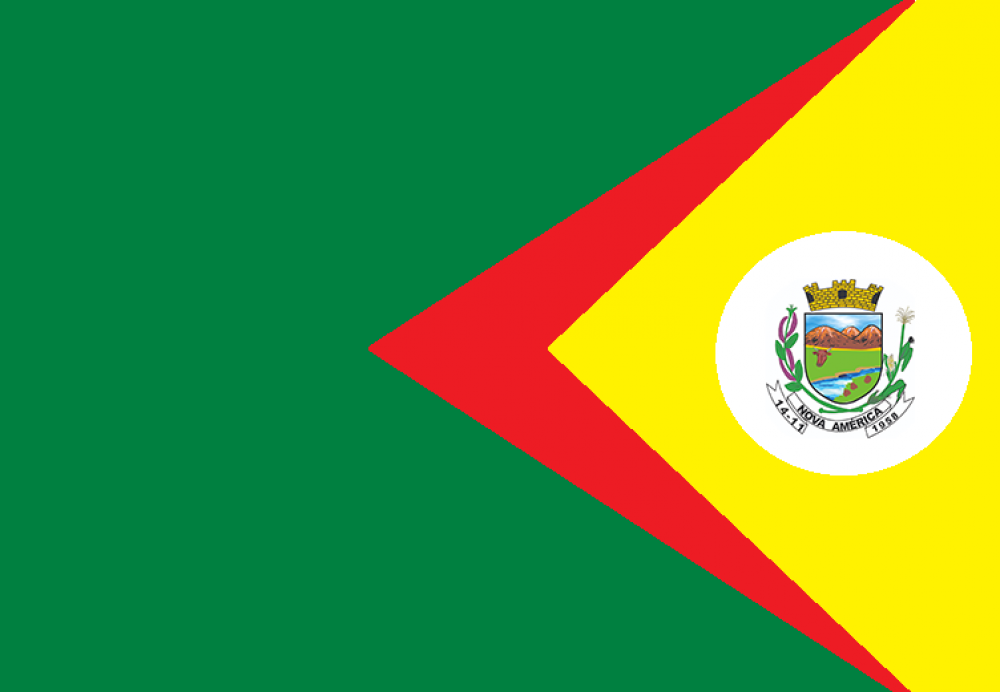
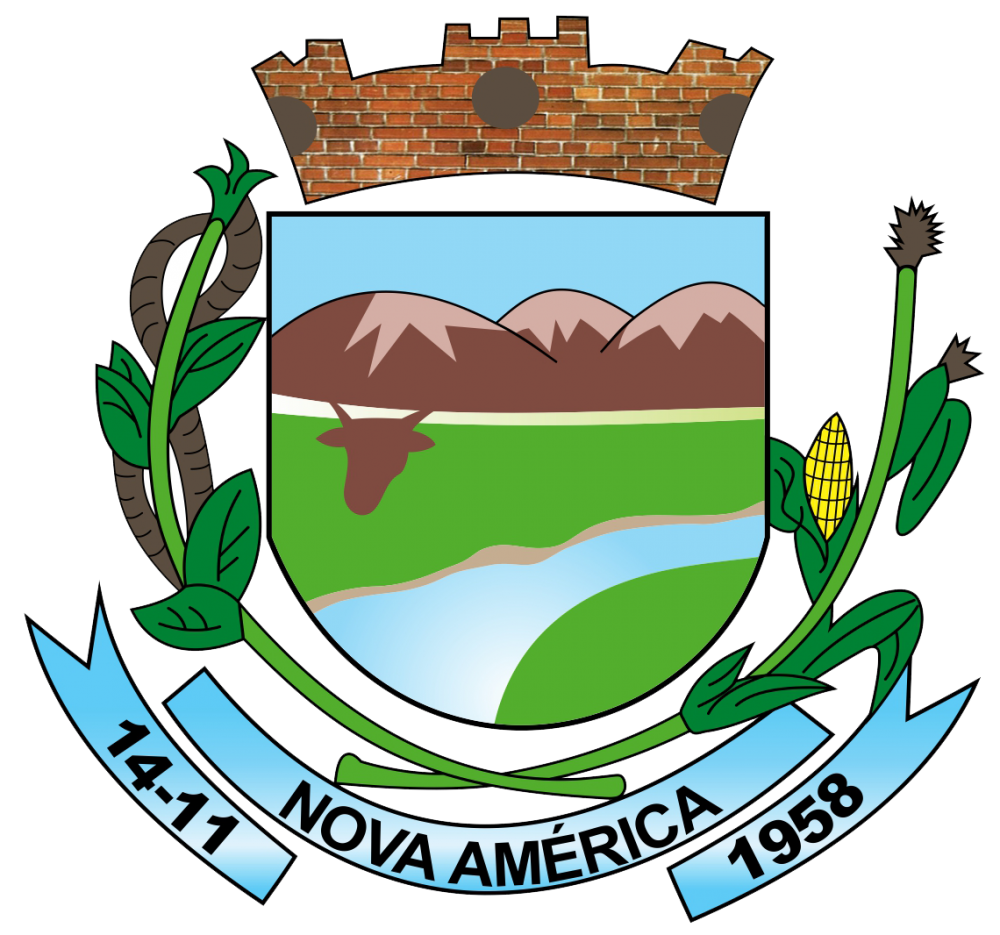
- Flag Coat of arms

- Location in Goiás state

- Location in Brazil
- Coordinates: 15°01′25″S 49°53′31″W
- Country: Brazil
- Region: Central-West
- State: Goiás
- Microregion: Ceres

Area
  - Total: 212 km^{2} (82 sq mi)
- Elevation: 796 m (2,612 ft)

Population (2020)
  - Total: 2,357
  - Density: 11.1/km^{2} (28.8/sq mi)
- Time zone: UTC−3 (BRT)
- Postal code: 76345-000

Nova América is a municipality in northeastern Goiás state, Brazil.

== Location ==
Nova América is located 71 km. east of Ceres and the important BR-153 highway. Nearby towns are Rubiataba, 21 km., Crixás, 55 km., and Nova Glória, 45 km.

- Distance to Goiânia: 256 km.
- Highway connections: GO-080 / Nerópolis / São Francisco de Goiás / BR-153 / Rialma / GO-434 / Rubiataba. See Seplan

Neighboring municipalities: Rubiataba, Itapaci, Crixás, and Mozarlândia

== Demographics ==
In 2007 the population density of the municipality was 10.38 inhabitants/km^{2}. The urban population was 1,532 and the rural population was 668. The geometric growth rate was 0.07% for the period 1996/2007.

== History ==
Nova América began in 1944 on the banks of the Baunilha River. The first settler was José Jeremias do Couto who raised cattle. In 1952 he divided part of his land into lots and donated them to settlers. The first name of the settlement was "Baunilha", after the river. In 1952 it was raised to a district belonging to Itapaci with the name "América", after the wife of its founder, América do Couto. In 1958 it was dismembered to become a municipality.

== The economy ==
The economy is based on modest agriculture, cattle raising, services, and public employment. In 2007 there were only 2 industrial units and 14 retail units in the town. There were no financial institutions. In 2007 there were 258 automobiles.

There were 269 farms in 2006 with a total area of 21,804 hectares, of which 800 hectares were cropland and 16,400 hectares were pasture. In 2006 there were 21,000 head of cattle and a modest number of poultry and swine. The main agricultural products were rice, sugarcane, and corn, none surpassing 500 hectares in planted area.

== Health and education ==
In 2007 there was only 1 walk-in health clinic in the town. In 2000 the infant mortality rate was 26.46, below the national average of 35.0.

In 2006 the school system had 4 schools, 19 classrooms, 54 teachers, and 794 students. In 2000 the adult literacy rate was 82.4%, which was below the national average of 86.4%.

Ranking on the Municipal Human Development Index

- MHDI: 0.715
- State ranking: 183 (out of 242 municipalities)
- National ranking: 2,704 (out of 5,507 municipalities)

For the complete list see frigoletto.com.br
