= Santa Isabel, Goiás =

Santa Isabel
- Municipality
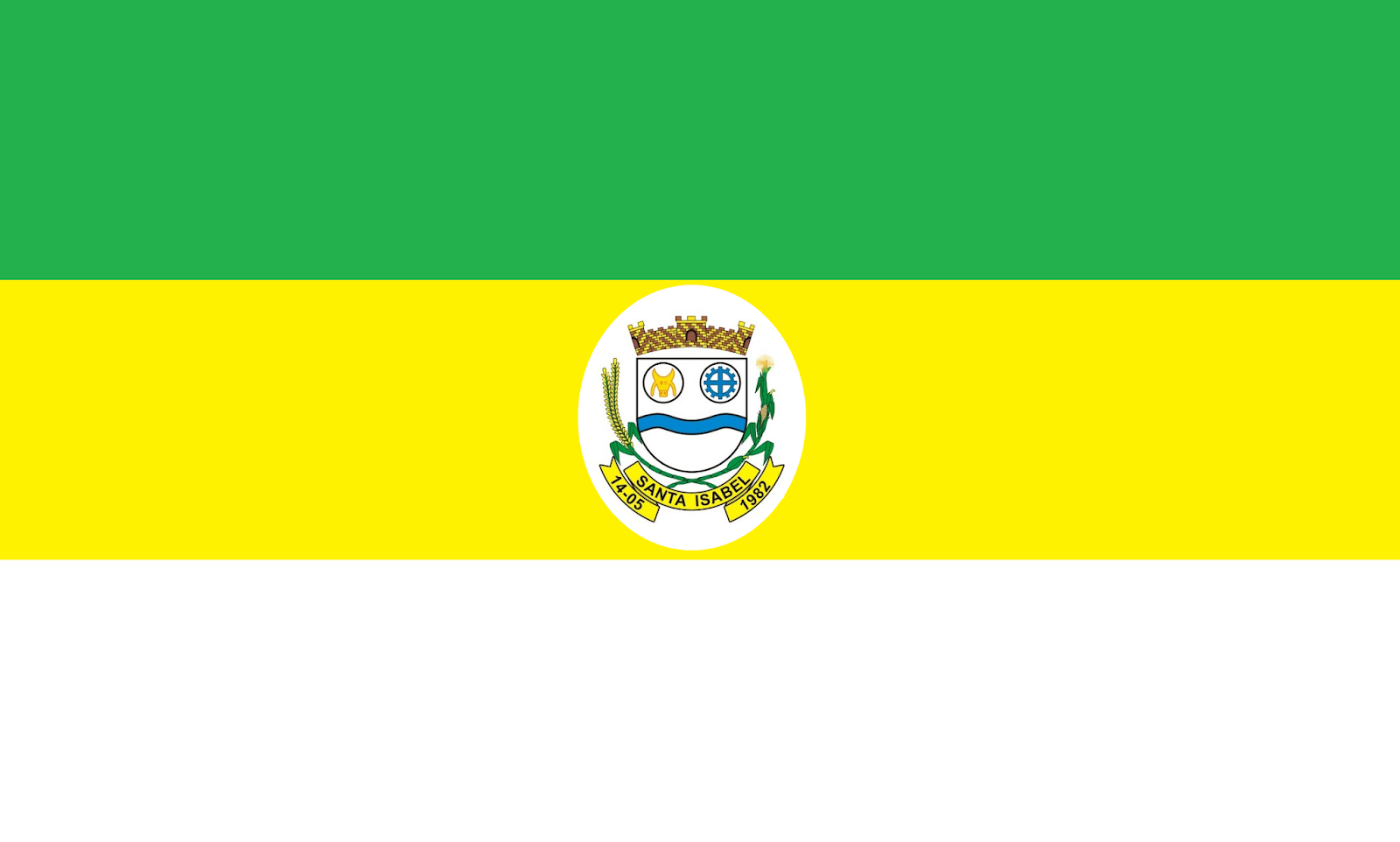
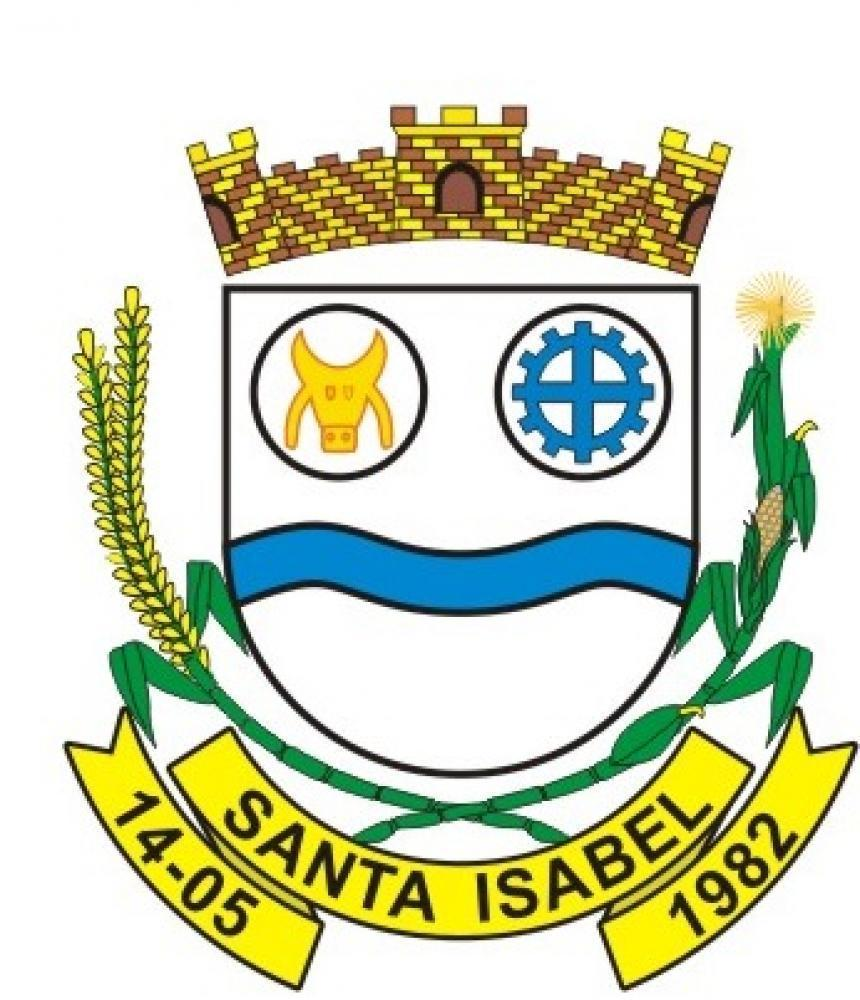
- Flag Coat of arms

- Location in Goiás state

- Location in Brazil
- Coordinates: 15°17′15″S 49°25′34″W
- Country: Brazil
- Region: Central-West
- State: Goiás
- Microregion: Ceres Microregion

Area
  - Total: 806.8 km^{2} (311.5 sq mi)
- Elevation: 611 m (2,005 ft)

Population (2020)
  - Total: 3,815
  - Density: 4.729/km^{2} (12.25/sq mi)
- Time zone: UTC−3 (BRT)
- Postal code: 76320-000

Santa Isabel is a municipality in north-central Goiás state, Brazil.

== Location ==
It is 21 kilometers from Ceres, the nearest regional center. Santa Isabel has municipal boundaries with Rubiataba, Itapaci, Nova Glória, Rialma, and Carmo do Rio Verde. Access from Goiânia is made by GO-080 / Nerópolis / São Francisco de Goiás / BR-153 / Jaraguá / Rianápolis / Rialma / GO-480. See Seplan

== Politics and Demographics ==
The mayor was Laurismar Batista Borges (January 2005) and there were 9 city council members. The number of eligible voters was 2,867 (December/2007).

The population density was 4.32 inhabitants/km^{2} (2007) with 1,328 (2007) urban inhabitants and 2,157 rural inhabitants. The population has decreased about 400 people since 1991.

== The Economy ==
The economy is based on modest agriculture, cattle raising, services, public administration, and small transformation industries. There were only 130 automobiles. There were 535 farms in 2006, with 75% of the land in pasture. The cattle herd had 74,000 head while the main crops were rice, sugarcane, beans, manioc, corn (800 hectares), and soybeans.

== Health and Education ==
There were 5 schools. The adult literacy rate was 82.5% (2000) (the national average was 86.4%) There were no hospitals. The infant mortality rate was 26.34 (2000) (the national average was 33.0)

Human Development Index: 0.720

- State ranking: 174 (out of 242 municipalities)
- National ranking: 2,617 (out of 5,507 municipalities)

For the complete list see frigoletto.com.br

== See also ==
- List of municipalities in Goiás
- Microregions of Goiás
