= Santa Rita do Novo Destino =

- Municipality
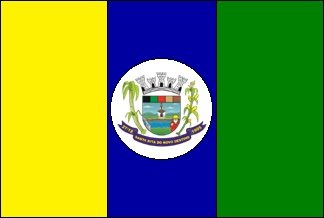
- Flag

- Location in Goiás state

- Location in Brazil
- Coordinates: 15°08′08″S 49°07′05″W
- Country: Brazil
- Region: Central-West
- State: Goiás
- Microregion: Ceres Microregion

Area
  - Total: 956.0 km^{2} (369.1 sq mi)
- Elevation: 790 m (2,590 ft)

Population (2020)
  - Total: 3,355
  - Density: 3.509/km^{2} (9.089/sq mi)
- Time zone: UTC−3 (BRT)
- Postal code: 76395-000

Santa Rita do Novo Destino is a municipality in northeastern Goiás state, Brazil.

== Location ==
Santa Rita do Novo Destino is 82 km. east of Ceres and 15 km. north of Goianésia. Highway connections from Goiânia are made by taking GO-080 / Nerópolis / São Francisco de Goiás / BR-153 / Jaraguá / GO-080 / Goianésia / GO-438. Seplan

Neighboring municipalities: Hidrolina, São Luíz do Norte, Barro Alto, and Santa Isabel

== Demographics ==
- Urban population: 1,156
- Population density: 3.53 inhabitants/km^{2} (2007)
- Population growth rate: 1.56% 2000/2007

== The Economy ==
The economy is based on subsistence agriculture, cattle raising, services, public administration, and small transformation industries. In 2006 there were 476 farms with a total area of 70,126 hectares. Of this pasture land made up 48,000 hectares. There were 48,000 head of cattle. The main crops were rice, sugarcane (2,450 hectares), manioc, corn (1,000 hectares), and soybeans (1,500 hectares).

== Health and Education ==
The adult literacy rate was 78.8% (2000) (national average was 86.4%) and the infant mortality rate was 33.10 (2000) (national average was 33.0). In 2007 there were no hospitals and there were 5 schools.

Human Development Index: 0.684

- State ranking: 221 (out of 242 municipalities)
- National ranking: 3,246 (out of 5,507 municipalities)

For the complete list see frigoletto.com.br

== See also ==
- List of municipalities in Goiás
