= Goianésia =

- Municipality
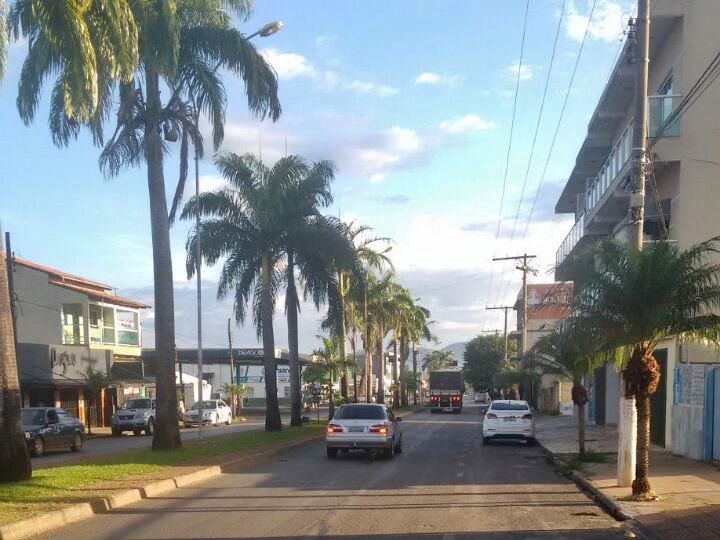

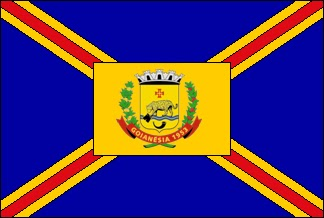
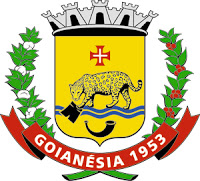
- Flag Coat of arms

- Location in Goiás state

- Location in Brazil
- Coordinates: 15°19′26″S 49°7′8″W
- Country: Brazil
- Region: Central-West
- State: Goiás
- Microregion: Ceres Microregion

Area
  - Total: 1,547.65 km^{2} (597.55 sq mi)
- Elevation: 640 m (2,100 ft)

Population (2020)
  - Total: 71,075
  - Density: 45.924/km^{2} (118.94/sq mi)
- Time zone: UTC−3 (BRT)
- Postal code: 76380-000
- Website: www.goianesia.go.gov.br

Goianésia (Brazilian Portuguese pronunciation: [ɡojaˈnɛzjɐ]) is a municipality in central Goiás, Brazil. It belongs to the Immediate Geographic Region of Ceres-Rialma-Goianésia and, since 2024, has been part of the Integrated Development Region of the Federal District and Surrounding Areas (RIDE-DF).

Roughly 170 kilometers from the state capital, Goiânia, and about 230 kilometers from the federal capital, Brasília, Goianésia has a population of 73,707, according to the 2022 census by the Brazilian Institute of Geography and Statistics (IBGE). It is the most populous city among the 23 municipalities in the São Patrício Valley and is known locally as the "Princess of the Valley" due to its growth and regional influence.

Settlement in the area came relatively late, driven by families from Minas Gerais and other states. This movement gained momentum in the second half of the 20th century, fueled by the expansion of agriculture in Brazil's Central-West. Today, Goianésia is a major center for sugar and ethanol production in the state, with three active mills and a strong agro-industrial presence.

== Location ==
Goianésia is located almost due north of Anápolis (150 km), 54 km from the Belém-Brasília highway. Goiânia, the state capital is 182 km away, while Brasília, the national capital is 280 km. away. Highway connections from Goiânia are made by GO-080 / Nerópolis / São Francisco de Goiás / BR-153 / Jaraguá / GO-080. See Seplan for the complete list.

Municipal boundaries:

- Norte: São Luíz do Norte and Santa Rita do Novo Destino
- South: Jaraguá and Pirenópolis
- East: Santa Isabel
- West: Barro Alto and Vila Propício

The municipality contains the sources of the Peixes, Bois, and Patos rivers. Average annual temperatures range from 22 to 25 degrees Celsius.

== Demographic data ==
- Population growth rate 2000/2007: 1.30.%
- Urban population in 2007: 40,934
- Rural population in 2007: 3,872

== Economy ==
Agro-industry plays a large role in the economy of the municipality, with importance given to the production of alcohol and sugar. Two destillaries are located in the town, both processing alcohol and sugar.

Sugar cane is the most important crop of Goianésia, with a planted area of more than 12,000 hectares. Corn, dry farmed rice, and soybeans are also important crops. Tomato production has also increased as well as the planting of rubber trees.

Most of the small rural properties have milk as their main source of income, which is used to supply the dairies of the region. Cattle raising is still important with the municipality having 109,000 head in 2006, of which 25,500 were dairy cattle.

Other activities relevant to the economy are: meat packing, production of feed, mineral salt, gravel, and bricks.

- Industrial units: 92 (06/2007)
- Retail units: 638 (08/2007)
- Banking institutions: 4 (08/2007)
- Dairies: 2 (05/2006)
- Distilleries: 2 (07/2007)
- Meatpacking units: 1 (05/2006)
- Industrial Area: Distrito Agroindustrial – DAIAGO (2007)
- Automobiles: 5,459 in 2004 (IBGE/Sepin)

In 2006 there were 816 farms employing 1,500 workers. The total agricultural area was 106,550 ha., of which 12,000 ha. were planted in crops, 73,000 ha. were natural pasture, and 18,000 ha. were forest or woodland. There were 203 tractors on 131 of the farms.

== Education and health ==
- Literacy rate: 86.3%
- Infant mortality rate: 25.58 in 1,000 live births
- Schools: 51 (2006)
- Students: 15,548
- Higher education: UEG – Faculdade de Educação, Ciências e Letras de Goianésia, Faculdade Betel de Goianésia – FABEGO.
- Hospitals: 5 (2007)
- Hospital beds: 199 (IBGE/Sepin)
- Municipal Human Development Index 0.743
- State ranking: 95 (out of 242 municipalities in 2000)
- National ranking: 2,064 (out of 5,507 municipalities in 2000)

For the complete list see frigoletto.com.br

== Communications ==
Goianésia has one interstate and intermunicipal bus company which maintains links with Goiânia, Brasília, and other cities in Goiás. There is a municipal airport with a paved runway of 1,300 meters.

== Climate ==
Climate data for Goianésia (1981–2010)
| Month | Jan | Feb | Mar | Apr | May | Jun | Jul | Aug | Sep | Oct | Nov | Dec | Year |
|---|---|---|---|---|---|---|---|---|---|---|---|---|---|
| Mean daily maximum °C (°F) | 29.8 (85.6) | 30.2 (86.4) | 30.3 (86.5) | 30.8 (87.4) | 30.4 (86.7) | 29.8 (85.6) | 30.3 (86.5) | 32.2 (90.0) | 33.2 (91.8) | 32.4 (90.3) | 30.3 (86.5) | 29.4 (84.9) | 30.8 (87.4) |
| Daily mean °C (°F) | 24.0 (75.2) | 24.1 (75.4) | 24.1 (75.4) | 24.1 (75.4) | 23.2 (73.8) | 21.9 (71.4) | 22.2 (72.0) | 24.1 (75.4) | 25.8 (78.4) | 25.6 (78.1) | 24.3 (75.7) | 24.0 (75.2) | 24.0 (75.2) |
| Mean daily minimum °C (°F) | 20.2 (68.4) | 20.2 (68.4) | 20.1 (68.2) | 19.6 (67.3) | 17.8 (64.0) | 15.8 (60.4) | 15.7 (60.3) | 17.4 (63.3) | 19.8 (67.6) | 20.5 (68.9) | 20.3 (68.5) | 20.4 (68.7) | 19.0 (66.2) |
| Average precipitation mm (inches) | 274.3 (10.80) | 217.9 (8.58) | 209.3 (8.24) | 91.4 (3.60) | 16.4 (0.65) | 7.0 (0.28) | 2.8 (0.11) | 7.8 (0.31) | 42.2 (1.66) | 128.8 (5.07) | 223.3 (8.79) | 297.7 (11.72) | 1,518.9 (59.80) |
| Average precipitation days (≥ 1.0 mm) | 18 | 14 | 14 | 7 | 2 | 1 | 0 | 1 | 4 | 10 | 15 | 19 | 105 |
| Average relative humidity (%) | 80.0 | 79.6 | 79.1 | 74.7 | 66.9 | 59.1 | 52.2 | 46.2 | 50.2 | 64.2 | 75.7 | 80.5 | 67.4 |
| Mean monthly sunshine hours | 154.0 | 154.5 | 181.2 | 222.5 | 260.5 | 263.8 | 281.0 | 274.8 | 211.6 | 188.4 | 146.4 | 131.6 | 2,470.3 |
Source: Instituto Nacional de Meteorologia

== See also ==
- List of municipalities in Goiás
