= Itapaci =

- Municipality
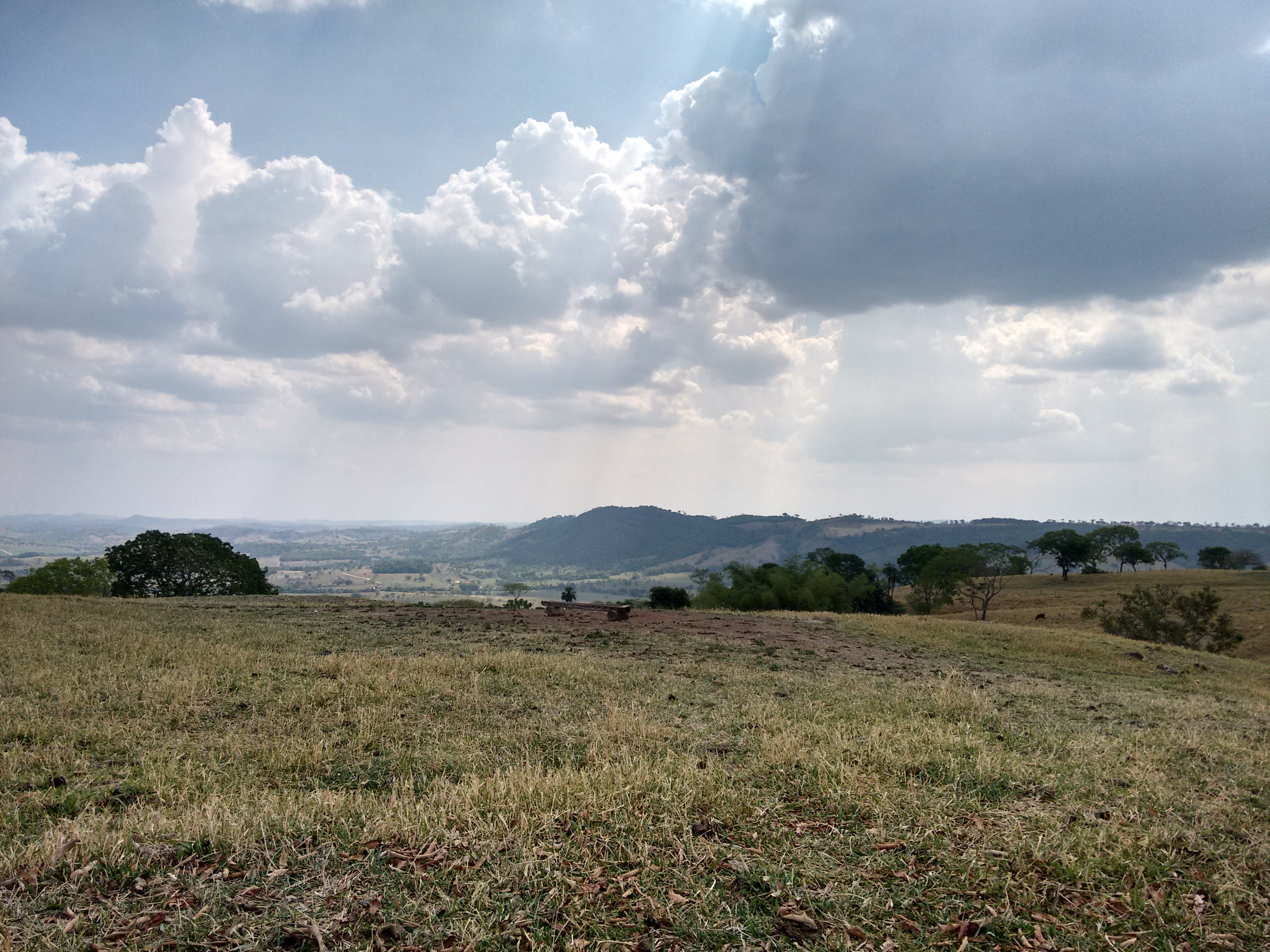

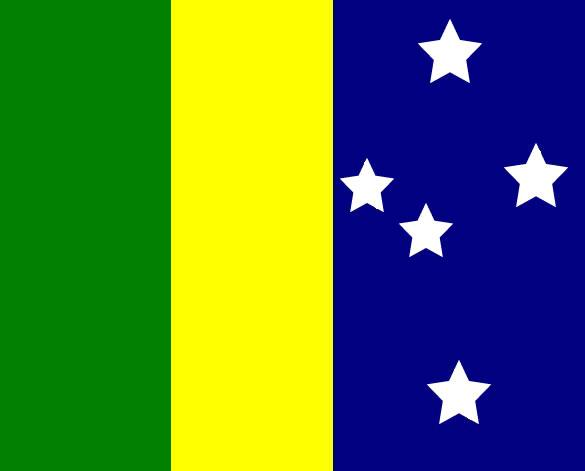
- Flag

- Location in Goiás state

- Location in Brazil
- Coordinates: 14°57′40″S 49°33′34″W
- Country: Brazil
- Region: Central-West
- State: Goiás
- Microregion: Ceres

Area
  - Total: 956 km^{2} (369 sq mi)
- Elevation: 670 m (2,200 ft)

Population (2020)
  - Total: 23,421
  - Density: 24.5/km^{2} (63.5/sq mi)
- Time zone: UTC−3 (BRT)
- Postal code: 76360-000

Itapaci is a municipality in northern Goiás state, Brazil. The population was 18,458 in 2010 (IBGE). The total area of the municipality was 956.1 km^{2} (10/10/2002).

== History ==
The settlement began in the 1920s on the lands of the Água Fria and Barra cattle ranches. Land was donated by a rancher called Domiciano Rodrigues Peixoto and a cross was erected in 1935. The first name was Água Fria, later changed to Floresta. In 1938 it became a district with the name Itapaci, which means "Beautiful Rock". In 1945 it was raised to municipal status.

== Geography ==
Itapaci is located on the São Patrício Pequeno River in the Ceres Microregion. The distance to the state capital, Goiânia, is 230 kilometers. Highway connections are made by GO-080 / Nerópolis / São Francisco de Goiás / BR-153 / Jaraguá / Rialma / GO-336. See Seplan for the complete list.

Neighboring municipalities are: Crixás, Guarinos, Hidrolina, Ipiranga de Goiás, Nova América, Nova Glória, Pilar de Goiás, Rubiataba and São Luíz do Norte.

=== Climate ===
- The climate is tropical humid with high maximum temperatures that can reach 37 °C. The natural resources of the town are its mineral wealth. There are deposits of mica, crystal, asbestos, and gold. In the forests there are stands of hardwood.

=== Districts, Villages, and Hamlets ===
- District: Aparecida de Goiás.
- Village: Ponte Nova.
- Hamlets: Santo Agostinho, São José do Caiamar, Vila Santana and Vila Trindade.

== Demographics ==
Data obtained by the 2010 Census conducted by the IBGE (Brazilian Institute of Geography and Statistics)

Value of the average monthly income per household	R$1,020.00
Permanent private households	5,921
Value of the average monthly income per person over 10 years old	R$510.00
Deaths of children under 1 year old, occurred from August 2009 to July 2010	2
People's deaths occurred from August 2009 to July 2010	106
Total living in permanent private households	18,389
Urban people living in permanent private households	16,617
Countryside people living in permanent private households	1,772
Literacy rate of people with 5 years old or older	87.6%
People with 5 years old or over, literate	15,030
Men with 10 years old or older	7,701
Women with 10 years old or older	7,941
Resident population	18,458
People living in private households	18,419
People aged 0 to 4 years old	1,300
People aged 5 to 9 years old	1,516
People aged 10 to 14 years old	1,707
People aged 15 to 17 years old	1,022
People aged 18 to 19 years old	623
People aged 20 to 24 years old	1,607
People aged 25 to 29 years old	1,556
People aged 30 to 34 years old	1,505
People aged 35 to 39 years old	1,444
People aged 40 to 49 years old	2,614
People aged 50 to 59 years old	1,683
People aged 60 to 69 years old	1,073
People aged 70 years old or older	808

== The economy ==
The economy is based on livestock raising, agriculture, and services. In 2006 there were 425 farms with a total area of 51,805 hectares, of which 3,500 hectares were cropland and 38,600 hectares were pasture. Cattle raising is the main economic activity with 75,000 head in 2006. There are plantations of rice, beans, corn, peanuts, and manioc. The main crop was sugarcane with 4,800 ha. planted in 2006 and a production of 384,000 tons.

- Industrial establishments: 24
- Retail commercial establishments: 176
- Distillery: Vale Verde Empreendimentos Agrícolas Ltda. (July/2007)
- Financial institutions: Banco do Brasil S.A., Banco Itaú S.A, Caixa Econômica Federal, Banco Bradesco S.A. (10/04/2012)

== Health and education ==
In 2007 there were 12 schools in activity with 5,853 students. There was a campus of the Universidade Estadual de Goiás. The literacy rate was 85.4% in 2000. There were 02 hospitals with 99 beds and 15 doctors. The infant mortality rate was 31.12 in 2000 (in 1,000 live births)

- Municipal Human Development Index: 0.724
- State ranking: 56 (out of 246 municipalities in 2010)
- National ranking: 2,524 (out of 5,507 municipalities in 2000) For the complete list see frigoletto.com.br

== See also ==
- List of municipalities in Goiás
- Microregions of Goiás
