= Barro Alto, Goiás =

Barro Alto
- Municipality
- Flag

- Location in Goiás state

- Location in Brazil
- Coordinates: 14°58′06″S 48°55′12″W
- Country: Brazil
- Region: Central-West
- State: Goiás
- Microregion: Ceres Microregion

Area
  - Total: 1,231.8 km^{2} (475.6 sq mi)
- Elevation: 605 m (1,985 ft)

Population (2020)
  - Total: 11,408
  - Density: 9.2612/km^{2} (23.987/sq mi)
- Time zone: UTC−3 (BRT)
- Postal code: 76390-000

Barro Alto is a municipality in northern Goiás state, Brazil, famous for its nickel mine and production of rubber. The population was 6,446 in 2007 and the total area of the municipality was 1,231.8 km^{2}.

== Location ==
Barro Alto is in the Ceres Microregion and is in an underpopulated region south of the Serra de Mesa artificial lake. It is 54 kilometers southeast of the important BR-153 highway, which links Anápolis to Belém.

The distance to Goiânia is 228 km. Highway connections are made by GO-080 / Nerópolis / São Francisco de Goiás / BR-153 / Jaraguá / GO-080 / Goianésia and 41 km northeast. See Sepin for complete list.

Neighboring municipalities are:

- north: Niquelândia
- south: Goianésia
- east: Padre Bernardo
- west: Santa Rita do Novo Destino

== History ==
The foundation of Barro Alto began in 1949 on the Fazenda Barro Alto owned by the Silva brothers, who had lived there since 1940. In 1951 a highway connection with Goianésia was opened up, and in 1956 a chapel dedicated to Nossa Senora d'Abadia was built. In 1958 it became a district of Pirenópolis, separating in the same year to become a municipality.

== The economy ==
Barro Alto has an important open pit nickel mine operated by Anglo-American. Other economic activities are cattle raising, agriculture, services, and small transformation industries. Public administration is a big employer with 389 workers. Barro Alto is the largest producer of rubber (coagulated latex) in the state of Goiás. It produced 2,130 tons in 2006. (Sepin There were 53,500 head of cattle (8,200 dairy cows) in 2006. (Sepin) Barro Alto has a large agricultural production. In 2006 there were 296 farms with 1,247 hectares of permanent crops and 3,570 hectares of perennial crops. Pasture land made up 39,000 hectares. The main agricultural products in 2006 were rubber (710 hectares), rice (650 hectares), sugarcane (3,600 hectares), corn (2,300 hectares), and soybeans (1,500 hectares). (Sepin)

== Health and education ==
The town was served by one hospital with 39 beds in 2007. The infant mortality rate in 2000 was 25.06. In the educational sector there were 11 schools with 2,264 students. The literacy rate in 2000 was 79.2%.

The United Nations Human Development Index (2000) ranked Barro Alto 200 out of 242 municipalities in the state of Goiás with a combined life expectancy of 68.5 years, 0.76% adult literacy, and a per capita monthly income of 143.9 reais, which at March 2006 exchange rates was worth 55.2 euros. The HDI for Barro Alto was 0.78.

== See also ==
- List of municipalities in Goiás
