= Hidrolina =

- Municipality
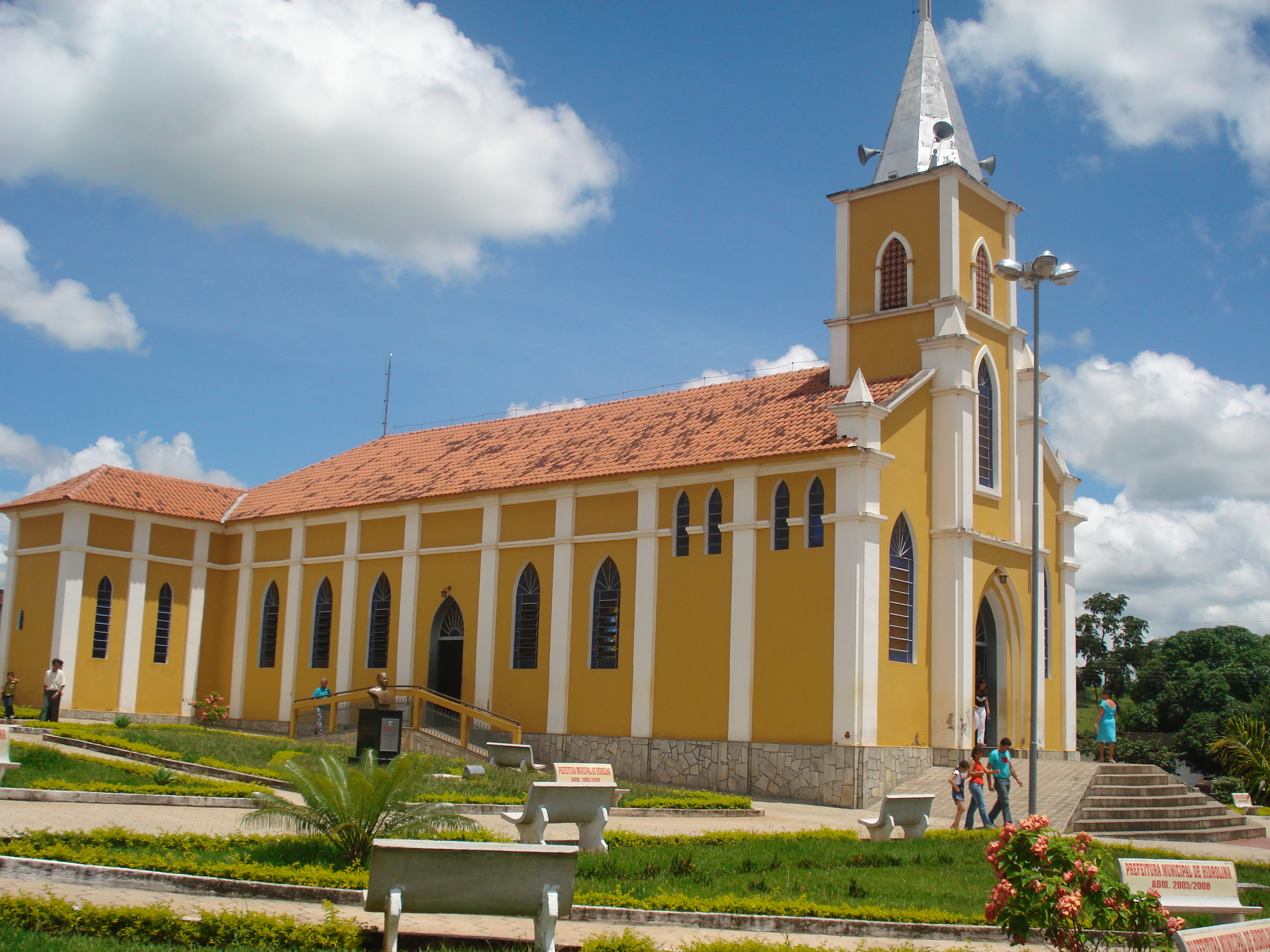

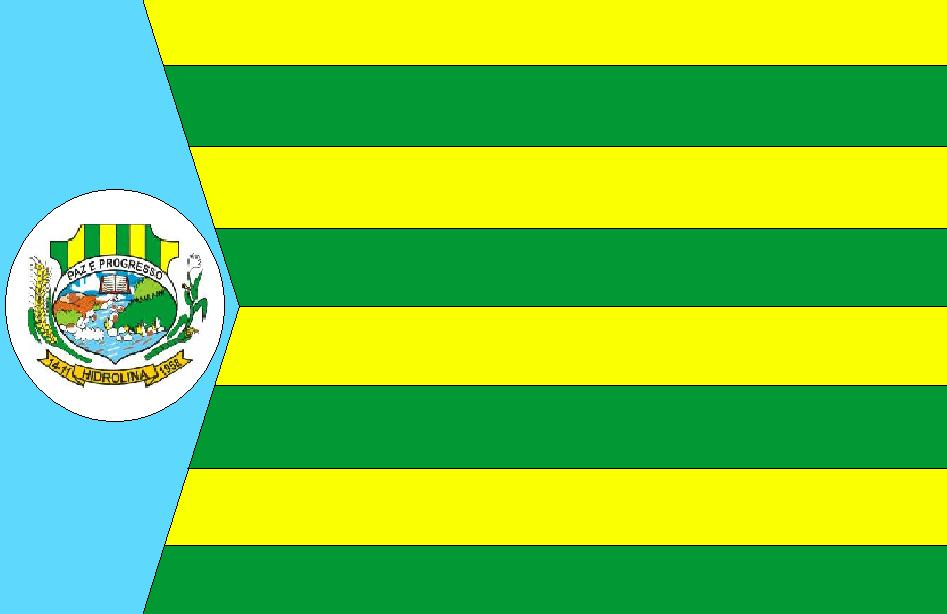
- Flag

- Location in Goiás state

- Location in Brazil
- Coordinates: 14°43′22″S 49°28′01″W
- Country: Brazil
- Region: Central-West
- State: Goiás
- Microregion: Ceres

Area
  - Total: 580 km^{2} (220 sq mi)
- Elevation: 603 m (1,978 ft)

Population (2020)
  - Total: 3,508
  - Density: 6.0/km^{2} (16/sq mi)
- Time zone: UTC−3 (BRT)
- Postal code: 76375-000

Hidrolina is a municipality in north-central Goiás, Brazil. The population was 4,157 (IBGE 2007) and the area of the municipality is 580 km^{2}.

== Location ==
Hidrolina is in the Ceres Microregion north of the state capital, Goiânia. It is 27 kilometers northeast of São Luíz do Norte, which is on the junction with the important BR-153 highway. There is another dirt road going east for 14 kilometers to Pilar de Goiás. The distance to Goiânia is 267 km. and highway connections are made by GO-080 / Nerópolis / São Francisco de Goiás / BR-153 / Jaraguá / Rialma / São Luíz do Norte / GO-338. See Seplan

Municipal boundaries are with:

- north: Uruaçu
- south: São Luíz do Norte
- east: Santa Rita do Novo Destino
- west: Pilar de Goiás

== History ==
Hidrolina began in 1950 with the donation of lands to the Catholic Church by two local ranchers. A chapel was built in homage to Santo Antonio Maria Claret and soon houses were built. The first name was "Lobeira" due to the existence of this tree in the region. In 1958 it was raised to district and the name changed to Hidrolina, because of the presence of many streams. In the same year it became a municipality.

== Demographics ==
- Population density: 7.16 inhabitants/km^{2} (2007)
- Population growth rate: 0.47% from 1996/2007
- Urban population in 1980: 2,375
- Urban population in 2007: 2,991
- Rural population in 1980: 2,438
- Rural population in 2007: 1,166

== The economy ==
The main economic activities are cattle raising, agriculture and services. In 2007 there were 11 industrial units, 43 retail units and one banking institution. There were 341 automobiles in 2007. Farming was the main economic activity and there were 364 farms in 2006 with a total area of 37,038 hectares, of which 2,800 were cropland and the rest either pasture or woodland. The main agricultural activities were cattle raising (35,000 head in 2006) and cultivation of rice, sugarcane, manioc, corn, soybeans and bananas.

== Health and education ==
The literacy rate was 86.3% in 2005 while the infant mortality rate was 31.12 in 1,000 live births, in the same year. There were 07 schools with 1,297 students in 2006. In 20073 there was 01 hospital with 29 beds.

Hidrolina was ranked 114 out of 242 municipalities on the Human Development Index for the state of Goiás. Life expectancy was 66.4 for males and females. Data are from 2000. For the complete list see frigoletto.com.br

== See also ==
- List of municipalities in Goiás
