= Rubiataba =

- Municipality
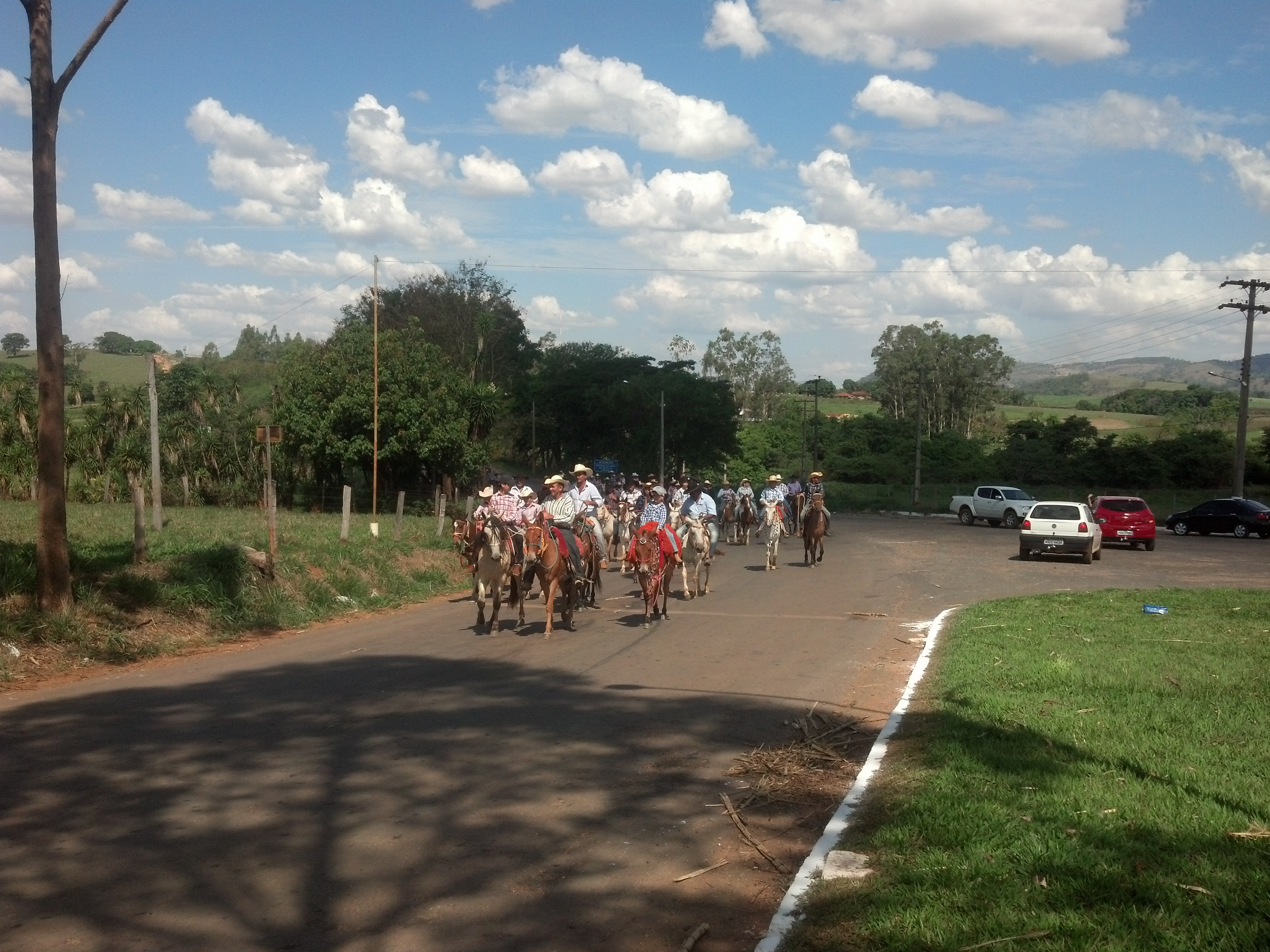

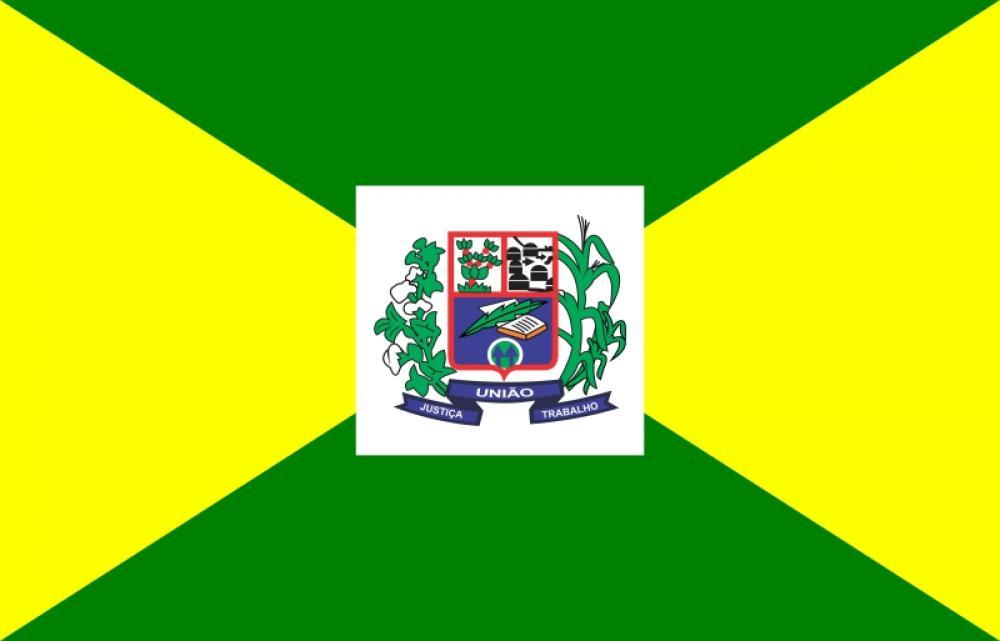
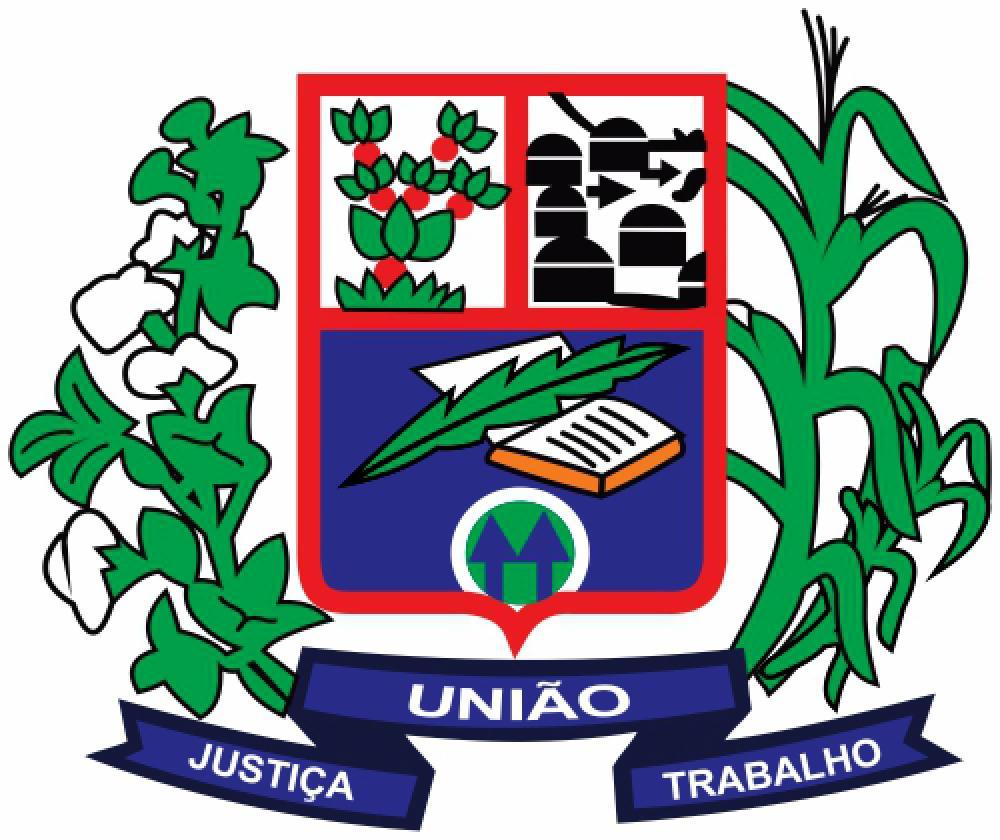
- Flag Coat of arms

- Location in Goiás state

- Location in Brazil
- Coordinates: 15°09′50″S 49°47′57″W
- Country: Brazil
- Region: Central-West
- State: Goiás
- Microregion: Ceres Microregion

Area
  - Total: 748.27 km^{2} (288.91 sq mi)
- Elevation: 800 m (2,600 ft)

Population (2020)
  - Total: 19,947
  - Density: 26.657/km^{2} (69.043/sq mi)
- Time zone: UTC-03:00 (BRT)
  - Summer (DST): UTC-02:00 (BRST)
- Postal code: 76350-000
- Website: rubiataba.go.gov.br

Rubiataba is a municipality in northeastern Goiás state, Brazil.

== Location and Geography ==
Rubiataba is located in the north of the state, south of the source of the Crixás River. It is ~220 kilometres to the state capital of Goiânia. Other distances are:

- Nova América: 21 km. to the north
- Morro Agudo de Goiás: 41 km. to the southwest
- Carmo do Rio Verde: 28 km. to the south
- Nova Gloria: 24 km. to the east

Neighboring municipalities are:

- north: Nova América and Itapuranga
- south: Morro Agudo de Goiás and São Patrício
- east: Ceres
- west: Araguapaz
- Access from Goiânia: GO-080 / Nerópolis / São Francisco de Goiás / BR-153 / Jaraguá / Rianápolis / Rialma / GO-434 / Nova Glória. See Seplan for all the distances.

It is a municipality that was planned by the government and is one of the few settlements in the state that was already declared a city in the beginning of its existence. A curious fact is that the streets of the town have names of fruit trees. The climate is mild with an average temperature of 25 °C. The most important rivers are the São Patrício and the Rio Novo.

The municipality included the municipal seat together with the district of Waldelândia, the "povoado" of Cruzeiro, and the "aglomerados" of Bragolândia, Goiataba and Santa Luzia

== The Economy ==
Cattle raising is important with a big production of milk and dairy products. There were 768 farms in 2006 with a total area of 49,428 hectares. Pasture land occupied 36,000 hectares. The size of the cattle herd was 75,000 in 2007. There are plantations of rice, beans, manioc, sugarcane (6,800 ha. and a production of 476,000 tons in 2007), and corn.

There are several brickworks and lumber mills. The number of small furniture factories give the town the name "furniture capital" of the state. There is also a large distillery producing alcohol for fuel from the abundant sugarcane plantations. There were 03 bank branches in 2007: Banco do Brasil S.A., BRADESCO S.A., and Banco Itaú S.A.

== History ==
Rubiataba began in 1949 when the government of Getúlio Vargas decided to create an agricultural center in the region. The place had a good climate, with abundance of water and fertile soils. The first idea was to plant coffee. The name, ""Rubiataba" is a hybrid of "rubia", from rubiacea, and "taba", which means village. Seventy square kilometres were set aside for the future town, which was the first rural planned town in the country. It became a municipality in 1953.

== Health and Education ==
In 2006 there were 26 schools and 2 hospitals with 57 beds.

- Literacy rate in 2000: 86.7
- Infant mortality rate in 2000: 25.48 deaths for every 1,000 live births
- Municipal Human Development Index: 0.748
- State ranking: 82 (out of 242 municipalities)
- National ranking: 1,947 (out of 5,507 municipalities)

== See also ==
- List of municipalities in Goiás
- Microregions of Goiás
