= Crixás, Brazil =

Crixás
- Municipality
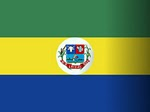
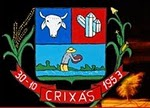
- Flag Coat of arms

- Location in Goiás state

- Location in Brazil
- Coordinates: 14°32′S 49°58′W
- Country: Brazil
- Region: Central-West
- State: Goiás
- Microregion: São Miguel do Araguaia Microregion

Area
  - Total: 4,661 km^{2} (1,800 sq mi)
- Elevation: 389 m (1,276 ft)

Population (2020)
  - Total: 17,044
  - Density: 3.657/km^{2} (9.471/sq mi)
- Time zone: UTC−3 (BRT)
- Postal code: 76510-000

Crixás is a municipality in northwestern Goiás state, Brazil. The population was 17,044 (2020) in a total area of 4,661.5 km^{2}. Crixás was a major gold producing area but is now gradually losing population.

Crixás is 334 kilometers from the state capital, Goiânia, and is in the São Miguel do Araguaia Microregion. Connections from Goiânia are made by GO-080 / Nerópolis / São Francisco de Goiás / BR-153 / Jaraguá / Rialma / GO-336 / Itapaci / GO-154 / Pilar de Goiás / Santa Terezinha de Goiás / GO-347.

The population growth rate from 1996/2007 was -0.87.%. In 2007 the urban population was 11,516 and the rural population was 3,031.

The history of Crixás begins in the eighteenth century with the discovery of gold. The first explorer in these lands was Manoel Rodrigues Tomar, who arrived in 1726. At the time the region was inhabited by the Crixás Indians. The name of the city comes from these Indians. In 1740 the settlement became Arraial de Crixás. In 1935 it became Vila de Crixás, and in 1953 it became a city.

The economy is based on mineral mining and milk production. The municipality has a gold mine, the Serra Grande Gold Mine, partly owned and operated by AngloGold Ashanti, the third-largest gold mining company in the world, and the Kinross Gold Corporation. There is also production of manganese and talcum. In 2007 there were 9 industrial units and 104 retail units. There were three banks and one dairy.

- Farms: 1,055
- Total agricultural Area: 229,416 hectares
- Permanent Planted Area: 8,401 hectares
- Temporary Planted Area: 3,811 hectares
- Natural Pasture: 141,660 hectares
- Woodland and Forest: 72,267 hectares
- Workers related to the farm owner: 2,519
- Workers not related to the farm owner: 240 (IBGE)
- Cattle herd: 690,665 head (2006)--the largest in the state and one of the largest in the country
- Main crops: rice (350 hectares), banana (75 hectares), corn (500 hectares), and soybeans (500 hectares). (All data from IBGE 2006)

In education the area had 12 schools and 3,546 students. There is also a campus of the Universidade Estadual de Goiás, or UEG, with courses in Pedagogy, Letters, Geography, History, and Mathematics. There was one small hospital, with 32 beds, and 07 public health clinics.

- Literacy rate in 2000: 82.0%
- Infant mortality rate in 2000: 31.85 in 1,000 live births

The ranking on the 2000 Municipal Human Development Index was 0.717. On the Seplan Economic Development Index (2001) the ranking was 21 out of 246 municipalities (2001). See Seplan. On the Seplan Social Development Index (2000) the ranking was 133 out of 246 municipalities (2000) See Seplan

== See also ==
- List of municipalities in Goiás
