= Pilar de Goiás =

- Municipality
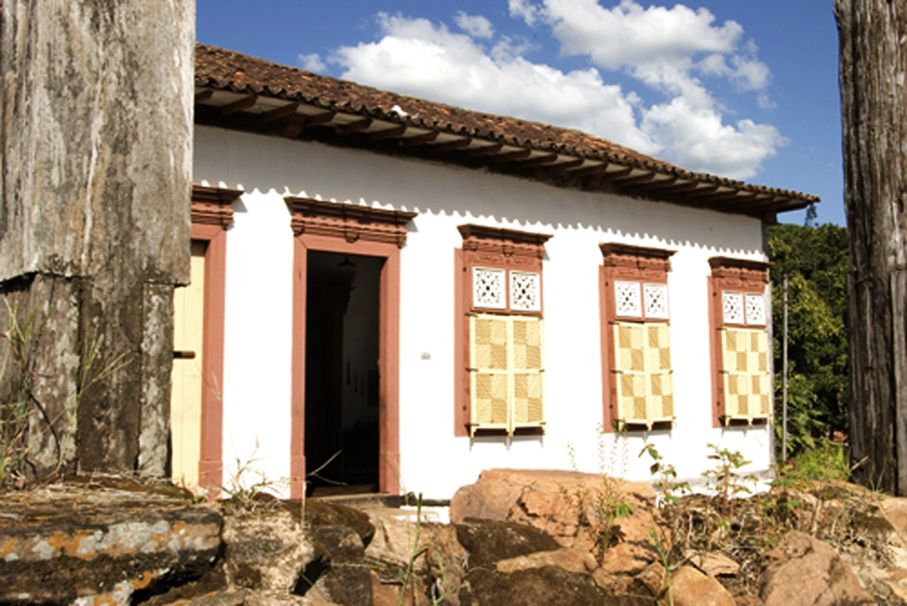

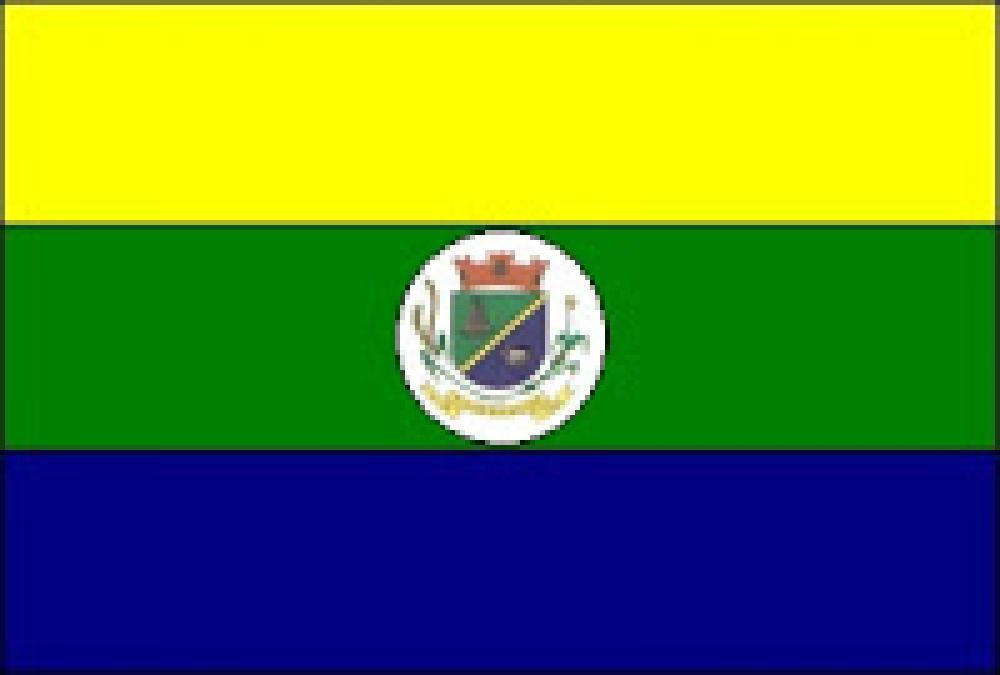
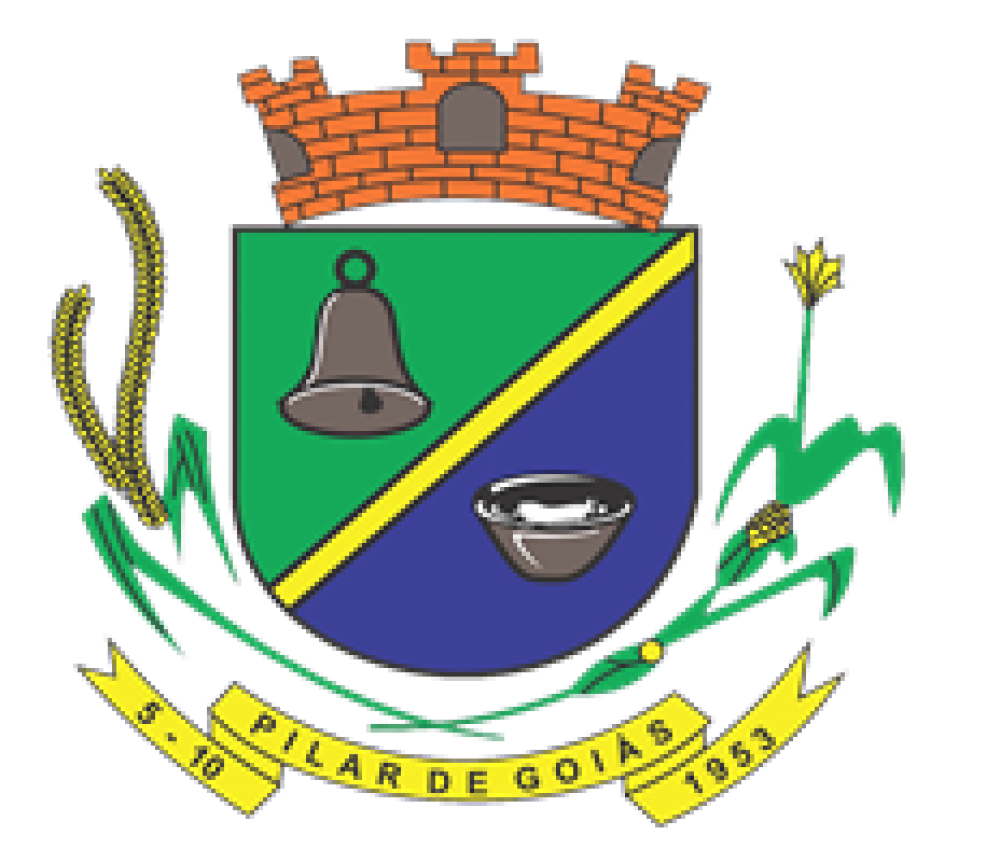
- Flag Coat of arms

- Location in Goiás state

- Location in Brazil
- Coordinates: 14°46′02″S 49°34′53″W
- Country: Brazil
- Region: Central-West
- State: Goiás

Area
  - Total: 907 km^{2} (350 sq mi)
- Elevation: 753 m (2,470 ft)

Population (2020)
  - Total: 2,194
  - Density: 2.42/km^{2} (6.27/sq mi)
- Time zone: UTC−3 (BRT)
- Postal code: 76370-000
- Website: www.rialma.go.gov.br

Pilar de Goiás is a municipality in north-central Goiás state, Brazil.

== Location ==
Pilar is located 252 kilometers north of the state capital, Goiânia in the Ceres Microregion. It is connected to the south of the state, with its main urban centers, by highway BR-153. Highway connections from Goiânia are made by GO-080 / Nerópolis / São Francisco de Goiás / BR-153 / Jaraguá / Rialma / GO-336 / Itapaci / GO-154.

Neighboring municipalities are:

- north: Santa Terezinha de Goiás and Nova Iguaçu de Goiás
- south: Itapaci
- east: Hidrolina
- west: Guarinos

The terrain is rugged and is crossed by the Vermelho, Peixe, and Taquaraçu rivers.

== Political and Demographic Information ==
In January 2005 the Mayor on record was Waltenir Soares Batista. There were 9 city council members and 2,408 eligible voters (December 2007).

In 2007 the population density was 3.15 inhabitants/km^{2}. The urban population was 1,121 (2007) and the rural population was 1,731. The population has decreased about 7,000 people since 1980, with most of the lost inhabitants leaving the rural zone.

== Economic, Educational, and Health Information ==
The economy is based on mining, agriculture, cattle raising, services, public administration, and small transformation industries. There were 13 commercial units in 2007 and no bank agencies. In 2007 there were 128 automobiles.

In 2006 there were 473 farms with a total area of 45,548 hectares, of which 1,136 hectares were farmland and 30,606 hectares were pasture. The cattle herd consisted of 62,000 head (2006)and the main crops were rice, bananas, beans, manioc and corn.

== Health and education ==
There were 14 primary schools in 2006 with 727 students. The adult literacy rate was 86.5% in 2000 with the national average being 86.4%.

There were no hospitals in 2005 and only 2 doctors. The infant mortality rate was 33.15 (2000) (national average was 33.0).

- Municipal Human Development Index: 0.700
- State ranking: 209 (out of 242 municipalities)
- National ranking: 2984 (out of 5507 municipalities)

== History ==
Pilar de Goiás is a Brazilian municipality in the state of Goiás. Situated in the region of the São Patrício Valley, its population according to IBGE Census in 2010 was 2,733 inhabitants. At the bottom of a valley, Pilar de Goiás was born in 1736 through the initiative of a redoubt of fugitive slaves who found in this place a shelter, and also a great source of gold. In order to recover these slaves, the bandeirante Joao de Godoy Pinto Silveira was entrusted with this task. Without knowing what he was going to find, the brave left in the middle of cerrado (local vegetation) searching for these slaves and when he found them, they have already dug the gold and offered this gold in exchange for freedom. At that moment, the large-scale settlement of the area that until then was called by the quilombolas of Quilombo de Papuã, name which means: marmalade grass (a very abundant plant at that time). With the beginning of the gold exploration many people came from several parts in the search for the gold ore, but in the region where it was more abundant lacked water and to dig it was more difficult. Then one of the garimpeiros made a promise to a saint: Saint Lady of Pilar, if sprout water in that region so that he could work, as a form of gratitude he would give a golden bell to the church that would be built in that village. The promise was answered and in that region sprout water. The garimpeiro paid his pledge and donated a golden bell to the church that because of the miracle was done in devotion to the saint who had attended to it. From there, the village of Papuã became known as Pilar de Goiás, to remind everyone that the saint helps those who turn to her. Pilar has as main tourist attractions the Feast of Saint Lady of Pilar and the Cavalhadas. In the city, there is one biggest bell, 900 kilos and in whose league has spent an arroba of gold.

== See also ==
- List of municipalities in Goiás
