= Nawaf Ghazaleh =

Syrian assassin (1927-2005)

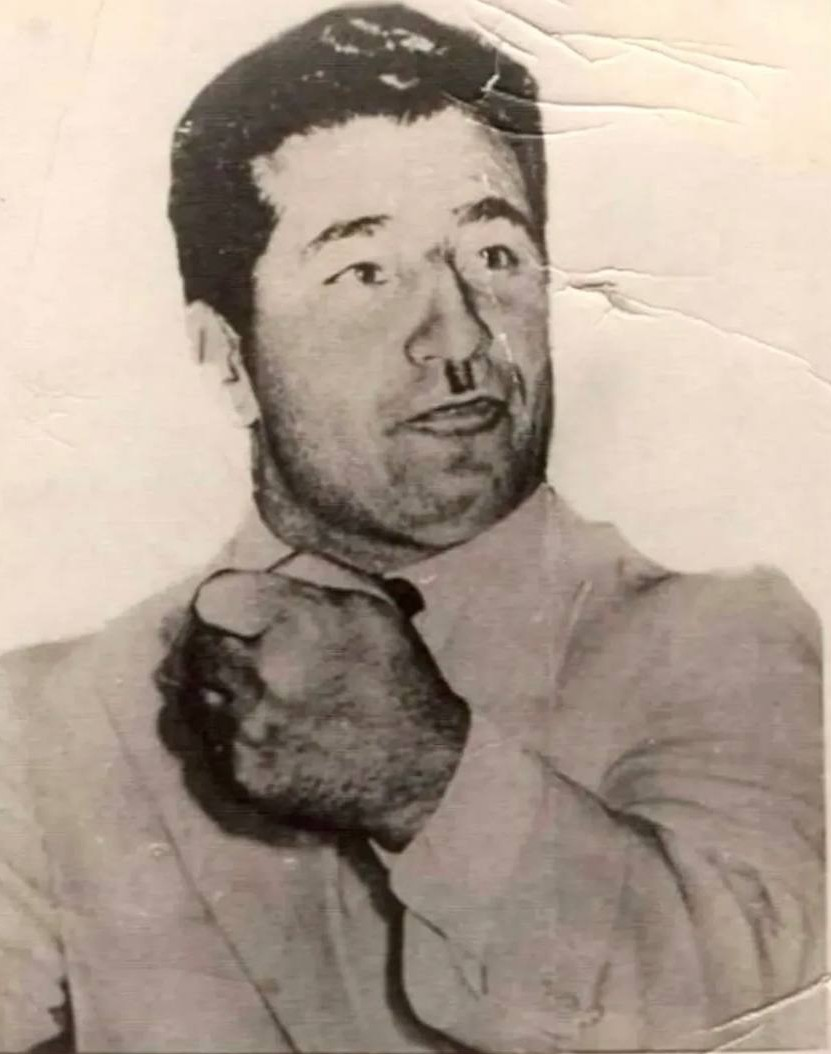
- Born: 1927; Al-Suwayda Governorate, Syria
- Died: 21 November 2005 (aged 78); Brazil
- Resting place: As-Suwayda
- Criminal charges: Murder of Adib Shishakli
- Criminal penalty: 5 years imprisonment

Nawaf Ghazaleh (Arabic: نواف غزالة; 1927 – November 21, 2005) was a Syrian Druze who assassinated the overthrown Syrian president Adib Shishakli.

== Assassination of Shishakli ==
The assassination occurred on 27 September 1964, in Brazil, where Shishkhali was in exile. Ghazaleh approached Shishkhali while he was crossing a bridge between the cities Ceres and Rialma, and exchanged a few words with him before shooting him five times with a pistol. It was revenge for Shishakli's military campaign in Jabal al-Druze. The Ghazaleh clan had experienced some of the largest casualties during the assault.

== Legacy ==
During a speech in 2006, Lebanese Progressive Socialist Party leader Walid Jumblatt called for the killing of Syrian president Bashar al-Assad by referring to Nawaf Ghazaleh: "A (Nawaf) must emerge one day - and if the international court proves futile, we are (Nawafs) and we are all Salma Seyour and we are all Jamal Saab. No matter how long it takes, one of us will emerge and take revenge for all the martyrs, starting from Kamal Jumblatt to Pierre Gemayel, who I hope is the last."
