= Nova Glória =

- Municipality
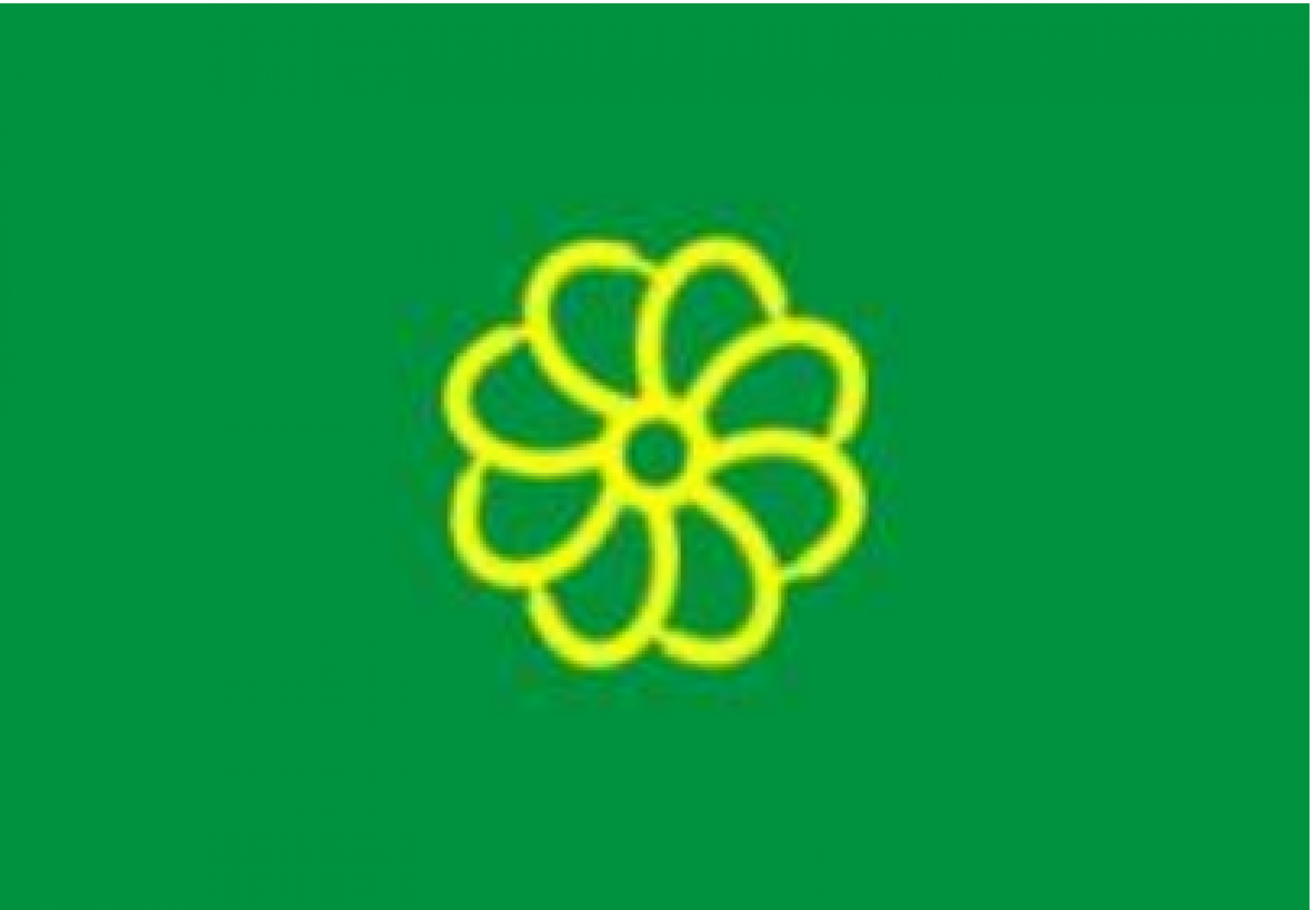
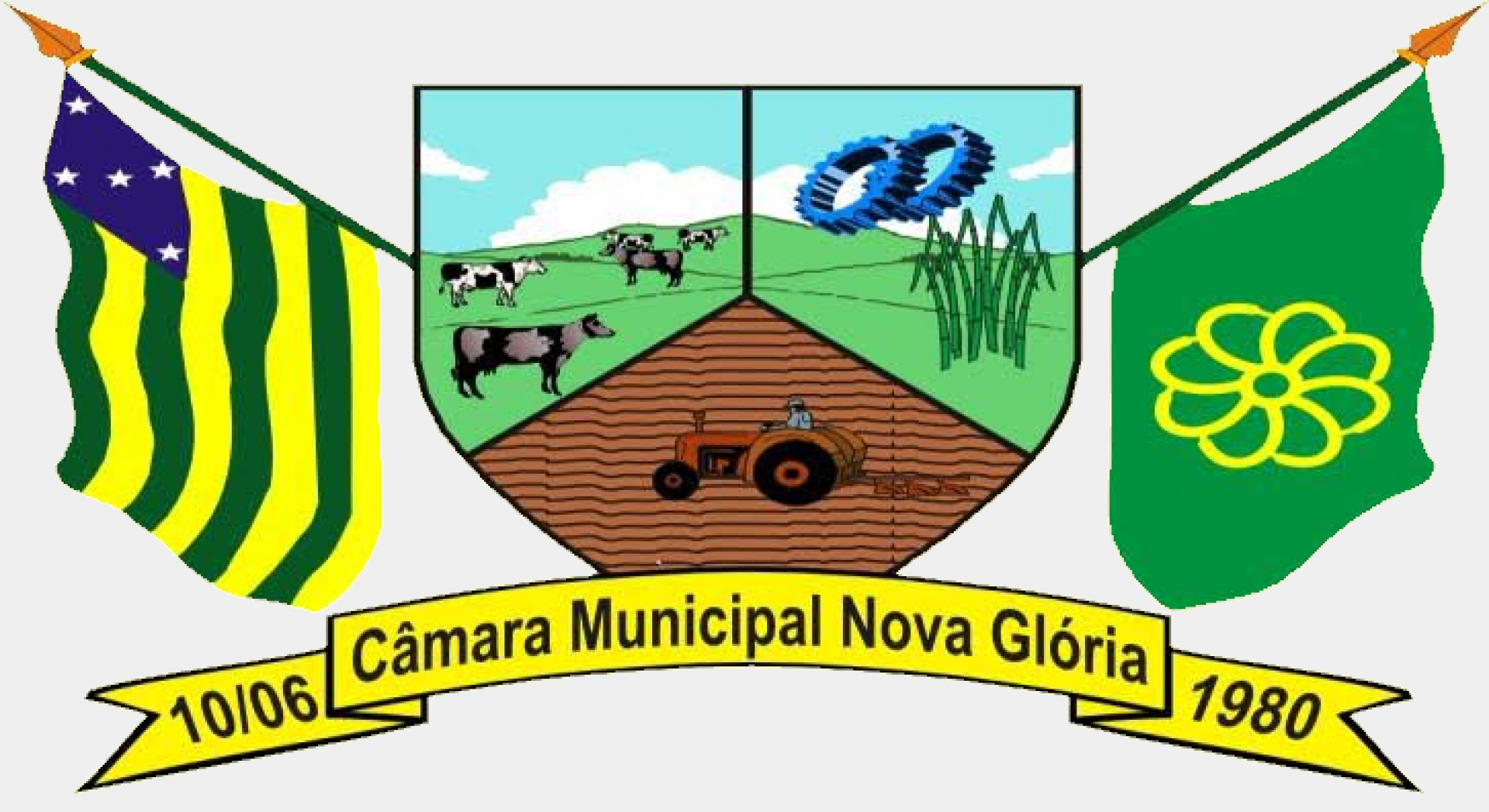
- Flag Coat of arms

- Location in Goiás state

- Location in Brazil
- Coordinates: 15°09′02″S 49°34′23″W
- Country: Brazil
- Region: Central-West
- State: Goiás
- Microregion: Ceres

Area
  - Total: 413 km^{2} (159 sq mi)
- Elevation: 562 m (1,844 ft)

Population (2020)
  - Total: 8,112
  - Density: 19.6/km^{2} (50.9/sq mi)
- Time zone: UTC−3 (BRT)
- Postal code: 76305-000
- Website: www.novagloria.go.gov.br

Nova Glória is a municipality in north-central Goiás state, Brazil. It is a large producer of sugarcane.

== Location ==
Nova Glória is in the Ceres Microregion and is north of Goiânia, just east of the important BR-153 highway. It is 21 kilometers north of the important commercial center, Ceres. Nearby towns are Itapaci, 25 km to the north; Rubiataba, 24 km. to the west; and Rialma, 21 km. to the south. The important BR 153 highway is 3 km. to the east.

The distance to Goiânia is 206 km. Highway connections are made by GO-080 / Nerópolis / São Francisco de Goiás / BR-153 / Jaraguá / Rialma / GO-434. See Seplan

Municipal boundaries are with:

- north: Itapaci and São Luíz do Norte
- south: Ceres, Rialma and Santa Isabel
- east: Ceres
- west: Santa Isabel

== Political Information ==
In January 2005 the Mayor was Carlos Luiz de Oliveira. There were 9 city-council members and 7,060 eligible voters in 2007.

== Demographic Information ==
In 2007 the population density was 20.51 inhabitants/km^{2}. There were 5,482 inhabitants in the urban area and 2,988 in the rural area. The population has increased by about 700 inhabitants since 1991.

== Economic Information ==
The economy was based on agriculture, cattle raising, services, public administration and modest transformation industries. In 2007 there were 12 industrial installations and 86 retail units. There was one financial institution: BRADESCO S.A. Transformation industries were the largest employers with 262 workers, followed by commerce with 219. In 2007 there were 613 automobiles.

In 2006 there were 463 farms with a total area of 25.192 hectares, of which 6,600 hectares were farmland and 17,200 hectares were pasture. In 2004 there were 39,000 head of cattle, 20,000 head of poultry, and 2,400 head of swine. The main agricultural products were pineapple, peanuts, rice, sugarcane (4,900 hectares), beans, manioc, watermelon, corn, and tomatoes.

== Health and education ==
In 2007 there was 1 hospital, with 70 beds, and 4 walk-in health clinics. In 2000 the infant mortality rate was 25.06, below the national average of 33.0.

In 2005 the school system had 16 schools, 80 classrooms, 129 teachers, and 2,226 students. In 2000 the adult literacy rate was 83.0%, lower than the national average of 86.4%.

Ranking on the Municipal Human Development Index

- MHDI: 0.724
- State ranking: 161 (out of 242 municipalities)
- National ranking: 2,532 (out of 5,507 municipalities)

For the complete list see frigoletto.com.br

== See also ==
  - List of municipalities in Goiás
- Microregions of Goiás
