= Microregion of Ceres =

Coordinates: 15°18′28″S 49°35′52″W

Ceres
- Microregion
- Location in Goias state
- Country: Brazil
- State: Goiás
- Mesoregion: Centro Goiano
- Municipalities: 22

Area
  - Total: 13,224.40 km^{2} (5,105.97 sq mi)

Population (2007)
  - Total: 215,820
  - Density: 16/km^{2} (42/sq mi)

The Ceres Microregion is located in north-central Goiás state, Brazil. It includes 22 cities with a total population of 215,820 inhabitants (2007). The total area is 13,224.40 km^{2}. The most important cities are Ceres and Goianésia.

The most populous municipality is Goianésia with 53,806 inhabitants. The least populous is São Patrício with 2,051 inhabitants.

The largest municipality in land area is Goianésia with 1,419.0 km^{2}. The smallest is São Patrício with 135.0 km^{2}.

== Municipalities ==
The microregion consists of the following municipalities:

- Barro Alto 6,446
- Carmo do Rio Verde 8,897
- Ceres 18,637
- Goianésia 53,806
- Guaraíta 2,394
- Guarinos 2,411
- Hidrolina 4,157
- Ipiranga de Goiás 2,813
- Itapaci 16,003
- Itapuranga 24,832
- Morro Agudo de Goiás 2,339
- Nova América 2,200
- Nova Glória 8,470
- Pilar de Goiás 2,852
- Rialma 10,485
- Rianápolis 4,167
- Rubiataba 18,025
- Santa Isabel 3,485
- Santa Rita do Novo Destino 3,372
- São Luís do Norte 4,266
- São Patrício 2,051
- Uruana 13,712

Population is from 2007.

== See also ==
- List of municipalities in Goiás
- Microregions of Goiás
