= Rianápolis =

- Municipality
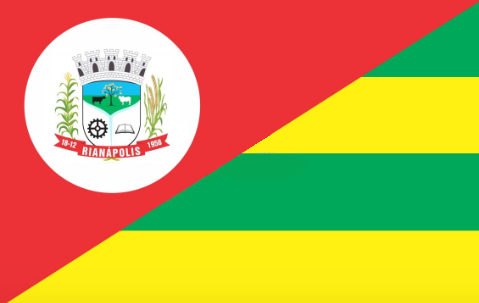
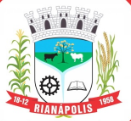
- Flag Coat of arms

- Location in Goiás state

- Location in Brazil
- Coordinates: 15°26′44″S 49°30′25″W
- Country: Brazil
- Region: Central-West
- State: Goiás
- Microregion: Ceres Microregion

Area
  - Total: 159.3 km^{2} (61.5 sq mi)
- Elevation: 589 m (1,932 ft)

Population (2020)
  - Total: 4,817
  - Density: 30.24/km^{2} (78.32/sq mi)
- Time zone: UTC−3 (BRT)
- Postal code: 76310-000

Rianápolis is a municipality in northeastern Goiás state, Brazil.

== Location ==
It is located almost directly north of the state capital of Brazil, and is on the important BR-153 highway, which links Belém to São Paulo. The regional center of Ceres is located 19 km. to the northwest. Highway connections from Goiânia are made by taking BR-153 from Anápolis to Rianápolis. From Goiânia take GO-080 / Nerópolis / São Francisco de Goiás / BR-153 / Jaraguá. Rianápolis is 43 km. north of Jaraguá. See Seplan

- Neighboring municipalities: Rialma, Santa Rita do Novo Destino, Jaraguá, and Uruana

== Demographics ==
- Urban population: 3,657
- Population density: 26.15 inhabitants/km^{2} (2007)
- Population growth: -0.61% 1996/2007

== The Economy ==
Economic activity is based on agriculture, cattle raising, services, small transformation industries, and government employment. There were 135 farms in 2006 with a total of 4,724 hectares. Pasture land made up 90 percent of the total. The cattle herd had 15,000 head in 2006 while the main agricultural crops were rice, sugarcane, beans, manioc, corn, and soybeans.

== Health and Education ==
There were 4 schools in 2006. The adult literacy rate was 83.7% (2000) (the national average was 86.4%). There was 1 hospital with 43 beds. The infant mortality rate was 17.5 (2000) (the national average was 33.0).

Municicipal Human Development Index: 0.759 For the complete list see frigoletto.com.br

== History ==
The settlement began in the early 1940s along the road linking Jaraguá to the Colônia Nacional Agrícola de Goiás, present-day Ceres near an airstrip. The first houses served as a resting place for travelers between the two towns. Soon there was a store and a small hotel. The settlement was first called "Campo de Aviação", after the landing strip. In 1958 it became a municipality taking the name of Rianápols, because of its location between the towns of Rialma and Anápolis

== See also ==
- List of municipalities in Goiás
