= Carmo do Rio Verde =

- Municipality
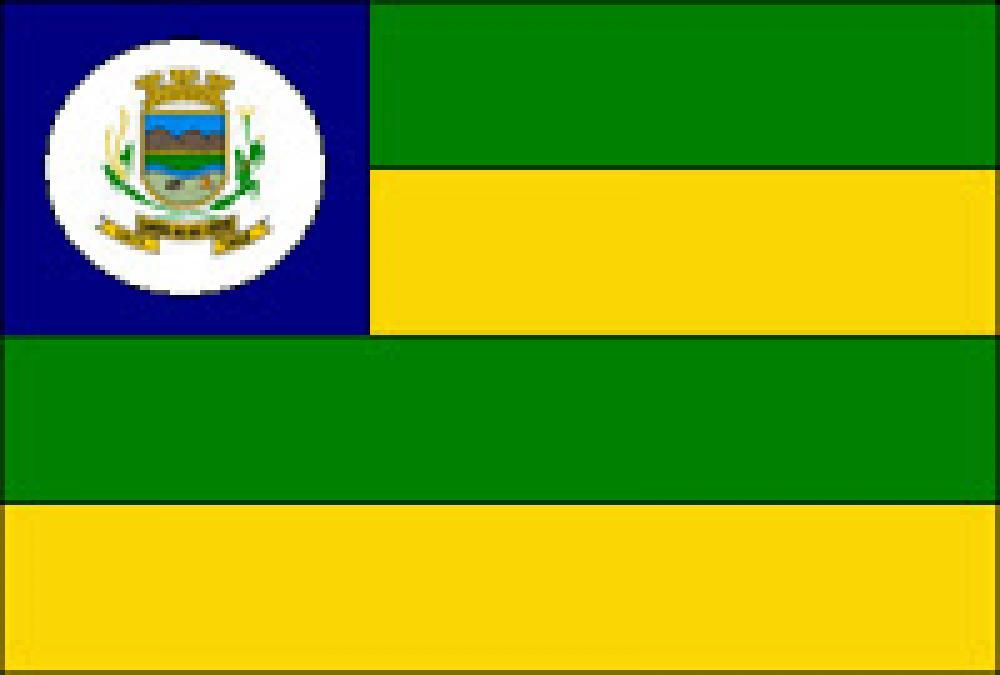
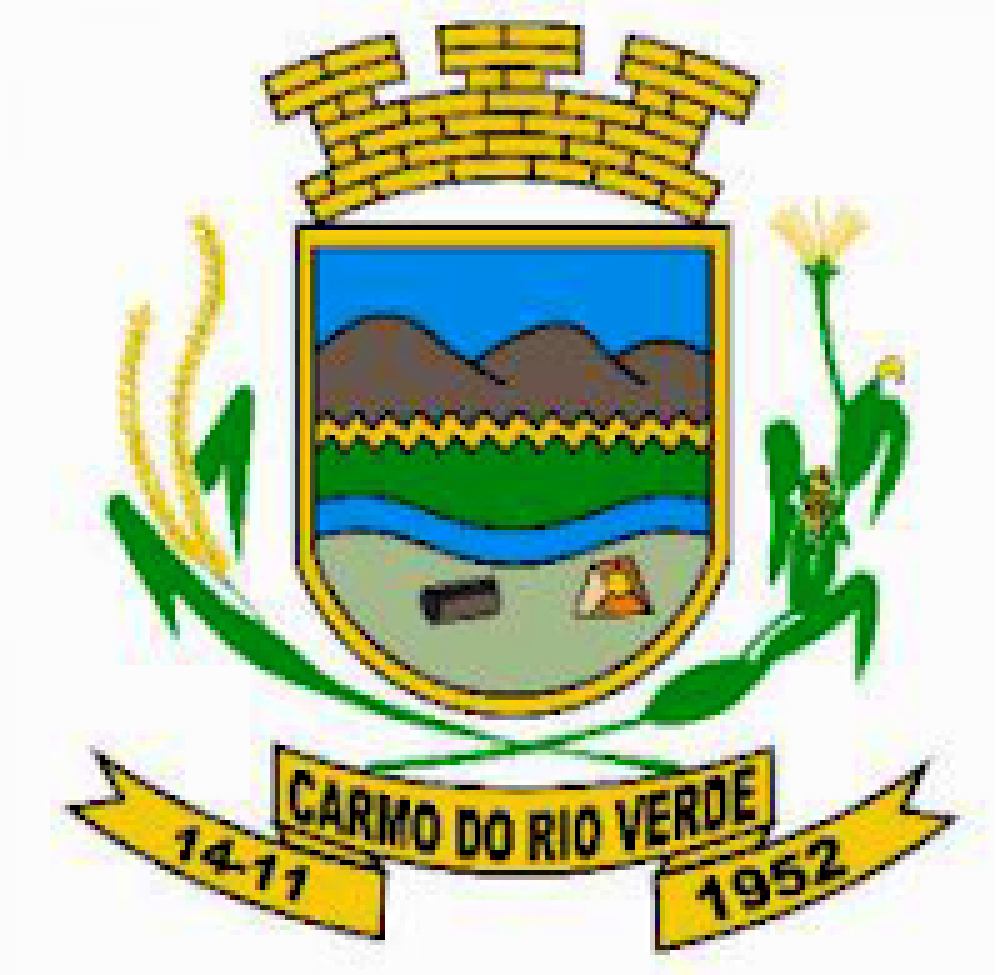
- Flag Coat of arms

- Location in Goiás state

- Location in Brazil
- Coordinates: 15°21′25″S 49°42′21″W
- Country: Brazil
- Region: Central-West
- State: Goiás

Area
  - Total: 456 km^{2} (176 sq mi)
- Elevation: 629 m (2,064 ft)

Population (2020)
  - Total: 10,186
  - Density: 22.3/km^{2} (57.9/sq mi)
- Time zone: UTC−3 (BRT)
- Postal code: 76340-000

Carmo do Rio Verde is a municipality in central Goiás state, Brazil. The population was 8,897 (2007) in a total area of 457.5 km^{2}. Carmo do Rio Verde is a major producer of sugar cane for production of alcohol.

== Location ==
The city is located 176 km. northwest of the capital, Goiânia, 22 kilometers west of Ceres, the most important city in the Ceres Microregion. Highway connections to Goiânia are made by GO-070 / Goianira / Inhumas / Itauçu / GO-154 / Taquaral de Goiás / Itaguaru / Uruana. See Highway Distances for the complete list.

There are municipal boundaries with:

- north: Ceres
- west: São Patrício and Itapuranga
- east: Rialma
- south: Itapuranga and São Patrício

== Demographics ==
- Population density: 19.51 inhabitants/km^{2} in 2007.
- Population in 1980: 10,233
- Population in 2007: 8,897
- Urban population: 6,777
- Population growth rate: -0.56.% 1996/2007

== History ==
The town began in 1939 with the foundation of the Colonia Nacional de Goiás, a project to settle the area. On the banks of the Rio Verde lived the Pinto family had set up a store to cater to the engineers and surveyors. In 1945 a chapel was built to Nossa Senora do Carmo and the settlement became known as "Carmo do Rio Verde". In 1948 it was raised to district in the municipality of Goiás, and in 1952 it was dismembered to become a municipality.

== The economy ==
The economy is based on cattle raising, sugar cane for alcohol production, and dairy products. There was a distillery, two dairies, and two banks in 2007. There were 553 farms (2006) with 313 hectares of permanent crops and 8,021 hectares of perennial crops. There were 19,471 hectares of pasture land producing 37,000 head of cattle, mainly for the meat market. Sugar cane was the most important crop with 5,450 hectares planted and a production of 408,000 tons in 2007. Other crops were watermelon, corn, rice, manioc, tomatoes, and passion fruit.

== Health and education ==
In 2007 there was one hospital with 18 beds and 03 public health clinics (SUS). In the school system in 2006 there were 07 schools.

- Infant mortality rate in 2000: 23.97
- Literacy rate in 2000: 84.1
- Ranking on the Municipal Human Development Index: 0.728 (2000)

For the complete list see frigoletto.com.br

== Temperatures ==
→ Winter temperatures: low: 12 °C/high: 31 °C;

→ Spring temperatures: low: 19 °C/high: 35 °C;

→ Summer temperatures: low: 21 °C/high: 29 °C;

→ Autumn temperatures: low: 16 °C/high: 29 °C.
