= Ceres, Goiás =

Ceres
- Municipality
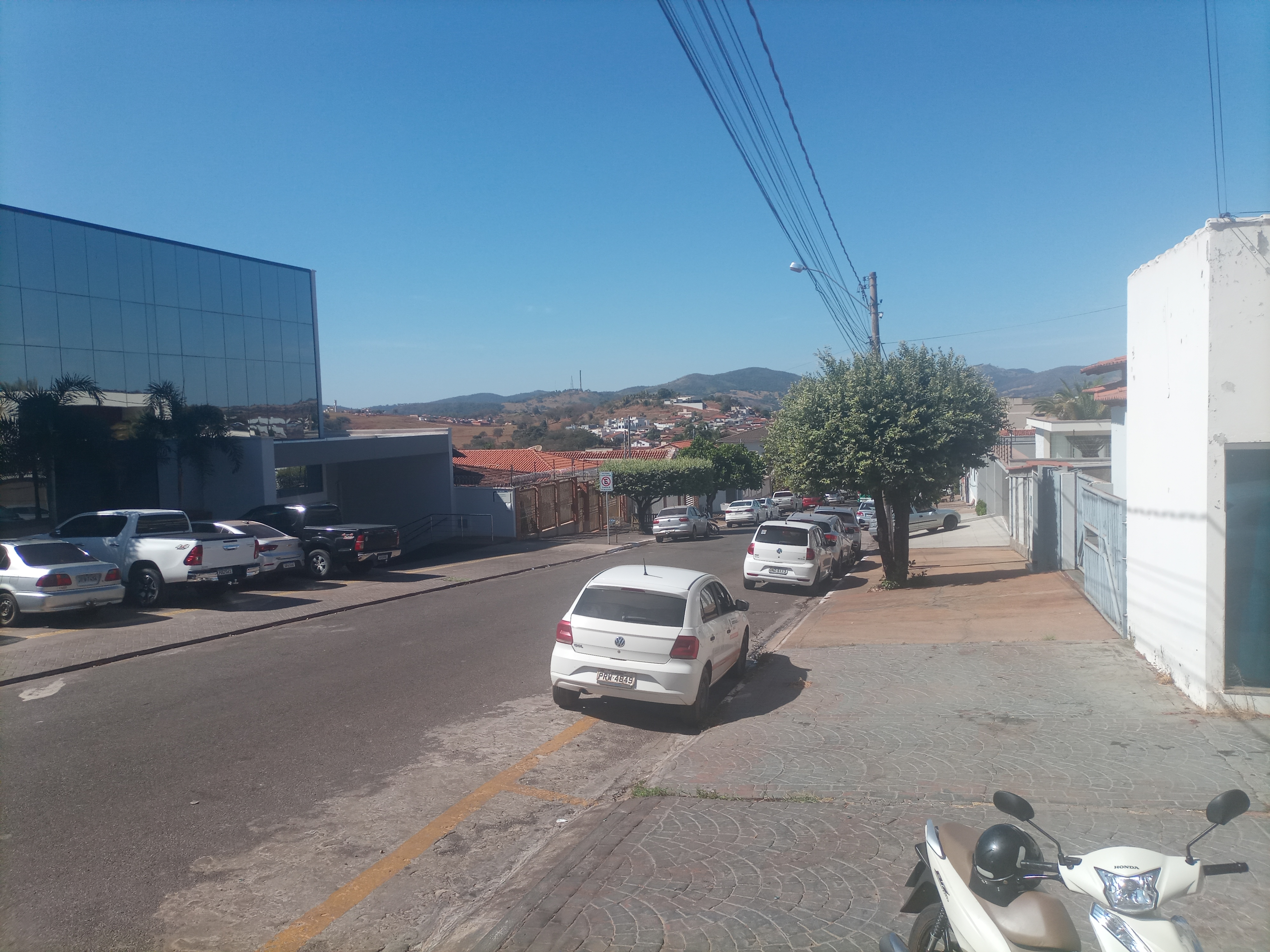

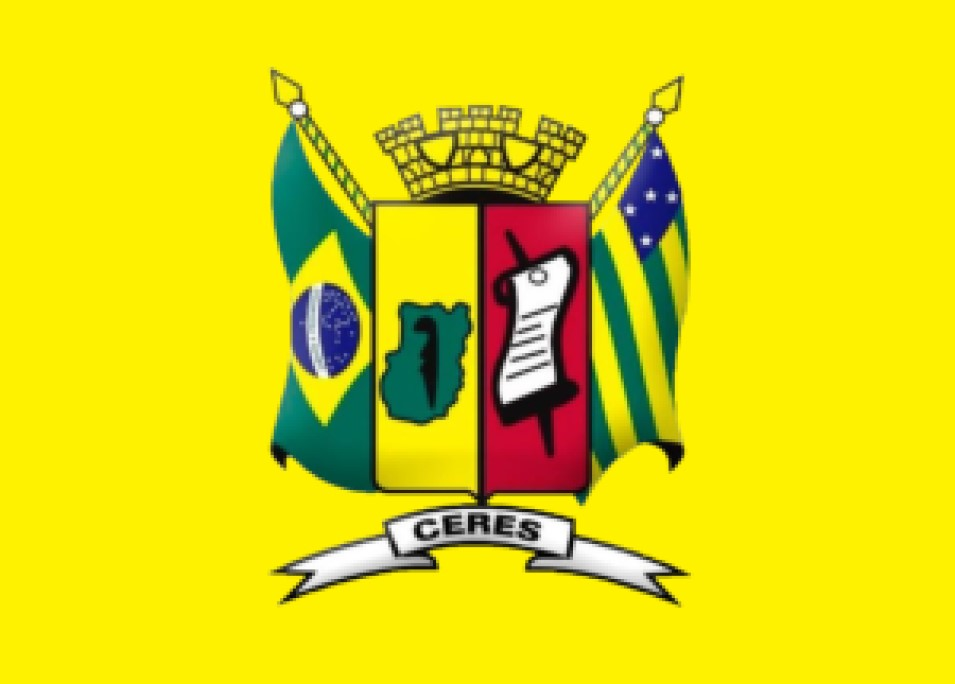
- Flag

- Location in Goiás state

- Location in Brazil
- Coordinates: 15°18′12″S 49°36′19″W
- Country: Brazil
- Region: Central-West
- State: Goiás
- Microregion: Ceres Microregion

Area
  - Total: 456.6 km^{2} (176.3 sq mi)
- Elevation: 571 m (1,873 ft)

Population (2020)
  - Total: 22,306
  - Density: 48.85/km^{2} (126.5/sq mi)
- Time zone: UTC−3 (BRT)
- Postal code: 76300-000
- Website: www.ceres.go.gov.br

Ceres is a municipality in Goiás (Portuguese pronunciation: [ɡojˈjas]) state, Brazil. Located atop the Brazilian Highlands, it was one of the first agricultural colonies built in the state of Goiás.

== Geography ==
Ceres is 187 km. from the state capital, Goiânia. Municipal boundaries are with Itapaci, Nova Glória, São Patrício, Carmo do Rio Verde, Rialma and Rubiataba. Highway links are made by GO-080 / Nerópolis / Petrolina de Goiás / BR-153 / Jaraguá / Rianápolis / Rialma. See Sepin

The city is located in the fertile São Patrício valley and is rich in water courses. The Rio das Almas is the main river in the region and separates Ceres from its neighbor, Rialma. The Rio das Almas flows north to join the Maranhão, a tributary of the Tocantins. The average annual temperature is 26 °C and the annual rainfall is approximately 1,800 mm^{3}.

== Temperatures ==
→ Winter temperatures: low: 12 °C/high: 32 °C;

→ Spring temperatures: low: 19 °C/high: 36 °C;

→ Summer temperatures: low: 21 °C/high: 29 °C;

→ Autumn temperatures: low: 15 °C/high: 29 °C.

== Demographic and political data ==
The population dropped dramatically from 1980 to 2007 (31,400 to 18,600) and now appears to be stabilizing. Most of the population lives in the urban area of Ceres while the rural area has been losing population at a rapid pace.

== Economy ==
Agriculture used to be the mainstay of the local economy and the city once had about 70 thousand inhabitants. In recent years Ceres has been transformed from an agricultural town into a service center. The town is noted for its health and education. There are small industries specializing in furniture, wooden carts, wheat flour, sawed wood, bricks, coffee toasting, cereals, and milk products. In 2007 there were four banks.

In 2006 there were 273 farms with a total area of 17,627 hectares, of which 4,700 hectares were cropland. There were 24,000 head of cattle in 2006. The main crops in planted area were rice, corn, sugarcane, and tomatoes. See IBGE

== Health and Education Data ==
There were 8 hospitals with 302 beds in 2007 and 23 public health walk-in clinics. The literacy rate in 2000 was 89.4%. There were 23 schools with 7,084 students in 2006. There were three campuses of institutes of higher education: Faculdade de Filosofia do Vale do São Patrício. - UEG - Faculdade de Ciências Agrárias do Vale do São Patrício - Faculdades Integradas da Associação Educativa Evangélica (extension)

- MHDI (2000): 0.782
- State ranking: 28 (out of 242 municipalities in 2000)
- National ranking: 1,019 (out of 5,507 municipalities)For the complete list see frigoletto.com.br

== History ==
Ceres began in 1941 when the Getulio Vargas government created an agricultural colony called Colônia Agrícola Nacional de Goiás – CANG established on the banks of the left bank of the Rio Almas. 26-32-hectare lots were distributed along with seeds and tools, while free medical and dental care was promised to the new settlers. Each area had to preserve 25% of the land in forest. A house was given to each settler. The head of this project was an engineer named Bernardo Sayão, one of the pioneers of modern Goiás. The city of Ceres has its origin in this colony, which at the time attracted migrants from all over the country, attracted by the offers of free land in a fertile valley. In 1947 there were already 10,000 inhabitants. In 1943 Ceres was a district in the municipality of Goiás, separating in 1953 to become a municipality. Adib Shishakli, Syria's ex-president, was assassinated in his exile in Ceres by a Syrian Druze, Nawaf Ghazaleh.
