= Rialma =

- Municipality
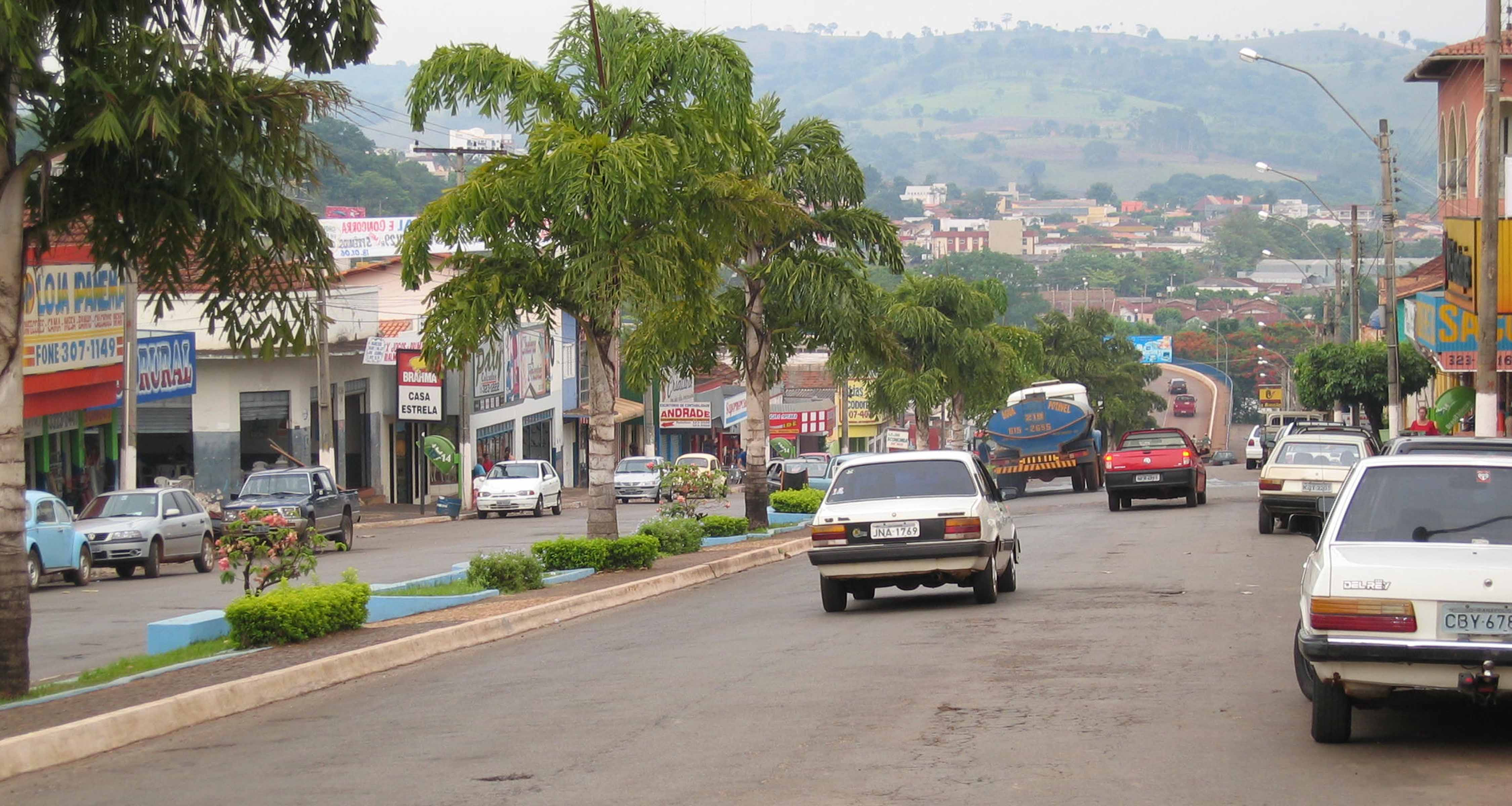

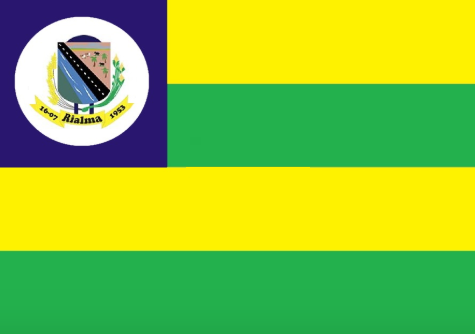
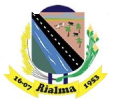
- Flag Coat of arms

- Location in Goiás state

- Location in Brazil
- Coordinates: 16°00′30″S 49°47′46″W
- Country: Brazil
- Region: Central-West
- State: Goiás
- Microregion: Ceres

Area
  - Total: 268.9 km^{2} (103.8 sq mi)
- Elevation: 582 m (1,909 ft)

Population (2020)
  - Total: 10,940
  - Density: 40.68/km^{2} (105.4/sq mi)
- Time zone: UTC−3 (BRT)
- Postal code: 76310-000
- Website: www.rialma.go.gov.br

Rialma is a municipality in north-central Goiás state, Brazil.

== Location and geography ==
Rialma is located across the Rio das Almas from Ceres on the important interstate highway BR-153, which links Anápolis to Belém. It was created as part of the urban area of Ceres, which was also created as the Colônia Nacional Agrícola de Goiás. It is part of the Ceres Microregion.

The distance to Goiânia is 182 km. Highway connections are made by GO-080 / Nerópolis / São Francisco de Goiás / BR-153 / Jaraguá / Rianápolis. Rialma is 19 km north of Rianápolis.

The municipality has boundaries with Nova Glória in the north; Santa Isabel, Goiás in the east; Rianápolis and Uruana in the south; Carmo do Rio Verde in the southeast; and Ceres in the west.

The climate is moist tropical. The most important river is the Rio das Almas, which has its source near Cocalzinho de Goiás and flows north to enter the massive Serra da Mesa reservoir, which dams up the Maranhão River.

== Political information and demographics ==
In January 2005 the mayor was Evaldo José da Silva and there were nine members on the city council. The number of eligible voters was 7,896 in 2007.

The population density was 38.98 inhabitants/km^{2} (2007) with 9,292 living in urban areas and 1,193 living in rural areas. There has been a gain in population of about 3,500 people since 1980.

== Economy ==
Economic activity is based on agriculture, cattle raising, services, small transformation industries, and government employment. There is also a sizable herd of beef and dairy cattle (23,000 head in 2006). There was one bank branch in 2007.

There were 234 farms in 2006 with a total area of 23,154 hectares. Around 9,000 hectares were planted and 11,000 were pasture land. The main agricultural crops were rice, sugarcane, beans, oranges, manioc, corn, and soybeans.

== Health and education ==
There was a campus of the Federal University of Goiás in 2007. The adult literacy rate was 89.3% in 2000, with the national average being 86.4%. In 2007 there was 01 hospital with 29 beds. The infant mortality rate was 25.4 (2000), with the national average being 33.0.

- Municipal Human Development Index: 0.777
- State ranking: 35 (out of 242 municipalities)
- National ranking: 1,124 (out of 5,507 municipalities)

== Etymology ==
The name of the city came from an agglutination of Rio das Almas. In 1953, when the BR-153 was built, Rialma broke off from Jaraguá to become a separate municipality.

== See also ==
- List of municipalities in Goiás
- Microregions of Goiás
