= São Francisco de Goiás =

- Municipality
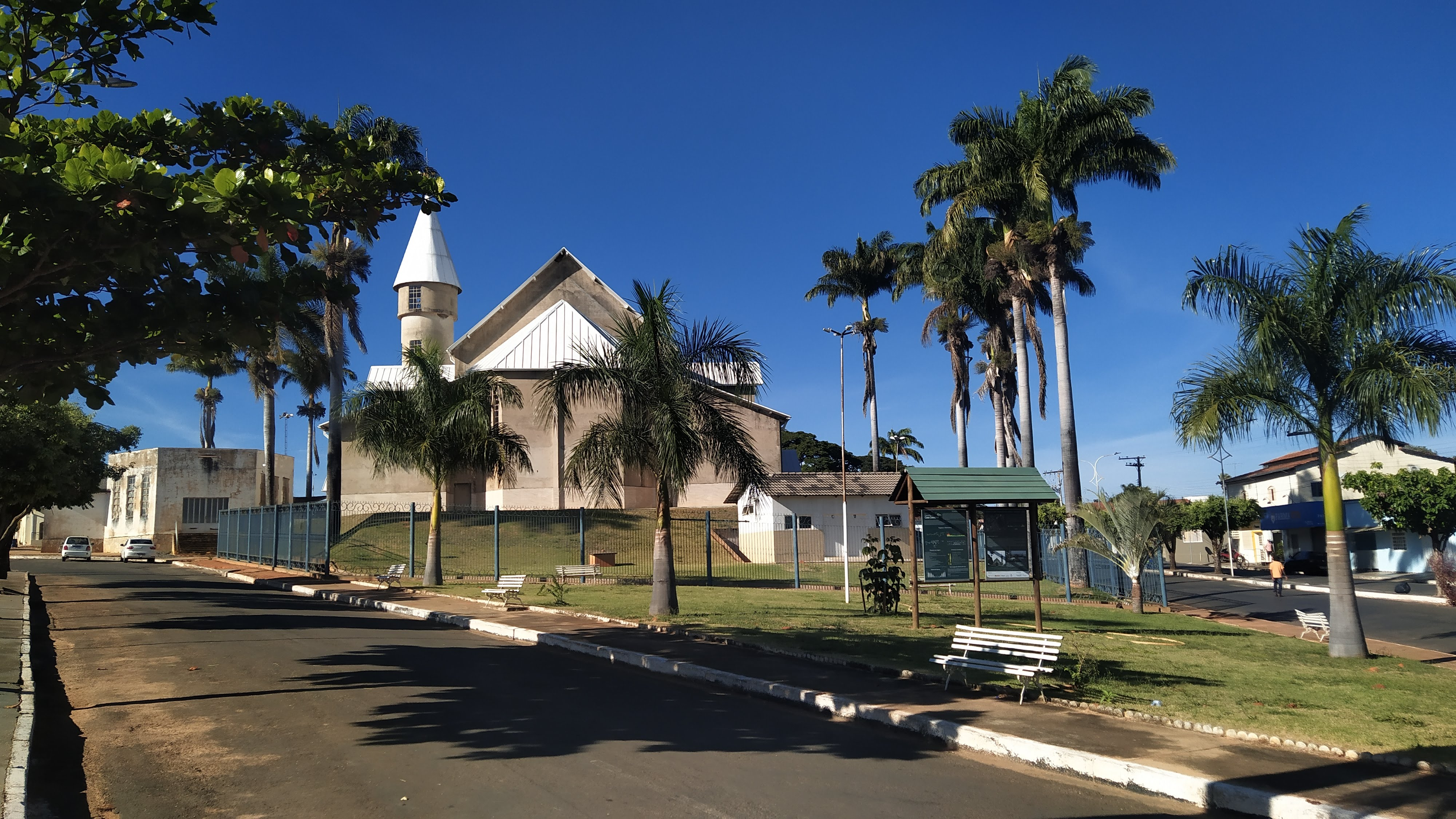

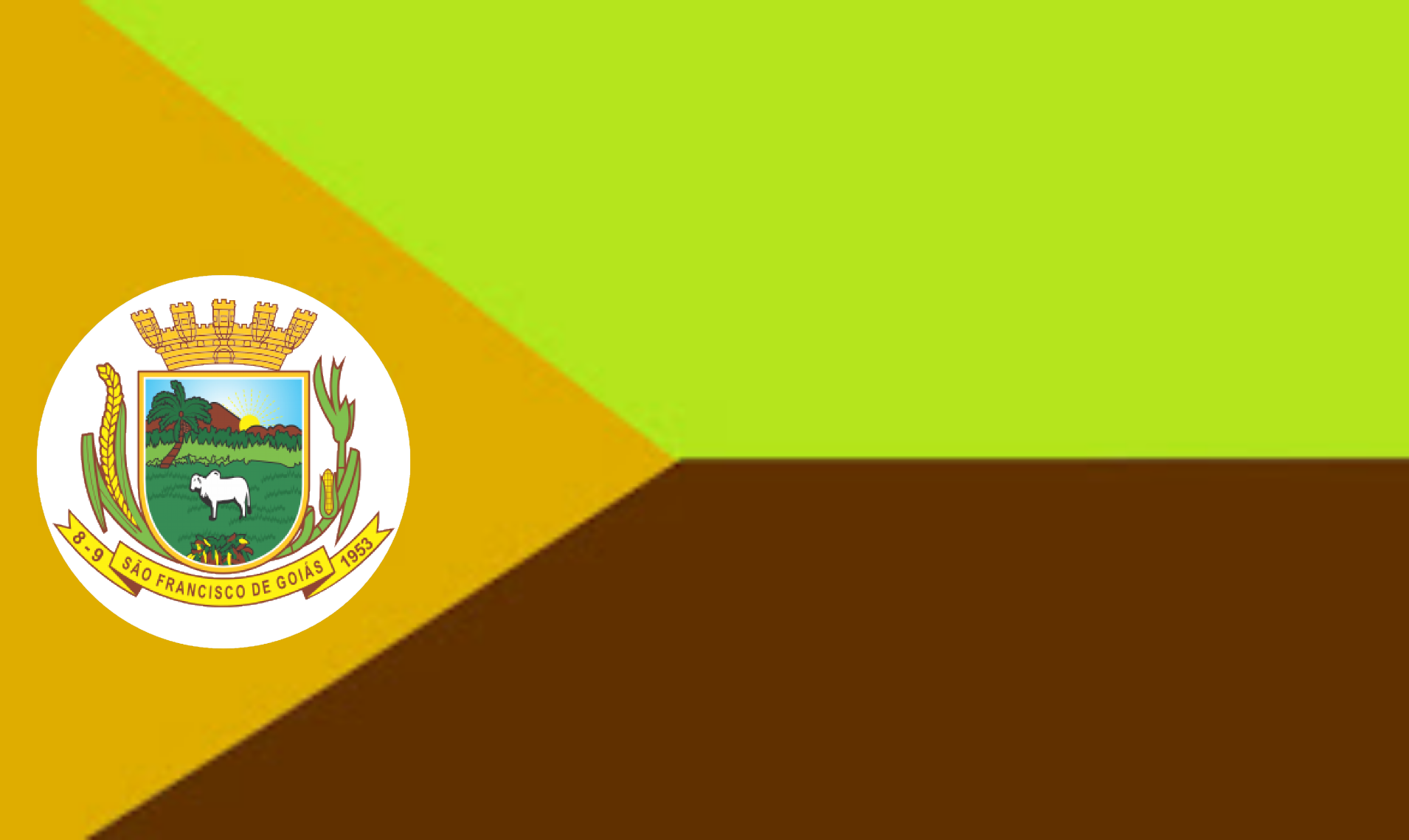
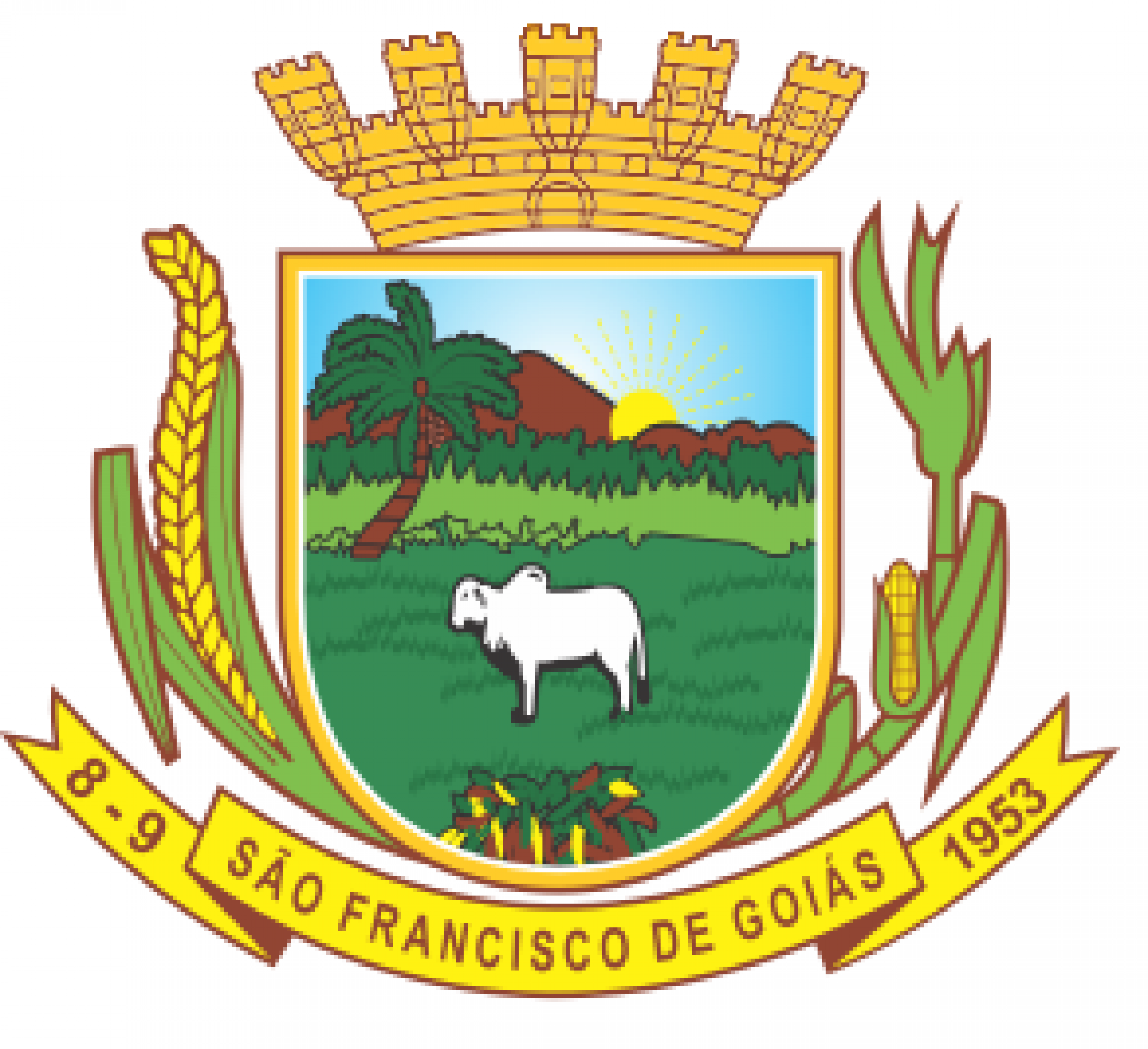
- Flag Coat of arms

- Location in Goiás state

- Location in Brazil
- Coordinates: 15°56′08″S 49°15′47″W
- Country: Brazil
- Region: Central-West
- State: Goiás
- Microregion: Anápolis Microregion

Area
  - Total: 339.3 km^{2} (131.0 sq mi)
- Elevation: 747 m (2,451 ft)

Population (2020)
  - Total: 6,267
  - Density: 18.47/km^{2} (47.84/sq mi)
- Time zone: UTC−3 (BRT)
- Postal code: 75490-000

São Francisco de Goiás is a municipality in central Goiás state, Brazil.

Municipal boundaries:

- North: Jaraguá
- South: Petrolina de Goiás
- East: Pirenópolis
- West: Jesúpolis and Jaraguá

Connections from Goiânia are made by GO-080 / Nerópolis / Petrolina de Goiás. Federal highway BR-153 is 4 kilometers east of the town.

The main rivers that cross the municipality are Rio Pari, Lagoinha, das Almas, and Padre Souza. The climate is classified as tropical, hot and semi-moist. The average temperature in the coldest months is 18 °C and 23 °C to 30 °C in the hottest months. Most of the rain falls between December and March.

== History ==
The site of the town was first inhabited by Europeans in 1740 by gold diggers looking for gold in the rivers. In 1911 the town was part of Jaraguá becoming a separate municipality in 1953.

== Demographics ==
- Population density: 16.83 inhabitants/km^{2} (2007)
- Total population in 2007: 5,713
- Total population in 1980: 9,427
- Population growth rate: -0.31% for 1996/2007
- Urban population: 4,189
- Rural population: 1,524

== Economy ==
The economy is based on subsistence agriculture, cattle raising, services, public administration, and small transformation industries.

- Number of industrial establishments: 29
- Number of retail establishments: 44
- Banking establishments: Banco Itaú S.A.
- Automobiles: 385

The cattle herd had 39,000 head in 2006 while the main crops cultivated were pineapple, rice (90 ha.), bananas, beans, manioc (200 ha.), corn (350 ha.), tomatoes, and soybeans (150 ha.)

=== Agriculture ===
- Number of Farms: 605
- Total area: 14,481 ha.
- Area of permanent crops: 259 ha.
- Area of perennial crops: 1,132 ha.
- Area of natural pasture: 10,249 ha.
- Area of woodland and forests: 2,564 ha.
- Persons dependent on farming: 1,600
- Farms with tractors: 50
- Number of tractors: 63 IBGE

=== Tourism ===
The region attracts visitors to the river like Rio Padre Souza, which is eight kilometers from the city and is sought after by fishermen. Rio das Almas crosses Jaraguá and is used for swimming and fishing. Rio das Pedras is about 15 kilometers from the city and many people camp on its banks. The most beautiful site in the region is Cachoeira da Usina, which is 4 kilometers from the city on a ranch called Fazenda Gilberto de Castro. The waterfall is five meters high and there is a beach nearby.

== Health and Education ==
The educational sector was small with 4 schools in 2006 and 1,709 students. The adult literacy rate was 82.3% (2000) (national average was 86.4%) In the health sector there was 1 small hospital with 28 beds in 2007. The infant mortality rate was 20.94 (2000) (national average was 33.0)

São Francisco scores 0.782 on the Municipal Human Development Index, giving it a state ranking of 157 (out of 242 municipalities) and a national ranking of 2.504 (out of 5,507 municipalities). For the complete list see frigoletto.com.br.

== See also ==
- List of municipalities in Goiás
