= Nerópolis =

- Municipality
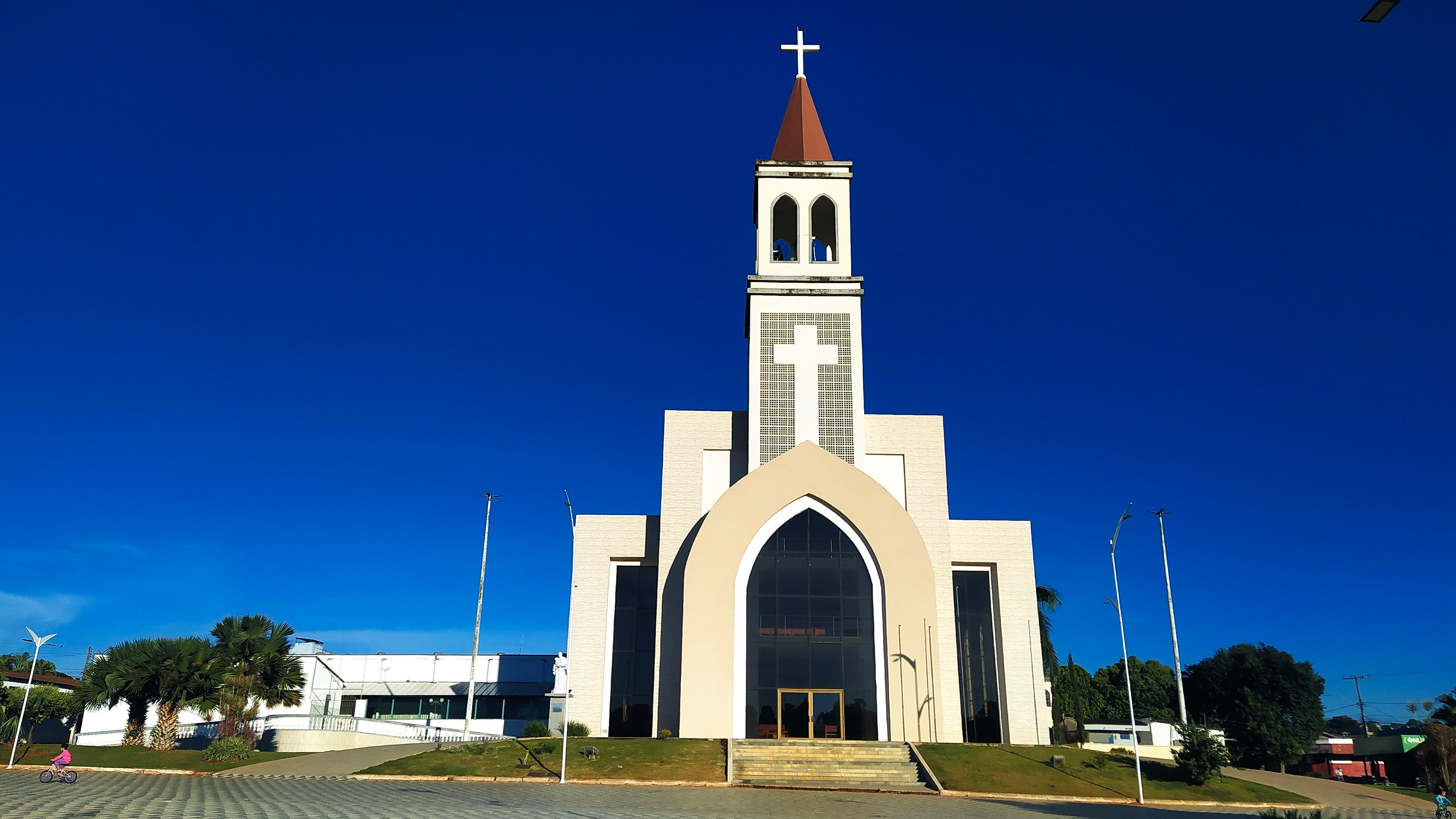

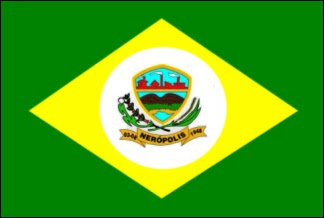
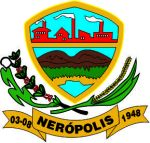
- Flag Coat of arms

- Location in Goiás state

- Location in Brazil
- Coordinates: 16°24′18″S 49°13′00″W
- Country: Brazil
- Region: Central-West
- State: Goiás

Area
  - Total: 204.2 km^{2} (78.8 sq mi)
- Elevation: 832 m (2,730 ft)

Population (2020)
  - Total: 30,395
  - Density: 148.8/km^{2} (385.5/sq mi)
- Time zone: UTC−3 (BRT)
- Postal code: 75460-000

Nerópolis (Portuguese: [neˈɾɔpolis]) is a municipality in central Goiás state, Brazil.

== Location ==
The municipality is part of the metropolitan region of Goiânia, which is 25 kilometers to the west. It is nationally known as the city of garlic and sweets. Strategically located, it is crossed by highways GO-080 and GO-222, with connections to Belém, Mato Grosso, and is near the national capital of Brasília and the state capital of Goiânia. Besides these advantages it is located in a region of high agricultural productivity, a factor that has attracted large industries to the town, such as Quero Indústrias Alimentícias; national leader in tomato paste, peas and canned corn, which employs 1,200 workers.

The municipality contains part of the 2,132-hectare (5,270-acre) Altamiro de Moura Pacheco State Park, created in 1992.

== History ==
The region was part of the municipality of Pirenópolis until 1892 when it became part of Santana das Antas, present-day Anápolis. In 1894 Joaquim Taveira established himself with his family to cut down the trees and plant crops. He attracted other families and soon a settlement arose with the name Matinha dos Taveiras. In 1904 this name was changed to Campo Alegre. In 1918 the name was changed again to Cerrado, and then in 1930 to Nerópolis, a tribute to Senator Nero Macedo, an early twentieth century politician who had promised to bring the railroad to the region. It became a municipality in 1948.

== Politics ==
In January 2005 the Mayor was Wilmar Martins Teixeira. There were 9 council members on the city council and the number of eligible voters was 15,767 in 2004.

== Demographics ==
In 2007 the population density was 94.96 inhabitants/km^{2}. In 2007 the urban population was 18,220 and the rural population was 1,172. The population has more than doubled since 1980, when it was 9,368. From 2000 to 2007 the geometric population growth was 0.61.%.

== Economy ==
From the 1970s to the 1990s Nerópolis was one of the largest producers of garlic in the country. With a drop in the price in eastern Asia, its production fell drastically. Today the city is still one of the largest importers and distributors of garlic in the country. The economic sector is also characterized by brickworks, coffee growing, and fruit and vegetables for the Goiânia market. There are several sweets factories and its products are well known all over the country.

In 2007 there were 60 industrial establishments and 202 retail establishments. There were 2 financial institutions: Banco do Brasil S.A and Banco Itaú S.A. The economic sectors employing most of the population were: transformation industries; transport; and commerce.

The cattle herd is large considering the small dimensions of the municipality. There were 37,000 head in 2006, including 4,750 milking cows. The poultry industry is well developed with 192,400 head in 2006.

The main agricultural products in 2006 were bananas, coffee, figs, guavas, oranges, pineapple, garlic, rice, corn, and tomatoes. None exceeded 200 hectares in planted area.

== Health and education ==
In 2007 there was 1 hospital with 115 beds and 6 walk-in units. The infant mortality rate was 10.74, well below the national average of 35.0 in 2000.

In 2005 the school system had 14 schools, 105 classrooms, 242 teachers, and 6,398 students. There were 2 public secondary schools. In 2000 the adult literacy rate was 87.7%, higher than the national average of 86.4 in the same year.

== Municipal Human Development Index ==
- MHDI: 0.785
- State ranking: 20 (out of 242 municipalities in 2000)
- National ranking: 934 (out of 5,507 municipalities in 2000)

For the complete list see Frigoletto.com

== See also ==
- List of municipalities in Goiás
