= Trombas =

- Municipality
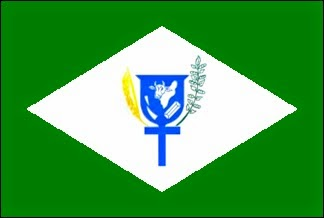
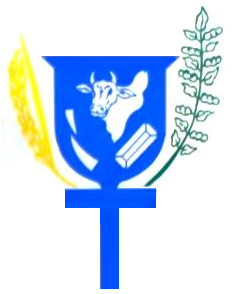
- Flag Coat of arms

- Location in Goiás state

- Location in Brazil
- Coordinates: 13°30′29″S 48°44′31″W
- Country: Brazil
- Region: Central-West
- State: Goiás
- Microregion: Porangatu Microregion

Area
  - Total: 799.1 km^{2} (308.5 sq mi)
- Elevation: 355 m (1,165 ft)

Population (2020)
  - Total: 3,498
  - Density: 4.377/km^{2} (11.34/sq mi)
- Time zone: UTC−3 (BRT)
- Postal code: 76460-000

Trombas is a municipality in north Goiás state, Brazil.

== Location ==
Trombas is located in the extreme north of the state, between Formoso and Montividiu do Norte. It is east of the regional center, Porangatu. The distance to Goiânia is 424 km. Highway connections are made by GO-080 / Nerópolis / São Francisco de Goiás / BR-153 / Jaraguá / GO-080 / Goianésia / Barro Alto / GO-342 / BR-080 / BR-153 / Uruaçu / Santa Tereza de Goiás / GO-241 / Formoso / GO-142.

Trombas is a municipality surrounded by the following municipalities:

- north: Montividiu do Norte
- south: Formoso, Campinorte and Campinaçu
- east: Minaçu
- west: Santa Tereza de Goiás and Porangatu

== Political information and demographics ==
In January 2005 the mayor was Elson Carlos da Silva. There were 9 members on the city council and 2,864 eligible voters in December 2007. In 2007 the population density was 4.43 inhabitants/km^{2}. In 2007 there were 2,267 people living in the urban area and 1,270 living in the rural area. The population has decreased by almost 3,500 people since 1991.

== Economy ==
The economy is based on cattle raising, agriculture, services, and government employment. In 2007 there were 2 industrial units and 28 retail units.

- Farms: 474
- Total agricultural Area: 55,760 hectares
- Permanent Planted Area: 127 hectares
- Temporary Planted Area: 1,125 hectares
- Natural Pasture: 34,880 hectares
- Woodland and Forest: 17,933 hectares
- Workers related to the farm owner: 1,131
- Workers not related to the farm owner: 64 (IBGE)
- Cattle herd: 46,700 head (2006)
- Main crops: rice (400 hectares) corn (500 hectares), and soybeans (500 hectares).

== Education and health ==
In the educational sector there were 4 schools with 1,079 students in 2006. The adult literacy rate was 83.2% (2000) (national average was 86.4%) The town was served by one hospital with 15 beds. The infant mortality rate was 16.72 (2000) (national average was 33.0).

- Municipal Human Development Index: Trombas occupies a middle-level position in the state, 96 out of 242 municipalities. The MHDI was 0.743 with a state ranking of 96 (out of 242 municipalities) and a national ranking of 2,074 (out of 5,507 municipalities).
- Seplan Economic Development Index: The ranking was 215 out of 246 municipalities.
- Seplan Social Development Index: The ranking was 201 out of 246 municipalities.

== See also ==
- List of municipalities in Goiás
- Microregions of Goiás
