= Montividiu do Norte =

Montividiu do Norte QUEBRA ROLA
- Municipality
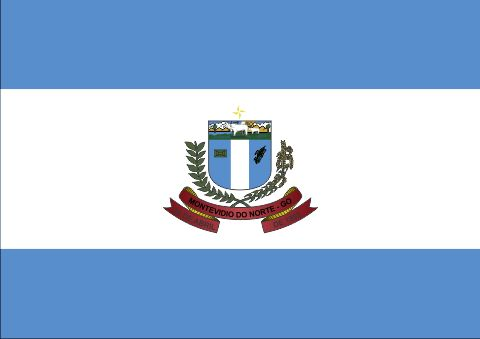
- Flag

- Location in Goiás state

- Location in Brazil
- Coordinates: 13°06′40″S 48°36′10″W
- Country: Brazil
- Region: Central-West
- State: Goiás
- Microregion: Porangatu Microregion

Area
  - Total: 1,333 km^{2} (515 sq mi)
- Elevation: 435 m (1,427 ft)

Population (2026)
  - Total: 3.717
  - Density: 0.002788/km^{2} (0.007222/sq mi)
- Time zone: UTC−3 (BRT)
- Postal code: 76465-000

Montividiu do Norte is a municipality in Goiás state, Brazil. It is a part of the Porangatu Microregion. It had a population in 2026 of 3.717. It became a municipality in 1993.

== Location ==
Montividiu do Norte is located in the extreme north of the state, only 34 km. south of the border from the state of Tocantins. It is situated between two rivers: Rio Santa Teresa and Rio Canabrava, both of which are tributaries of the Tocantins River.

- Distance to Goiânia: 444 km
- Distance to Porangatu: 61 km

Highway connections to Goiânia are made by GO-080 / Nerópolis / São Francisco de Goiás / BR-153 / Jaraguá / GO-080 / Goianésia / Barro Alto / BR-080 / GO-342 / BR-153 / Uruaçu / Santa Tereza de Goiás / GO-241 / Formoso / GO-142 / Trombas.

Montividiu do Norte is surrounded by the following municipalities:

- north: Tocantins
- east: Porangatu
- west: Minaçu
- south: Trombas

== Demographics ==
In 2007, the population density was 3.30 inhabitants/km^{2}. The population has been growing rapidly since the first count in 1996, when it was 2,610. The population is almost evenly distributed between urban and rural areas. The growth rate between 1996 and 2007 was 4.85%.

== Politics ==
In February 2007, the Mayor was Misael Antônio Teixeira. The city council had nine members, and there were 2,899 eligible voters in 2007.

== Economy ==
The economy is based on agriculture, cattle raising, services, public administration, and small transformation industries. In 2007, there was one industrial unit and 30 retail units. There were no financial institutions in the town in 2005. There were 127 automobiles, 14 trucks, 51 pickup trucks, and 187 motorcycles (2007). (IBGE)

As of 2006, there were 74,600 head of cattle, of which 6,200 were milk cows. Poultry and swine production was modest. The main agricultural products were rice, bananas, sugarcane, corn, and soybeans. None exceeded 1,000 hectares in planted area.

== Agricultural Census (2006) ==
- Farms: 699
- Planted area: 796 hectares
- Natural Pasture: 80,871 hectares
- Woodland: 24,811 hectares
- Persons occupied related to the farm owner: 1,513
- Persons occupied not related to farm owner: 66 (IBGE)

== Health and education ==
As of 2007, there were no hospitals and one walk-in health clinic. The infant mortality rate was 48.95%—one of the highest in the state.

As of 2006, the school system had nine schools with 1,364 students. There were no institutions of higher learning. The adult literacy rate was 80.9%.

== Municipal Human Development Index ==
- Municipal Human Development Index MHDI: 0.659
- State ranking: 232 (out of 242 municipalities)
- National ranking: 3,629 (out of 5,507 municipalities)

== Index of Economic Development (Seplan 2001) ==
- 225/246 municipalities. See Seplan

== Index of Social Development (Seplan 2000) ==
- 241/246 municipalities. See Seplan

== See also ==
- List of municipalities in Goiás
