= Bonópolis =

- Municipality
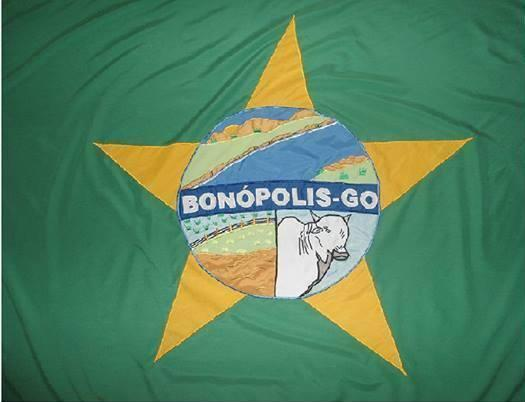
- Flag

- Location in Goiás state

- Location in Brazil
- Coordinates: 13°39′12″S 49°49′53″W
- Country: Brazil
- Region: Central-West
- State: Goiás
- Microregion: Porangatu Microregion

Area
  - Total: 1,628 km^{2} (629 sq mi)
- Elevation: 290 m (950 ft)

Population (2020)
  - Total: 4,493
  - Density: 2.760/km^{2} (7.148/sq mi)
- Time zone: UTC−3 (BRT)
- Postal code: 76555-000

Bonópolis is a municipality in north Goiás state, Brazil. It is largely rural with a substantial cattle herd.

== Location ==
- Highway connections from Goiânia: GO-080 / Nerópolis / BR-153 / Jaraguá / GO-080 / Goianésia / Barro Alto / GO-342 / Uruaçu / Campinorte / GO-329 / GO-080 / Estrela do Norte / GO-241/ Mutunópolis / GO-241 / (70 km unpaved).

Bonópolis is surrounded by the following municipalities:

- north: Novo Planalto
- east: Porangatu
- west: São Miguel do Araguaia
- south: Amaralina

== Economy ==
The main economic activities are cattle raising (134,000 head in 2006) and plantations of rice (1,560 tons in 650 hectares planted), sugarcane, manioc (2,400 tons in 150 hectares planted), corn (1800 tons in 600 hectares planted), and soybeans (4,050 tons in 1,500 hectares planted. In 2006 there were 402 farms with a total area of 198,313 hectares, of which 2,074 hectares were planted. Farming occupied around 1,200 workers. Most of the farms were involved in livestock raising. There were no banks in 2007.

== Health and education ==
There were 4 schools with 1,113 students in 2006. Bonópolis is one of the poorest municipalities in the state with a Municipal Human Development Index rating of 0.683

- State ranking: 222 (out of 242 municipalities)
- National ranking: 3255 (out of 5507 municipalities)

== See also ==
- List of municipalities in Goiás
- Microregions of Goiás
