= Novo Planalto =

- Municipality
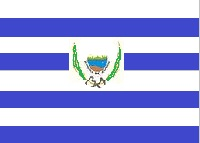
- Flag

- Location in Goiás state

- Location in Brazil
- Coordinates: 13°14′52″S 49°23′33″W
- Country: Brazil
- Region: Central-West
- State: Goiás
- Microregion: São Miguel do Araguaia Microregion

Area
  - Total: 1,242 km^{2} (480 sq mi)
- Elevation: 304 m (997 ft)

Population (2020)
  - Total: 4,544
  - Density: 3.659/km^{2} (9.476/sq mi)
- Time zone: UTC−3 (BRT)
- Postal code: 76580-000

Novo Planalto is a municipality in north Goiás state, Brazil.

Novo Planalto is in the São Miguel do Araguaia Microregion, 47 kilometers east of São Miguel on highway GO-244. It is on the boundary dividing the state of Goiás with Tocantins. The same highway connects Novo Planalto with Porangatu, 50 kilometers to the east. The distance to the state capital, Goiânia, is 478 km. Highway connections from Goiânia and made by GO-080 / Nerópolis / São Francisco de Goiás / BR-153 / Jaraguá / GO-080 / Goianésia / Barro Alto / BR-080 / GO-342 / Uruaçu / Campinorte / GO-241 / Santa Tereza de Goiás / BR-414 / BR-153 / Porangatu / GO-244 /.

Municipal boundaries are with:

- north: Tocantins
- south: Bonópolis
- east: São Miguel do Araguaia
- west: Porangatu

In January 2005 the Mayor was Odair Justino de Souza. There were nine city-council members and 3,063 eligible voters in 2007. De Souza won the 2004 elections with 961 votes against his rival who had 910. He represented a coalition of the PL / PPS / PT / PFL parties.

In 2007 the population density was 3.21 inhabitants/km^{2}. In 2007 there were 2,520 inhabitants in the urban area and 466 in the rural area. The population has decreased about 500 persons since the first census of 1991.

The economy is based on agriculture, cattle raising, timber extraction and processing, services, and public employment. In 2007 there were no industrial units and 25 commercial units. There were no financial institutions. In 2007 there were 141 automobiles and 194 motorcycles.

In 2006 there were 95,000 head of cattle. The main agricultural products were rice, bananas, sugarcane, manioc, soybeans (1,200 hectares), and corn (1,000 hectares).

- Farms: 412
- Total agricultural Area: 85,870 hectares
- Permanent Planted Area: 121 hectares
- Temporary Planted Area: 885 hectares
- Natural Pasture: 66,230 hectares
- Woodland and Forest: 18,337 hectares
- Workers related to the farm owner: 1,021
- Workers not related to the farm owner: 231 (IBGE)
- Tractors: 86
- Number of farms with tractors: 50

In 2007 there were no hospitals and one walk-in health clinic. In 2000 the infant mortality rate was 27.36, below the national average of 33.0. In 2006 the school system had three schools, with 27 classrooms, 52 teachers, and 1,181 students. In 2000 the adult literacy rate was 82.5%, below the national average of 86.4%.

Novo Planalto ranks 0.715 on the 2000 United Nations Human Development Index and is 185 out of 242 municipalities in the state and 2,719 out of 5,507 municipalities in the country. On the Seplan Economic Development Index (2001) the ranking was 85 out of 246 municipalities (2001). See Seplan, while on the Seplan Social Development Index (2000) the ranking was 132 out of 246 municipalities (2000) See Seplan

== See also ==
- List of municipalities in Goiás
