= Campinaçu =

- Municipality
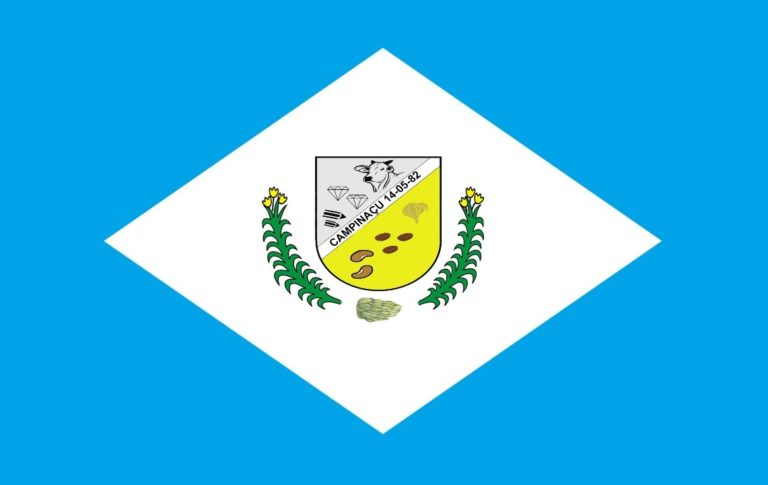
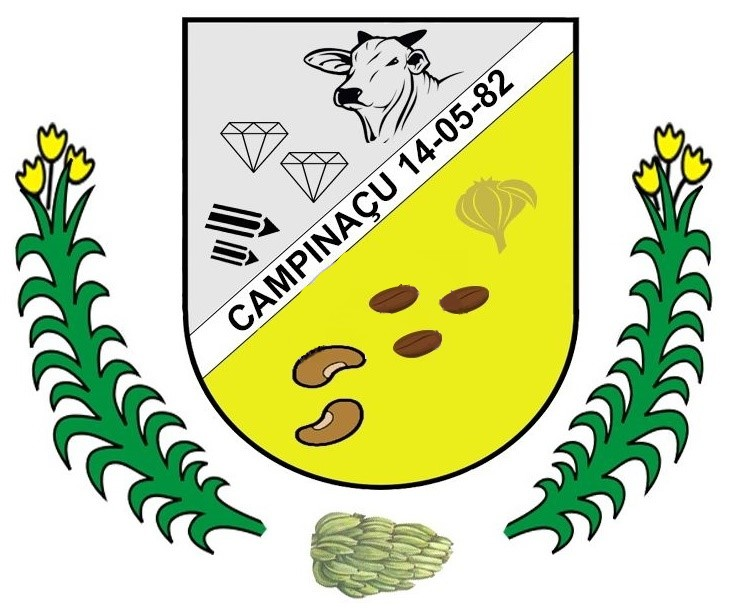
- Flag Coat of arms

- Location in Goiás state

- Location in Brazil
- Coordinates: 13°47′26″S 48°33′39″W
- Country: Brazil
- Region: Central-West
- State: Goiás
- Microregion: Porangatu Microregion

Area
  - Total: 1,974 km^{2} (762 sq mi)
- Elevation: 690 m (2,260 ft)

Population (2020)
  - Total: 3,632
  - Density: 1.840/km^{2} (4.765/sq mi)
- Time zone: UTC−3 (BRT)
- Postal code: 76440-000

Campinaçu is a municipality in north Goiás state, Brazil.

== Location ==
Campinaçu is surrounded by the following municipalities:

- north: Minaçu
- east: Colinas do Sul
- west: Campinorte and Uruaçu
- south: Niquelândia
- Distance to Goiânia: 462 km.
- Highway connections from Goiânia: GO-080 / Nerópolis / São Francisco de Goiás / BR-153 / Jaraguá / GO-080 / Goianésia / Barro Alto / GO-342 / BR-080 / BR-153 / Uruaçu / Santa Tereza de Goiás / GO-241 / Formoso.

== Demographics ==
In 2007 the population density was 1.91 inhabitants/km^{2}. The population growth rate for 2000/2007 was 0.22.%. The urban population in 2007 was 2,119 while the rural population was 1,646.

== The economy ==
The main economic activities are cattle raising with 64,500 head (IBGE 2006) and plantations of rice, corn, manioc, and sugar cane. In 2006 there were 545 farms with 21,660 hectares of cropland and 75,511 of pasture. There were approximately 1,600 persons connected to agriculture, the vast majority members of the farm owner's family.

- Retail units: 33
- Financial institutions: none
- Automobiles in 2007: 116

== Health and education ==
The infant mortality rate (2000) was 14.32 while the literacy rate was 80.5%. In 2007 there was one hospital with 19 beds.

- public health clinics: 02
- hospitals: 01 with 19 beds

With a score of 0.733 Campinaçu occupies 132nd place out of 242 municipalities in the state on the Municipal Human Development Index.

- State ranking: 132 (out of 242 municipalities)
- National ranking: 2,345 (out of 5,505 municipalities)

== See also ==
- List of municipalities in Goiás
- Microregions of Goiás
