= Estrela do Norte, Goiás =

Estrela do Norte
- Municipality
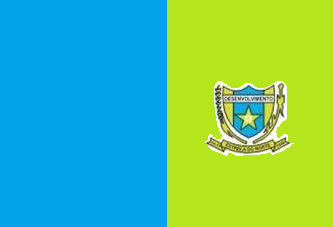
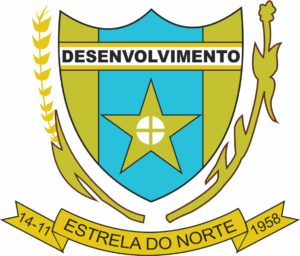
- Flag Coat of arms

- Location in Goiás state

- Location in Brazil
- Coordinates: 13°52′34″S 49°04′00″W
- Country: Brazil
- Region: Central-West
- State: Goiás
- Microregion: Porangatu Microregion

Area
  - Total: 302 km^{2} (117 sq mi)
- Elevation: 453 m (1,486 ft)

Population (2020)
  - Total: 3,264
  - Density: 10.8/km^{2} (28.0/sq mi)
- Time zone: UTC−3 (BRT)
- Postal code: 76485-000

Estrela do Norte is municipality in north Goiás state, Brazil. The population was 3,264 (2020) and the total area was 302.7 km^{2} (116.9 sq mi).

Estrela do Norte is a municipality surrounded by the following municipalities:

- north: Mutunópolis and Santa Tereza de Goiás
- south: Mara Rosa
- east: Amaralina
- west: Formoso

The distance to Goiânia is 365 km. Highway connections are made by GO-080 / Nerópolis / São Francisco de Goiás / BR-153 / Jaraguá / GO-080 / Goianésia / Barro Alto / BR-080 / GO-342 / Uruaçu / Campinorte / GO-241.

The economy is based on cattle raising and agriculture, especially corn, rice, and soybeans. In 2007 there was one dairy, no banks, and 39 retail units. There were 205 automobiles.

- Cattle: 22,800 head

In 2006 there were 185 farms with 1,125 hectares planted. There were 20,000 hectares of pasture. Approximately 500 persons were employed in farming. There was modest production of rice, corn, and soybeans. Data are from IBGE

The literacy rate was 81.1% (2000) and the infant mortality rate was 16.72 in 1,000 live births. There were 05 schools with 1,090 students and one hospital with 17 beds.

Estrela do Norte occupies a middle-level position on the Municipal Human Development Index with a score of 0.746, 87 out of 242 municipalities in the state in 2000.

Mayor José da Silva, who died in January 1997, helped the community grow and brought it recognition from across the region, drawing the attention of former Governor Irapuan Costa Júnior as well as Leonino Caiado

== See also ==
- List of municipalities in Goiás
