= Nova Iguaçu de Goiás =

- Municipality
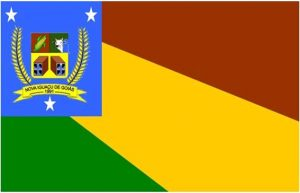
- Flag

- Location in Goiás state

- Location in Brazil
- Coordinates: 14°17′03″S 49°23′18″W
- Country: Brazil
- Region: Central-West
- State: Goiás
- Microregion: Porangatu Microregion

Area
  - Total: 628 km^{2} (242 sq mi)
- Elevation: 409 m (1,342 ft)

Population (2020)
  - Total: 2,934
  - Density: 4.67/km^{2} (12.1/sq mi)
- Time zone: UTC−3 (BRT)
- Postal code: 76495-000

Nova Iguaçu de Goiás is a municipality in north Goiás state, Brazil.

== Location ==
Nova Iguaçu de Goiás is located in the extreme north of the state and is 136 km from the regional center of Porangatu. Other towns nearby are Campinorte, 28 km. to the east; Alto Horizonte, 12 km. to the north; and Santa Terezinha de Goiás, 38 km. to the southwest.

Nova Iguaçu de Goiás is surrounded by the following municipalities:

- north: Alto Horizonte and Mara Rosa
- south: Uruaçu
- east: Campinorte
- west: Campos Verdes de Goiás

The distance to Goiânia is 338 km. Highway connections are made by GO-080 / Nerópolis / São Francisco de Goiás / BR-153 / Jaraguá / GO-080 / Goianésia / Barro Alto / GO-342 / BR-080 / BR-153 / Uruaçu / Campinorte / GO-428.

== Political and demographic information ==
In January 2005 the mayor was Adelino Serra Alves. There were 9 city-council members and the number of eligible voters was 2,240 (2007). In 2007 the population density was 4.17 inhabitants/km^{2}. There were 1,763 urban inhabitants and 859 rural inhabitants. The population has been in decline since the first census in 1996, losing almost 500 residents. Population growth rate: -0,71% 1996/2007

== Economic information ==
The economy is based on modest transformation industries, services, public employment, cattle raising, and agriculture. In 2007 there were 4 industrial and 17 retail units. In 2007 there were 109 automobiles in the town.

== Agricultural census (2006) ==
- Farms: 237
- Planted area: 1,135 hectares
- Natural Pasture: 53,300 hectares
- Woodland and Forest: 28,824 hectares
- Persons occupied related to the farm owner: 596
- Persons occupied not related to the farm owner: 50
- Cattle: 39,000 head
- rice: 280 hectares
- corn: 400 hectares (IBGE 2006)

== Health and education ==
In 2007 there were no hospitals and only one walk-in health clinic. The infant mortality rate was 27.56, below the national average of 33.0. In 2006 the school system had 5 schools and 788 students. There was one middle school with 170 students. In 2000 the adult literacy rate was 84.3%, below the national average of 86.4%.

== Ranking on development indexes ==
Municipal Human Development Index

- Nova Iguaçu de Goiás is ranked 166 out of 242 municipalities on the MHDI-M.
- MHDI: 0.723
- State ranking: 166 (out of 246 municipalities)
- National ranking: 2,571 (out of 5,505 municipalities)

Index of Economic Development (Seplan 2001)

- 229/246 municipalities. See Seplan

Index of Social Development (Seplan 2000)

- 240/246 municipalities. See Seplan

== See also ==
- List of municipalities in Goiás
