= Amaralina =

- Municipality
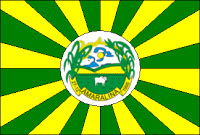
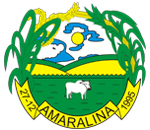
- Flag Coat of arms

- Location in Goiás state

- Location in Brazil
- Coordinates: 13°55′42″S 49°17′27″W
- Country: Brazil
- Region: Central-West
- State: Goiás
- Microregion: Porangatu Microregion

Area
  - Total: 1,412.9 km^{2} (545.5 sq mi)
- Elevation: 485 m (1,591 ft)

Population (2010)
  - Total: 3,434
  - Density: 2.430/km^{2} (6.295/sq mi)
- Time zone: UTC−3 (BRT)
- Postal code: 76493-000

Amaralina is a municipality in north Goiás state, Brazil.

== Location ==
- Distance from Goiânia: 485 km.
- Highway access from Goiânia: GO-080 / Nerópolis / BR-153 / Jaraguá / GO-080 / Goianésia / Barro Alto / GO-342 / Uruaçu / Campinorte / GO-329.

Amaralina is surrounded by the following municipalities:

- north: Mutunópolis, Bonópolis and Porangatu
- south and east: Mara Rosa
- west: Mundo Novo

== Demographics ==
The urban population was 1,143 (2007) while the rural population was 2,349. Rarely, for Goiás, the rural population outnumbers the urban population.

- Population growth 2000/2007: 1.84.%

== The economy ==
The economy is dependent on cattle raising, services, public service jobs, and agriculture. There were 121,000 head of cattle in 2006. The main agricultural products in 2006 were rice (650 hectares planted), corn (750 hectares), and bananas (45 hectares). IBGE. In 2006 there were 595 farms with a total area of 486,855 hectares, of which 10,657 were under cultivation, 389,210 were pasture, and 85,527 were woodland. There were 1,810 persons related to the producer working on these farms and 487 persons employed. In 2007 there were 63 automobiles, but 102 motorcycles. (IBGE)

== Health and education ==
There were no hospitals in 2007, while there were 12 schools with 1,030 students in 2006. The infant mortality rate in 2000 was 41.40 while the literacy rate was 79.7. The score on the Municipal Human Development Index was 0.660 giving a state ranking of 231 (out of 242 municipalities) and a national ranking of 3,607 (out of 5,507 municipalities)

== See also ==
- List of municipalities in Goiás
- Microregions of Goiás
