= Mara Rosa =

- Municipality
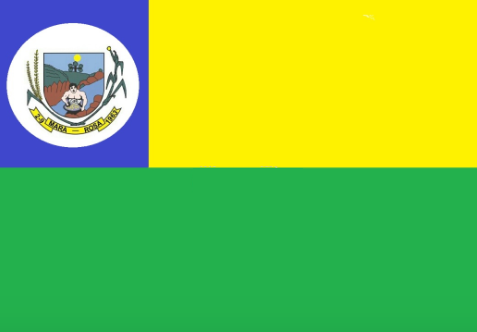
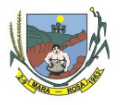
- Flag Coat of arms

- Location in Goiás state

- Location in Brazil
- Coordinates: 14°01′02″S 49°10′35″W
- Country: Brazil
- Region: Central-West
- State: Goiás
- Microregion: Porangatu Microregion

Area
  - Total: 1,704 km^{2} (658 sq mi)
- Elevation: 530 m (1,740 ft)

Population (2020)
  - Total: 9,363
  - Density: 5.495/km^{2} (14.23/sq mi)
- Time zone: UTC−3 (BRT)
- Postal code: 76490-000

Mara Rosa is a municipality in north-central Goiás state, Brazil.

== Location ==
Mara Rosa is located 356 kilometers north of Goiânia in the Porangatu Microregion. It is 11 kilometers east of the Belém-Brasília highway, between the basins of the Araguaia River and the Tocantins River. Neighboring municipalities are: Alto Horizonte, Amaralina, Campinorte, Campos Verdes de Goiás, Estrela do Norte, Formoso, Mutunópolis, Nova Iguaçu de Goiás, Santa Terezinha de Goiás, and Uirapuru.

Highway communications with Goiânia are made by GO-080 / Nerópolis / São Francisco de Goiás / BR-153 / Jaraguá / GO-080 / Goianésia / Barro Alto / GO-342 / BR-153 / Uruaçu / Campinorte / GO-239.

== History ==
Mara Rosa is considered one of the oldest municipalities in the state. The discovery of gold took many people to the region. The first houses appeared in 1742, 15 years after the founding of Vila Boa, the former capital of the state. The first name was Amaro Leite, a tribute to its founder, Amaro Leite Moreira. The district of Amaro Leite belonged to the Comarca de Pilar in 1911. In 1933 it was a district of Santana de Uruaçu. In 1953 it separated from Uruaçu to become the city of Amaro Leite. This settlement was transferred to another site and in 1960 the name was changed to Mara Rosa as a tribute to José Maurício de Moura.

== Political information ==
In 2012 new mayor Elvino Coelho Furtado was elected the new mayor, his tenure runs until 2016 when election will take place. In January 2005 the mayor was Otávio Alves Neto and the vice-mayor was Ostervaldo Gomes de Aguiar. There were 9 members of the city council and the number of eligible voters was 8,347 in December 2007.

== Demographic information ==
The population density was 6.11 inhabitants/km^{2} in 2007. The population has decreased greatly since 1980, when it was 21,524. From 1996 to 2007 the decrease was 3.19%. Most of this decrease has been in the rural area. In 1980 the rural population was 16,309 and by 2007 it had decreased to 2,700. Most of these people did not move into the town itself but most likely emigrated to the large urban centers of Anápolis, Goiânia, and Brasília.

== Economy ==
There are deposits of phosphates, lead, copper, gold, and silver. Mara Rosa is the biggest producer of saffron in the state of Goiás and there are also important plantations of corn, soybeans, and rice. There are small industries producing cheese and furniture. In 2006 there 902 farms with 5,448 hectares of planted area and 76,000 hectares of pasture. Approximately 2,300 persons were dependent on the farming sector in 2005.

In 2007 there were 21 industrial units and 124 retail units. There was one dairy—Laticínios Mara Rosa Ltda. There was one bank institution—Banco do Brasil S.A. The biggest employer was the retail sector with 255 workers in 2006. There were 713 automobiles in 2007.

The cattle herd was quite large with 120,000 head in 2006. The main agricultural products in planted area were corn with 2,000 hectares in 2006 . Other crops were manioc, rice, sugarcane, soybeans, and bananas. Saffron has become a planting option in recent years.

== Health and education ==
In 2007 there were 2 hospitals with 31 beds and 6 walk-in health clinics. The infant mortality rate was 27.56 in 2000.

In 2006 there were 11 schools with 3,282 students. There were no courses in higher education. The adult literacy rate was 82.3% in 2000.

- 2000 Municipal Human Development Index: 0.713
- State ranking: 192 (out of 246 municipalities)
- National ranking: 2,757 (out of 5,507 municipalities)
- Ranking on state Economic Development Index: 157/246 municipalities (Seplan)
- Ranking on state Social Development Index: 66/246 (Seplan)

== See also ==
- List of municipalities in Goiás
