= Campos Verdes =

- Municipality
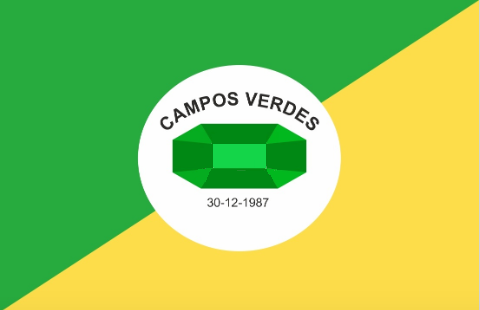
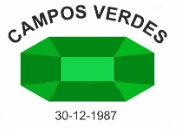
- Flag Coat of arms

- Location in Goiás state

- Location in Brazil
- Coordinates: 14°15′57″S 49°38′51″W
- Country: Brazil
- Region: Central-West
- State: Goiás
- Microregion: Porangatu

Area
  - Total: 443.0 km^{2} (171.0 sq mi)
- Elevation: 420 m (1,380 ft)

Population (2020)
  - Total: 1,830
  - Density: 4.13/km^{2} (10.7/sq mi)
- Time zone: UTC−3 (BRT)
- Postal code: 76515-000

Campos Verdes is a municipality in north Goiás state, Brazil. Campos Verdes was known as the emerald capital of Goiás but is fast losing population as the emeralds have run out.

== Location ==
It is located 321 kilometers from the state capital, Goiânia in the Porangatu Microregion. Access from Goiânia is made by GO-080 / Nerópolis / Petrolina de Goiás / BR-153 / Jaraguá / Rialma / GO-336 / Itapaci / GO-154 / Pilar de Goiás / Santa Terezinha de Goiás.

Municipal boundaries are with:

- North: Mara Rosa
- South: Santa Tereza de Goiás
- East: Alto Horizonte
- West: Uirapuru

== Economy ==
=== Mining ===
With the discovery of emeralds in the region the population reached almost 50 thousand in the 1990s, but has now dropped to fewer than 7 thousand.

It is the typical example of the mining town that grew overnight, with almost no infrastructure, and soon lost its population due to the disappearance of the mineral that had created its wealth. Today Campos Verdes is known by many as a ghost town.

Campos Verdes began when minerals were discovered in 1981. Attracted by the mines, the first settlers began to arrive, forming a settlement called Garimpo, which at the time was a district of Santa Terezinha de Goiás. In 1987 it was raised to the status of municipality.

=== Agriculture ===
Despite the drop in mineral activity there is still agricultural production based on cattle raising (34,500 head in 2006) and plantations with modest production of pineapple, rice, sugarcane, manioc, and corn. In 2006 there were 224 agricultural units with 1,157 hectares under cultivation. There were 25,476 hectares of pasture. Approximately 600 persons were involved in agriculture. There was one bank.

== Health and education ==
The town had one hospital with 56 beds (2007). The infant mortality rate in 2000 was 41.40. There were 09 schools with 2,704 students. The number of schools and students has dropped dramatically since 2000 when there were 17 schools with 5,358 students. The literacy rate in 2000 was 81.7 Seplan

The score on the Municipal Human Development Index was 0.694.

- State ranking: 215 (out of 242 municipalities)
- National ranking: 3,098 (out of 5,507 municipalities)

== See also ==
- List of municipalities in Goiás
