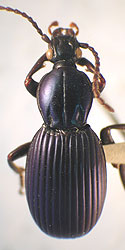
- Pelecium violaceum

Scientific classification
- Kingdom: Animalia
- Phylum: Arthropoda
- Clade: Pancrustacea
- Class: Insecta
- Order: Coleoptera
- Suborder: Adephaga
- Family: Carabidae
- Subfamily: Panagaeinae
- Tribe: Peleciini
- Subtribe: Peleciina
- Genus: Pelecium; Kirby, 1819

Subgenera
- Pelecidium Straneo & Ball, 1989; Pelecium Kirby, 1819

= Pelecium =

Genus of beetles

Pelecium is a genus in the beetle family Carabidae. There are more than 40 described species in the genus, which is found in Central and South America. The center of diversity for the genus is Brazil, with over thirty species endemic to that country. The beetles are flightless.

== Description ==
The dorsum is bright. The head usually has a pair of frontal foveae and one pair of supraorbital setae. The labium and maxilla are well-developed, with the fourth maxillary palpomere twice as long as the third. The terminal maxillary and labial palpomeres usually triangular to axe-shaped, but can sometimes be oval. The mandible groove is large and devoid of hairs. The glossa bisetose and the labrum has three pairs of setae dorsally. The mentum has a median tooth. The antennae are prepubescent and filiform, with a scape that is two to three times larger than the pedicel. The pronotum has a variable shape, usually with a median line and pair of posterior impressions. The scutellar shield is triangular.

The legs have a short trochanter one-fourth to one-ftifth as long as the metafemur. The tibiae have yellow setae throughout the inner margin and an inner spur is present. The long spur is inserted on the anterior border of the antennal cleaner. Protarsomeres 1–4 are enlarged and ventrally covered by adhesive setae, with protarsomere 4 having two lobes. Mesotarsomeres and metatarsomeres 1–4 are ventrally covered with yellow setae. The metendosternite stalk twice as long as it is wide, with well-developed laminae and moderately long lateral arms. There are no ventrolateral or anterior processes.

The elytra is oval, usually with deeply impressed striae. The hind-wings are undeveloped. Males have asymmetrical terminalia and a cylindrical aedeagus. The parameres are drastically asymmetrical. Females have ensiform setae on each side at the basal lobe of the gonocoxite.

== Distribution and biology ==
Pelecium is widely distributed in Central and South America, being found from Panama to central Argentina. The center of diversity for the genus is Brazil, with nearly 40 species found in the country, of which over thirty are only found there. Most species of Pelecium occur in the Brazilian Atlantic Forest and Cerrado biomes, mainly in the states of Minas Gerais, Mato Grosso, São Paulo, Paraná, and Santa Catarina.

Little is known of their biology, but the larvae of peleciine beetles have been observed acting as parasitoids of beetle pupae and young millipedes, while adults prey on millipedes. All species of Pelecium are flightless and are presumed to have a low dispersal ability, so that habitat destruction and loss may be a serious threat to them.

== Taxonomy ==
Pelecium was first circumscribed by the English entomologist William Kirby in 1817 based on specimens from Brazil. During the 20th century, the genus was most thoroughly worked on by the prolific Italian entomologist Stefano Ludovico Straneo, who published four taxonomic papers on the genus between 1953 and 1970, before publishing a complete generic revision in 1989 alongside the American entomologist George Ball. The genus was thenceforth largely ignored for over 25 years, before the description of a new species in 2016. In 2024, nine new species were described from Brazil.

Pelecium is the most diverse genus of the tribe Peleciini, with over 40 recognized species. They are organized into two subgenera, Pelecidium and Pelecium.

- Subgenus Pelecidium Straneo & Ball, 1989
  - Pelecium laevigatum Guérin-Méneville, 1843 (Colombia)
  - Pelecium sulcipenne Chaudoir, 1861 (Colombia, Venezuela, Panama)
  - Pelecium sulcatum Guérin-Méneville, 1843 (Colombia)
- Subgenus Pelecium
  - Pelecium cyanipes species group
    - Pelecium cyanipes Kirby, 1819 (Brazil)
  - Pelecium faldermanni species group
    - Pelecium besckii (Chaudoir, 1850) (Brazil)
    - Pelecium bisulcatum Straneo, 1970 (Argentina and Brazil)
    - Pelecium faldermanni (Chaudoir, 1846) (Argentina and Brazil)
    - Pelecium foveicolle Chaudoir, 1866 (Paraguay and Brazil)
    - Pelecium obtusum Straneo, 1953 (Brazil)
  - Pelecium laeve species group
    - Pelecium belloi Orsetti & Lopes-Andrade, 2024
    - Pelecium laeve Chaudoir, 1854 (Brazil)
    - Pelecium nicki Straneo, 1955 (Brazil)
    - Pelecium obscurum Straneo, 1955 (Brazil)
  - Pelecium punctatostriatum species group
    - Pelecium atroviolaceum Straneo & Ball, 1989 (Brazil)
    - Pelecium bolivianum Straneo & Ball, 1989 (Bolivia)
    - Pelecium buckupi Orsetti & Lopes-Andrade, 2024
    - Pelecium fistulosus Orsetti & Lopes-Andrade, 2024
    - Pelecium punctatostriatum Straneo, 1970 (Brazil)
    - Pelecium semistriatum Straneo & Ball, 1989 (Brazil)
    - Pelecium zaguryi Orsetti & Lopes-Andrade, 2024
  - Pelecium refulgens species group
    - Pelecium fulgidum Straneo, 1962 (Brazil)
    - Pelecium negrei Straneo, 1962 (Brazil)
    - Pelecium refulgens Guérin-Méneville, 1831 (Brazil)
  - Pelecium renati species group
    - Pelecium renati Straneo, 1953 (Brazil)
    - Pelecium striatum Straneo, 1955 (Brazil)
  - Pelecium rotundipenne species group
    - Pelecium balli Orsetti & Lopes-Andrade, 2024
    - Pelecium chrissquirei Orsetti & Lopes-Andrade, 2024
    - Pelecium helenae Straneo & Ball, 1989 (Brazil)
    - Pelecium igneus Orsetti & Lopes-Andrade, 2016 (Brazil)
    - Pelecium paulae Straneo & Ball, 1989 (Brazil)
    - Pelecium purpureum Straneo, 1955 (Brazil)
    - Pelecium rotundipenne Schaum, 1860 (Brazil)
    - Pelecium straneoi Orsetti & Lopes-Andrade, 2024
  - Pelecium violaceum species group
    - Pelecium brasiliense Straneo, 1962 (Brazil)
    - Pelecium drakei Quedenfeldt, 1890 (Paraguay and Brazil)
    - Pelecium grossii Orsetti & Lopes-Andrade, 2024
    - Pelecium longicolle Straneo, 1953 (Paraguay and Brazil)
    - Pelecium parallelum Straneo & Ball, 1989 (Brazil)
    - Pelecium punctatum Straneo, 1953 (Bolivia)
    - Pelecium striatipenne Chaudoir, 1866 (Brazil)
    - Pelecium tenellum Schaum, 1860 (Brazil)
    - Pelecium violaceum Brullé, 1838 (Bolivia, Argentina, Paraguay, Brazil)
    - Pelecium zophos Orsetti & Lopes-Andrade, 2024
