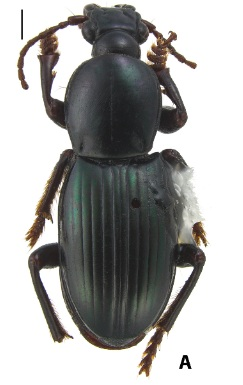

Scientific classification
- Kingdom: Animalia
- Phylum: Arthropoda
- Clade: Pancrustacea
- Class: Insecta
- Order: Coleoptera
- Suborder: Adephaga
- Family: Carabidae
- Genus: Pelecium
- Species: P. buckupi

Binomial name
- Pelecium buckupi Orsetti & Lopes-Andrade, 2024

= Pelecium buckupi =

Species of beetle

Pelecium buckupi is a species of beetle of the family Carabidae. It was formally described in 2024 and is named after the Brazilian researcher Ludwig Buckup. It is part of the P. punctatostriatum species group within its genus. Adults of this medium-sized species reach a length of about 12 mm (0.47 in) and have flat, elongate bodies. When viewed from above, they are metallic dark green and hairless, with purple reflections on the sides. The ventral side is shiny black. The legs and antennae are reddish-brown. The species is endemic to Goiás, Brazil, where it has only been collected from Serra da Mesa near Minaçu.

== Taxonomy ==
Pelecium buckupi was formally described in 2024 based on a male specimen collected from Serra da Mesa near Minaçu in Goiás, Brazil. The species is named after the Brazilian researcher Ludwig Buckup, one of the founders of the Fundação Zoobotânica do Rio Grande do Sul. It is part of the P. punctatostriatum species group within the genus.

== Description ==
Pelecium buckupi is a medium-sized species, with adults reaching a length of about 12 mm (0.47 in). They have flat and elongate bodies. The disc of the head, pronotum, and elytra are metallic dark green and hairless when viewed dorsally, with purple reflections along the sides. The ventral surface is shiny black. The antennae are short and reddish-brown. The legs are dark reddish-brown. The species can be distinguished from others in its genus by a combination the short and shallow frontal fovea of the head, a pronotum that is longer than it is wide, the fine and shallow median line of the pronotum deeper in the disc, and the punctiform posterior impressions of the pronotum surrounded by a shallow excavation.

P. bolivianum looks quite similar, but differs in the shape of the elytra and pronotum.
