= MQH =

MQH or mqh may refer to:

- MQH, the IATA code for Minaçu Airport, Brazil
- mqh, the ISO 639-3 code for Tlazoyaltepec Mixtec language, Oaxaca, Mexico
