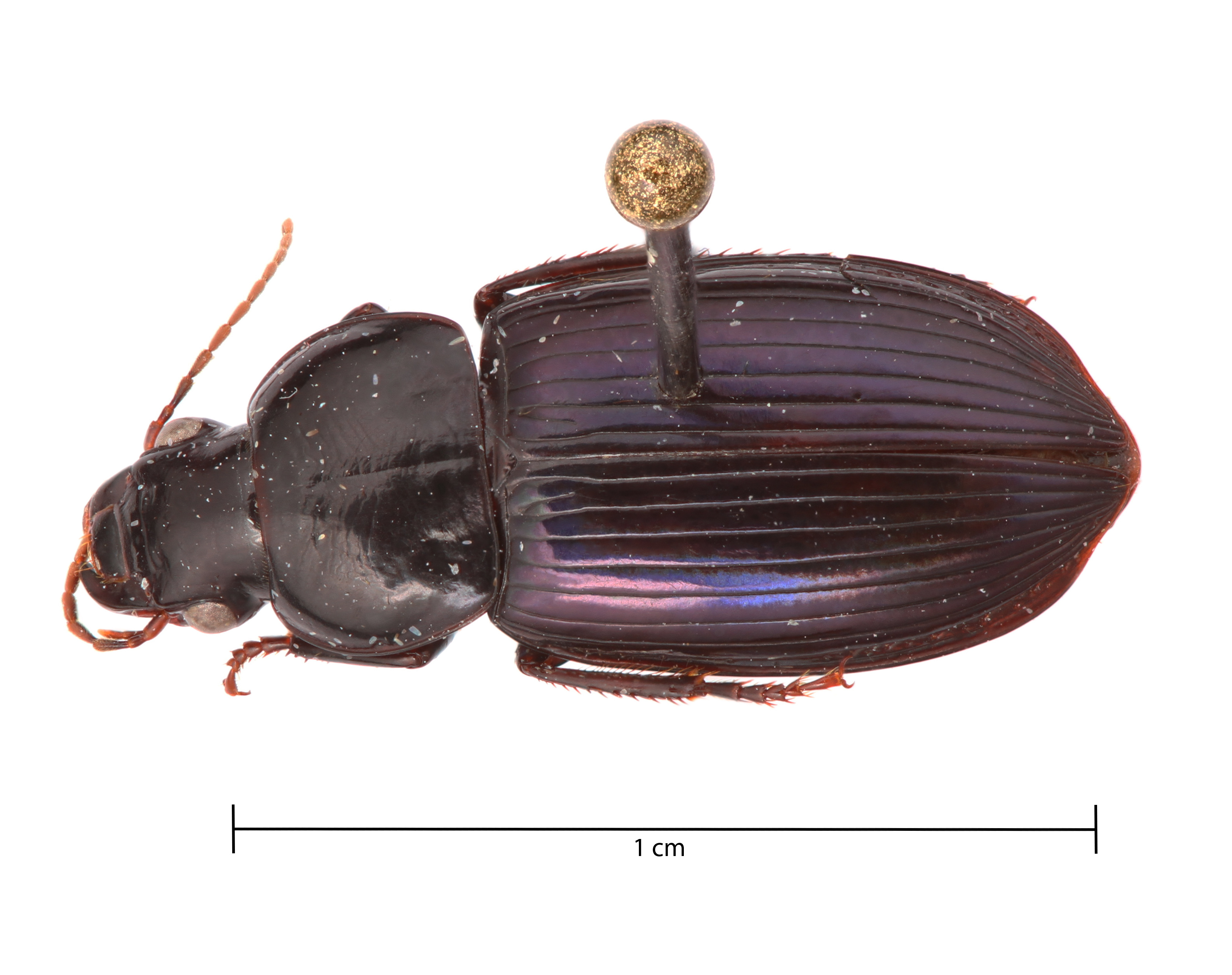
- Aztecarpalus schaefferi

Scientific classification
- Domain: Eukaryota
- Kingdom: Animalia
- Phylum: Arthropoda
- Class: Insecta
- Order: Coleoptera
- Suborder: Adephaga
- Family: Carabidae
- Subfamily: Harpalinae
- Tribe: Harpalini
- Subtribe: Harpalina
- Genus: Aztecarpalus; Ball, 1970

= Aztecarpalus =

Genus of beetles

Aztecarpalus is a genus of ground beetles in the family Carabidae. There are about nine described species in Aztecarpalus.

== Species ==
These nine species belong to the genus Aztecarpalus:

- Aztecarpalus hebescens (Bates, 1882)
- Aztecarpalus hemingi Ball, 1976
- Aztecarpalus lectoculus Ball, 1970
- Aztecarpalus liolus (Bates, 1882)
- Aztecarpalus marmoreus Ball, 1970
- Aztecarpalus platyderus (Bates, 1882)
- Aztecarpalus schaefferi Ball, 1970
- Aztecarpalus trochotrichis Ball, 1970
- Aztecarpalus whiteheadi Ball, 1976
