= Formoso =

- Municipality
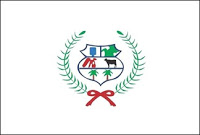
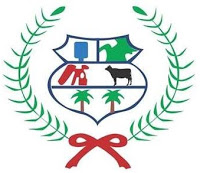
- Flag Coat of arms

- Location in Goiás state

- Location in Brazil
- Coordinates: 13°39′16″S 48°52′31″W
- Country: Brazil
- Region: Central-West
- State: Goiás
- Microregion: Porangatu Microregion

Area
  - Total: 844 km^{2} (326 sq mi)
- Elevation: 569 m (1,867 ft)

Population (2022)
  - Total: 4,660
  - Density: 5.52/km^{2} (14.3/sq mi)
- Time zone: UTC−3 (BRT)
- Postal code: 76470-000

Formoso is a municipality in north Goiás state, Brazil. The population was 4,660 (2022) in a total area of 844 km^{2} (326 sq mi).

Highway connections from Goiânia are made by GO-080 / Nerópolis / São Francisco de Goiás / BR-153 / Jaraguá / GO-080 / Goianésia / Barro Alto / GO-342 / BR-080 / BR-153 / Uruaçu / Santa Tereza de Goiás / GO-241.

Formoso is surrounded by the following municipalities:

- north: Santa Tereza de Goiás and Trombas
- east: Campinorte and Minaçu
- west: Estrela do Norte
- south: Campinorte and Mara Rosa

The economy is based on livestock raising, modest agriculture, small commerce, and government services. There was one bank in 2007. The main agricultural activities were cattle raising: 50,000 head (2006) and the growing of rice, sugarcane, manioc, corn, and banana (all fewer than 1,000 hectares). In 2006 there were 605 farms with 2,114 hectares of planted area. Pasture land made up 45,700 hectares. Approximately 2,000 people were employed in agriculture. Statistics are from IBGE

The literacy rate was 84.0% (2000) and the infant mortality rate was 24.07 in 1,000 live births. There were 7 schools and 1 hospital with 18 beds. The score on the Municipal Human Development Index was 0.737.

- State ranking: 119 (out of 242 municipalities in 2000)
- National ranking: 2,250 (out of 5,507 municipalities in 2000)

== See also ==
- List of municipalities in Goiás
