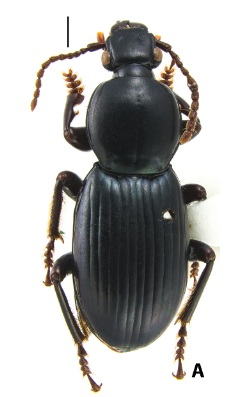

Scientific classification
- Kingdom: Animalia
- Phylum: Arthropoda
- Clade: Pancrustacea
- Class: Insecta
- Order: Coleoptera
- Suborder: Adephaga
- Family: Carabidae
- Genus: Pelecium
- Species: P. balli

Binomial name
- Pelecium balli Orsetti & Lopes-Andrade, 2024

= Pelecium balli =

Species of beetle

Pelecium balli is a species of beetle in the family Carabidae. It was formally described in 2024 and is named after the American entomologist George Eugene Ball. It is part of the P. rotundipenne species group within its genus. Adults of this mediums-zed species reach a length of about 10 mm (0.39 in) and have flat, elongate bodies. When viewed from above, they are shiny black and hairless, while the ventral side is shiny black. The legs are dark reddish-brown. The species is endemic to Paraná, Brazil, where it has only been collected from near São Luiz do Purunã.

== Taxonomy ==
Pelecium balli was formally described in 2024 based on a female specimen collected from near São Luiz do Purunã in Paraná, Brazil. The species is named after the American entomologist George Eugene Ball, an expert in carabid ground beetles who was also co-author of a taxonomic revision of the genus Pelecium. It is part of the P. rotundipenne species group within the genus.

== Description ==
Pelecium balli is a medium-sized species, with adults reaching a length of about 10 mm (0.39 in). They have elongate and flat bodies. The disc of the head, pronotum and elytra are shiny black and hairless when viewed dorsally, while the ventral surface is shiny black. Sternite V has a mesh of fine yellow setae. The legs are dark reddish-brown. The species can be distinguished from others in its genus by a combination of its elongate body, punctiform frontal fovea of the head, fine and shallow median line of the pronotum, and the deeply impressed striae 1–5 and shallow stria six on each elytron.

P. paulae looks quite similar, but has a shallow and rounded pronotum posterior impression, compared to the shallow and line-shaped pronotum posterior impression of P. balli.
