= Alto Horizonte =

- Municipality
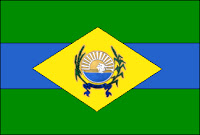
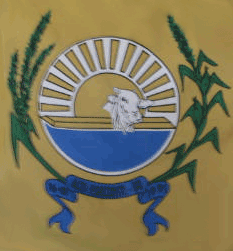
- Flag Coat of arms

- Location in Goiás state

- Location in Brazil
- Coordinates: 14°11′44″S 49°20′08″W
- Country: Brazil
- Region: Central-West
- State: Goiás
- Microregion: Porangatu Microregion

Area
  - Total: 503.7 km^{2} (194.5 sq mi)
- Elevation: 375 m (1,230 ft)

Population (2020)
  - Total: 6,605
  - Density: 13.11/km^{2} (33.96/sq mi)
- Time zone: UTC−3 (BRT)
- Postal code: 76560-000

Alto Horizonte is a municipality in north Goiás state, Brazil. The population was 6,605 in 2020 and the area of the municipality was 503.7 km^{2} (194.5 sq mi).

== Location ==
Alto Horizonte is located about 341 kilometers north of the state capital, Goiânia and is in the Porangatu Microregion. Municipal boundaries are with:

- north: Mara Rosa
- south and east: Nova Iguaçu de Goiás
- west: Campinorte

Alto Horizonte is connected by poor roads to Campinorte, which is on the Belém-Brasília highway. Mara Rosa is 32 kilometers to the north and Nova Iguaçu de Goiás is 12 kilometers to the south. All highway connections are of poor quality.

Highway access from Goiânia is made by GO-080 / Nerópolis / BR-153 / Jaraguá / GO-080 / Goianésia / Barro Alto / GO-342 / Uruaçu / Campinorte / GO-428 / GO-556. See Seplan

== History ==
In 1949 Manoel Francisco Leite bought lands in the region and in 1951 built the first "rancho" (hut). In 1952 he began to distribute lots to new settlers. The first name was Chapada Grande. In 1991 it was emancipated from the municipality of Mara Rosa with the new name of Alto Horizonte, inspired by the beauty of the location and the new horizons for the inhabitants.

Demographics

- The population growth rate 2000/2007 was 2.92%. In 2007 the urban population was 2,442 while the rural population was 694.

== The economy ==
The main economic activities are cattle raising (40,000 head in 2006) and plantations of rice (500 hectares), manioc, and corn (600 hectares). In 2006 there were 196 farms with a total area of 31,812 hectares, of which 748 hectares were planted, 22,216 hectares were pasture, and 8,136 hectares were woodland. Farms employed 100 people in 2005 and there were 497 workers related to the producer.

- Banking establishment: none in 2007
- Industrial units: 07 in 2007
- Retail units: 37 in 2007
- Motor vehicles: 246 automobiles (2007)

== Health and education ==
The infant mortality rate in 2000 was 24.07 while the literacy rate was 86.1. There were two schools with 921 students.

The score on the Municipal Human Development Index was 0.743

- State ranking: 97 (out of 242 municipalities)
- National ranking: 2,075 (out of 5,507 municipalities)

== See also ==
- List of municipalities in Goiás
- Microregions of Goiás
