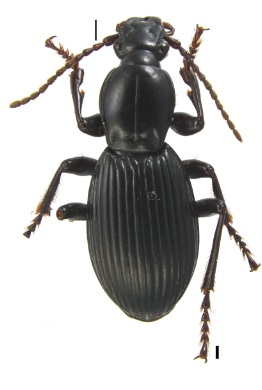

Scientific classification
- Kingdom: Animalia
- Phylum: Arthropoda
- Clade: Pancrustacea
- Class: Insecta
- Order: Coleoptera
- Suborder: Adephaga
- Family: Carabidae
- Genus: Pelecium
- Species: P. grossii

Binomial name
- Pelecium grossii Orsetti & Lopes-Andrade, 2024

= Pelecium grossii =

Species of beetle

Pelecium grossii is a species of beetle of the family Carabidae. It was formally described in 2024 and is named after the Brazilian coleopterist Paschoal Coelho Grossi. It is part of the P. violaceum species group within its genus. Adults of this medium-sized species reach a length of about 15 mm (0.59 in) and have flat, elongate bodies. When viewed from above, they are shiny black and hairless, while the ventral side is shiny black. The legs and antennae are reddish-brown. The species is endemic to Paraná, Brazil, where it has only been collected from Capitão Leônidas Marques.

== Taxonomy ==
Pelecium grossii was formally described in 2024 based on a male specimen collected from Capitão Leônidas Marques in Paraná, Brazil. The species is named after the Brazilian coleopterist Paschoal Coelho Grossi, who loaned the authors describing the species specimens of beetles important for their research. It is part of the P. violaceum species group within the genus.

== Description ==
Pelecium grossii is a medium-sized species, with adults reaching a length of about 15 mm (0.59 in). They have flat and elongate bodies. The head, pronotum, and elytra are shiny black and hairless when viewed dorsally. The ventral surface is shiny black. The antennae are long and reddish-brown, reaching the elytra. The legs are dark reddish-brown. The species can be distinguished from others in its genus by a combination of its extended head fovea reaching the plane of the eyes, the long and deep median line of the pronotum with deep posterior impressions, and flat, elongate elytra with eight deeply impressed striae.

P. violaceum looks quite similar, but has large eyes and bright purplish dorsal sides, compared P. grossii, which has small eyes and no bright color on the dorsum.
