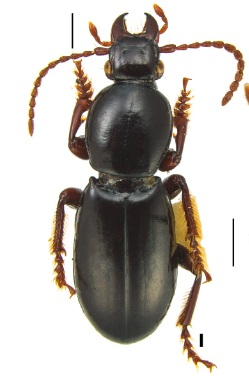

Scientific classification
- Kingdom: Animalia
- Phylum: Arthropoda
- Clade: Pancrustacea
- Class: Insecta
- Order: Coleoptera
- Suborder: Adephaga
- Family: Carabidae
- Genus: Pelecium
- Species: P. laeve

Binomial name
- Pelecium laeve Chaudoir, 1854

Synonyms
- Pelecium politum Schaum, 1860

= Pelecium laeve =

Species of beetle

Pelecium laeve is a species of beetle of the family Carabidae. This species is found in Brazil (Rio de Janeiro, Rio Grande do Sul, Paraná).
