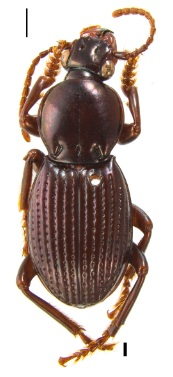

Scientific classification
- Kingdom: Animalia
- Phylum: Arthropoda
- Clade: Pancrustacea
- Class: Insecta
- Order: Coleoptera
- Suborder: Adephaga
- Family: Carabidae
- Genus: Pelecium
- Species: P. zaguryi

Binomial name
- Pelecium zaguryi Orsetti & Lopes-Andrade, 2024

= Pelecium zaguryi =

Species of beetle

Pelecium zaguryi is a species of beetle of the family Carabidae. It was formally described in 2024 and is named after the Brazilian coleopterist Fernando Zagury Vaz de Mello. It is part of the P. punctatostriatum species group within its genus. Adults of this medium-sized species reach a length of about 10 mm (0.39 in) and have flat, elongate bodies. The beetle is entirely dark reddish-brown in color. The species is endemic to Mato Grosso, Brazil, where it has only been collected from the Fazenda São Nicolau.

== Taxonomy ==
Pelecium zaguryi was formally described in 2024 based on a female specimen collected from the Fazenda São Nicolau in Mato Grosso, Brazil. The species is named after the Brazilian coleopterist Fernando Zagury Vaz de Mello, who loaned the authors describing the species specimens of beetles important for their research. It is part of the P. punctatostriatum species group within the genus.

== Description ==
Pelecium zaguryi is a medium-sized species, with adults reaching a length of about 10 mm (0.39 in). They have flat and elongate bodies. The head, pronotum, and elytra are dark reddish-brown and hairless when viewed dorsally. The ventral surface and legs are also dark reddish-brown. The antennae are long and reddish-brown. The species can be distinguished from others in its genus by a combination of its short and deep fovea of the head, the short pronotum with three pairs of marginal setae, a shallow median line of the pronotum, and deep posterior impressions, and long, oval elytra with punctate striae.

P. rotundipenne looks quite similar, but in that species, tarsomere 5 is hairless ventrally, compared to P. zaguryi, in which tarsomeres 5 bear a row of a few slender setae on each ventral margin.
