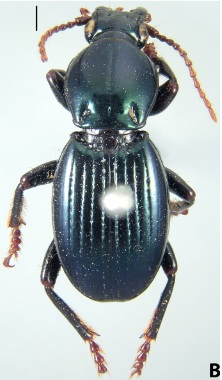

Scientific classification
- Kingdom: Animalia
- Phylum: Arthropoda
- Clade: Pancrustacea
- Class: Insecta
- Order: Coleoptera
- Suborder: Adephaga
- Family: Carabidae
- Genus: Pelecium
- Species: P. semistriatum

Binomial name
- Pelecium semistriatum Straneo & Ball, 1989

= Pelecium semistriatum =

Species of beetle

Pelecium semistriatum is a species of beetle of the family Carabidae. This species is found in Brazil.
