= Santa Terezinha de Goiás =

- Municipality
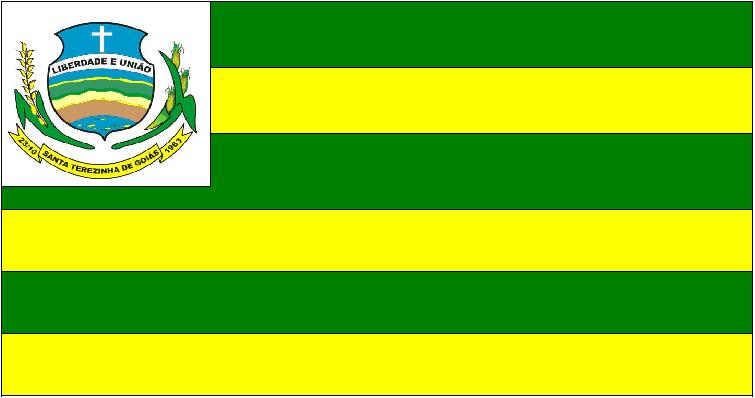
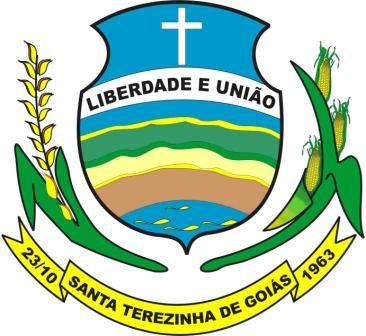
- Flag Coat of arms

- Location in Goiás state

- Location in Brazil
- Coordinates: 14°26′00″S 49°41′44″W
- Country: Brazil
- Region: Central-West
- State: Goiás
- Microregion: Porangatu Microregion

Area
  - Total: 1,202.2 km^{2} (464.2 sq mi)
- Elevation: 409 m (1,342 ft)

Population (2020)
  - Total: 10,645
  - Density: 8.8546/km^{2} (22.933/sq mi)
- Time zone: UTC−3 (BRT)
- Postal code: 76500-000

Santa Terezinha de Goiás is a municipality in the Porangatu Microregion of the state of Goiás, Brazil. Santa Terezinha is sometimes written as "Santa Teresinha".

== Location ==
Santa Terezinha is located in north of the state, 174 km southwest of Porangatu. It is 66 km west of the important BR-153 highway.

Highway connections from Goiânia are made by GO-080 / Nerópolis / São Francisco de Goiás / BR-153 / Jaraguá / Rianápolis / Rialma / GO-336 / Itapaci / GO-154 / Pilar de Goiás.

Santa Terezinha de Goiás is bordered by the following municipalities: Campos Verdes de Goiás and Mara Rosa to the north, Uruaçu to the east, Guarinos to the south and Crixás to the west.

== History ==
The municipality was first settled in 1953 by the Batista Ferreira family hailing from Anápolis. At that time, the region of modern-day Santa Terezinha de Goiás belonged to the municipality of Pilar de Goiás, and was only emancipated on January 1st, 1964.

The origin of the name is attributed to the family's patron saint Thérèse of Lisieux, a very popular saint in 20th century Brazil.

== Demographics ==
- Population density: 8.82 inhabitants/km^{2} (2022)
- Urban population: 7,896 (2022)
- Rural population: 2,749 (2022)
- Population change (2007–2022): −7.9%

== Economy ==
In 2021, the Gross Domestic Product of Santa Terezinha de Goiás was R$ 190.87 million.

The municipal economy is based mostly on the tertiary sector, with private services being responsible for R$ 78.47 million and public administration R$ 47.41 million. Agriculture is the second-largest source at R$ 44.73 million, consisting mainly of cattle ranching, while industry generates a lesser R$ 6.12 million.

In 2023, the GDP per capita was R$24,415.91, placing the municipality 216th in Goiás and 3282nd in Brazil.

In 2024, Santa Terezinha recorded R$75.1 million in revenue and R$75.0 million in total expenditure.

== Education ==
As of 2025, the municipality had eight elementary schools and one secondary school, with 1,283 students enrolled in elementary education and 266 in secondary education.

In 2022, the school enrollment rate for children aged 6 to 14 was 92.51%. The municipality ranked 243rd of 246 municipalities in Goiás and 5,506th of 5,570 municipalities nationwide on this indicator.

== Health ==
As of 2009, the municipality had six public health facilities (Unified Health System).

In 2023, the infant mortality rate was 45.45 deaths per 1,000 live births. This was the 6th-highest rate among the 246 municipalities in Goiás, the 125th-highest nationally, and the highest among the 23 municipalities in its immediate geographic region.

In 2024, the rate of hospitalizations for diarrhea treated through the Unified Health System (SUS) was 37.0 per 100,000 inhabitants.

== See also ==
- List of municipalities in Goiás
- Microregions of Goiás
