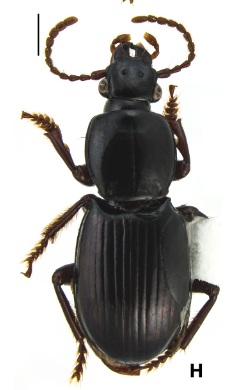

Scientific classification
- Kingdom: Animalia
- Phylum: Arthropoda
- Clade: Pancrustacea
- Class: Insecta
- Order: Coleoptera
- Suborder: Adephaga
- Family: Carabidae
- Genus: Pelecium
- Species: P. chrissquirei

Binomial name
- Pelecium chrissquirei Orsetti & Lopes-Andrade, 2024

= Pelecium chrissquirei =

Species of beetle

Pelecium chrissquirei is a species of beetle of the family Carabidae. It was formally described in 2024 and is named after the British musician Chris Squire, the bassist of the prog rock band Yes. It is part of the P. rotundipenne species group within its genus. Adults of this small species reach a length of about 7 mm (0.28 in) and have flat, ovular bodies. When viewed from above, they are black and hairless, with light metallic green reflections along the sides. The ventral side is shiny black. The legs and antennae are reddish-brown. The species is endemic to Minas Gerais, Brazil, where it has only been collected from Caparaó National Park.

== Taxonomy ==
Pelecium chrissquirei was formally described in 2024 based on a male specimen collected from Caparaó National Park in Minas Gerais, Brazil. The species is named after the British musician Chris Squire, the bassist of the prog rock band Yes. It is part of the P. rotundipenne species group within the genus.

== Description ==
Pelecium chrissquirei is a small species, with adults reaching a length of about 7 mm (0.28 in). They have flat and ovular bodies. The disc of the head, pronotum, and elytra are black and hairless when viewed dorsally, with light metallic green reflections along the sides. The ventral surface is shiny black. The antennae are moderately long and reddish-brown. The legs are reddish-brown. The species can be distinguished from others in its genus by a combination of the punctiform frontal fovea of the head surrounded by short excavations, the shallow median line of the pronotum with a shallow posterior impressions curving towards the centre, and the deeply impressed striae 1–5 and shallow stria 6 on each elytron.

P. helenae looks quite similar, but differs in the form of its pronotal posterior impression and the shape of the male maxillary palpomere 4.
