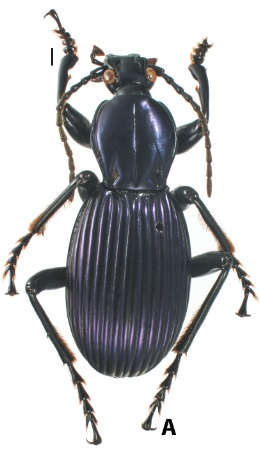

Scientific classification
- Kingdom: Animalia
- Phylum: Arthropoda
- Clade: Pancrustacea
- Class: Insecta
- Order: Coleoptera
- Suborder: Adephaga
- Family: Carabidae
- Genus: Pelecium
- Species: P. violaceum

Binomial name
- Pelecium violaceum Brullé, 1838

= Pelecium violaceum =

Species of beetle

Pelecium violaceum is a species of beetle of the family Carabidae. This species is found in Bolivia, Paraguay, central Argentina and Brazil (Rondônia, Mato Grosso, Goiás, São Paulo).
