= Mutunópolis =

- Municipality
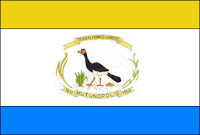
- Flag

- Location in Goiás state

- Location in Brazil
- Coordinates: 13°43′51″S 49°16′12″W
- Country: Brazil
- Region: Central-West
- State: Goiás
- Microregion: Porangatu Microregion

Area
  - Total: 869 km^{2} (336 sq mi)
- Elevation: 413 m (1,355 ft)

Population (2020)
  - Total: 3,764
  - Density: 4.33/km^{2} (11.2/sq mi)
- Time zone: UTC−3 (BRT)
- Postal code: 76540-000

Mutunópolis is a municipality in north Goiás state, Brazil.

== Location ==
Mutunópolis is located in the extreme north of the state, 38 km south of the important regional center of Porangatu. It is 24 km northwest of the BR-153 highway, to which it is linked by a paved road.

- Distance to Goiânia: 393 km
- Distance to Porangatu: 38 km

Highway connections from Goiânia are made by GO-080 / Nerópolis / São Francisco de Goiás / BR-153 / Jaraguá / GO-080 / Goianésia / GO-342 / Barro Alto / BR-153 / Uruaçu / Estrela do Norte / GO-241.

Mutunópolis is surrounded by the following municipalities:

- north and west: Porangatu
- east: Santa Tereza de Goiás
- south: Amaralina

== History ==
The origin of this town began in 1950 when the founder, João Gonçalves Pacheco, arrived looking for fertile lands to cultivate. The first name was "Mutum", the name of a local bird. In 1931 it was elevated to district in the municipality of Porangatu, altering the name to Mutunópolis, city of the "mutum". In 1958 it was dismembered from Porangatu.

== Political information ==
In January 2005 the Mayor was Luiz Martins de Oliveira and the Vice-mayor was Maria Vaz de Carvalho. There were 9 councilmembers on the city council and the number of eligible voters was 3,129 (2007).

== Demographic information ==
In 2007 the population density was 4,55 inhabitants/km^{2}. According to the 2007 count, 2,682 were urban and 1,272 were rural. The population has been declining since 1980 when it was 5,157. From 1996 to 2007 the geometric growth rate was -0.85%. Most of the population decrease has been in the rural area but few have gone to the urban area, preferring to look for better opportunities in the more developed southern region of the state.

== Economic information ==
The economy was based on modest agriculture, cattle raising, services, public employment, and small transformation industries. In 2005 there were only 3 industrial units listed and 28 retail units. There were no financial institutions. The largest employer was public administration with 156 workers. In 2007 there were 226 automobiles, 15 trucks, 56 pickup trucks, and 366 motorcycles.

In 2005 there were 75,500 head of cattle. Poultry and swine production was on a modest scale. Agricultural production was limited with the main crops being rice, corn, manioc, bananas, and soybeans. No crop exceeded 1,000 hectares of planted area.

== Agricultural Census (2006) ==
- Farms: 512
- Planted area: 1,840 hectares
- Natural Pasture: 53,300 hectares
- Woodland and Forest: 23,435 hectares
- Persons occupied related to the farm owner: 1,202
- Persons occupied not related to the farm owner: 264 (IBGE)

== Health and education ==
In 2007 there was 1 hospital with 19 beds and 5 walk-in health clinics. The infant mortality rate in 2000 was 21.69 deaths in every 1,000 live births, well below the national average of 35.0.

In 2006 the school system had 6 schools with 1,122 students. There was 1 middle school and 0 institutions of higher learning. The adult literacy rate was 80.4%, below the national average of 86.4%.

== Municipal Human Development Index ==
Mutunópolis is ranked 168 out of 242 municipalities on the MHDI-M.

- MHDI: 0.722
- State ranking: 168 (out of 242 municipalities)
- National ranking: 2,592 (out of 5,507 municipalities)

== Index of Economic Development (Seplan 2001) ==
- 211/246 municipalities. See Seplan

== Index of Social Development (Seplan 2000) ==
- 196/246 municipalities. See Seplan

== See also ==
- List of municipalities in Goiás
