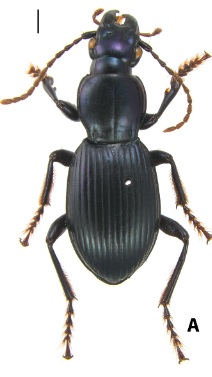

Scientific classification
- Kingdom: Animalia
- Phylum: Arthropoda
- Clade: Pancrustacea
- Class: Insecta
- Order: Coleoptera
- Suborder: Adephaga
- Family: Carabidae
- Genus: Pelecium
- Species: P. zophos

Binomial name
- Pelecium zophos Orsetti & Lopes-Andrade, 2024

= Pelecium zophos =

Species of beetle

Pelecium zophos is a species of beetle of the family Carabidae. It was formally described in 2024 and is named after its the dark dorsum. It is part of the P. violaceum species group within its genus. Adults of this medium-sized species reach a length of about 13 mm (0.51 in) and have flat, ovular bodies. When viewed from above, they are shiny black and hairless, with purple and green reflections on the sides. The ventral side is shiny black. The legs and antennae are reddish-brown. The species is endemic to Rio de Janeiro, Brazil, where it has only been collected from Teresópolis and Itatiaia National Park.

== Taxonomy ==
Pelecium zophos was formally described in 2024 based on a male specimen collected from Teresópolis in Rio de Janeiro, Brazil. The specific epithet is derived from the Greek word zophos, meaning darkness, and refers to the dark dorsum of the species. It is part of the P. violaceum species group within the genus.

== Description ==
Pelecium zophos is a medium-sized species, with adults reaching a length of about 13 mm (0.51 in). They have flat and ovular bodies. The disc of the head, pronotum, and elytra are shiny black and hairless when viewed dorsally, with light metallic purplish reflections along the sides. The antennae are long and reddish-brown. The legs are dark reddish-brown. The species can be distinguished from others in its genus by a combination of its short and deep fovea of the head, the elongated pronotum with a shallow median line and deep posterior impressions, and elongate, oval elytra with eight deeply impressed striae.

P. cyanipes looks quite similar, but in that species, tarsomere 5 is hairless ventrally, compared to P. zophos, in which tarsomeres 5 bear a row of a few slender setae on each ventral margin.
