= Microregion of Porangatu =

Coordinates: 13°26′27″S 49°08′56″W

Porangatu
- Microregion
- Location in Goias state
- Country: Brazil
- State: Goiás
- Mesoregion: Norte Goiano
- Municipalities: 19

Area
  - Total: 35,287 km^{2} (13,624 sq mi)

Population (2007)
  - Total: 220,794
  - Density: 6.2571/km^{2} (16.206/sq mi)

The Porangatu Microregion is a statistical region created by IBGE (Instituto Brasileiro de Geografia e Economia) in north-central Goiás state, Brazil. The most important city is Porangatu.

== Municipalities ==
The microregion consists of the following municipalities:

- Alto Horizonte
- Amaralina
- Bonópolis
- Campinaçu
- Campinorte
- Campos Verdes
- Estrela do Norte
- Formoso
- Mara Rosa
- Minaçu
- Montividiu do Norte
- Mutunópolis
- Niquelândia
- Nova Iguaçu de Goiás
- Porangatu
- Santa Tereza de Goiás
- Santa Terezinha de Goiás
- Trombas
- Uruaçu

== See also ==
- List of municipalities in Goiás
- Microregions of Goiás
