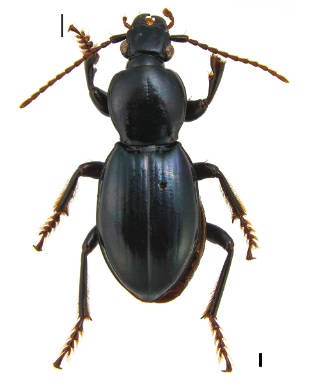

Scientific classification
- Kingdom: Animalia
- Phylum: Arthropoda
- Clade: Pancrustacea
- Class: Insecta
- Order: Coleoptera
- Suborder: Adephaga
- Family: Carabidae
- Genus: Pelecium
- Species: P. belloi

Binomial name
- Pelecium belloi Orsetti & Lopes-Andrade, 2024

= Pelecium belloi =

Species of beetle

Pelecium belloi is a species of beetle of the family Carabidae. It was formally described in 2024 and is named after the Brazilian coleopterist Ayr de Moura Bello. It is part of the P. laeve species group within its genus. Adults of this medium-sized species reach a length of about 10 mm (0.39 in) and have flat, ovular bodies. When viewed from above, they are shiny black and hairless, with purple and green reflections on the sides. The ventral side is shiny black. The legs and antennae are reddish-brown. The species is endemic to São Paulo, Brazil, where it has only been collected from the Serra do Mar State Park.

== Taxonomy ==
Pelecium belloi was formally described in 2024 based on a female specimen collected from the Serra do Mar State Park in São Paulo, Brazil. The species is named after the Brazilian coleopterist Ayr de Moura Bello, who loaned the authors describing the species specimens of beetles important for their research. It is part of the P. laeve species group within the genus.

== Description ==
Pelecium belloi is a medium-sized species, with adults reaching a length of about 10 mm (0.39 in). They have flat and ovular bodies. The disc of the head, pronotum, and elytra are shiny black and hairless when viewed dorsally, with purple and green reflections on the sides. The ventral surface is shiny black. The antennae are long and reddish-brown. The legs are dark reddish-brown. The species can be distinguished from others in its genus by a combination of its punctiform frontal fovea of the head, the fine and shallow median line of the pronotum with shallow and inconspicuous posterior impressions, and oval elytra with no deeply impressed striae.

P. laeve looks quite similar, but has a elongate and slender pronotum with sides equally arcuate throughout their lengths, compared to the pronotum of P. belloi, which is slightly wider than it is long, with sides arcuate and shortly subsinuate posteriorly.
