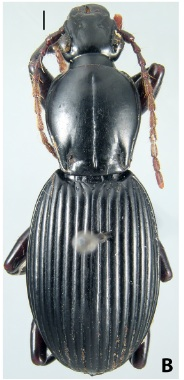

Scientific classification
- Kingdom: Animalia
- Phylum: Arthropoda
- Clade: Pancrustacea
- Class: Insecta
- Order: Coleoptera
- Suborder: Adephaga
- Family: Carabidae
- Genus: Pelecium
- Species: P. longicolle

Binomial name
- Pelecium longicolle Straneo, 1953

= Pelecium longicolle =

Species of beetle

Pelecium longicolle is a species of beetle of the family Carabidae. This species is found in Brazil and Paraguay.

== Subspecies ==
- Pelecium longicolle longicolle (Brazil)
- Pelecium longicolle impunctatum Straneo & Ball, 1989 (Paraguay)
