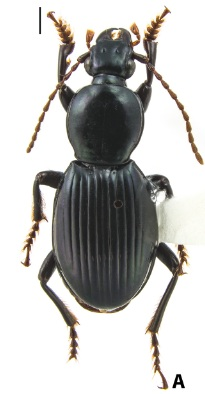

Scientific classification
- Kingdom: Animalia
- Phylum: Arthropoda
- Clade: Pancrustacea
- Class: Insecta
- Order: Coleoptera
- Suborder: Adephaga
- Family: Carabidae
- Genus: Pelecium
- Species: P. straneoi

Binomial name
- Pelecium straneoi Orsetti & Lopes-Andrade, 2024

= Pelecium straneoi =

Species of beetle

Pelecium straneoi is a species of beetle of the family Carabidae. It was formally described in 2024 and is named after the Italian coleopterist Stefano Ludovico Straneo. It is part of the P. rotundipenne species group within its genus. Adults of this medium-sized species reach a length of about 10 mm (0.39 in) and have flat, ovular bodies. When viewed from above, they are shiny black and hairless, while the ventral side is shiny black. The legs and antennae are reddish-brown. The species is endemic to São Paulo, Brazil, where it has only been collected from the Serra do Mar State Park.

== Taxonomy ==
Pelecium straneoi was formally described in 2024 based on a female specimen collected from the Serra do Mar State Park in São Paulo, Brazil. The species is named after the Italian coleopterist Stefano Ludovico Straneo, and expert in carabid ground beetles who contributed greatly to the taxonomy of the genus Pelecium. It is part of the P. rotundipenne species group within the genus.

== Description ==
Pelecium straneoi is a medium-sized species, with adults reaching a length of about 10 mm (0.39 in). They have flat and ovular bodies. The disc of the head, pronotum, and elytra are shiny black and hairless when viewed dorsally, while the ventral surface is shiny black. The antennae are long and reddish-brown. The legs are dark reddish-brown. Females only differ from males in having a mesh of long yellow setae on basal region of tergite V. The species can be distinguished from others in its genus by a combination of its punctiform frontal fovea of the head, the rounded lateral margins of the pronotum, the fine and shallow median line of the pronotum with shallow and inconspicuous posterior impressions, and striae 1 through 6 deeply impressed on each elytron.

P. paulae looks quite similar, but has more distinct posterior impressions of the pronotum.
