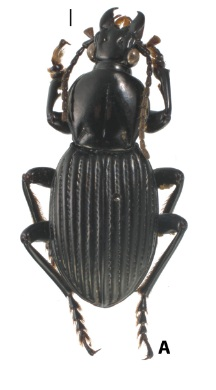

Scientific classification
- Kingdom: Animalia
- Phylum: Arthropoda
- Clade: Pancrustacea
- Class: Insecta
- Order: Coleoptera
- Suborder: Adephaga
- Family: Carabidae
- Genus: Pelecium
- Species: P. fistulosus

Binomial name
- Pelecium fistulosus Orsetti & Lopes-Andrade, 2024

= Pelecium fistulosus =

Species of beetle

Pelecium fistulosus is a species of beetle of the family Carabidae. It was formally described in 2024 and is named after its punctate elytral striae. It is part of the P. punctatostriatum species group within its genus. Adults of this large species reach a length of about 16 mm (0.63 in) and have flat, elongate bodies. When viewed from above, they are hairless and shiny black. The ventral side is shiny black. The long, reddish-brown antennae reach the front of the elytra. The legs are black. The species is endemic to Mato Grosso, Brazil, where it has only been collected from Cristalino State Park.

== Taxonomy ==
Pelecium fistulosus was formally described in 2024 based on a female specimen collected from Cristalino State Park in Mato Grosso, Brazil. The specific epithet is derived from the Latin fistulosus, meaning "full of holes", referring to the punctate elytral striae. It is part of the P. punctatostriatum species group within the genus.

== Description ==
Pelecium fistulosus is a large species, with adults reaching a length of about 16 mm (0.63 in). They have a flat and elongate body. The disc of the head, pronotum, and elytra are shiny black and hairless. The ventral surface is shiny black. The antennae are long and reddish-brown, reaching to the front of the elytra. The legs are black. The species can be distinguished from others in its genus by a combination of its short and deeply impressed fovea of the head, the long and deep median line of the pronotum with deep posterior impressions, and long, oval elytra with seven deeply impressed and punctate striae.

P. punctatostriatum looks quite similar, but has a pronotum that is longer than it is wide and 5 deeply impressed striae on each elytron, compared to P. fistulosus, which has a pronotum is wider than it is long and 5 deeply impressed striae on each elytron.
