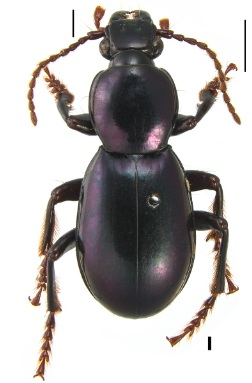

Scientific classification
- Kingdom: Animalia
- Phylum: Arthropoda
- Clade: Pancrustacea
- Class: Insecta
- Order: Coleoptera
- Suborder: Adephaga
- Family: Carabidae
- Genus: Pelecium
- Species: P. nicki

Binomial name
- Pelecium nicki Straneo, 1955

= Pelecium nicki =

Species of beetle

Pelecium nicki is a species of beetle of the family Carabidae. This species is found in Brazil (Paraná, Santa Catarina).
