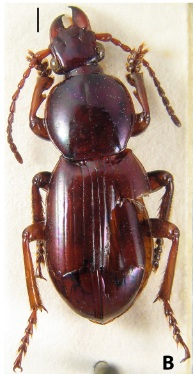

Scientific classification
- Kingdom: Animalia
- Phylum: Arthropoda
- Clade: Pancrustacea
- Class: Insecta
- Order: Coleoptera
- Suborder: Adephaga
- Family: Carabidae
- Genus: Pelecium
- Species: P. obtusum

Binomial name
- Pelecium obtusum Straneo, 1953

= Pelecium obtusum =

Species of beetle

Pelecium obtusum is a species of beetle of the family Carabidae. This species is found in Brazil.
