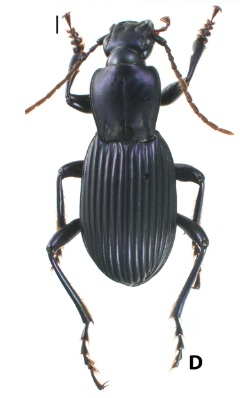

Scientific classification
- Kingdom: Animalia
- Phylum: Arthropoda
- Clade: Pancrustacea
- Class: Insecta
- Order: Coleoptera
- Suborder: Adephaga
- Family: Carabidae
- Genus: Pelecium
- Species: P. cyanipes

Binomial name
- Pelecium cyanipes Kirby, 1817

Synonyms
- Pelecium humeratum Chaudoir, 1866; Pelecium ovipenne Chaudoir, 1861; Pelecium carinatum Chaudoir, 1846

= Pelecium cyanipes =

Species of beetle

Pelecium cyanipes is a species of beetle of the family Carabidae. This species is found in Brazil (Rio de Janeiro, Minas Gerais).
