= Santa Tereza de Goiás =

- Municipality
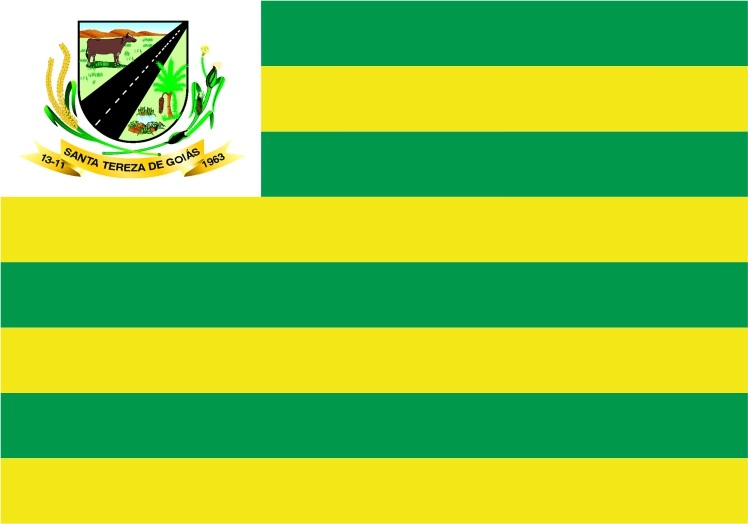
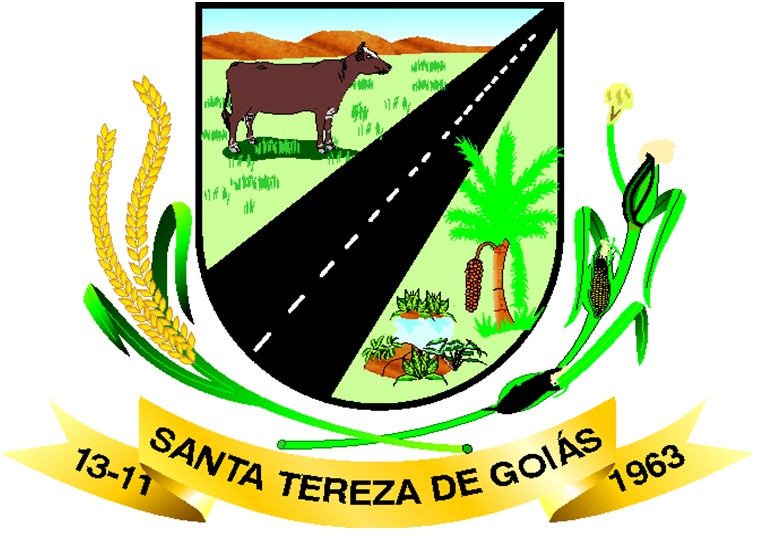
- Flag Coat of arms

- Location in Goiás state

- Location in Brazil
- Coordinates: 13°42′55″S 49°00′40″W
- Country: Brazil
- Region: Central-West
- State: Goiás
- Microregion: Porangatu Microregion

Area
  - Total: 794.5 km^{2} (306.8 sq mi)
- Elevation: 409 m (1,342 ft)

Population (2025)
  - Total: 3.172
  - Density: 0.003992/km^{2} (0.01034/sq mi)
- Time zone: UTC−3 (BRT)
- Postal code: 75455-000

Santa Tereza de Goias is a municipality in north Goiás state, Brazil. Santa Tereza de Goiás is often spelled "Santa Teresa de Goiás".

== Location ==
Santa Tereza is located in the extreme north of the state 35 km. south of Porangatu. It is on the important BR-153 highway. Highway connections starting in Goiânia are made by GO-080 / Nerópolis / São Francisco de Goiás / BR-153 / Jaraguá / GO-080 / Goianésia / Barro Alto / GO-342 / BR-080 / BR-153 / Uruaçu / Campinorte.

Santa Tereza de Goiás is surrounded by the following municipalities:

- north: Porangatu and Trombas
- south: Campinorte and Formoso
- east: Minaçu
- west: Mutunópolis

== Political and Demographic Information ==
The mayor was Paulo Vieira da Costa (January 2005) and there were 9 members on the city council. The number of eligible voters was 3,238 (December/2007). The population density was 5,22 inhabitants/km^{2} (2007). The urban population was 3,475 and the rural population was 670 (2007).

- Population growth: -2,03% 1996/2007

== Economic Information ==
The economy is based on subsistence agriculture, cattle raising, services, public administration, and small transformation industries.

- Industrial units: 1 (2007)
- Commercial units: 53 (2007)
- Automobiles: 293 (2007)
- Farms: 243 (2006)
- Permanent and Temporary Planted Area: 963 hectares
- Natural Pasture: 36,632 hectares
- Woodland and Forest: 15,847 hectares
- Workers related to the farm owner: 367
- Workers not related to the farm owner: 161 (IBGE)
- Cattle herd: 58,000 head (2006)
- Main crops: rice (700 hectares), bananas, beans, manioc, corn (600 hectares), and soybeans.

== Quality of Life ==
In 2006 there were 6 schools and 1 hospital with 17 beds. The adult literacy rate was 84.7% (2000) (national average was 86.4%) and the infant mortality rate was 31.85 (2000) (national average was 33).

All data are from IBGE

Municipal Human Development Index: 0.729 (2000)

- State ranking: 150 (out of 242 municipalities)
- National ranking: 2,460 (out of 5,507 municipalities)

Seplan Economic Development Index

- The ranking was 192 out of 246 municipalities

Seplan Social Development Index

- The ranking was 183 out of 246 municipalities

== See also ==
- List of municipalities in Goiás
- Microregions of Goiás
