= Uirapuru, Goiás =

Uirapuru
- Municipality
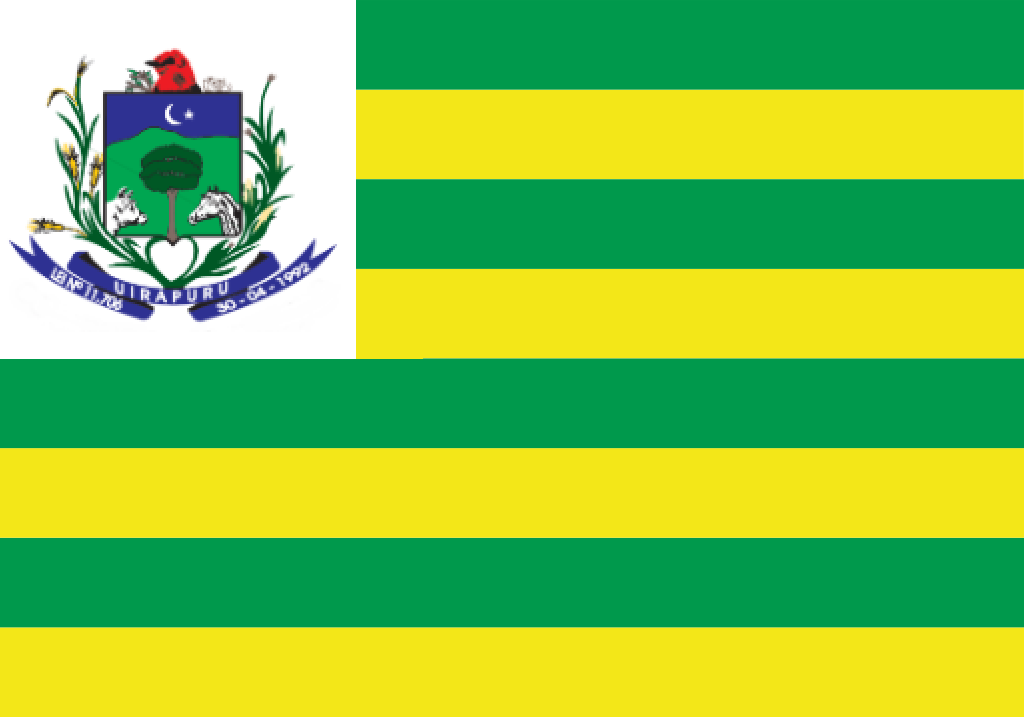
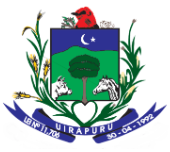
- Flag Coat of arms

- Location in Goiás state

- Location in Brazil
- Coordinates: 14°17′02″S 49°54′36″W
- Country: Brazil
- Region: Central-West
- State: Goiás
- Microregion: São Miguel do Araguaia Microregion

Area
  - Total: 1,153.42 km^{2} (445.34 sq mi)

Population (2020)
  - Total: 2,840
  - Density: 2.46/km^{2} (6.38/sq mi)
- Time zone: UTC−3 (BRT)
- Postal code: 76525-000

Uirapuru is a municipality in northwestern Goiás state, Brazil.

== Location ==
Uirapuru is in the São Miguel do Araguaia Microregion, west of the important BR-153 highway. It is connected by a paved road to Crixás, 35 kilometers to the south. The distance to the state capital, Goiânia, is 367 km. Highway connections are made by GO-080 / Nerópolis / São Francisco de Goiás / BR-153 / Jaraguá / Rianápolis / Rialma / GO-336 / Itapaci / GO-154 / Pilar de Goiás / Santa Terezinha de Goiás / GO-347 / Crixás / GO-156.

Municipal boundaries are with:

- north: Mundo Novo
- south: Crixás
- east: Nova Crixás
- west: Santa Terezinha de Goiás

In January 2005 the Mayor was Inácio da Luz Araújo. The city council had 09 members and there were 2,528 eligible voters (December/2007). The population density was 2.62 inhab/km^{2} (2007). The urban population was 1,524 while the rural population was 1,497. There has been a gain of about 100 people since 1996

The economy is based on subsistence agriculture, cattle raising, services, public administration, and small manufacturing industries. In 2007 there were 9 industrial units and 29 commercial units. There were only 119 automobiles. The cattle herd had 85,000 head (2006). The main crops were rice (600 hectares), sugarcane, beans, manioc, corn (400 hectares), and hearts of palm.

- Farms: 330
- Total agricultural area: 61,610 hectares
- Permanent planted area: 88 hectares
- Perennial planted area: 796 hectares
- Natural pasture: 43,358 hectares
- Woodland and forest: 14,930 hectares
- Workers related to the farm owner: 730
- Workers not related to the farm owner: 177 (IBGE)
- Tractors: 112
- Number of farms with tractors: 66

In the educational sector there were 6 schools with 1,138 students (2006). The adult literacy rate was 79.6% (2000) (national average was 86.4%). There were no hospitals in 2007. The infant mortality rate: 45.34 (2000) (national average was 33.0). This was an increase from 1998 when the rate was 28.28.

The score on the Municipal Human Development Index was 0.662. This ranked Uirapuru 230 out of 242 municipalities in the state in 2000, and 3,571 out of 5,507 municipalities in the country in 2000. The ranking on the Seplan Economic Development Index (2001) was 164 out of 246 municipalities (2001). See Seplan while on the Seplan Social Development Index (2000) the ranking was 229 out of 246 municipalities (2000) See Seplan

== See also ==
- List of municipalities in Goiás
