= Minaçu Airport =

José Caires de Oliveira Airport Aeroporto José Caires de Oliveira
- IATA: MQH; ICAO: SWIQ; LID: GO0019

Summary
- Airport type: Public
- Operator: Minaçu
- Serves: Minaçu
- Time zone: BRT (UTC−03:00)
- Elevation AMSL: 427 m (1,401 ft)
- Coordinates: 13°32′57″S 048°11′44″W

Map
- Location in Brazil

Runways
Direction	Length		Surface
Direction	m	ft	Surface
05/23	1,340	4,396	Asphalt
- Sources: ANAC, DECEA

José Caires de Oliveira Airport (IATA: MQH, ICAO: SWIQ) is the airport serving Minaçu, Brazil.

== Access ==
The airport is located 6 km (4 mi) from downtown Minaçu.

== See also ==
- List of airports in Brazil
