= George Ball (entomologist) =

American entomologist (1926–2019)

George Eugene Ball (25 September 1926 – 12 January 2019) was an American entomologist and expert in ground beetles (Carabidae). Born in Detroit, Michigan, he enlisted in the U.S. Marine Corps during World War II, where he served in the Battle of Okinawa. He earned his B.A. from Cornell University in 1949 and his M.S. from the University of Alabama in 1950. He returned to Cornell where he earned his PhD in 1954, and that same year joined the University of Alberta, becoming a full professor in 1965. He went on to serve as the entomology department's chair (1974–84) before retiring in 1992. He was a past president of the Entomological Society of Canada and The Coleopterists Society, received the 1980 Gold Medal from the Entomological Society of Canada for outstanding achievement in entomology, and was a Fellow of the Entomological Society of America. He produced over 130 scientific papers, edited five books, and supervised 40 graduate students and postdoctoral fellows. Antarctotrechus balli is named after him.
