= Minaçu =

- Municipality
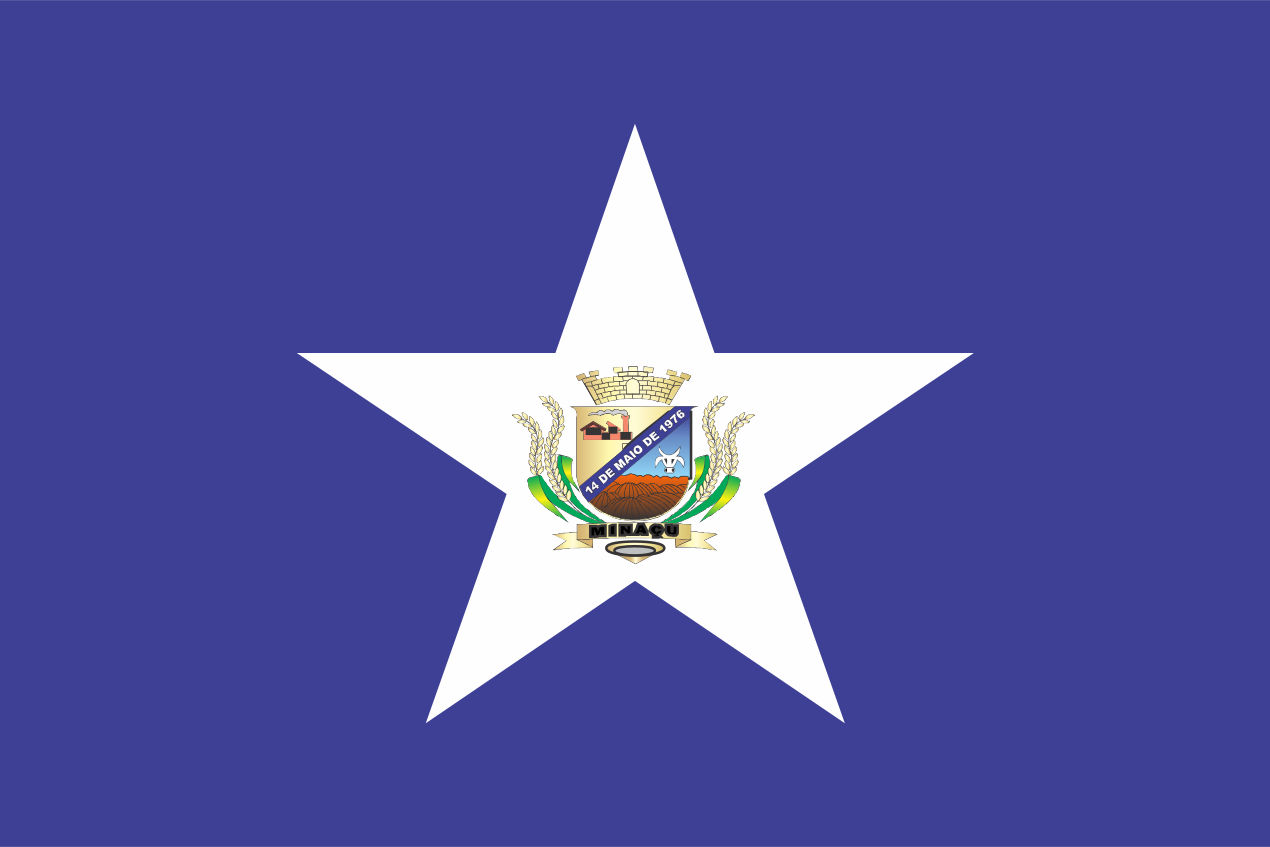
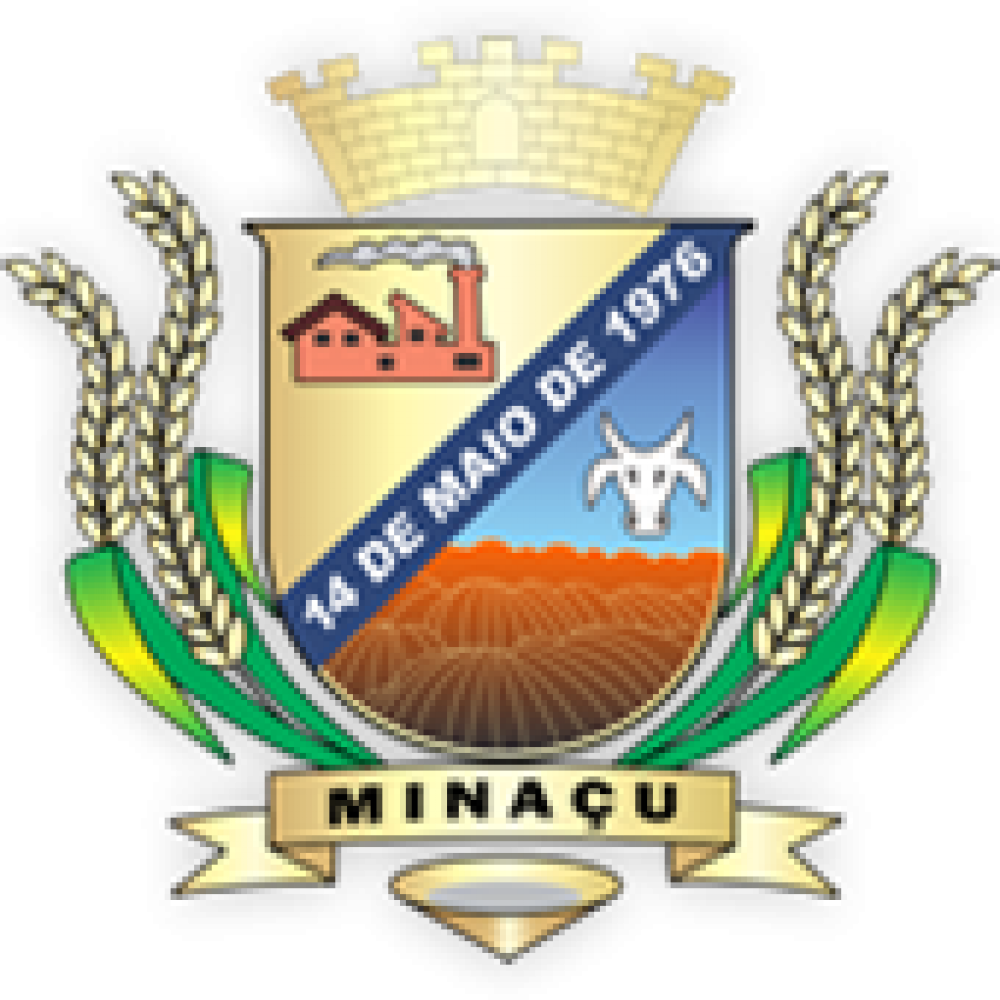
- Flag Coat of arms

- Location in Goiás state

- Location in Brazil
- Coordinates: 13°31′58″S 48°13′12″W
- Country: Brazil
- Region: Central-West
- State: Goiás
- Microregion: Porangatu Microregion

Area
  - Total: 2,860.7 km^{2} (1,104.5 sq mi)
- Elevation: 351 m (1,152 ft)

Population (2020)
  - Total: 28,793
  - Density: 10.065/km^{2} (26.068/sq mi)
- Time zone: UTC−3 (BRT)
- Postal code: 76450-000

Minaçu is a municipality in the north of the state of Goiás, Brazil. There is a large asbestos mine in the municipality.

== Location and climate ==
It is located on the shores of the artificial lake, Cana Brava, created after a dam was constructed on the Tocantins River. This important river, a tributary of the Amazon, flows out of the lake in a northerly direction. The distance to the state capital, Goiânia, is 513 km. A paved road links Minaçu with the important Belém-Brasília highway (BR 153) and the cities of the more populated southern region of the state.

The climate is tropical humid with two well defined seasons (rainy and dry. The average annual temperature is 26.6 °C.

== Demographic information ==
The population density was 10.85 inhabitants/km^{2} in 2007. The population has increased gradually since 1980 when it was 28,371. The rural population has diminished from 9,762 in 1980 to 4,404 in 2007. From 1996 to 2007 the population decreased -1.24.%. In recent years the population has been decreasing with the gradual phasing out of the mines and the completion of the hydroelectric power plant.

== Economy ==
The economy is based on small industry, mining, and the hydroelectric plant of Cana Brava. This supplies the south of Goiás with energy and contributes needed taxes to the municipality. Agriculture is limited due to the irregular terrain marked by the Serra Dourada mountains.

In 2006 there were 107,300 head of cattle, of which 9,600 were dairy cows. The main agricultural products in planted area were rice and corn. There was modest production of banana, sugarcane, and manioc. In 2006 there were 1,478 farms with a total area of 196,000 hectares, of which 5,597 were cropland and 12,128 were pasture. Approximately 4,300 people were connected to agriculture. (IBGE 2006)

In 2007 there were 43 industrial units and 259 retail units. There were 3 bank branches: Banco do Brasil S.A., Banco Itaú S.A., and BRADESCO S.A. The main sectors employing the population were: industry—159 workers—and commerce—838 workers.

=== Asbestos mine ===
Minaçu is the seat of one of the world's largest chrysotile asbestos mines. The Cana Brava mine, located on the left bank of the Tocantins River, occupies a total area of 45 kmª. Asbestos has made Minaçu one of the richest municipalities in the state of Goiás. The industrial zone has capacity to produce ten percent of all the chrysotile asbestos fiber sold in the world. It is the largest mine in Brazil and the third in the world, after mines in Russia and Canada. On the Seplan Index of Economic Development (2000) Minaçu ranked 13 out of 146 municipalities in the state. See Seplan

=== Rare earths mining ===
Minaçu is now becoming an important hub for rare-earth mineral production. Early in 2024 the Serra Verde Group began commercial operations at the Pela Ema deposit, which is located approximately 30km west-northwest of Minaçu. Serra Verde is claimed to be the only large-scale producer outside Asia currently capable of supplying all four key magnetic rare-earth elements: neodymium, praseodymium, dysprosium and terbium.

It is hoped that this mining operation will restore prosperity to Minaçu, though there are doubts about whether local people will benefit significantly and concerns regarding environmental impacts.

In April 2026 USA Rare Earth acquired the Serra Verde Group in a transaction valued at approximately US$2.8 billion.

== Health and education ==
In 2003 there were 2 hospitals in the city with 53 beds. There were also 12 walk-in health clinics. There were 45 doctors, 6 nurses and 8 dentists. The infant mortality rate was 20.88 for every 1,000 live births in 2000.

In 2005 the school system had 27 schools, 266 classrooms, 577 teachers, and 11,437 students. Higher education was represented by a campus of the State University of Goiás—Unidade Universitária da UEG. The adult literacy rate was 86.9% in 2000.

- MHDI: 0.750
- State ranking: 78 (out of 242 municipalities)
- National ranking: 1,894 (out of 5,507 municipalities)

On the Seplan Index of Social Development Minaçu ranked 79 out of 146 municipalities in 2001. See Seplan

== Transportation ==
The city is served by Minaçu Airport.

== See also ==
- List of municipalities in Goiás
