= Campinorte =

- Municipality
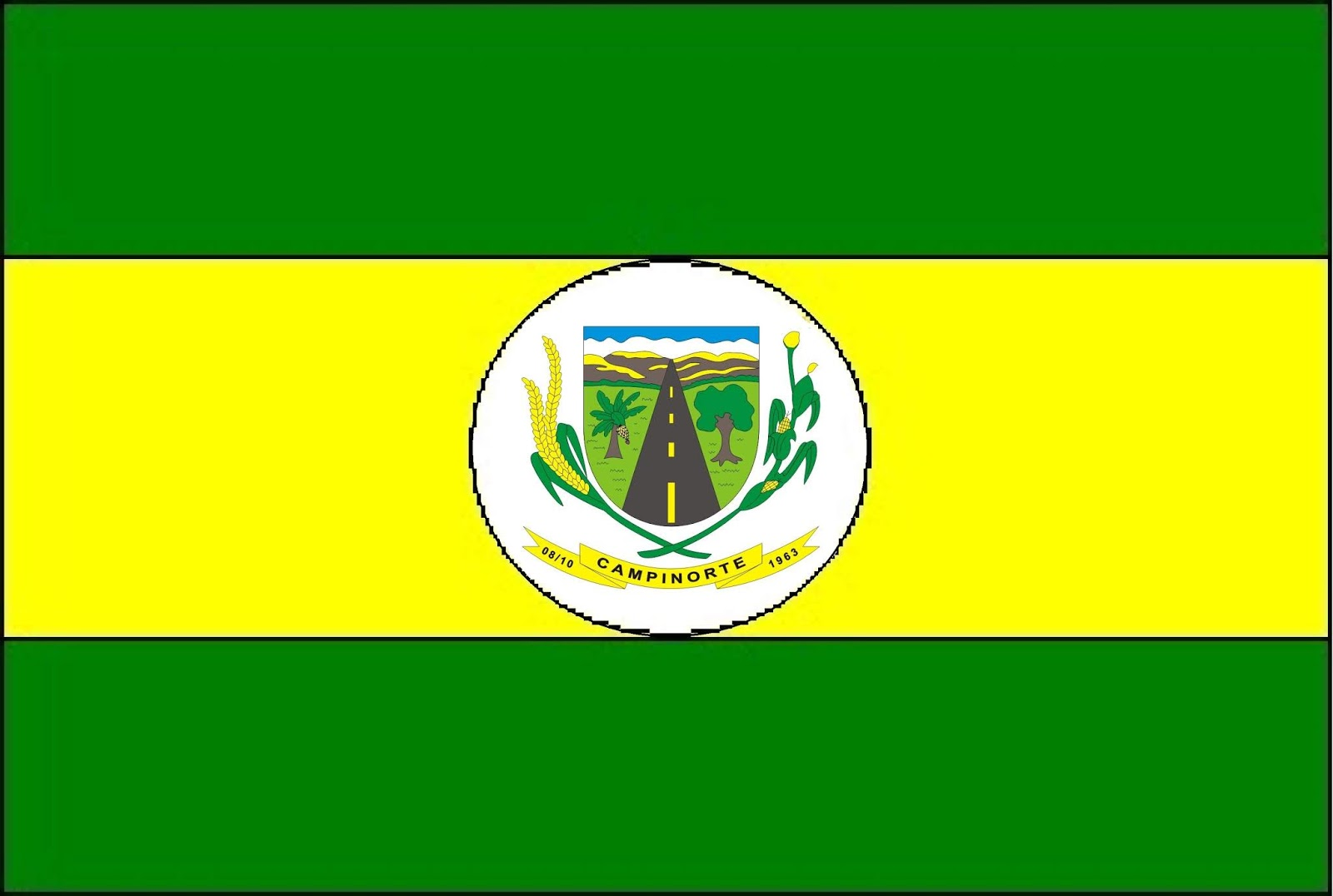
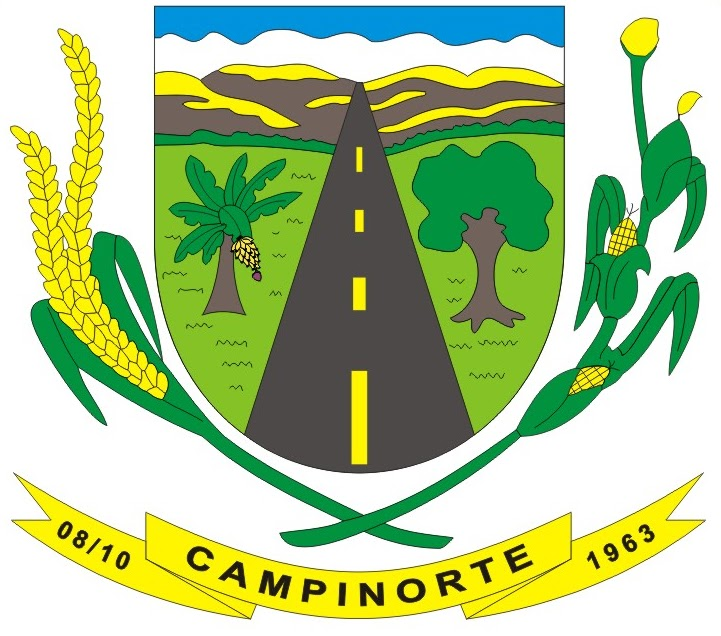
- Flag Coat of arms

- Location in Goiás state

- Location in Brazil
- Coordinates: 14°18′54″S 49°09′00″W
- Country: Brazil
- Region: Central-West
- State: Goiás
- Microregion: Porangatu Microregion

Area
  - Total: 1,068 km^{2} (412 sq mi)
- Elevation: 537 m (1,762 ft)

Population (2020)
  - Total: 12,764
  - Density: 11.95/km^{2} (30.95/sq mi)
- Time zone: UTC−3 (BRT)
- Postal code: 76440-000

Campinorte is a municipality in north-central Goiás state, Brazil. The population was 12,764 (2020) in a total area of 1,068 km^{2}.

== Location ==
Campinorte is located on the important Belém-Brasília, BR-153, and is 315 kilometers from the state capital, Goiânia. It is 22 kilometers north of Uruaçu and just west of the great artificial lake of Serra da Mesa. Anápolis, the second most important city in the state, is 276 kilometers to the south. Campinorte belongs to the Porangatu Microregion.

Municipal boundaries are with:

- North: Mara Rosa
- South: Uruaçu
- East: Uruaçu and Campinaçu
- West: Nova Iguaçu de Goiás and Mara Rosa

== Demographics ==
The population density in 2007 was 9.08 inhabitants/km^{2} while the population growth rate for 2000–2007 was 0.08.%. The urban population was 7,448 and the rural population was 2,249.

== History ==
The origins of Campinorte go back to 1918. It was called Campinas. In 1935 the first school was built in the region. Next a settler donated land to build the first chapel to pay homage to Saint Sebastian, patron saint of the town. When the government began to build the new highway nearby, in 1948, the settlers moved their primitive houses to the edge of the route. Campinas died and a new town, Campinorte, came to life. At first it was a district of Uruaçu, but in 1953 it became a separate municipality.

== The economy ==
Main economic activities are cattle raising (43,000 head) and agriculture, with plantations of corn, rice, and beans. There are 479 rural properties in the region with 7,131 hectares of planted area. There were approximately 1,500 persons connected to the farming sector. Pasture land made up 171,000 hectares in 2006. The industrial sector is represented by some small producers of bricks, lumber, and dairy products. The main agricultural products were rice, corn, and soybeans (9,000 hectares).

- Industrial units: 14
- Retail units: 128
- Financial institutions: Banco do Brasil, S.A.
- Dairy: Cooperativa Agropecuária Regional de Campinorte
- Automobiles in 2007: 803

== Health and education ==
The infant mortality rate was 14.08 (2000) while the literacy rate was 83.8. There was one hospital with 17 beds and 13 schools with 2,891 students. The score on the Municipal Human Development Index was 0.750.

- State ranking: 76 (out of 242 municipalities)
- National ranking: 1,872 (out of 5,507 municipalities) See Frigoletto
- Tourism is centered on the Serra da Mesa lake, which is beginning to offer boating, water skiing, and windsurf.

== See also ==
- List of municipalities in Goiás
- Microregions of Goiás
