= Porangatu =

- Municipality
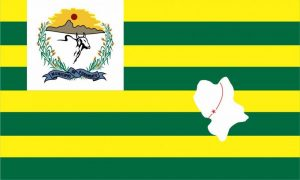
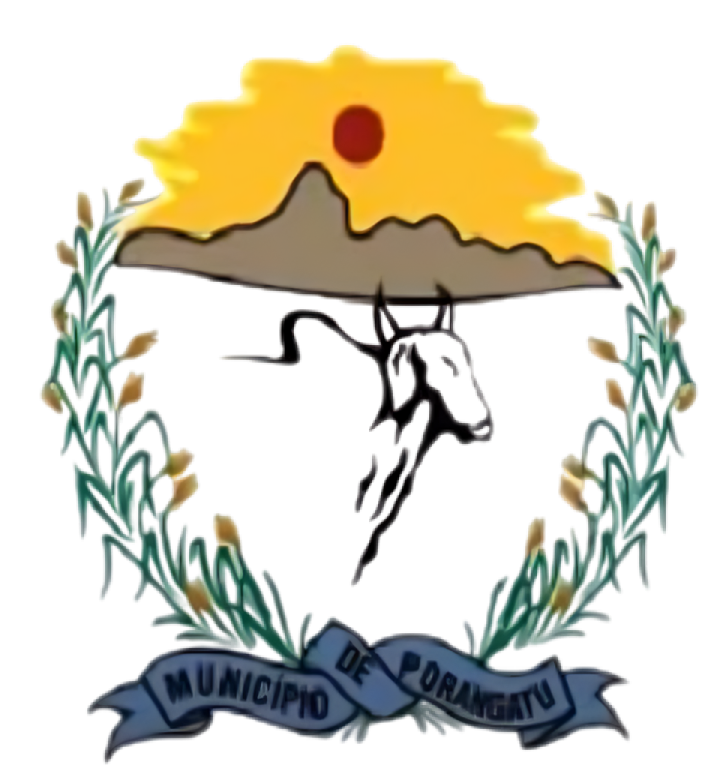
- Flag Coat of arms

- Location in Goiás state

- Location in Brazil
- Coordinates: 13°25′55″S 49°07′50″W
- Country: Brazil
- Region: Central-West
- State: Goiás
- Microregion: Porangatu

Area
  - Total: 4,820.4 km^{2} (1,861.2 sq mi)
- Elevation: 390 m (1,280 ft)

Population (2020)
  - Total: 45,632
  - Density: 9.4664/km^{2} (24.518/sq mi)
- Time zone: UTC−3 (BRT)
- Postal code: 76550-000
- Website: www.porangatu.go.gov.br

Porangatu is a town in Goiás state, Brazil.

== Geography ==
Parangatu is in its own microregion, Porangatu Microregion, of 226,766 inhabitants in an area of 35.287 km^{2}; 426 km from the state capital, Goiânia. This microregion serves as a nucleus for eighteen municipalities in the north of Goiás state. The municipal seat is just west of the important interstate highway BR-153, which connects Belém with Brasília and just south of the state line with the state of Tocantins.

Important rivers are the Santa Tereza, Cana Brava, Ouro Pintado, Santa Maria and Gregório. The climate is hot, moist tropical, with frequent occurrences of a maximum of 40 °C. The average minimum is 21C, the maximum is 40 °C and the minimum is 21 °C. The elevation is 390 meters above sea level and the highest points are Serra da Sabina and Serra dos Picos.

== History ==
The first settlement began in the eighteenth century with the discovery of gold in the region. Attacks from the local Indians, the Canoeiros, kept the settlement, called Descoberto, from developing. Until 1933 it was a district belonging to Pilar de Goiás, when it became part of the municipality of Santana, later changed to Uruaçu. In 1943 Descoberto was changed to Porangatu, from Tupi-Guarani, meaning "poran", beautiful, and "gatu", landscape. In 1948 it was dismembered from Uruaçu. With the building of the Belém to Brasília highway (BR-153) in 1958 Porangatu grew quickly to become the most important commercial center of this new region that was opening up to migrants from the south.

== Political information ==
- Imperatiz: Vanuza Valadares (January 2024)
- Eligible voters: 28,739 (December 2007)
- City council: 9 members

== Demographic information ==
- Population density: 8.14 inhabitants/km^{2} (2007)
- Urban population: 33,077(2007)
- Rural population: 6,161 (2007)
- Population growth or loss: a gain of about 5,500 people since 1980 -0,45% decrease 1996/2007

== Economic information ==
The economy is based on agriculture, cattle raising, services, public administration, and small transformation industries.

Most of the economy is dependent on cattle raising and agriculture, but in recent years the region has attracted medium size industries. Porangatu is today the commercial center for the north of Goiás receiving people from all the neighboring region to buy its products. Commerce employed 2,065 people in 2005.

- Industrial units: 75 (2007)
- Commercial units: 432 (2007)
- Bank agencies: Banco do Brasil S.A. - BRADESCO S.A. - Banco Itaú S.A. - CEF.

(August 2007)

- Dairy: - LACEL - Laticínios Ceres Ltda. - Agroindústria Camapum Ltda (22/05/2006)
- Meat packing plant: FRIRAL - Frigorífico Fronteiras Ltda.; - HBC Comércio e Representações Ltda. (22/05/2006)
- Motor vehicles: 4,810 automobiles (2007)

=== Agricultural Data (2006) ===
- Farms: 1,532
- Total agricultural Area: 395,310 hectares
- Permanent Planted Area: 331 hectares
- Temporary Planted Area: 5,823 hectares
- Natural Pasture: 267,860 hectares
- Woodland and Forest: 113,655 hectares
- Workers related to the farm owner: 2,717
- Workers not related to the farm owner: 1,022 (IBGE)
- Cattle herd: 332,000 head (2006)
- Main crops: rice (1,500 hectares) corn (1,400 hectares), and soybeans (2,000 hectares).

== Education (2006) ==
- Schools: 48 with 12,244 students
- Middle school enrollment: 2,277 students
- Higher education: Porangatu has a campus of the Universidade Estadual de Goiás with courses in the following areas: Biology, Mathematics, Geography, Humanities and Computer Science.UEG
- Adult literacy rate: 80.5% (2000) (national average was 86.4%)

== Health (2007) ==
- Hospitals: 6
- Hospital beds: 200
- Ambulatory clinics: 18
- Infant mortality rate: 32.75 (2000) (national average was 33.0).

== Municipal Human Development Index 2000 ==
- Municipal Human Development Index MHDI: 0.761
- State ranking: 52 (out of 242 municipalities)
- National ranking: 1,562 (out of 5,507 municipalities)

== Seplan Economic Development Index ==
The ranking was 110 out of 246 municipalities. See Seplan

== Seplan Social Development Index ==
The ranking was 120 out of 246 municipalities. See Seplan

== See also ==
- List of municipalities in Goiás
