= Uruaçu =

- Municipality
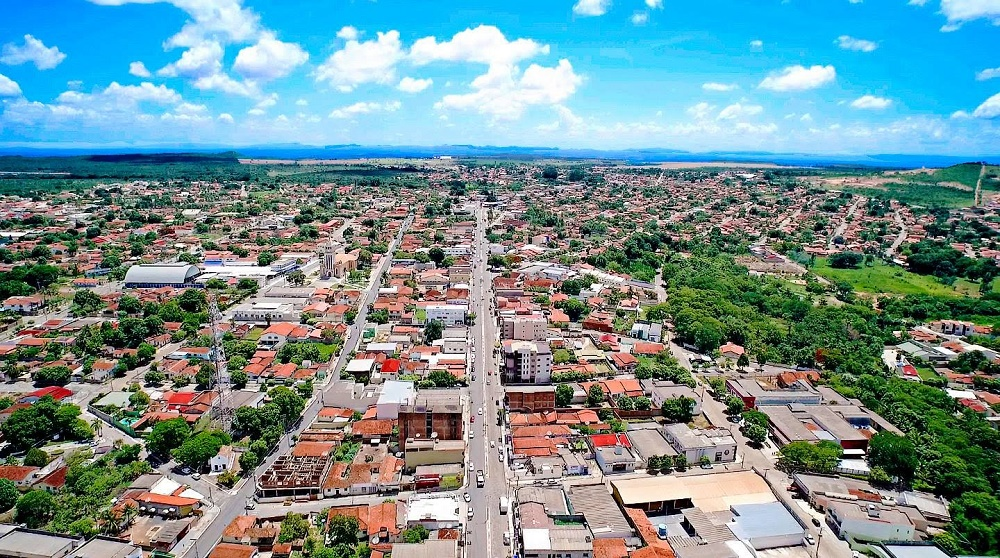
- View of Uruaçu

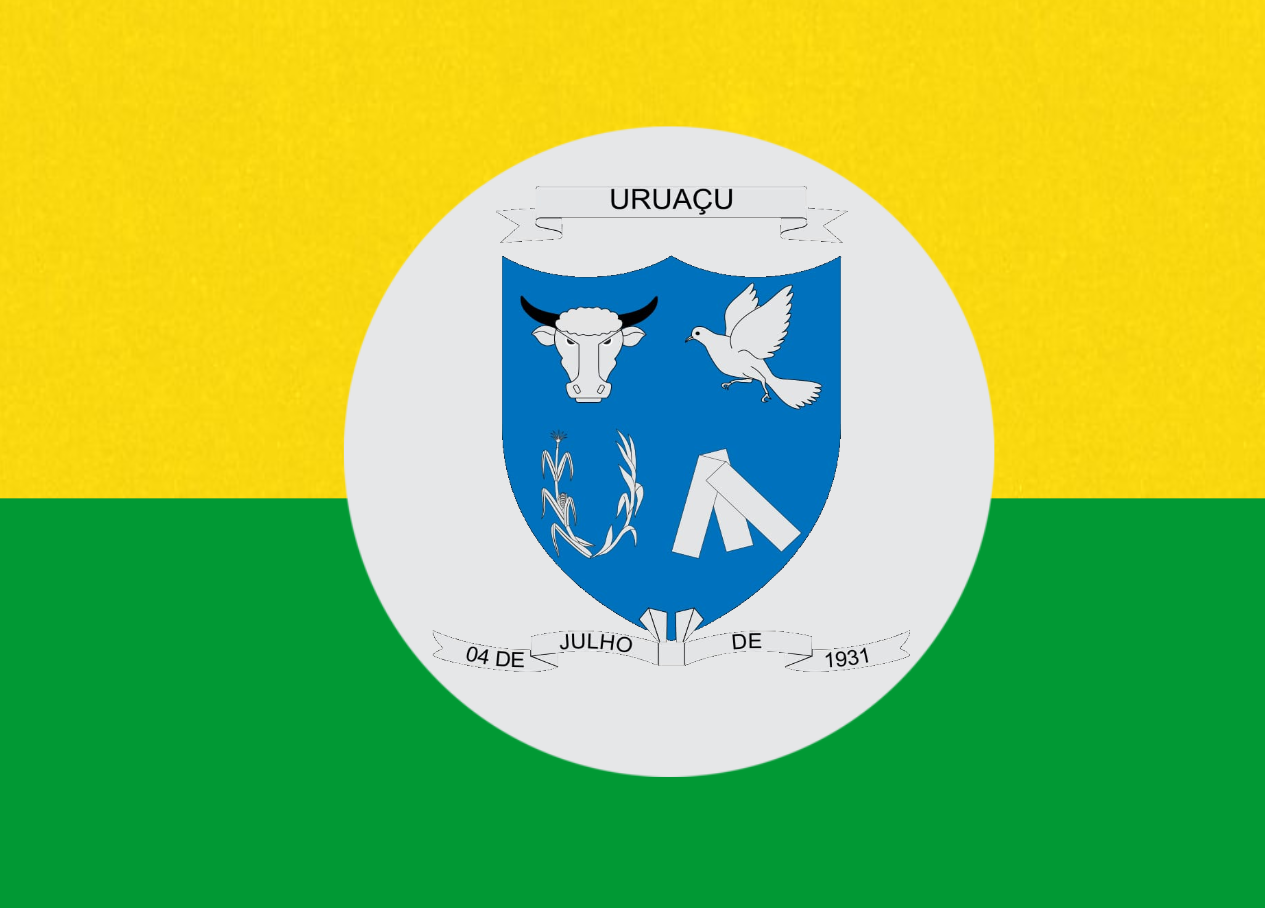
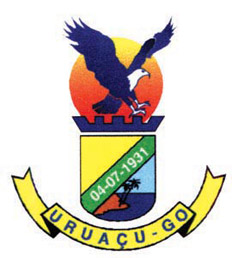
- Flag Coat of arms

- Location in Goiás state

- Location in Brazil
- Coordinates: 14°31′10″S 49°08′42″W
- Country: Brazil
- Region: Central-West
- State: Goiás

Area
  - Total: 2,141.7 km^{2} (826.9 sq mi)
- Elevation: 520 m (1,710 ft)

Population (2020)
  - Total: 40,840
  - Density: 19.07/km^{2} (49.39/sq mi)
- Time zone: UTC−3 (BRT)
- Postal code: 76400-000
- Website: www.uruacu.go.gov.br

Uruaçu is a city and municipality in north Goiás state, Brazil.

== Geography ==
Uruaçu is located north of Anápolis and Goiânia on the important interstate highway BR-153, which links Brasília to Belém. It is 269 km. from Goiânia and 244 km. from Brasília. It belongs to the Porangatu Microregion.

Municipal boundaries are with:

- North: Nova Iguaçu de Goiás and Campinorte
- South: Hidrolina and Santa Rita do Novo Destino
- East: Niquelândia
- West: Hidrolina

On the west the municipal boundary follows the Serra Dourada mountains, where the Passa Três river has its source and supplies the city with its drinking water. On the east the boundary is formed by the Serra da Mesa reservoir (43 meters deep and 1,784 km^{2} in area).

The climate is moist tropical, with maximum temperatures of 38 °C, minimums of 18 °C and an average of 28 °C.

== History ==
The origin of this town was the Passa Três ranch acquired by the Fernandes family in 1910 and located in the municipality of Pilar de Goiás along the route used by muleteers and merchants from the south. In 1913 Coronel Gaspar donated lands to build a chapel dedicated to Saint Anne and the settlement was called Sant'Ana. In 1924 the settlement was raised to a district and in 1931 it became a municipality. In 1943 the name was changed to Uruaçu, which in Tupi-Guaraní means "large bird". In 1948 Uruaçu lost the district of Porangatu, which became the municipality of Porangatu, now the most important city in the region. in 1953 it lost the district of Amaro Leite, which became the municipality of Amaro Leite, later changed to Mara Rosa.

== Demographics and politics ==
In January 2013 the mayor was Solange Abadia Rodrigues Bertulino. The population density was 15.59 inhabitants/km^{2} (2007). Urban population was 36.929 (2010) while rural population was 3,070 (2007). The town has lost about 1,000 people since 1980. There was a -0,11% growth rate for 1996/2007.

== Economy ==
The economy is based on subsistence agriculture, cattle raising, services, public administration, and small transformation industries.

- Industrial units: 46 (2007)
- Commercial units: 411 (2007)
- Dairy: - Laticínios Morrinhos Ind. e Com. Ltda. - Associação do Médio Norte Goiano - ASNORTE. (22/05/2006)
- Financial institutions: Banco do Brasil S.A. - BRADESCO S.A - Banco Itaú S.A. - CEF (08/2007)
- Automobiles: 4,689 (2007)
- Farms: 1,247
- Total agricultural Area: 152,573 hectares
- Permanent Planted Area: 1,768 hectares
- Temporary Planted Area: 13,144 hectares
- Natural Pasture: 88,380 hectares
- Woodland and Forest: 41,105 hectares
- Workers related to the farm owner: 2,335
- Workers not related to the farm owner: 765 (IBGE)
- Cattle herd: 104,000 head (2006)
- Main crops: rice (300 hectares), coconut (75 hectares), corn (600 hectares), and soybeans (9,500 hectares). (IBGE)

== Health and education ==
In the educational sector there were 46 schools with 10,693 students in 2006. In higher education there was a campus of the UEG - Faculdade de Educação, Ciências e Letras de Uruaçu. The adult literacy rate was 85.7% (2000) (national average was 86.4%). The town was served by 2 hospitals with 113 beds in 2007. The infant mortality rate was 27.33 (2000) (national average was 33.0).

- Municipal Human Development Index: 0.738 (The state ranking was 113 out of 242 municipalities in 2000 and the national ranking was 2,222 out of 5,507 municipalities in 2000). (Frigoletto)
- Seplan Economic Development Index: The ranking was 156 out of 246 municipalities. See Seplan
- Seplan Social Development Index: The ranking was 171 out of 246 municipalities. See Seplan

== See also ==
- List of municipalities in Goiás
- Microregions of Goiás
