= Mundo Novo, Goiás =

Mundo Novo
- Municipality
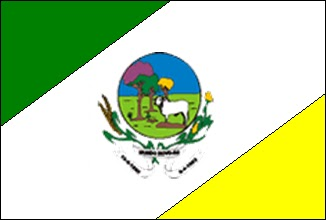
- Flag

- Location in Goiás state

- Location in Brazil
- Coordinates: 13°46′37″S 50°16′33″W
- Country: Brazil
- Region: Central-West
- State: Goiás
- Microregion: São Miguel do Araguaia Microregion

Area
  - Total: 2,146 km^{2} (829 sq mi)
- Elevation: 263 m (863 ft)

Population (2020)
  - Total: 4,713
  - Density: 2.196/km^{2} (5.688/sq mi)
- Time zone: UTC−3 (BRT)
- Postal code: 76530-000

Mundo Novo is a municipality in northeastern Goiás state, Brazil.

Mundo Novo is located in the São Miguel do Araguaia Microregion in the extreme north-west of the state. It is cut by the Rio Palmital, which flows north into the Araguaia River. It has road connections with São Miguel—72 kilometers to the north, Nova Crixás—42 kilometers to the south, and Uirapuru—67 kilometers to the southeast.

The distance to the state capital, Goiânia, is 429 km. Highway connections are made by GO-070 / Goianira / Inhumas / Itaberaí / BR-070 / Goiás / GO-164 / Faina / Araguapaz / Nova Crixás / GO-156 for 42 km.

Neighboring municipalities are:

- north: São Miguel do Araguaia
- east: Amaralina
- south and west: Nova Crixás

There are several rivers: Rio Palmital, Rio Crixás, and Rio Crixás Mirim, all of them tributaries of the Araguaia River

Novo Mundo began in 1960 on the Nossa Senora Aparecida Ranch owned by Valentim Lourenço, from São Paulo. In 1963 Lourenço divided lots to create a settlement called "Mundo Novo". In 1968 it became a district of Crixás, and was dismembered in 1980.

In January 2005 the Mayor was Maria Beatriz Alves Azambuja and the Vice-mayor was Carlos Osário Lacerda. The city council had 9 members and in 2007 there were 4,692 eligible voters.

In 2007 the population density was 3.20 inhabitants/km^{2}. The urban population was 3,974 and the rural population was 2,903. The population grew quickly from 1991 until 2006. Between 1996 and 2007 the geometric population growth rate was 1.99.%.

The economy is based on cattle raising, agriculture, services, government employment, wood extraction, and modest transformation industries. In 2007 there were 5 industrial establishments and 59 retail establishments. There was one financial institution: BRADESCO S.A. The sectors employing most of the workers (2005) were: public administration with 198 salaried workers, commerce with 106 workers, and agriculture and forestry with 53 workers. In 2007 there were 218 automobiles.

In 2007 there were 187,030 head of cattle. Poultry and swine production was on a minor scale. In 2006 the main agricultural products were pineapple, squash, cotton, rice, sugarcane, sesame, manioc, watermelon, and corn. Only corn had a planted area of over 500 hectares, with 900 hectares.

- Farms: 744
- Permanent Planted Area: 889 hectares
- Perennial Planted Area: 16,876 hectares
- Natural Pasture: 100,845 hectares
- Woodland and Forest: 30,752 hectares
- Workers related to the farm owner: 2,029
- Workers not related to the farm owner: 431
- Farms with tractors: 65
- Tractors: 110 (IBGE 2006)

In 2007 there was 1 hospital with 20 beds and 2 walk-in health clinics. The infant mortality rate was 31.85, higher than the national average of 35.0 in the same year. In 2006 the school system had 6 schools, 42 classrooms, 79 teachers, and 2,240 students. There was 1 public middle school and no institutions of higher learning. The adult literacy rate was 81.1%, lower than the national rate of 86.4%.

Mundo Novo is in an isolated and impoverished region of the state. It ranks 0.692 on the 2000 United Nations Human Development Index and is 216 out of 242 municipalities in the state and 3,118 out of 5,507 in the country. On the Seplan Economic Development Index (2001) the ranking was 167 out of 246 municipalities (2001). See Seplan and on the Seplan Social Development Index (2000) the ranking was 91 out of 246 municipalities (2000) See Seplan
