= Nova Crixás =

- Municipality
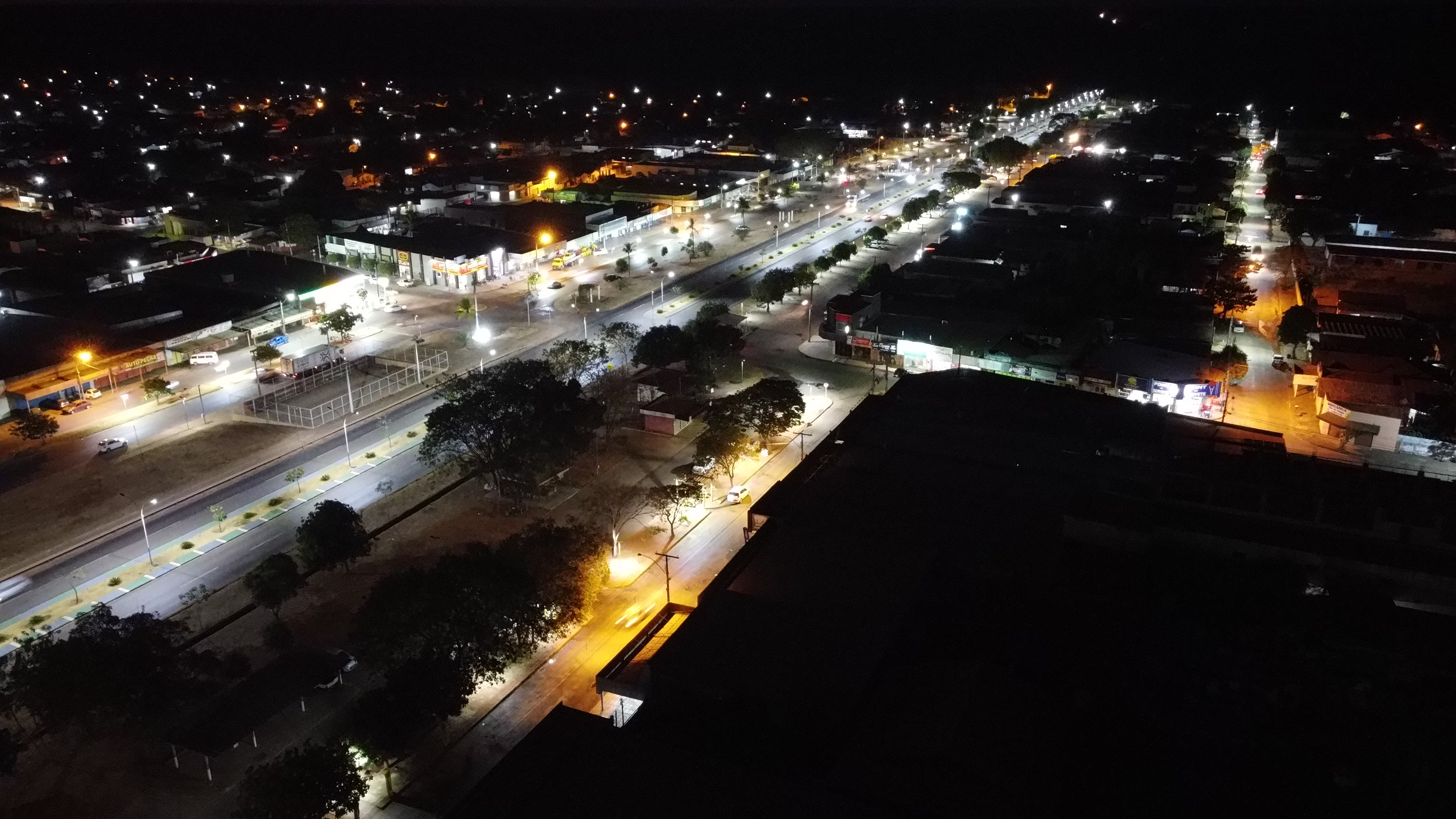

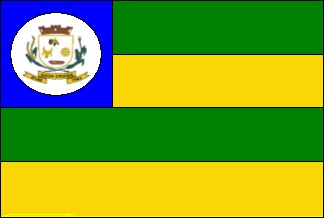
- Flag

- Location in Goiás state

- Location in Brazil
- Coordinates: 14°05′53″S 50°19′26″W
- Country: Brazil
- Region: Central-West
- State: Goiás
- Microregion: São Miguel do Araguaia Microregion

Area
  - Total: 7,298 km^{2} (2,818 sq mi)
- Elevation: 360 m (1,180 ft)

Population (2020)
  - Total: 12,945
  - Density: 1.774/km^{2} (4.594/sq mi)
- Time zone: UTC−3 (BRT)
- Postal code: 76520-000

Nova Crixás is a municipality in northeastern Goiás state, Brazil. It is one of the largest municipalities in the state and is the largest producer of beef cattle in the state.

Nova Crixás is located in the Araguaia River valley and is part of the São Miguel do Araguaia Microregion. There are municipal boundaries with Crixás, Mundo Novo, Aruanã, São Miguel do Araguaia, Mozarlândia and the state of Mato Grosso. Neighboring towns are far away. Mundo Novo is 42 km. to the north; Crixás is 67 km. to the southeast; and Mozarlândia is 85 km. to the south. The distance to the state capital, Goiânia, is 370 km. Highway connections are made by GO-070 / Goianira / Inhumas / Itaberaí / BR-070 / Goiás / GO-164 / Araguapaz.

The name is derived from the name of the town of Crixás and the Rio Crixás Mirim, which crosses the municipality and flows north into the Araguaia River.

The region is bathed by numerous springs and rivers, with the most important being Araguaia River, Peixe River, and two lakes, Lago Redondo and Lago Maravilha. These bodies of water constitute a great attraction for tourists to the region.

Nova Crixás began in the 1970s when the family of José Alves Moreira, from Minas Gerais, acquired lands in the region for the practice of agriculture. The town began to grow with the building of highway G0-174, linking Goiânia to São Miguel do Araguaia. In 1980 it was dismembered from Crixás and became a district and municipality.

In January 2005 the Mayor was José Maria Gomes. There were 9 councilmembers and 7,411 eligible voters in 2007. In 2007 the population density was 1.73 inhabitants/km^{2}, one of the lowest in the state. In 2007 the urban area had 8,039 inhabitants and the rural area had 4,564. The population increased 1,74% from 1996/2007.

The economy is based on agriculture, cattle raising, services, public administration and small transformation industries. In 2006 there were 8 industrial units and 104 retail units. Public administration was the biggest employer with 452 workers, followed by commerce with 228 (IBGE 2005). There were 2 financial institutions. In 2007 there were 461 automobiles, but 598 motorcycles in the city. In 2006 there were 690,665 head of cattle, which ranked Nova Crixás in first place in the state. The main agricultural products were rice, bananas, sesame, manioc, corn, and soybeans. None exceeded 500 hectares in planted area.

- Farms: 693
- Total agricultural Area: 491,142 hectares
- Permanent Planted Area: 295 hectares
- Temporary Planted Area: 21,131 hectares
- Natural Pasture: 351,196 hectares
- Woodland and Forest: 110,781 hectares
- Workers related to the farm owner: 1,768
- Workers not related to the farm owner: 1,105 (IBGE)
- Tractors: 570
- Number of farms with tractors: 301

In 2007 there was 1 hospital with 32 beds and 5 walk-in health clinics. In 2000 the infant mortality rate was 37.23, above the national average of 33.0. In 2006 the school system had 12 schools, 91 classrooms, 146 teachers, and 3,546 students. In 2000 the adult literacy rate was 78.7%, well below the national average of 86.4%

The score on the 2000 Municipal Human Development Index was 0.686. This gave a state ranking of 219 (out of 242 municipalities) and a national ranking of 3,222 (out of 5,507 municipalities). On the Seplan Economic Development Index (2001) the ranking was 92 out of 246 municipalities. See Seplan, while on the Seplan Social Development Index (200), the ranking was 149 out of 246 municipalities. See Seplan

== See also ==
- List of municipalities in Goiás
