= Matrinchã =

- Municipality
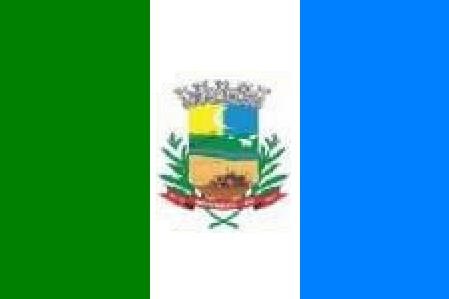
- Flag

- Location in Goiás state
- Coordinates: 15°26′19″S 50°44′32″W
- Country: Brazil
- State: Goiás
- IBGE statistical microregion: Rio Vermelho Microregion

Area
  - Total: 1,150.8 km^{2} (444.3 sq mi)
- Elevation: 315 m (1,033 ft)

Population (2020)
  - Total: 4,336
  - Density: 3.768/km^{2} (9.759/sq mi)
- Time zone: UTC−3 (BRT)
- CEP: 76730-000

Matrinchã is a municipality in west-central Goiás state, Brazil.

== Location ==
- Statistical microregion: Rio Vermelho Microregion
- Distance to the state capital: 261 km.
- Distance to regional center (Goiás Velho): 106 km.
- Highway connections: GO-070 / Goianira / Inhumas / Itaberaí / BR-070 / Goiás / Itapirapuã / GO-070 / Águas de São João.

Neighboring municipalities: Araguapaz, Faina, Aruanã Itapirapuã, and Britânia. Matrinchã was a district of Aruanã until it got municipal status in 1987.

== Geography and climate ==
The main rivers are the Rio Vermelho, which has beaches, tropical vegetation, and a great variety of animals and fish; Rio do Peixe, and Rio Ferreira.

The climate is classified as semi-humid tropical, with a minimum temperature of 15 °C, an average of 30 °C, and a maximum of 40 °C.

== Political information ==
In January 2005 the mayor was Natalino Lucas and the vice-mayor was João Batista Costa. There were 9 members on the city council and the number of eligible voters was 3,627 in 2007.

== Demographic information ==
In 2007 the population density was 3.76 inhabitants/km^{2}. The population has grown steadily since 1991, a year after the municipality was created. In 1991 there were 3,869 inhabitants. The growth rate from 1991 to 2000 was 1.74%. Most of the population is urban with 2,993 living in the urban area and 1,332 living in the rural area in 2007.

== Economy ==
The economy is based on cattle raising but most inhabitants are employed in services, public employment, and small transformation industries. In 2007 there were 4 industrial units and 49 retail units. There was one dairy—C.R. Indústria e Comércio de Laticínios Ltda—and a branch of the Banco do Brasil S.A.

In 2006 there were 116,000 cattle. Poultry and swine numbers were modest. The main agricultural products were pineapple, cotton, rice, beans, manioc, corn, hearts of palm, soybeans, and tomato. No agricultural crop exceeded 1,000 planted hectares in 2006.

== Health and education ==
In 2007 there was 1 hospital with 18 beds and 2 walk-in public health clinics. In 2000, the infant mortality rate was 28.53 (in 1,000 live births).

The school system had 5 schools, 32 classrooms, 63 teachers, and 1,434 students in 2005. There were no institutions of higher education. The adult literacy rate was 82.4% in 2000.

- MHDI: 0.710
- State ranking: 197 (out of 242 municipalities in 2000)
- National ranking: 2,830 (out of 5,507 municipalities in 2000)

== See also ==
- List of municipalities in Goiás
