= Mozarlândia =

- Municipality
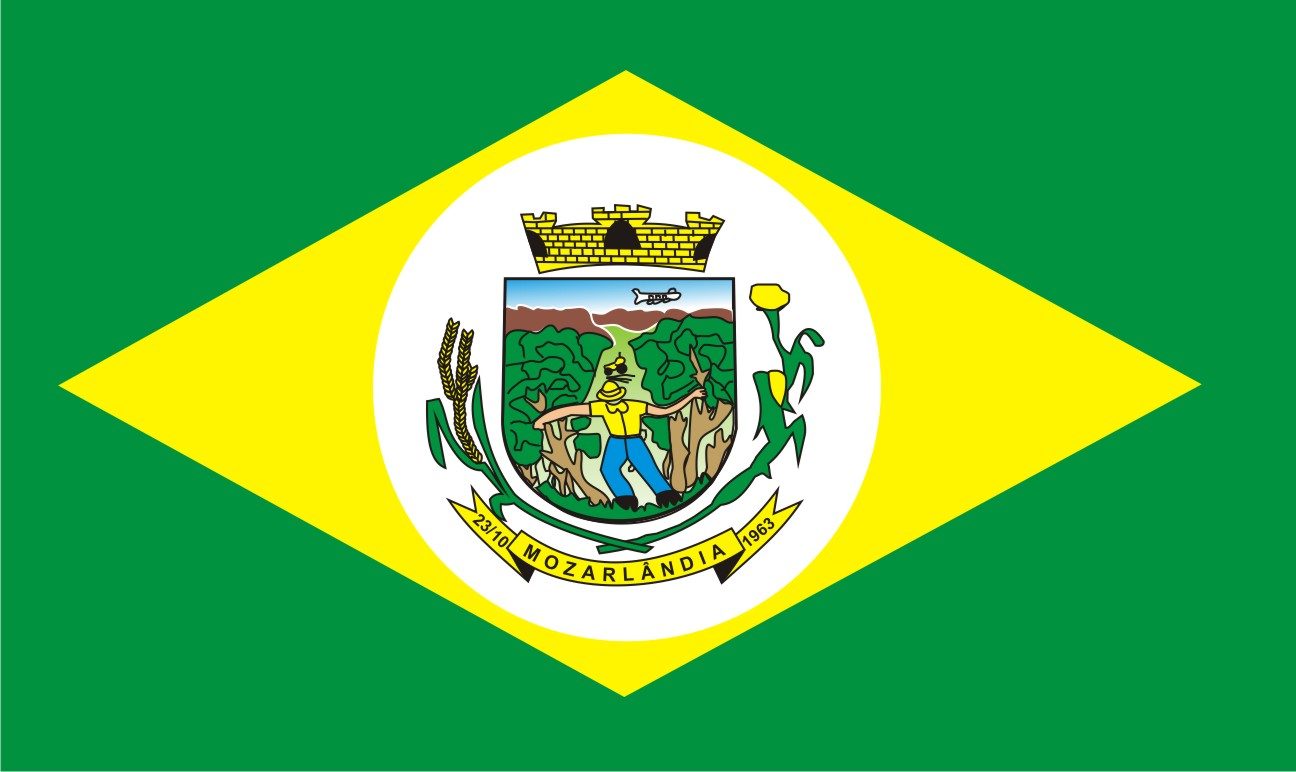
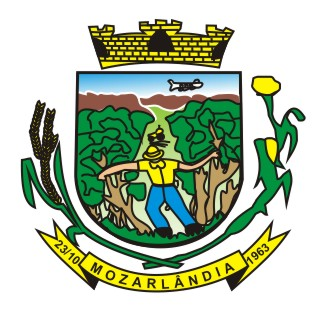
- Flag Coat of arms

- Location in Goiás state

- Location in Brazil
- Coordinates: 14°44′26″S 50°33′07″W
- Country: Brazil
- Region: Central-West
- State: Goiás
- Microregion: São Miguel do Araguaia Microregion

Area
  - Total: 1,734 km^{2} (670 sq mi)
- Elevation: 320 m (1,050 ft)

Population (2020)
  - Total: 15,870
  - Density: 9.152/km^{2} (23.70/sq mi)
- Time zone: UTC−3 (BRT)
- Postal code: 76700-000

Mozarlândia is a municipality in north-central Goiás state, Brazil.

It is located in the Valley of the Araguaia River, 300 kilometers from the state capital, Goiânia, and is served by highways GO-164 and GO-334.

The distance to Goiânia is 313 km. Highway connections are made by GO-070 / Goianira / Inhumas / Itaberaí / BR-070 / Goiás / GO-164 / Araguapaz / GO-347.

It forms its northern boundary with the municipality of Nova Crixás; its western boundary with Aruanã; its southern boundary with Araguapaz; and its eastern boundary with Crixás.

The main rivers that bathe the municipality are the Rio Tesouras and Rio do Peixe, besides the streams (córregos) of Alagadinho, Alagado, São João, Fogueira, Barreirinho, do Gato, Lagoinha, do Buriti, do Manoel and Muquém. Because of the flat topography near the main rivers, there are places that have a rich formation in lakes: Landi, Lolito, Pedra, Correia, da Onça, da Mãe, Redondo, Cabaça and many others. The mountains that stand out are Constantino, Pimenta, Pouso Alto, Jiripoca, Tombador and Bananal and the hills of São João and Engano.

The European history of this town began in 1952 when the surveyors Pedro Leite da Silva, Mozart de Andrade Mota, and Edgar de Alencar Mota set up camp near the confluence of the Barreirinho and Fogueira rivers, to survey the land for an agricultural colony called "Barreirinho e São João". Mota bought land and created lots to build a settlement. In 1954 the first hut was built and soon other settlers arrived form the state of Minas Gerais. The first name was "Barreirinho". In 1956 working together the settlers opened a road to Nova América so they could get their agricultural products to market. In 1958 Barreirinho became a district in the municipality of Goiás, the name changing to Mozarlândia, in homage to Mozart Andrade Mota who had distributed land to settlers and ranchers who wanted to stay in the area. Mota was mayor for two terms and in his administrations he carried out important works, like the building of the city hall, the public jail, and two plazas. He donated land to schools, churches, the city hall, the aerodrome, and the cemetery. He brought electricity and built the first schools. He died in 1993 remembered by his fellow citizens in the name of the town where he lived.

In January 2005 the Mayor was João Soares de Oliveira and the Vice-mayor was Mailton de Oliveira Souza. The city council had 9 members and there were 10,258 eligible voters in 2007.

In 2007 the population density was 7.57 inhabitants/km^{2}. In 2007 the urban population was 10,832 and the rural population was 2,291. The population has increased by more than 3,000 people since 1980. From 1996 to 2007 the geometric population increase was 2.33.%.

With an economy based on cattle raising, Mozarlândia has one of the largest packing houses in the country. The biggest exporter of meat from Brazil and the second in Latin America, the Frigorífico Bertin, installed two years ago in the town, has the capacity to slaughter 1,500 head per day. The meat is exported to Egypt, United States, Chile, and Iran. Flour, meat, bone, and blood are all processed. The leather is sent in a natural state to a tanner in São Luís de Montes Belos.

In 2007 there were 10 industrial units and 152 retail units in the city. The banking sector was represented by three banks. In 2007 there were 952 automobiles. The sector employing more workers was the transformation industry with 1,222 workers, followed by commerce with 344 workers (IBGE data from 2005).

- Farms: 332
- Total agricultural Area: 414,016 hectares
- Permanent Planted Area: 192 hectares
- Temporary Planted Area: 47,268 hectares
- Natural Pasture: 266,565 hectares
- Woodland and Forest: 93,960 hectares
- Workers related to the farm owner: 533
- Workers not related to the farm owner: 333 (IBGE)
- Cattle herd: 176,580 head (2006)
- Main crops: rice (60 hectares), rubber (81 hectares), and corn (300 hectares). (All data are from IBGE 2006)

In 2007 there were 2 hospitals (1 private) with 33 beds and 2 walk-in health clinics. The infant mortality rate was 28.8 in every 1,000 live births in 2000, which was below the national rate of 35.0 in the same year. In 2006 the school system had 9 schools, 72 classrooms, 136 teachers, and 3,787 students. Included were 2 middle schools, one public and one private. There were no institutions of higher learning. IN 2000 the adult literacy rate was 84.2%, below the national average of 86.4% in the same year.

One of the most awaited yearly events is the Agro-cattle Exposition, which occurs in August. An average of 15,000 visitors come to the town for the four days the festivities last.

The score on the Municipal Human Development Index was 0.768. This was a state ranking of 41 (out of 242 municipalities) and a national ranking of 1,372 (out of 5,507 municipalities). On the Seplan Economic Development Index of 2001 the ranking was 92 out of 246 municipalities. See Seplan. On the Seplan Social Development Index of 2000 the ranking was 149 out of 246 municipalities. See Seplan

== See also ==
- List of municipalities in Goiás
