= São Miguel do Araguaia =

- Municipality
- The Municipality of São Miguel do Araguaia
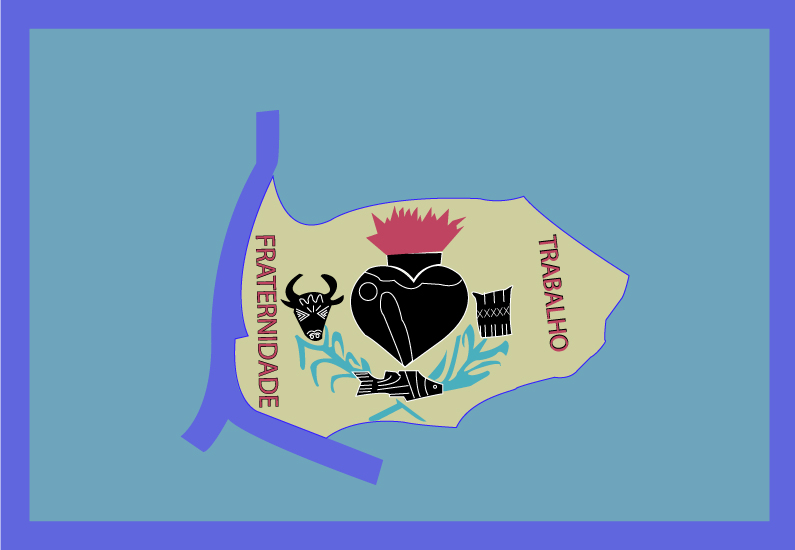
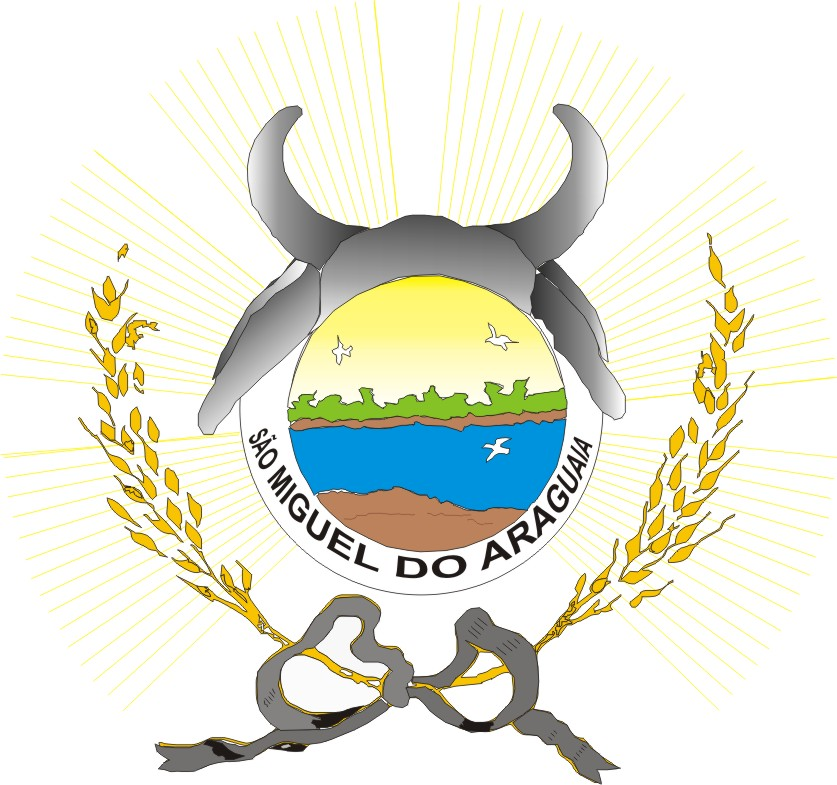
- Flag Coat of arms

- Location of São Miguel do Araguaia in Goiás
- Coordinates: 13°17′20″S 50°09′15″W
- Country: Brazil
- Region: Central-West
- State: Goiás
- Founded: November 14, 1958

Government
  - Mayor: Azaíde Borges

Area
  - Total: 6,144.380 km^{2} (2,372.358 sq mi)
- Elevation: 378.08 m (1,240.4 ft)

Population (2022)
  - Total: 21,900
  - Density: 3.56/km^{2} (9.2/sq mi)
- Time zone: UTC−3 (BRT)
- HDI (2000): 0.737 – medium
- Website: saomigueldoaraguaia.go.gov.br

São Miguel do Araguaia is a city in northwest Goiás state, Brazil. It is the northernmost municipality in Goiás, one of the largest too, and a major producer of cattle.

São Miguel is located in the São Miguel do Araguaia Microregion and is one of the most distant cities from the state capital, Goiânia, which is 486 kilometers away. There are highway connections with Araguaçu, state of Tocantins, 63 kilometers to the north; Nova Crixás, 102 kilometers to the south; and Luiz Alves, 45 kilometers to the west, on the Araguaia River.

Highway connections are made from Goiânia by GO-070 / Goianira / Inhumas / Itaberaí / BR-070 / Goiás / GO-164 / Araguapaz / Nova Crixás.

== History ==
The region received its first settlers in 1952 with the arrival of José Pereira do Nascimento, Lozorik Belem, and Ovídio Martins de Souza who bought large areas of land and began to raise cattle. José Pereira do Nascimento was a Spiritualist healer and attracted people seeking a cure for their ills. Soon a small settlement began to grow on the banks of the São Miguel River, called São Miguel. Soon the government surveyed the land and demarcated lots for distribution to new farmers coming from the south of the state of Minas Gerais. In 1958 it passed directly from district to municipality with its present name. The greatest period of growth was in the 1960s when thousands of settlers arrived from the south of the country receiving free land to settle in the region.

In 2007 the urban population was 18,202 while the rural population was 4,266. The population growth rate from 1996/2007 was 0.56%. There was a gain of about 2,200 people since 1980.

The economy is based on subsistence agriculture, cattle raising, services, public administration, and small transformation industries. The cattle herd is one of the largest in the state. Most of the farm land is used for cattle raising. In 2007 there were 21 industrial units and 221 commercial units. There were 06 banks.

- Farms: 1,005
- Total agricultural Area: 524,580 hectares
- Permanent Planted Area: 192 hectares
- Perennial Planted Area: 1,027 hectares
- Natural Pasture: 411,405 hectares
- Woodland and Forest: 108,622 hectares
- Workers related to the farm owner: 2,224
- Workers not related to the farm owner: 707 (IBGE)
- Cattle herd: 483,000 head (2006)
- Main crops: rice (1,400 hectares) corn (700 hectares), and soybeans (1,000 hectares). (All data are from IBGE 2006)

== Education ==
In the educational sector there were 21 schools with 6,684 students (2006). Higher education was represented by the UEG - Faculdade de Educação, Agronomia e Veterinária de São Miguel do Araguaia. The adult literacy rate was 83.1% (2000) (national average was 86.4%). In the health sector there were 04 hospitals with 92 beds (2007). The infant mortality rate was 25.62 (2000) (national average was 33.0)

== Tourism ==
Tourism is concentrated in the settlement of Luís Alves on the Araguaia River, where there are several small hotels. The population of 800 grows to 30,000 in the months of June and July when the waters of the river go down, revealing kilometers of white sands.

In 2000 São Miguel was ranked 0.737 on the United Nations Human Development Index and was 120 out of 242 municipalities in the state. It was 2,257 out of 5,507 municipalities in the country. (All data are from 2000). For the complete list see. On the Seplan Economic Development Index the ranking was 139 out of 246 municipalities. See Seplan. On the Seplan Social Development Index the ranking was 175 out of 246 municipalities. See Seplan

== Cultural events ==
=== Culturarte ===
Culturarte is a Culture Encounter Fair, where handicrafts, typical foods and regional music are exhibited.

=== Folia de Reis ===
The groups of revelers from São Miguel do Araguaia, Companhia dos Três Reis Santos, organized by the announcer Frank Júnior, and the company led by Mr. João Batista known as "Tista" are the two groups that keep the folia culture alive and represent the region in the state and national gatherings of revelers.

=== Carnaraguaia ===
Carnaraguaia is an off-season carnival that takes place annually on the banks of the Araguaia River during the holiday season, in the month of July in the Luiz Alves district.

The party offers shows by nationally known artists and bands, such as: Companhia do Pagode, Banda Nechevile and Léo Santana.

=== Festival de Música de São Miguel do Araguaia ===
Conceived by the then radio broadcaster and later elected councilor, Sinomar Moreira Da Silva, better known as Maradona, the São Miguel do Araguaia music festival took place annually on the 10th to the 14th of November, coinciding with the municipality's anniversary. There are five days of festivity that attracts musicians and singers from different municipalities to interpret music from various genres: MPB, Sertanejo and Gospel.

Most of the region's musicians started from the festival. An example of this is in the list of winners of 2011 that includes the singers: Grasielly Silva (gospel) and Negra Jane (MPB), the singers: Cassius Alessandro (lead singer of the forro band, Swing da Cohab) and Juninho do Araguaia and even the guitarist Silvio Dias (from the rock band Rotta SMA). But even with all its artistic potential and cultural importance for the region, the festival stopped being held as soon as its creator died.

=== Araguaia Rock ===
Araguaia Rock is a music festival that arose from the union of a group of friends who decided to change the local musical culture and break the musical monopoly. The festival is focused on independent and authorial alternative rock. The festival's DEMO edition took place on the banks of the Araguaia River in the Luiz Alves district, on July 13, 2017, as part of the holiday season and had the help of the municipality's tourism office. The attractions of this festival's DEMO edition were the bands: Rotta SMA, MC do Morro and PedRon (São Miguel do Araguaia), Casulo Fantasma (Uruaçu) and Lobinho e Os Três Porcão (Goiânia).

It was on October 7, 2017 that the first official edition of the festival took place. The sequence of shows was opened with the rapper MC do Morro, followed by the rock bands: Casulo Fantasma, Lobinho e os 3 Porcão, Rotta SMA / PedRon, Almost Down and Sheena Ye.

In addition to the shows, the festival also featured snack stands and even plastic artists presenting their creative work live. The event once again had the support of the City Hall, Secretariat of Tourism and local commerce.

== Policy ==
The municipality is administered by a mayor elected through a vote and its work is supervised by the City Council, which is made up of 11 members also chosen by the residents through the vote.

In 2016, doctor Nélio Cunha, who had Azaíde Borges as deputy mayor, was elected mayor of São Miguel do Araguaia with 5,956 votes (42.24%).

In 2019, Nélio Cunha resigned and his deputy Azaíde assumed the majority position, in the same year, the then former mayor, ended up being arrested by the Federal Police suspected of being part of an international drug trafficking ring.

In 2020, Azaíde Borges, who already held the position in the city hall due to the resignation of her predecessor, is elected mayor with 58.78% of the valid votes.

== See also ==
- List of municipalities in Goiás
