= Microregion of Rio Vermelho =

Coordinates: 15°56′02″S 50°08′24″W

Rio Vermelho
- Microregion
- Location in Goias state
- Country: Brazil
- State: Goiás
- Mesoregion: Noroeste Goiano
- Municipalities: 9

Area
  - Total: 20,277.10 km^{2} (7,829.03 sq mi)

Population (2012)
  - Total: 87,890
  - Density: 4.334/km^{2} (11.23/sq mi)

The Rio Vermelho Microregion is a geographical region in central Goiás state, Brazil. The most important city is Goiás, also known as Goiás Velho, the only World Heritage Site in the state of Goiás. It takes its name from the Vermelho River, a tributary of the Araguaia River that flows through the region. The region features varied geography, with rugged terrain in the south and low watery lands in the north.

== Municipalities ==
The microregion consists of the following municipalities:

- Araguapaz--7,482
- Aruanã--6,476
- Britânia--5,073
- Faina--6,918
- Goiás--24,472
- Itapirapuã--8,208
- Jussara--18,814
- Matrinchã--4,325
- Santa Fé de Goiás--4,594

Population figures are from 2007 and are from Sepin, the former name of a government department responsible for collecting socioeconomic data.

== See also ==
- List of municipalities in Goiás
- Microregions of Goiás
