= Jussara =

- Municipality
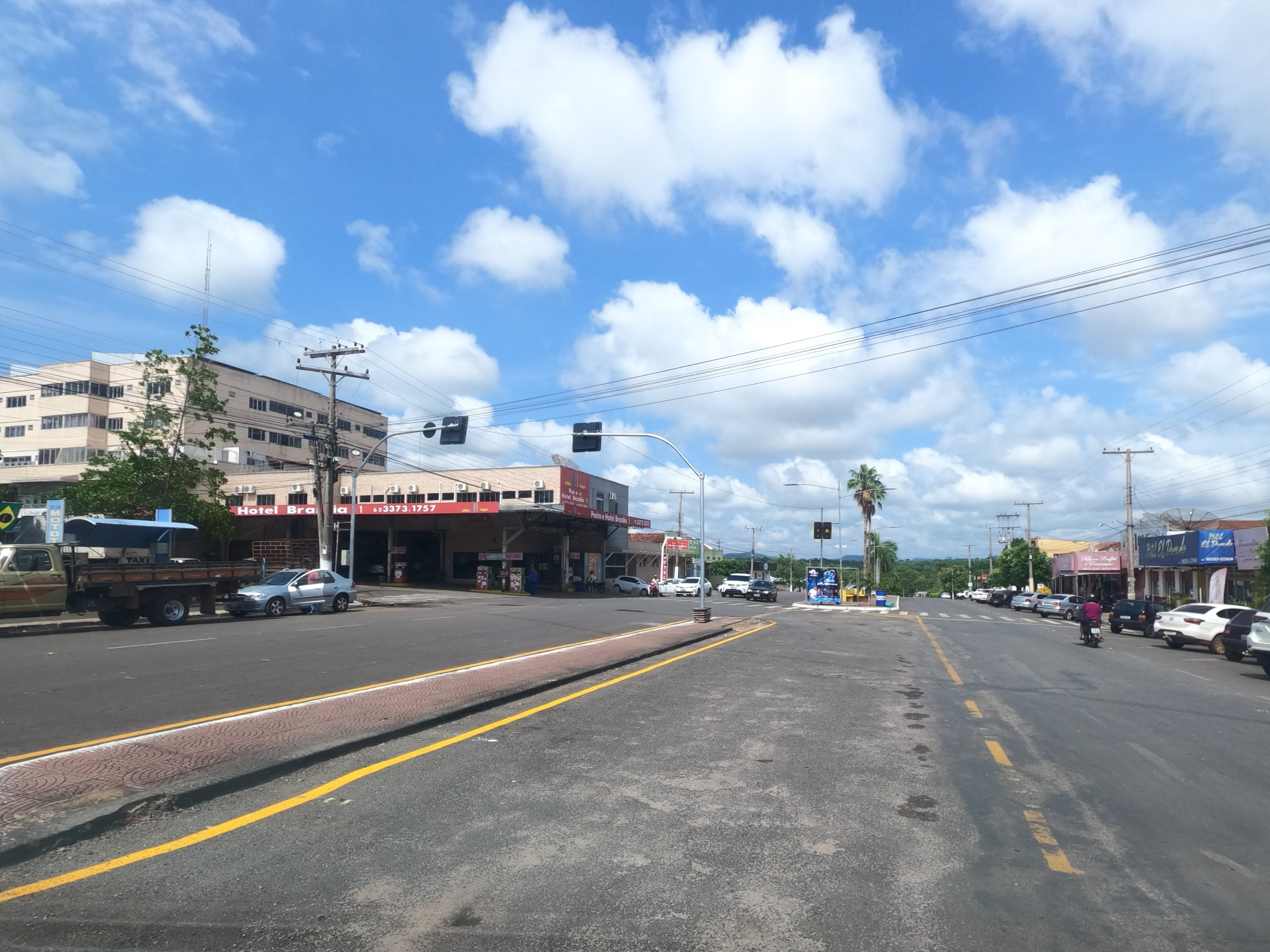

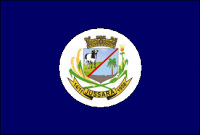
- Flag

- Location in Goiás state

- Location in Brazil
- Coordinates: 15°51′51″S 50°51′08″W
- Country: Brazil
- Region: Central-West
- State: Goiás
- Microregion: Rio Vermelho Microregion

Area
  - Total: 4,092.4 km^{2} (1,580.1 sq mi)
- Elevation: 317 m (1,040 ft)

Population (2020)
  - Total: 18,371
  - Density: 4.4891/km^{2} (11.627/sq mi)
- Time zone: UTC−3 (BRT)
- Postal code: 76270-000

Jussara is a municipality in Goiás state, Brazil. Jussara is a major producer of cattle for the beef market.

== Location and history ==
Jussara is located in the region of the Vale do Araguaia, 222 kilometers from the state capital of Goiânia. Highway communications are made with Goiânia by GO-060 / Trindade, Goiás / Claudinápolis / GO-326 / Anicuns / Sanclerlândia / Novo Brasil / GO-324. Sepin

The town began as the Agricultural Colony of Água Limpa, belonging to the city of Goiás. In 1950 the name was changed to Jussara in tribute to Jussara Marques, the first woman from Goiás to be elected Miss Brasil. In 1958 it was dismembered from Goiás and elevated to a municipality.

Today it borders the municipalities of Britânia, Montes Claros de Goiás, Fazenda Nova, Santa Fé de Goiás, Novo Brasil and Itapirapuã and is crossed by highways BR-070 and by GOs 324 and 418.

== Climate and geography ==
The climate is typically tropical with high temperatures, between 35 and 38 degrees. The city forms part of the Amazon basin, being made up of the Samambaia, Água Limpa, Araguaia, Molha Biscoito and Palmeira rivers. Its vegetation is characterized by forest and cerrado. The tourist area takes in the area of the Araguaia River, with its natural environment, beaches, flora and fauna.

== Political data ==
- Mayor: Joaquim Alves de Castro Neto (January 2005)
- Vice-mayor: Ismael Caetano Martins
- Number of councilmembers: 9

== Demographic data ==
- Population density: 4.60 inhabitants/km^{2} (2007)
- Population in 1980: 22,520
- Population in 1991: 20,917
- Population in 2007: 18,814 (14,995 urban and 3,819 rural)
- Population growth rate 1991/1996: -0.65.%
- Population growth rate 1991/2000: -0.48.%
- Population growth rate 2000/2007: -0.89.%

== Economy ==
The economy is based on modest commerce, public employment, small transformation industries, cattle raising, and agriculture. There is an industrial district and a dairy.

The soil is very fertile and lends itself to agriculture with emphasis on the planting of rice, beans, corn, manioc, sweet potato, cotton, and soybeans, among others. The subsoil is rich in minerals like cassiterite, nickel, and chromium. Cattle raising is also practiced with one of the largest herds in the state (388,000). Cheese and milk products are manufactured locally. There are also brick factories producing floor tiles, bricks and roof tiles.

=== Economic data ===
- Number of Industrial Establishments: 42 (06/2007)
- Industrial District: Distrito Agroindustrial - DAIJU (June/2006)
- Dairies: Laticínios Morrinhos Indústria e Comércio Ltda (05/2006)
- Banking Establishments: - Banco do Brasil S.A. - BRADESCO S.A. - Banco Itaú S.A. - CEF.
- Number of Retail Commercial Establishments: 287 (August/2007)

=== Main crops in planted area (2006) ===
- Cotton: 1,600 hectares
- Beans: 3,200 hectares
- Soybeans: 4,650 hectares
- Modest production of manioc, sesame, oranges, sugarcane, and rubber

== Education (2006) ==
- Schools in activity: 27 with 5,470 students (a decline in enrollment of around 1,500 students since 2000)
- Higher education: UEG - Faculdade de Educação, Ciências e Letras de Jussara, Faculdade de Jussara
- Literacy Rate: 84.9%

== Health (2007) ==
- Hospitals: 1 with 92 beds
- Infant mortality rate: 26.34 (in 1,000 live births)
- MHDI: 0.740
- State ranking: 104 (out of 242 municipalities in 2000)
- National ranking: 2,145 (out of 5,507 municipalities in 2000)
