= Santa Fé de Goiás =

- Municipality
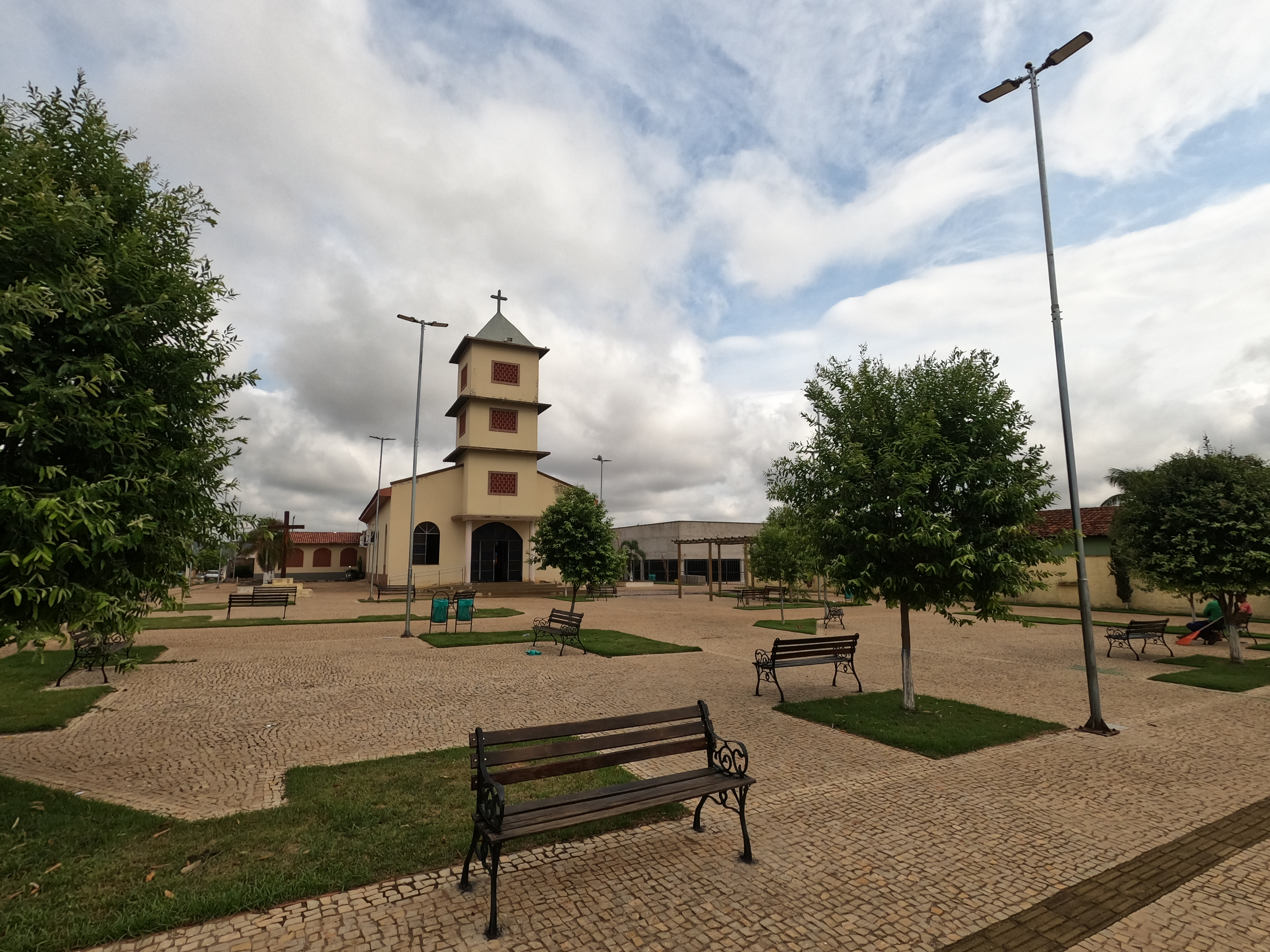

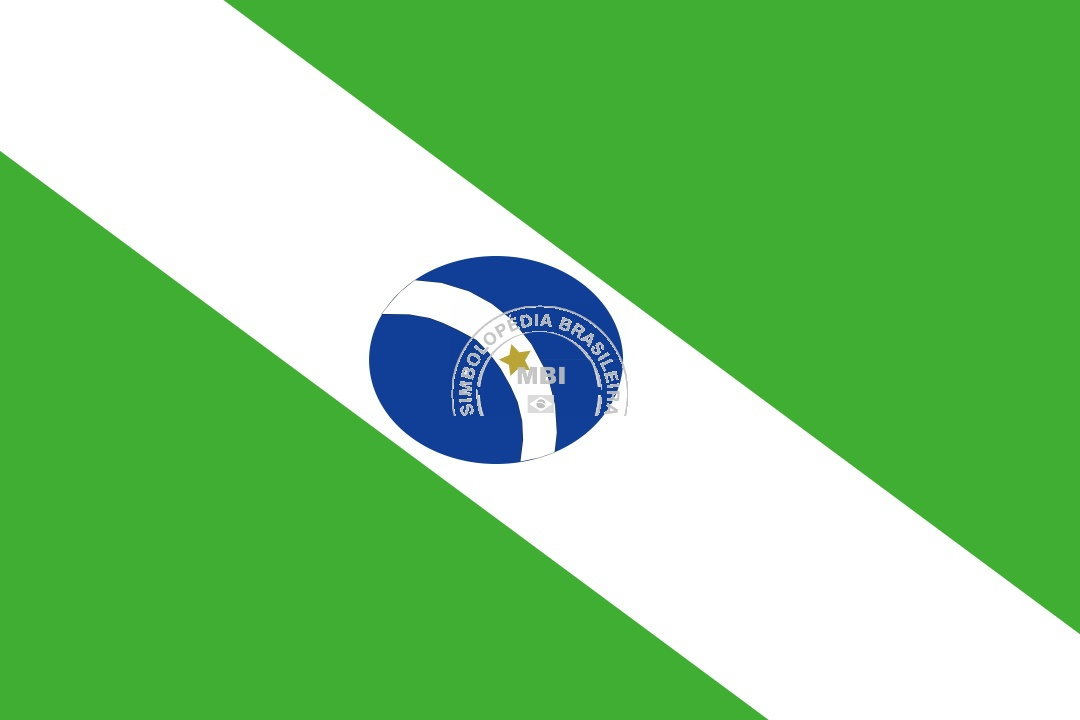
- Flag

- Location in Goiás state

- Location in Brazil
- Coordinates: 15°46′12″S 51°05′45″W
- Country: Brazil
- Region: Central-West
- State: Goiás
- Microregion: Rio Vermelho Microregion

Area
  - Total: 1,160.8 km^{2} (448.2 sq mi)
- Elevation: 362 m (1,188 ft)

Population (2010)
  - Total: 4,762
  - Density: 4.102/km^{2} (10.63/sq mi)
- Time zone: UTC−3 (BRT)
- Postal code: 76265-000

Santa Fé de Goiás is a municipality in the west-central Brazilian state of Goiás.

== Location ==
Santa Fé is located almost directly west of Brasília and northwest of Goiânia. The nearest town, Jussara, lies 34 km to the southeast.

- Distance to regional center (Goiás Velho): 132 km.
- Highway connections: GO-060 / Trindade / GO-326 / Anicuns / Sanclerlândia / Novo Brasil / Jussara / BR-070 / Nova Trindade / GO-173.

Neighboring municipalities: Jussara, Britânia, Itapirapuã

== Politics ==
- Mayor: Ademar Marques de Carvalho (January 2005)
- City council: 09
- Eligible voters: 3,885 (December 2007)

In 1957, Santa Fé de Goiás became a district belonging to Goiás. In 1958, it was dismembered to become a district in the municipality of Jussara. In 1988, it got its municipal autonomy.

== Demographics ==
- Population density: 3.96 inhabitants/km^{2} (2007)
- Urban population: 3,514 (2007)
- Rural population: 1,080 (2007)
- Population growth: a gain of about 900 people since 1991

== Economy ==
The economy is based on subsistence agriculture, cattle raising, services, public administration, and small transformation industries.

- Industrial units: 6 (2007)
- Commercial units: 57 (2007)
- Meat-packing plant: Frigorífico Arantes Ltda
- Cattle herd: 135,000 head
- Main crops: cotton, rice, sugarcane, bananas, sesame seeds, corn, and soybeans.
- Motor vehicles: 231 automobiles, 34 trucks, and 37 pickup trucks (2007)

== Education (2006) ==
- Schools: 5
- Classrooms: 30
- Teachers: 60
- Students: 1,314
- Higher education: none
- Adult literacy rate: 83.7% (2000) (national average was 86.4%)

== Health (2003) ==
- Hospitals: 0
- Hospital beds: 0
- Ambulatory clinics: 2
- Doctors, nurses, dentists: 3, 1, 1 (2002)
- Infant mortality rate: 26.34 per 1,000 live births (2000) (national average was 33.0 per 1,000 live births)
- MHDI: 0.713
- State ranking: 190 (out of 242 municipalities)
- National ranking: 2,744 (out of 5,507 municipalities)

== See also ==
- List of municipalities in Goiás
- Microregions of Goiás
