= Marco Tulio =

Marco Tulio may refer to:

- Marco Túlio (footballer, born 1981), Brazilian football midfielder
- Marco Túlio (footballer, born March 1998), Brazilian football forward
- Marco Túlio (footballer, born May 1998), Brazilian football left-back
- Marco Túlio, Brazilian musician, guitarist for Jota Quest

== See also ==
- Marcos Túlio (born 1992), Brazilian football defensive midfielder
