= Itapirapuã =

- Municipality
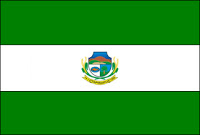
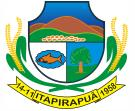
- Flag Coat of arms

- Location in Goiás state

- Location in Brazil
- Coordinates: 15°49′33″S 50°36′4″W
- Country: Brazil
- Region: Central-West
- State: Goiás
- Microregion: Rio Vermelho

Area
  - Total: 2,044 km^{2} (789 sq mi)
- Elevation: 348 m (1,142 ft)

Population (2020)
  - Total: 4,685
  - Density: 2.292/km^{2} (5.936/sq mi)
- Time zone: UTC−3 (BRT)

Itapirapuã is a municipality in the state of Goiás in Brazil. The population is 4,685 (2020 est.) in an area of 2,044 km^{2}. Itapirapuã is a large producer of cattle.

== Location and boundaries ==
Highway communications with Goiânia are made by GO-070 / Goianira / Inhumas / Itaberaí / BR-070 / Goiás / Uvá. See Sepin for all the distances.

Municipal boundaries:

- North: Britânia and Matrinchã
- South: Novo Brasil
- West: Santa Fé de Goiás and Jussara
- East: Goiás

== Demographic data ==
The population growth rate from 2000 to 2007 was -3.92%. This showed a marked decline when compared to previous data. Out of the total population 5,656 were considered urban (2007).

== Economic data ==
Cattle raising, services, small industries, and agriculture are the main economic activities.

- Number of industrial establishments: 07 (/06/2007)
- Dairies: Cooperativa Mista Agropecuária de Itapirapuã Ltda (22/05/2006)
- Banking Establishments: - Banco do Brasil S.A (01/08/2007)
- Number of Retail Commercial Establishments: 71 (August/2007)

=== Agriculture ===
There were 243,500 head of cattle in 2006, one of the largest herds in the state. The main crops in planted area were bananas, beans, corn, manioc, rice, and soybeans. None exceeded 1,000 hectares in planted area.

== Education (2006) ==
- Schools in activity: 15
- Total Students: 2,457
- Literacy Rate: 82.5%

== Health (2007) ==
- Hospitals: 1 with 17 beds
- Infant mortality rate: 28.53 (in 1,000 live births)
- MHDI: 0.707
- State ranking: 203 (out of 242 municipalities in 2000)
- National ranking: 2,880 (out of 5,507 municipalities in 2000)

== History ==
Settlement began in 1892 with the building of an army telegraph line and station between the city of Goiás (then the state capital) and Mato Grosso, breaking the isolation of the area. The name chosen was Itapirapuã, meaning "white stone from the pool of the fish", because it was near a deep pool in the river where a whirlpool was formed around a white stone. After half a century of stagnation the settlement received a push forward with the selling by the local government of lots to new settlers. In 1953 it became a district of Goiás, and in 1959 it separated from Goiás and became an independent municipality.

== See also ==
- List of municipalities in Goiás
