= Faina, Goiás =

Faina
- Municipality
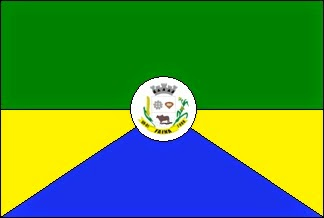
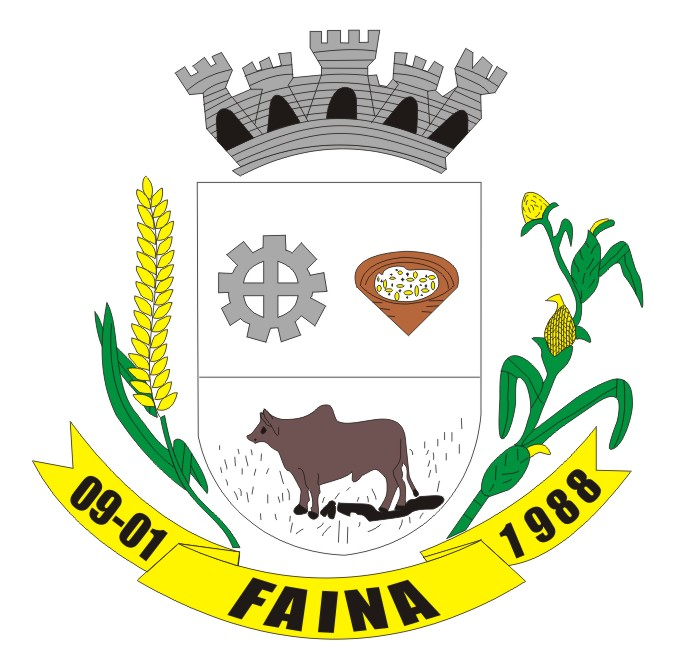
- Flag Coat of arms

- Location in Goiás state

- Location in Brazil
- Coordinates: 15°26′52″S 50°22′06″W
- Country: Brazil
- Region: Central-West
- State: Goiás
- Microregion: Rio Vermelho Microregion

Government
  - Mayor: Paulo Roberto Vieira

Area
  - Total: 1,949.7 km^{2} (752.8 sq mi)
- Elevation: 360 m (1,180 ft)

Population (2022)
  - Total: 7,070
  - Density: 3.63/km^{2} (9.39/sq mi)
- Time zone: UTC−3 (BRT)
- Postal code: 76740-000
- Website: Official website

Faina is a municipality in central-west Goiás state, Brazil. The population in 2022 was 7,070 within a total area of 1,949.7 square kilometres (752.8 sq mi).

== History ==
In 1952, explorers Lino Nascimento de Souza and Evaristo Seabra Guimarães entered the region of Goiás in search of new land to settle. After being advised to follow the path by Bornerges Alencastro Veiga, they arrived in an area near the Faina stream, which was already inhabited by Maria Celestina Ferreira de Brito's family. After further investigations, they returned to the Capim Puba Farm to collect their relatives. On 15 July 1955, the explorers opened access roads to the area for nine families. They were joined the following year by another pioneer, Lindolfo Mendes da Cunha.

== Location ==
Faina is located on the latitude of -15.43697 and longitude of -50.39151, 218 km from Goiânia in the central-west area of the state. It is part of the Rio Vermelho Microregion. The main highways are GO-070 Goianira-Itaberaí to the crossroads at Cidade de Goiás, and GO-164.

Municipal boundaries:

- North: Araguapaz
- South: Goiás
- East: Itapuranga
- West: Matrinchã

== Politics ==
- Mayor: Paulo Roberto Vieira (2022)
- Deputy Mayor: Ailton de Fátima da Mata (2021)
- Council Members: 9

== Demographics ==
- Population density (2022): 3.63 per square kilometre (9.4/sq mi)
- 2.5 residents per household in 2022
- Population growth rate 2010 to 2022: 1.25%
- Urban population in 2007: 3,862
- Rural population in 2007: 3,056

== Economic data ==
- Employed population in 2022: 10.99%
- GDP per capita in 2022: R$ 25,676.74.
- The main economic activities are cattle raising and agriculture (there were 146,000 head of cattle in 2006). In addition, Faina produces rice, corn, bananas, sugarcane, papaya and passion fruit.

== Education and health ==
- Literacy rate: 79.4%
- Infant mortality rate: 28.53 in 1,000 live births
- Schools: 19 with 2,288 students in 2006
- Hospitals: 2 with 29 beds in 2007
- State ranking: 127 (out of 246 municipalities in 2022)
- National ranking: 3,628 (out of 5,570 municipalities in 2022)

=== Xeroderma pigmentosum in Araras ===
In the village of Araras, located within the municipality, a significant percentage of the population harbors the autosomal recessive gene causing degrees of the variant form of xeroderma pigmentosum, an inherited condition causing decreased ability to repair DNA damage such as that caused by ultraviolet (UV) light, with tens of people exhibiting the full spectrum of symptoms. The gene originated with a few European settlers who arrived in the area sometime in the 18th or 19th century. A high degree of consanguinous marriages resulted in an increased incidence of the condition for children conceived by those marriages. Approximately 1 in 40 people in Araras and 1 in 410 people in the municipality of Faina show the full spectrum of symptoms, a far greater incidence than average.

== Tourism ==
There are several waterfalls in the area, including Cachoeira das Três Quedas, which has a fall of 50 metres (160 ft). There is also a cavern 120 metres (390 ft) deep with several large chambers containing both stalagmites and stalactites.

== See also ==
- List of municipalities in Goiás
