= Procession of the Fogaréu =

Brazilian religious festival

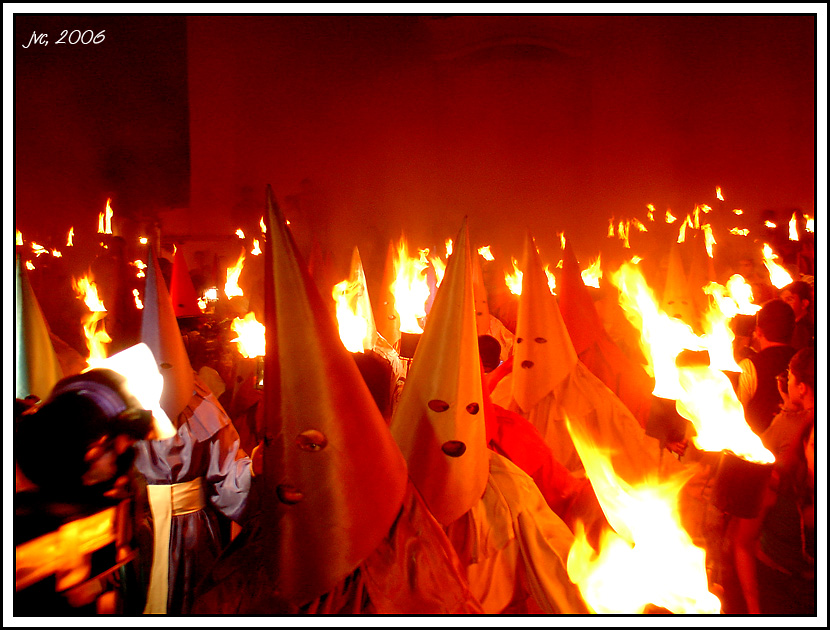
Procession of the Fogaréu in Goiás Velho

The Fogaréu Procession is a traditional Catholic procession held annually in some cities in Brazil during Holy Week.

Procession of the Fogaréu was introduced in Goiás by the Spanish priest Perestelo de Vasconcelos, in 1745.

== How it is performed in Brazil ==
The procession reenacts the impeachment and arrest of Jesus Christ. The route varies from city to city, as does the day of Holy Week on which it takes place. Traditionally, dozens of farricocos dressed in special attire and carrying torches represent Roman soldiers.

They walk barefoot through the city streets. The attire worn by the farricocos is characterized by a long tunic of varying colors and a long, conical, pointed hood, bearing strong similarities to the garments still common in Holy Week celebrations in Spain. It is, in fact, a medieval costume, customarily worn by penitents who could thus atone for their sins without having to publicly reveal their identity.

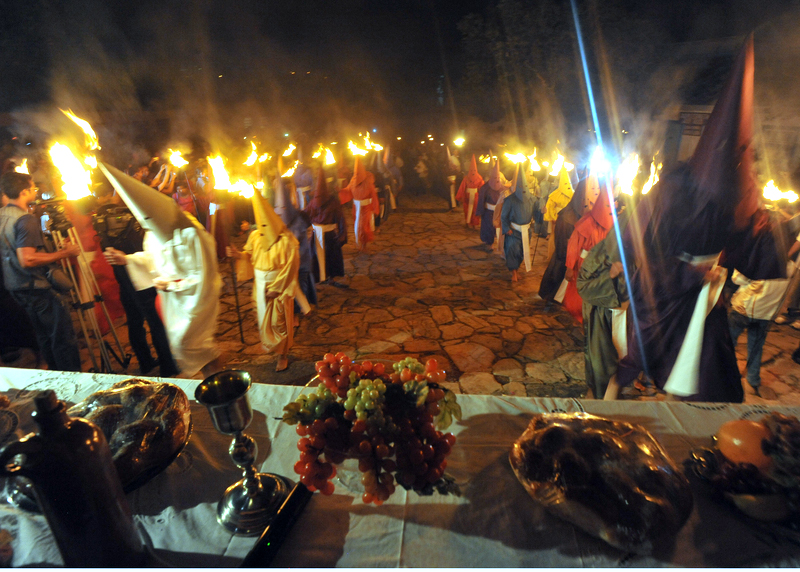
Image in the staging in the Brazil

During the procession, reenactments of the Roman soldiers' search for Jesus are usually performed, but the style varies from city to city. In the city of Goiás (GO), a pioneer of the celebration in Brazil, for example, the procession begins at midnight on Holy Thursday, with the streetlights turned off and drums beating, at the door of the Igreja da Boa Morte church in the city's main square. A crowd of worshippers, tourists, and locals watch the spectacle, marching alongside the "farricocos" toward the steps of the Church of Our Lady of the Rosary, where they find the table of the Last Supper already dispersed. They then advance toward the Church of Saint Francis of Paula, which symbolizes the Garden of Olives, where Christ's arrest took place. This is represented by a linen banner painted on two sides, the work of nineteenth-century artist Veiga Valle.
