= Araguapaz =

- Municipality
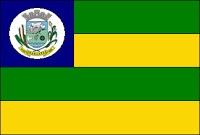
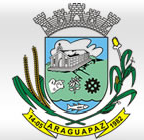
- Flag Coat of arms

- Location in Goiás state

- Location in Brazil
- Coordinates: 15°05′24″S 50°37′38″W
- Country: Brazil
- Region: Central-West
- State: Goiás

Area
  - Total: 2,194 km^{2} (847 sq mi)

Population (2020)
  - Total: 7,783
  - Density: 3.547/km^{2} (9.188/sq mi)
- Time zone: UTC−3 (BRT)

Araguapaz is a municipality in northwestern Goiás state, Brazil. The population is 7,783 (2020) in a total area of 2,194 km^{2}. It is a major producer of cattle.

== Location and Municipal Boundaries ==
Araguapaz is located 268 kilometers northwest of the state capital, Goiânia, in the Rio Vermelho Microregion. Connections with Goiânia are made by highways GO-070 / Goianira / Itaberaí / Goiás / GO-164 / Faina. Highway GO-530 continues northwest for 53 kilometers to Aruanã on the Araguaia River.

Municipal boundaries:

- North: Mozarlândia
- South: Faina
- East: Morro Agudo de Goiás
- West: Aruanã and Matrinchã

It is in the mini-basin of the Rio do Peixe, a tributary of the Araguaia River. Another important river in the region is the Tesouras.

== Demographic and Political Data ==
- Population density: 3.41 inhabitants/km^{2} (2007)
- Population growth rate 2000/2007: 0.33%
- Urban population: 5,218
- Rural population: 2,264
- Eligible voters: 5,676 (12/2007)
- City government in 2005: mayor (José Segundo Rezende Júnior), vice-mayor (Margareth Alves Irineu Luciano), and 09 council members

== Economic Information ==
The economy is practically dependent on the raising of cattle, especially fattening for the urban market. More than ninety percent of the landowners are from large urban areas like Goiânia and São Paulo. There were 164,640 cows in 2006, of which 7,100 were milk cows.

The main agricultural products were bananas, coconut, hearts of palm, pineapple, rice, manioc, corn (650 hectares), and soybeans.

- Financial institution in 2007: Bradesco S.A.

== Health and education ==
- Health establishments: 03 (2002)
- Hospitals: 01 with 07 beds
- Infant mortality rate (in 1,000 live births): 1990—31.02; 2000—21.09
- Schools: 09 with 2,036 students
- Higher education: none reporting
- Literacy rate: 1991—67.8; 2000—78.6
- MHDI: 0.729
- State ranking: 148 (out of 242 municipalities)
- National ranking: 2,453 (out of 5,507 municipalities)

== History ==
Until the 1960s the region was uninhabited. In 1961 Dolzane de Paulo Bastos, from Orizona, Goiás, entered the area with his companions and settled along the banks of the Córrego Cambuí, in a region called Cavalo Queimado. Dolzane and his group offered lots to anyone willing to build a house, and soon other pioneers arrived. By 1962 there were 11 huts made of palm fronds and a dirt road—really a cow path—to the capital Goiás, 120 kilometers away. By 1963 the settlement was raised to a district with the name Cavalo Queimado. Later the name was changed to São Joaquim do Araguaia, and later to Araguapaz, due to its proximity to the Rio Araguaia and the Córrego Isabel Paes. In 1970 the town began to grow with the construction of a road linking Goiás and São Miguel do Araguaia. This road was known as the Estrada dos Bois (the highway of the cows). Later a road was opened from Araguapaz to Aruanã, opening up possibilities of tourism. In 1982 Araguapaz was elevated to a municipality.

== See also ==
- List of municipalities in Goiás
