= Microregion of São Miguel do Araguaia =

Coordinates: 13°16′30″S 50°09′46″W

São Miguel do Araguaia
- Microregion
- Location in Goias state
- Country: Brazil
- State: Goiás
- Mesoregion: Noroeste Goiano
- Municipalities: 7

Area
  - Total: 24,471.80 km^{2} (9,448.61 sq mi)

Population (2012)
  - Total: 77,067
  - Density: 3.1/km^{2} (8.2/sq mi)

The São Miguel do Araguaia Microregion is a geographical region in northwest Goiás state, Brazil. The total population is 77,067 inhabitants (2012) in an area of 24,471.80 km^{2}.

== Municipalities ==
The microregion consists of the following municipalities:

- São Miguel do Araguaia
- Crixás
- Mozarlândia
- Mundo Novo
- Nova Crixás
- Novo Planalto
- Uirapuru

== See also ==
- List of municipalities in Goiás
- Microregions of Goiás
