= Britânia =

- Municipality
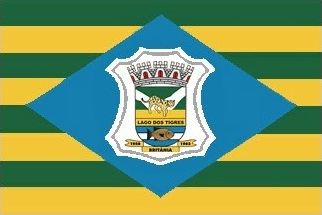
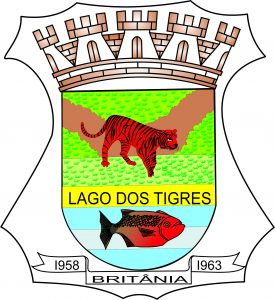
- Flag Coat of arms

- Location in Goiás state

- Location in Brazil
- Coordinates: 15°14′59″S 51°09′23″W
- Country: Brazil
- Region: Central-West
- State: Goiás
- Microregion: Rio Vermelho Microregion

Area
  - Total: 1,461.2 km^{2} (564.2 sq mi)
- Elevation: 263 m (863 ft)

Population (2020)
  - Total: 5,797
  - Density: 3.967/km^{2} (10.28/sq mi)
- Time zone: UTC−3 (BRT)
- Postal code: 76280-000

Britânia is a municipality in northwestern Goiás state, Brazil. The population was 5,797 (2020) in a total area of 1461.2 km^{2}.

== Municipal boundaries ==
Municipal boundaries:

- North: Aruanã
- South: Jussara
- East: Itapirapuã and Aruanã
- West: the state of Mato Grosso

== Highway connections ==
A paved highway connects Britânia with Santa Fé de Goiás and Jussara. Connections with Goiânia are made by highways GO-060 / Trindade / Claudinápolis / GO-326 / Anicuns / Sanclerlândia / Novo Brasil / GO-324 / Jussara / BR-070 / Nova Trindade / GO-173.

The main rivers are the Vermelho and the Araguaia. There are also several lakes, like the Tigrinho, Açará and the most important for tourist purposes, the Lago dos Tigres, which is used for fishing, water sports and swimming.

== Demographic and political data ==
- Population density in 2003: 3.47 inhabitants/km^{2}
- Population growth rate 2000-2007: -0.57%
- Urban population in 2007: 4,085
- Rural population in 2007: 988
- Eligible voters: 4,278
- City government: mayor (Rivadávia Jayme), vice-mayor (Estelila Maria dos Santos Azevedo), and 09 councilors

== Economic facts ==
The economy is based on cattle raising, agriculture, commerce (58 units), and some small transformation industries (11 units). Britânia had a herd of 155,400 in 2006, with 90% being the Nelore breed. The land is divided into large properties, which use little labor. Other important agricultural products are rice, sesame seeds, manioc, and corn.

- Financial institutions in 2004: 01—Bradesco S.A.

== Health ==
- Infant mortality rate in 2000: 26.34
- Infant mortality rate in 1990: 31.02
- Health installations: 05
- Hospitals: 02, with 59 beds in 2007

== Education ==
- Literacy rate in 2000: 83.2
- Literacy rate in 1991: 69.5
- Schools in activity: 09 with 1,721 students
- Higher education: none in 2005
- MHDI: 0.723
- State ranking: 164 (out of 242 municipalities)
- National ranking: 2,567 (out of 5,507 municipalities)

== History ==
In 1953 Paulo Carlos Schmidt de Vasconcelos, from São Paulo, bought lands from the government and staked out lots in an endeavour called "Loteamento Lago dos Tigres" next to the lake of the same name. In 1959 another Paulista, Írio Spinar, bought the land and began to sell lots to farmers, who mainly came from São Paulo or Paraná. The settlement grew and in 1958 it became a district of Jussara, later to become a municipality in 1963.

== See also ==
- List of municipalities in Goiás
