= Marcos Túlio =

Brazilian footballer

Personal information
- Full name: Marcos Túlio Valério
- Date of birth: 30 April 1992 (age 34)
- Place of birth: Aruanã, Brazil
- Height: 1.86 m (6 ft 1 in)
- Positions: Defender; midfielder

Team information
- Current team: Aparecidense

Youth career
- Atlético Goianiense

Senior career*
Years	Team	Apps	(Gls)
2012	União São João	2	(0)
2013–2014	Prudentópolis	2	(0)
2015	Rio Branco-PR	11	(1)
2015–	Aparecidense	8	(0)
2016–2017	→ União da Madeira (loan)	1	(0)
- * Club domestic league appearances and goals as of 20 August 2017

Marcos Túlio Valério (born 30 April 1992), or simply Marcos Túlio, is a Brazilian professional footballer who plays as a central midfielder for Aparecidense.
