= Goiás, Goiás =

Goiás
- Municipality
- Municipality of Goiás
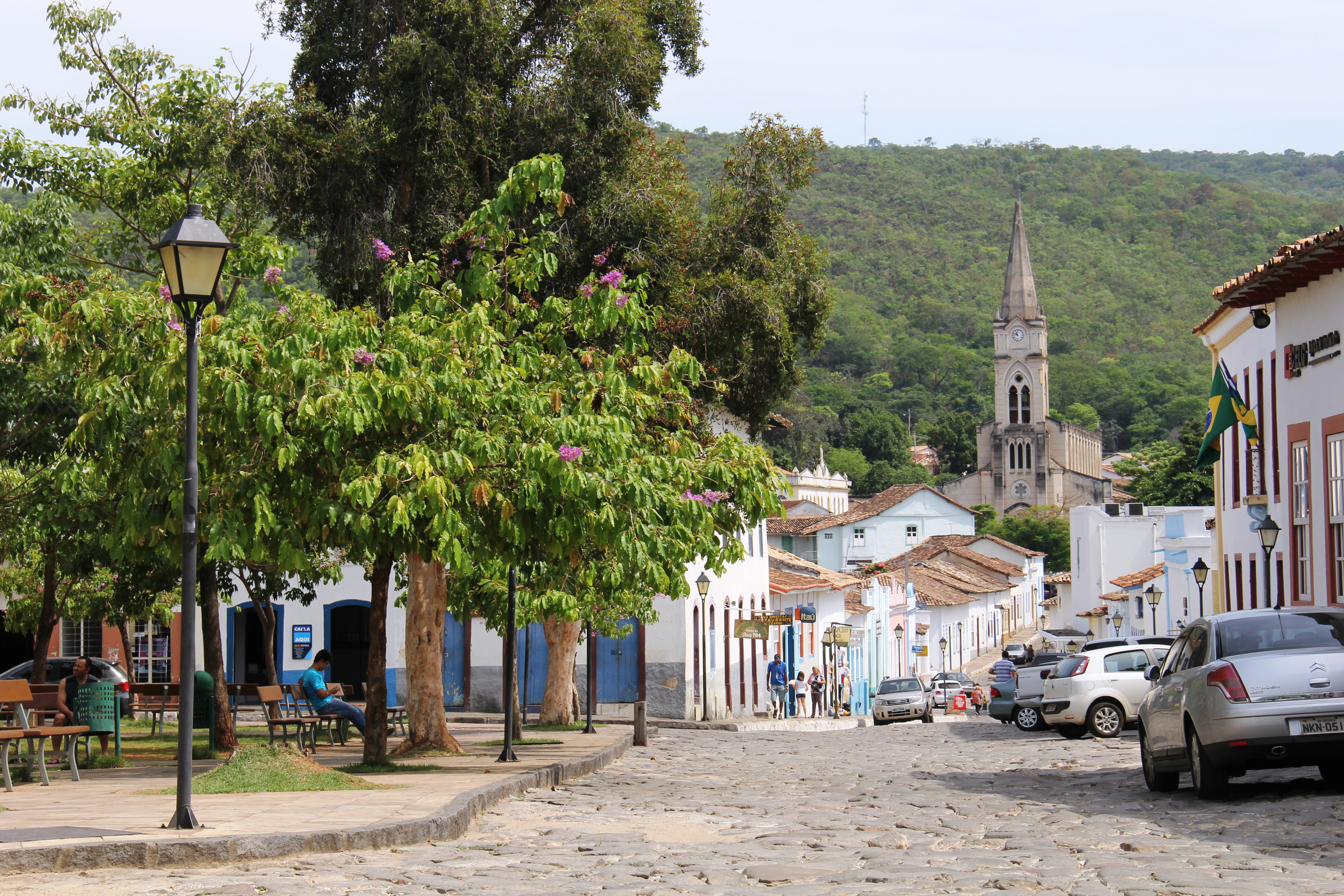
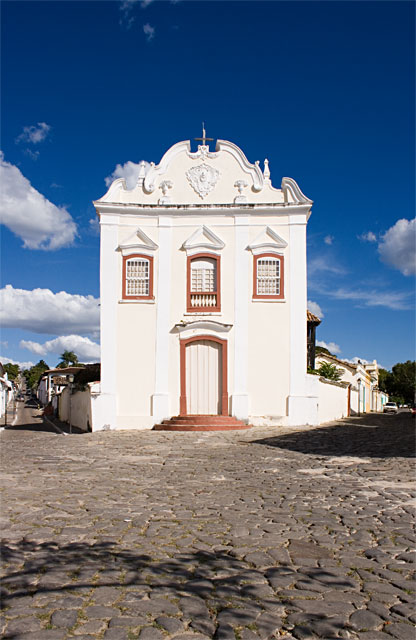
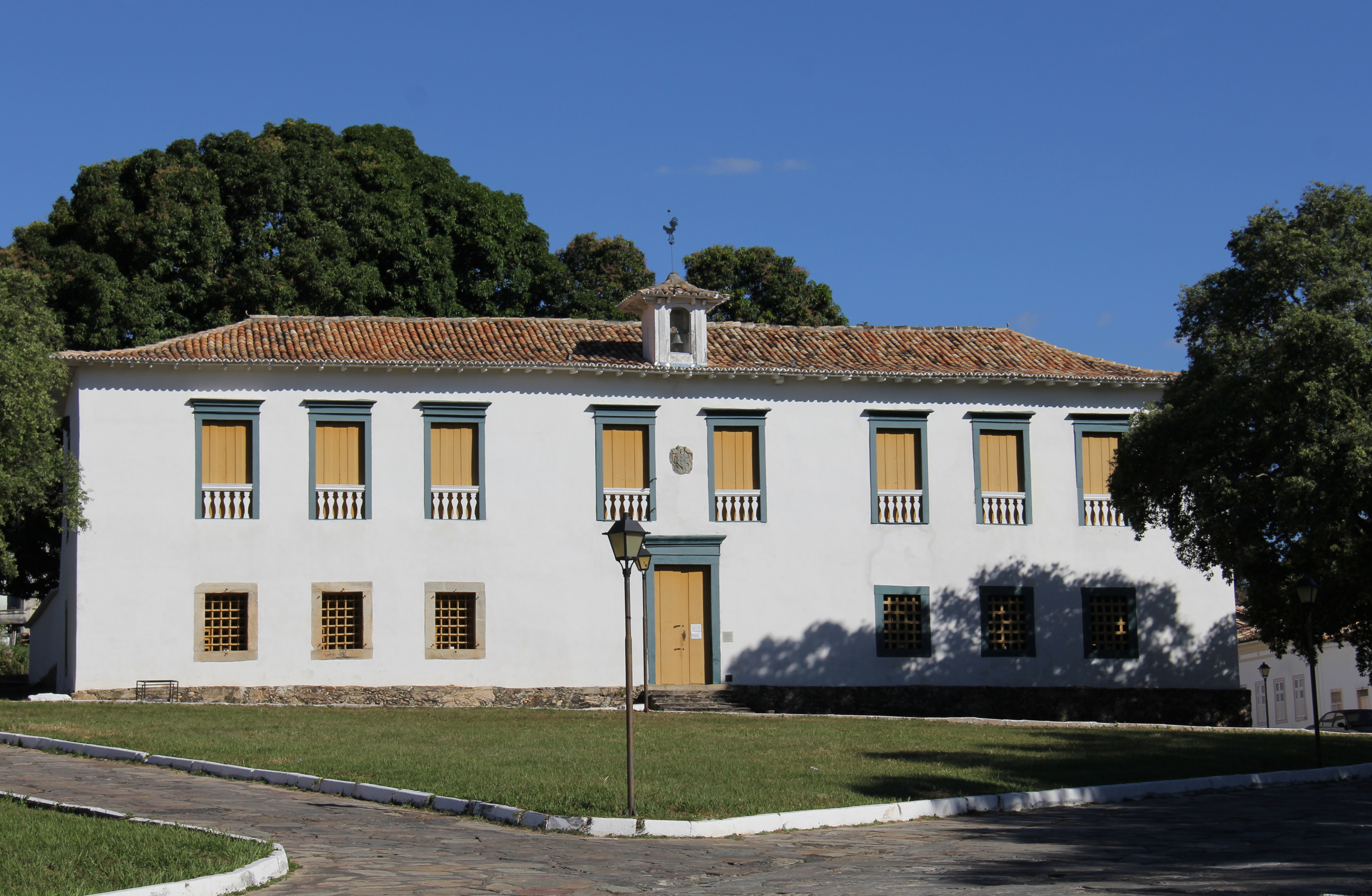
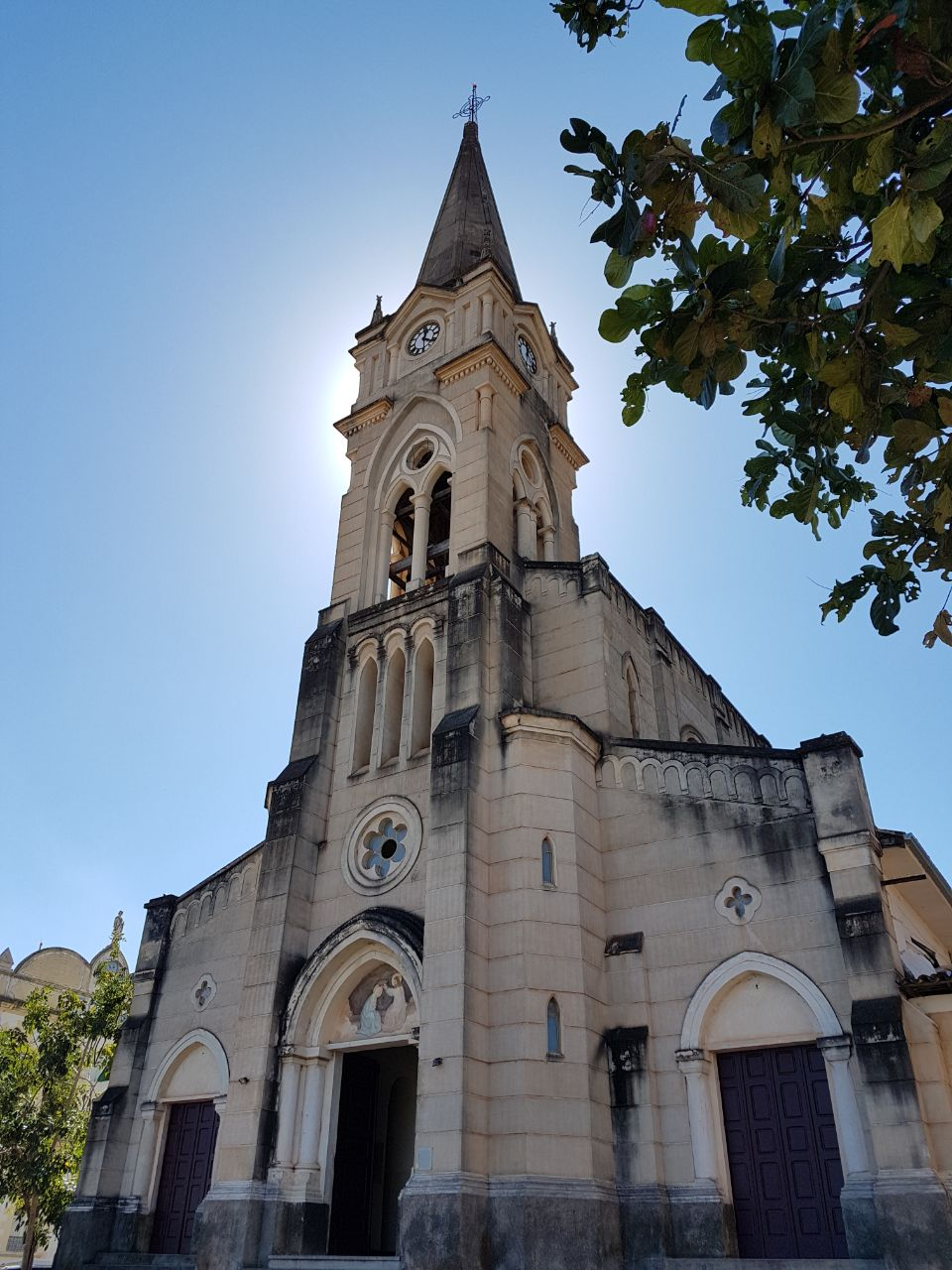
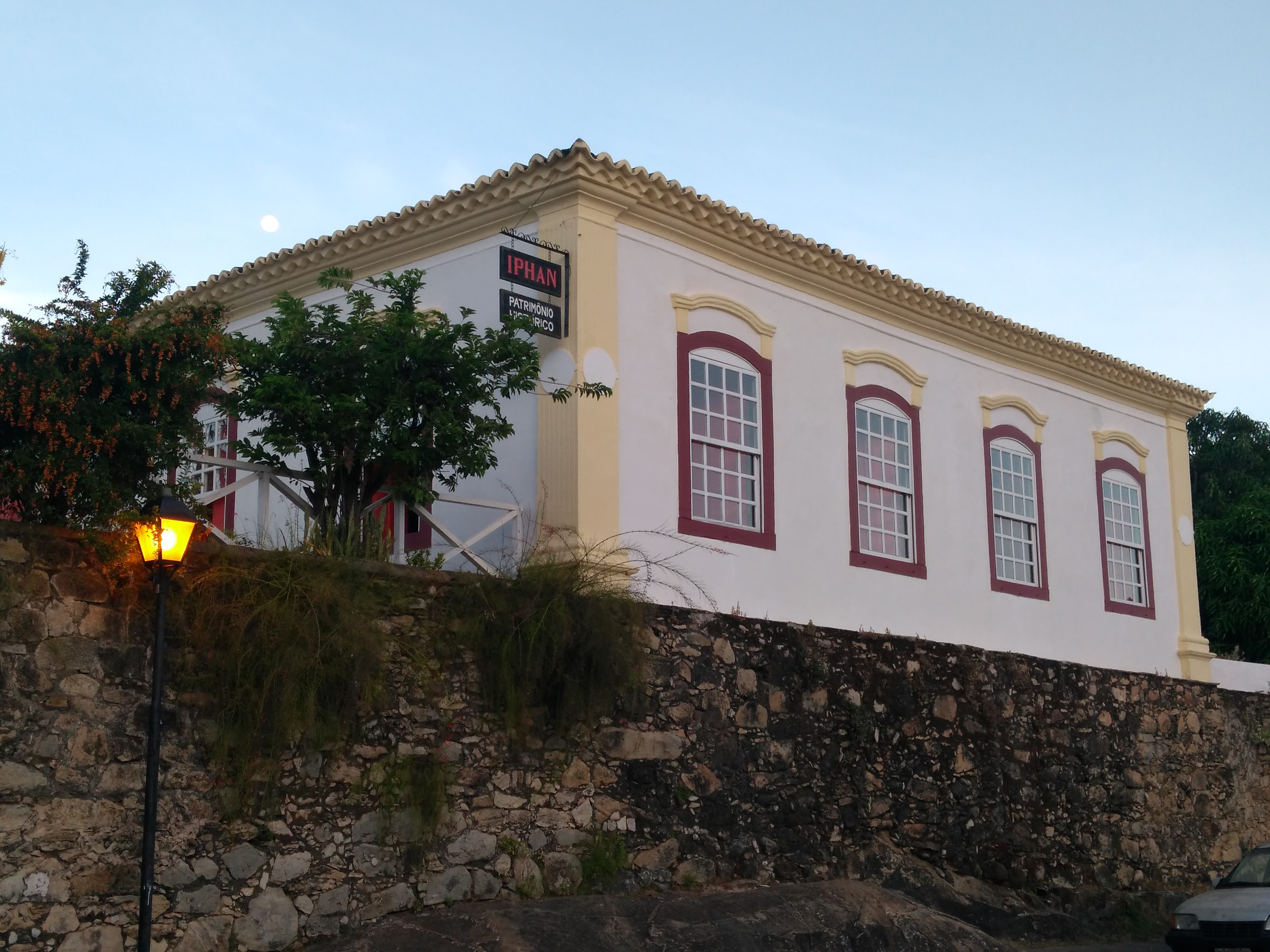
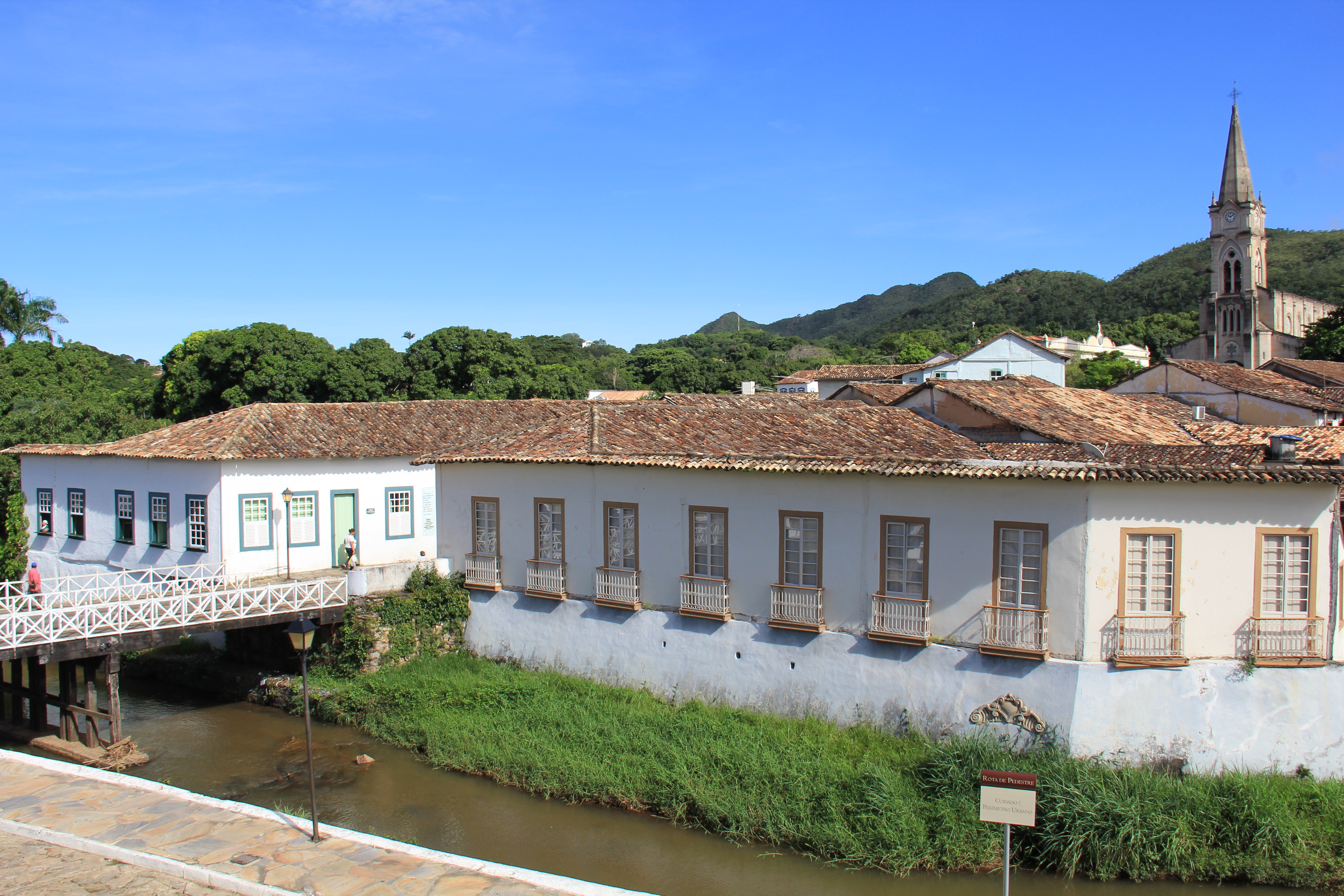
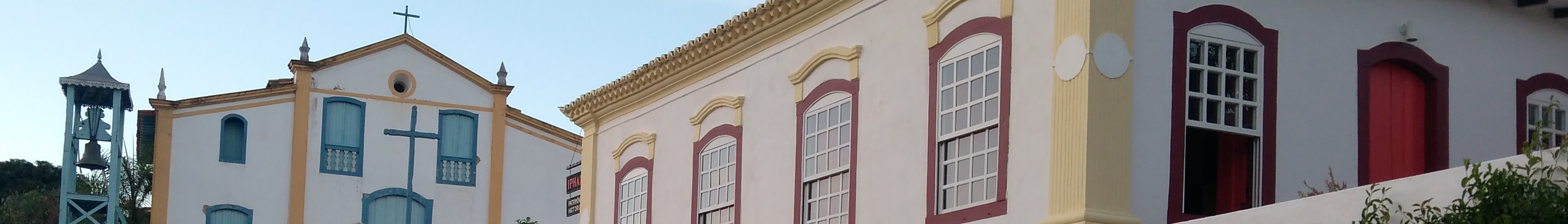

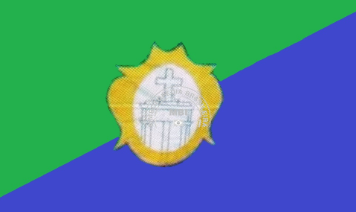
- Flag Coat of arms

- Location in Goiás state

- Location in Brazil
- Coordinates: 15°56′2″S 50°8′24″W
- Country: Brazil
- Region: Central-West
- State: Goiás

Area
  - Total: 3,108 km^{2} (1,200 sq mi)
- Elevation: 496 m (1,627 ft)

Population (2020)
  - Total: 22,381
  - Density: 7.201/km^{2} (18.65/sq mi)
- Time zone: UTC−3 (BRT)
- HDI (2010): 0.709 – high
- Website: prefeituradegoias.go.gov.br

Goiás (also known as Goiás Velho, Old Goiás) is a municipality in the state of Goiás in Brazil. Its population was 22,381 (2020 est.) and its area is 3,108 km^{2}. It is the former capital of the state and preserves much of its colonial heritage. In 2002, it became a UNESCO World Heritage Site.

== World Heritage Site ==
Historic Centre of the Town of Goiás
UNESCO World Heritage Site
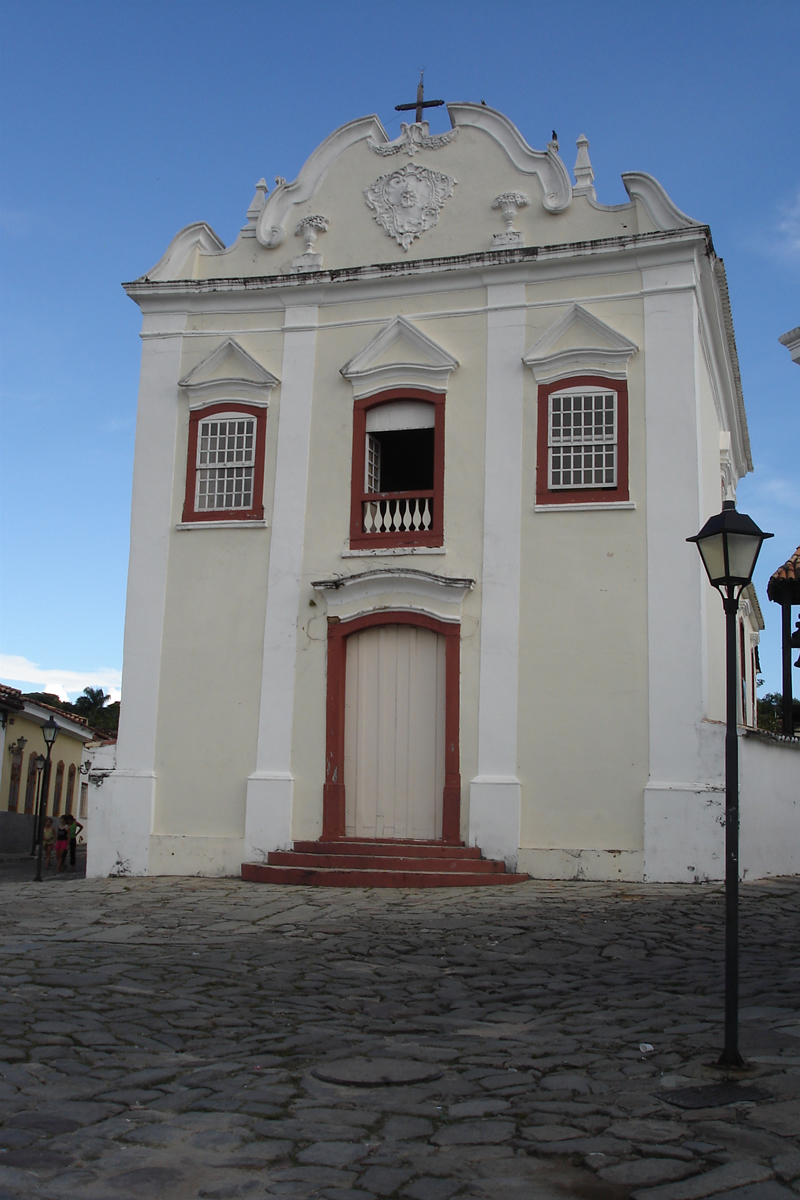
- Interactive map of Historic Centre of the Town of Goiás
- Criteria: Cultural: (ii)(iv)
- Reference: 993
- Inscription: 2001 (25th Session)
- Area: 40.3 ha (0.156 sq mi)
- Buffer zone: 43.5 ha (0.168 sq mi)

It used to be the old state capital of Goiás up until 1937 when the government seat was transferred to the then-recently built Goiânia. It was founded by the famed Bandeirante explorer Bartolomeu Bueno da Silva, nicknamed the Anhangüera, and was called in colonial times Vila Boa de Goyaz ("Good Village of Goyaz" in archaic Portuguese). Given its historical importance, the historical center of Goiás was included on the UNESCO's World Heritage list in 2001.

== Location ==
Municipal boundaries:

- North: Faina
- South: Mossâmedes
- East: Itaberaí
- West: Itapirapuã and Matrinchã
- Districts: Calcilândia, Buenolândia, Davidópolis, São João e Uvá. *Povoado (village): São João da Lajinha.
- Aglomerados (smaller than a village): Areias and Ferreiro

Distances

- Goiânia : 148 km
- Aruanã : 178 km
- Brasília : 307 km

Access can be made by highways GO-070 / Goianira / Inhumas / Itaberaí / BR-070.Sepin

== Geography ==
The topography of the municipality is characterized by rugged terrain and several rivers. The Serra Dourada Mountains are nearby. The municipality contains part of the 26,626 hectares (65,790 acres) Serra Dourada State Park, created in 2003. Waterfalls and rapids are easily accessible from the center and several of them have beaches open to the public. The most important are:

- Balneário Cachoeira Grande, 6 km from the city
- Balneário Santo Antônio, 6 km from the city
- Balneário Bacalhau, at the entrance to the city

Rivers that cross the municipality are:

- Rio Vermelho, Urú, do Peixe, Ferreira and Índio

== Political data ==
- Eligible voters: 17,813 (2016)
- Mayor: Aderson Liberato Gouvea (Workers' Party) (2021 - incumbent)
- Vice-mayor: Zilda Lôbo (Progressives) (2021 - incumbent)
- Councilmembers: 9

== Demographic data ==
- Population in 1980: 42,958
- Population in 2010: 24,727
- Population growth rate 1980/2010: approx. -42.44%
- Estimated population in 2018: 22,916

== Economy ==
The economy of the region is dependent on tourism, cattle raising, and agriculture. The cattle population consisted of 241,000. The main agricultural products were bananas, oranges, hearts of palm, rice (2,600 hectares), beans, corn (3,800 hectares), soybeans and wheat.

== Education and health ==
- Literacy rate: 85.4%
- Infant mortality rate: 28.53 in 1,000 live births
- Schools: 52 (2006) with 7,913 students
- Higher education: UEG - Campus Cora Coralina, UFG - Regional Goiás
- Hospitals: 1 (2019)

== History ==
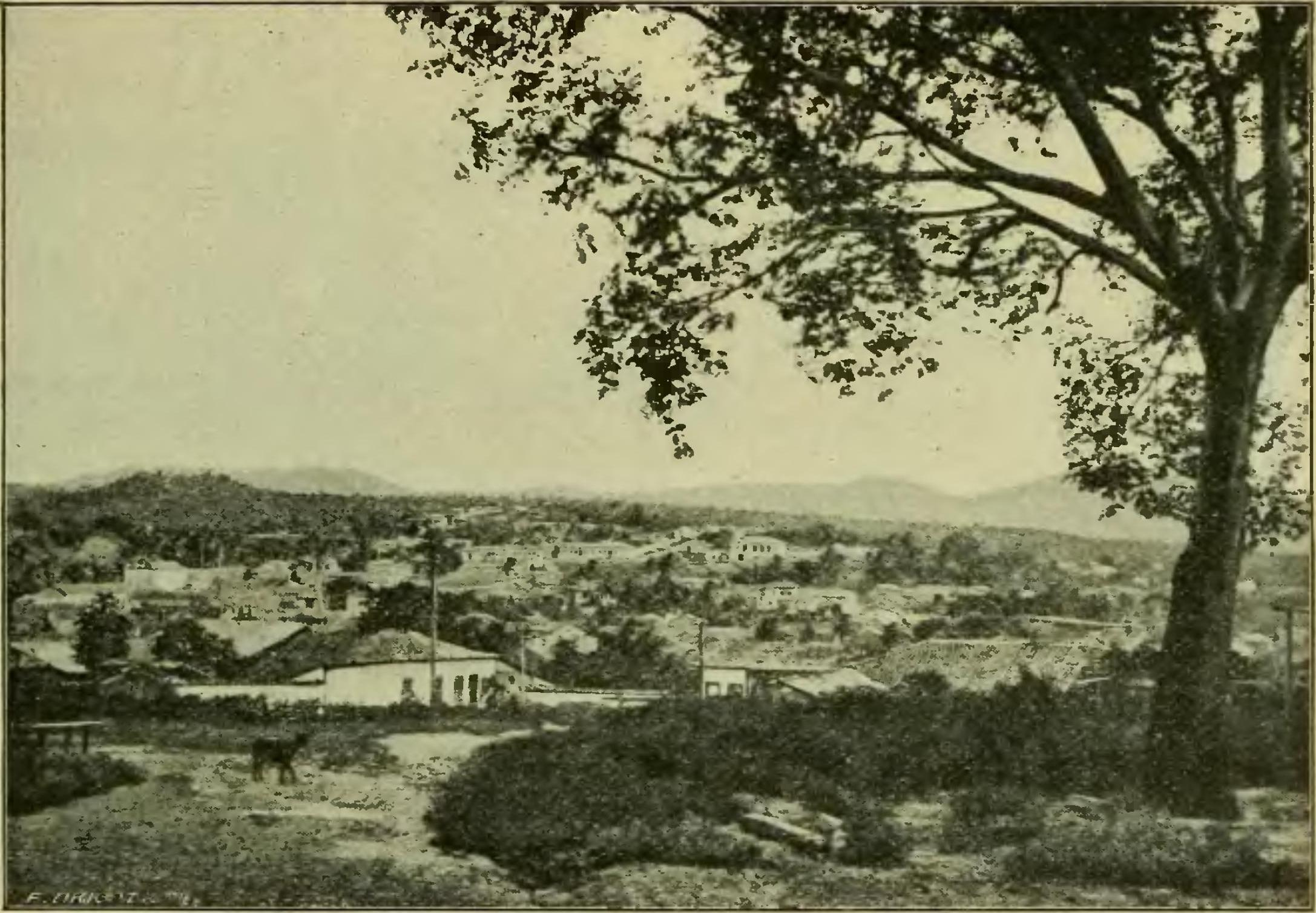
Goiás circa 1903

Goiás Velho was founded in 1727, its name being a tribute to the Goyaz Indians, the inhabitants of the area before the arrival of the Europeans. Its houses, chapels and churches are testimony to the height of the gold rush era. The history of the town, which is intertwined with the history of Goiás state, and certain reminders of the wealth of past centuries carved in gold, can be seen in places such as the Museu das Bandeiras, built in 1761; the Colégio Sant'Ana, founded in 1879 by Dominican friars; the church of Nossa Senhora d'Abadia, constructed in 1790, with its altar painted in blue and gold; and the Casa da Fundição, dating from 1752, where the gold from the mines was cast.

Surrounded by the Serra Dourada, Goiás Velho is the native city of the poet Ana Lins dos Guimarães Peixoto Bretas (1889-1985), better known as Cora Coralina. Although she started writing at 14 years of age, she published her first book when she was 75. In order to survive, she made and sold crystallised sweets. The house where she lived, one of the oldest in the city, dating from 1782, has become a museum, containing her furniture, personal possessions, documents and letters from illustrious correspondents such as the poet Carlos Drummond de Andrade (1902-1987) and the Bahian writer Jorge Amado, one of the main representatives of the literature of the North East region and one of the most widely read Brazilian authors both inside and outside the country.

== Festivals ==
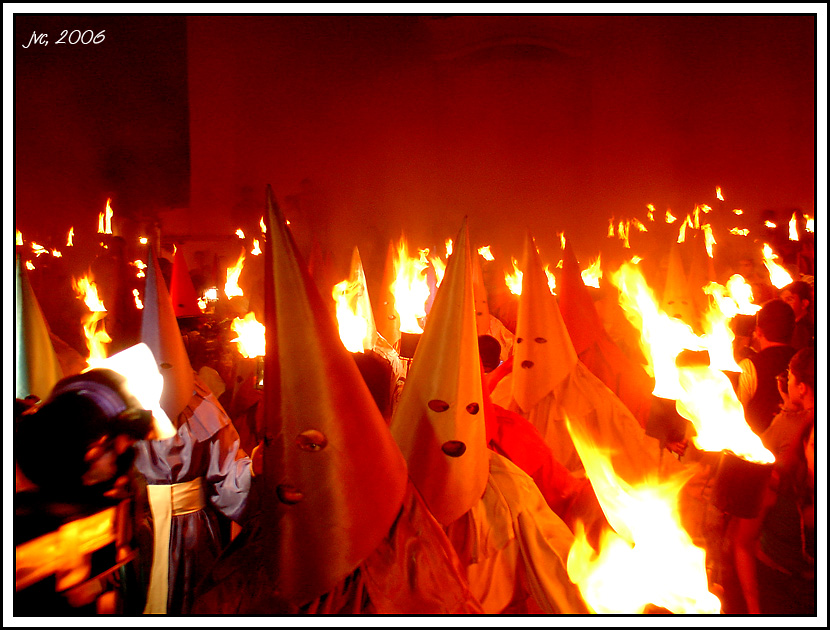
Procession of the Fogaréu in Goiás Velho

In Goiás, one of the most popular festivals is the Procession of the Fogaréu, which occurs on the Wednesday before Easter Sunday. It is one of the most traditional events of Holy Week in Brazil and only in Angra dos Reis is a similar procession celebrated. During the ceremony the farricocos (the people dressed in medieval robes and hoods that accompany processions of penitence) simulate Jesus' arrest by the Roman soldiers by running through the streets of the town at midnight with torches to the sound of drums. There is a great resemblance with some traditions that take place in Spain at the same time of year especially in Toledo and Sevilla. The darkness, the torches, and the speed of the men with covered faces create a medieval atmosphere. It was believed that the devil was loose in the streets of the town on that night, frightening all, especially the children. Originally, only men could participate but today that has changed. Superstitions like the presence of a werewolf and a headless mule are also manifested in this popular festival. Tourists come from far and wide to witness the spectacle. In 2006, according to the Diario da Manhã a newspaper from Goiânia, 10,000 tourists came to watch the procession.

Another notable festival that happens yearly in the town is the FICA (Festival Internacional de Cinema e Video Ambiental, or International Environmental Film and Video Festival). The goal of FICA is to promote, screen and award prizes to short, medium and feature-length films, in the animation, fiction or documentary genres, that address environmental themes, as well as to promote actions in production and education in the film and environmental fields. Every year the festival attracts tourists from all over the world.

== Municipal Human Development Index ==
- MHDI: 0.736
- State ranking: 125 (out of 242 municipalities in 2000)
- National ranking: 2,283 (out of 5,507 municipalities in 2000)
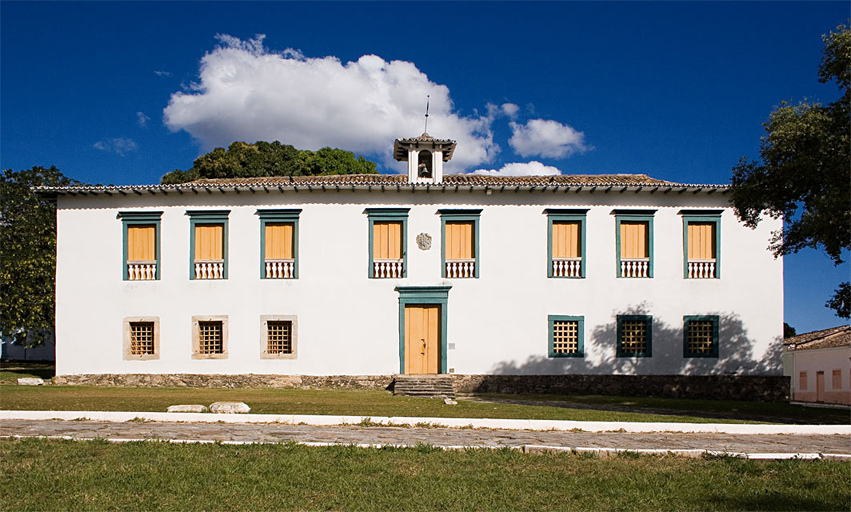
Antiga Casa da Câmara e Cadeia, atual MuBan

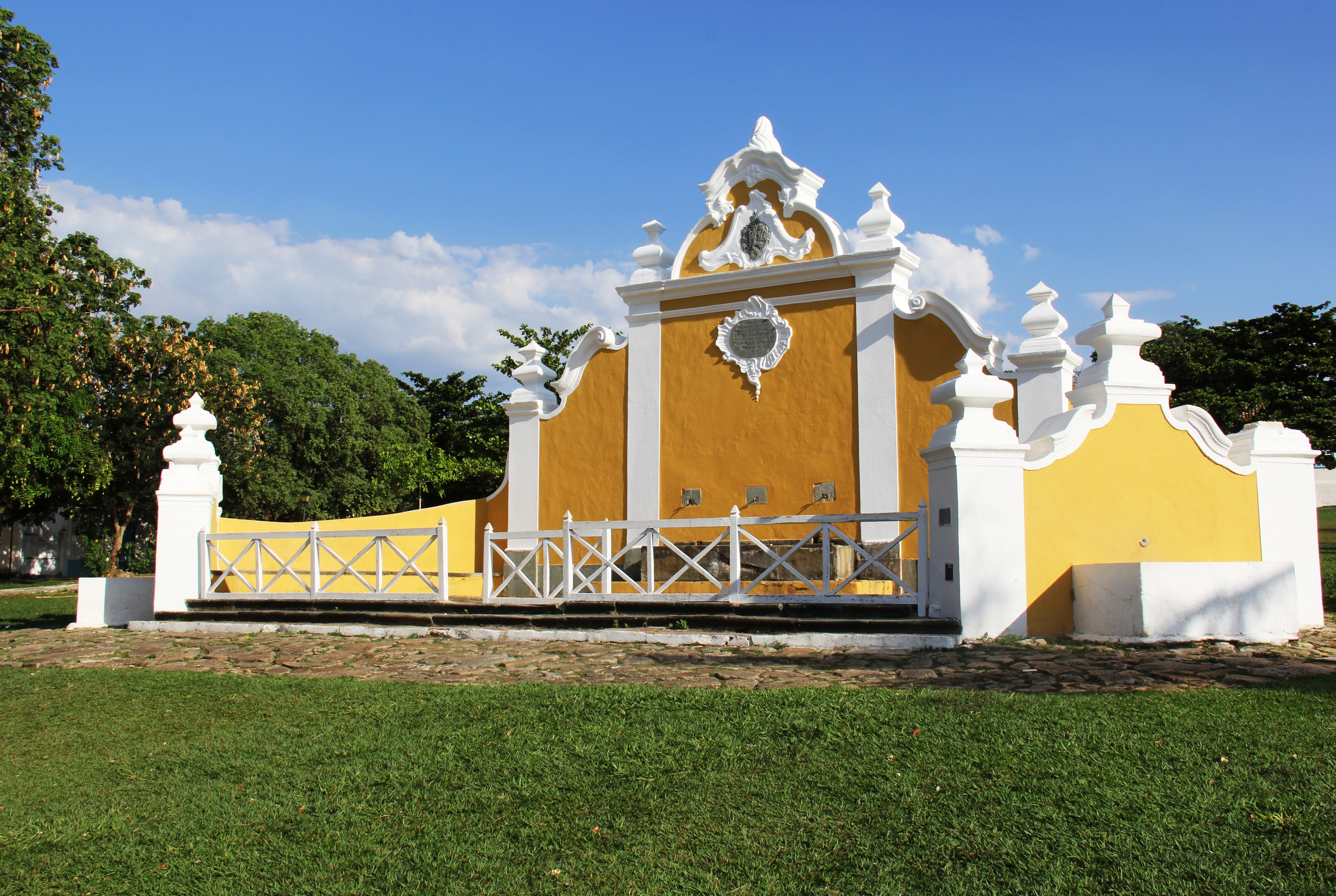
Chafariz de Cauda

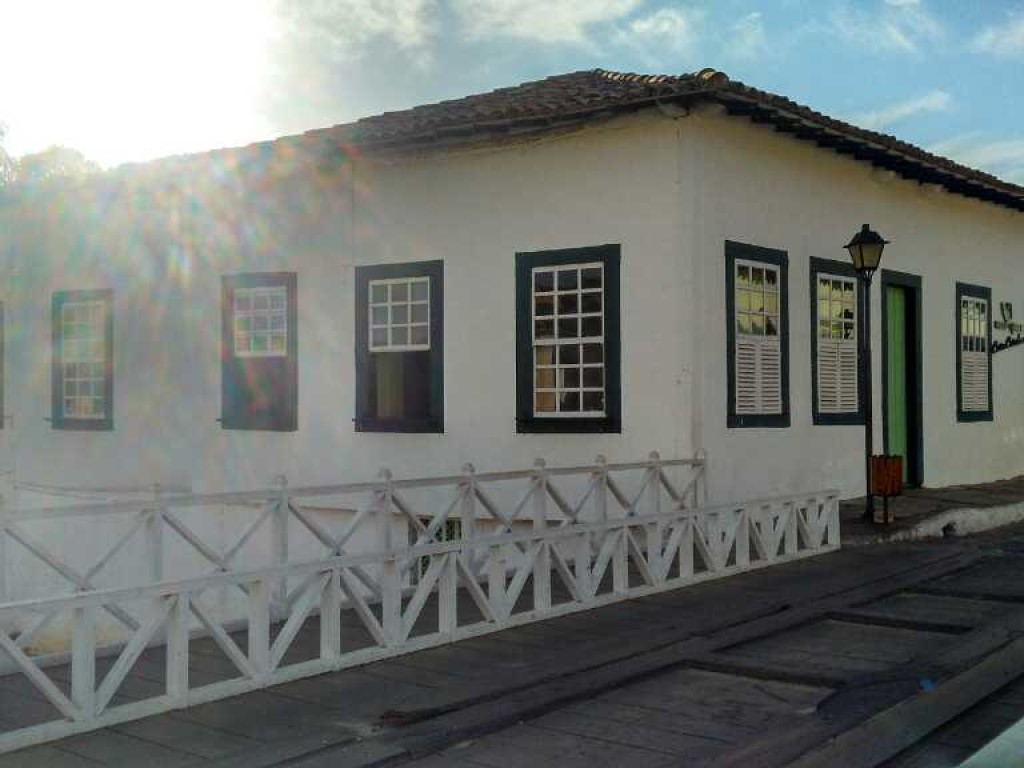
Casa de Cora Coralina

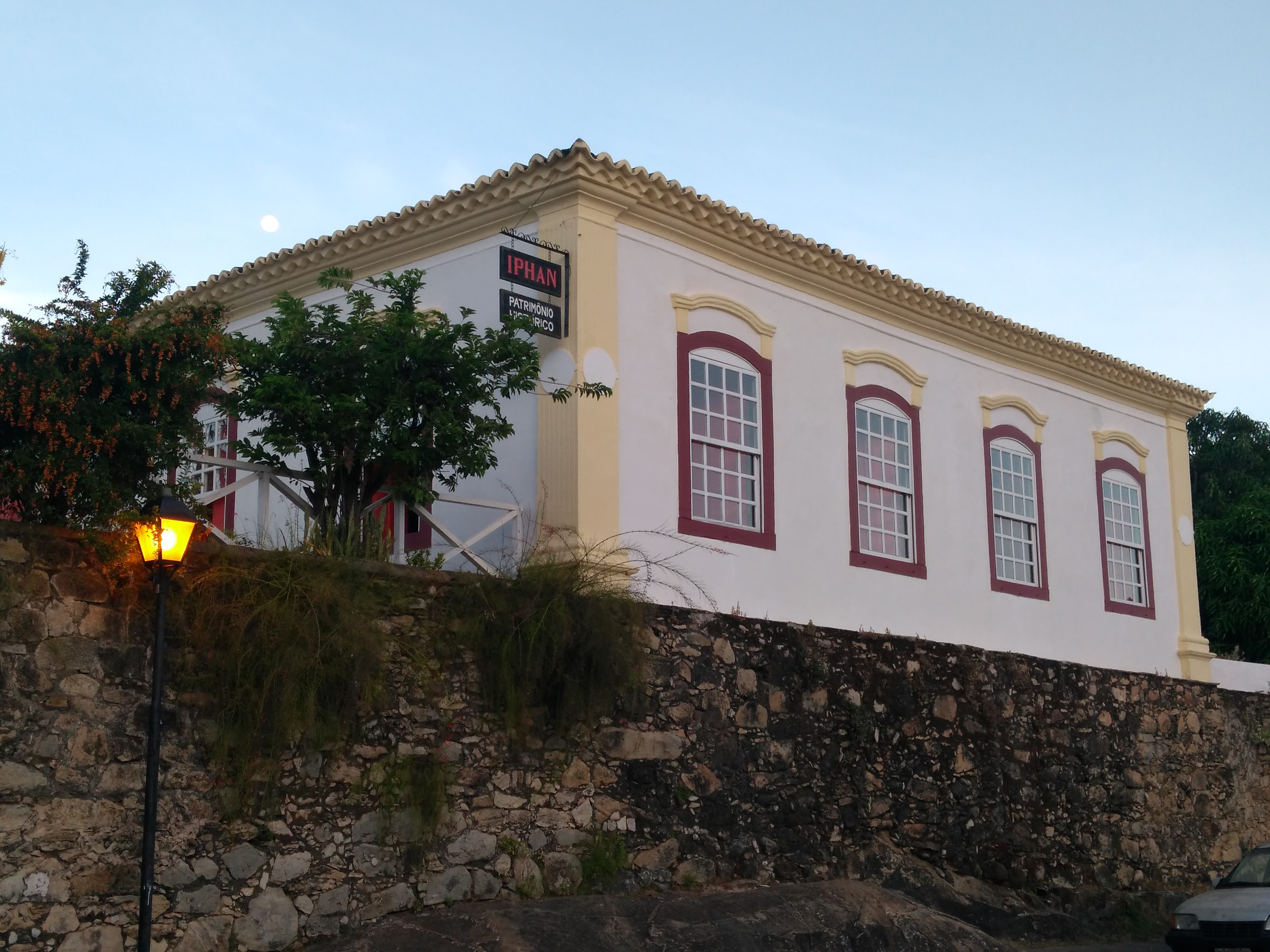
Casa do Bispo

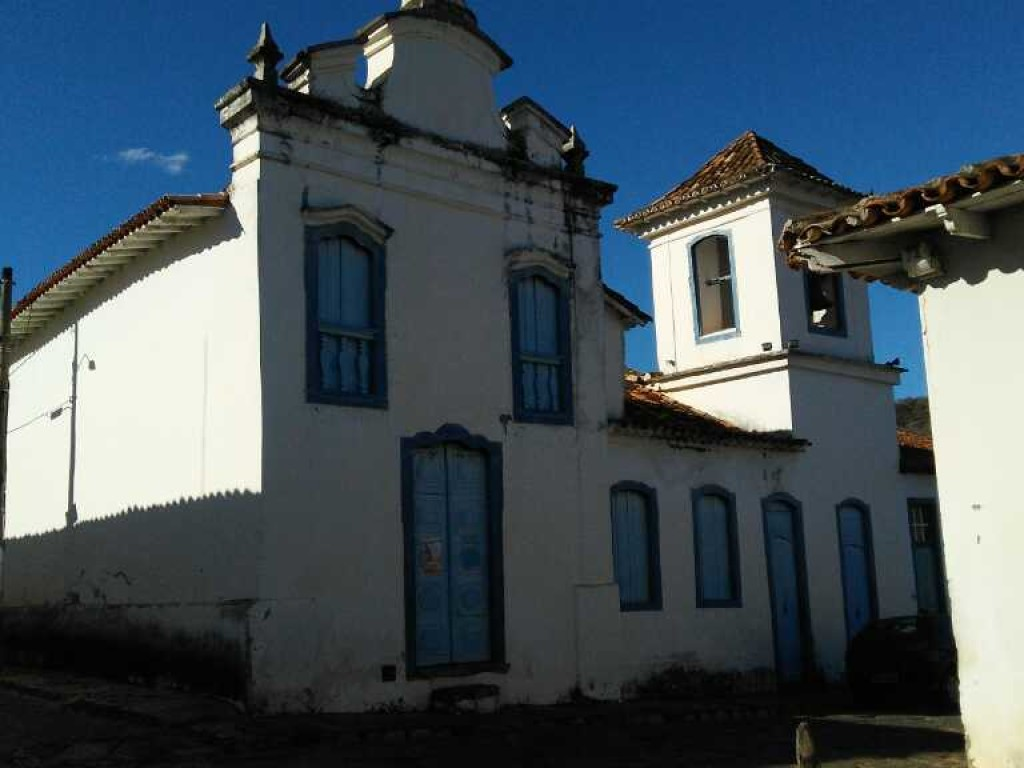
Igreja de Nossa Senhora d'Abadia

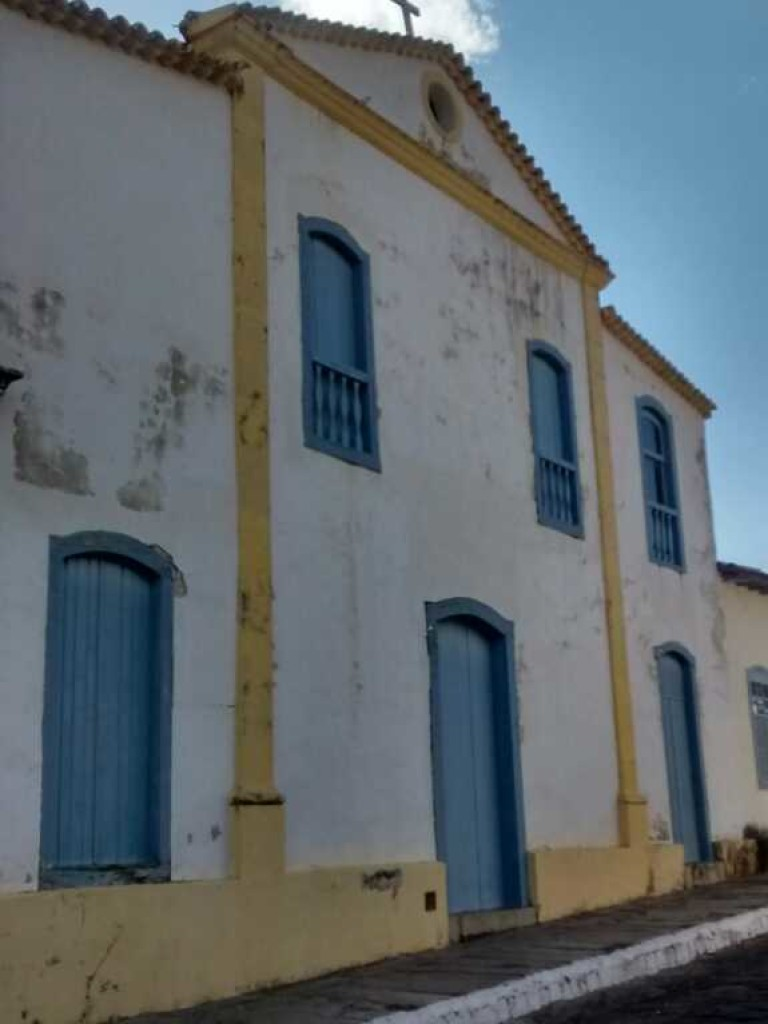
Igreja de Nossa Senhora do Carmo

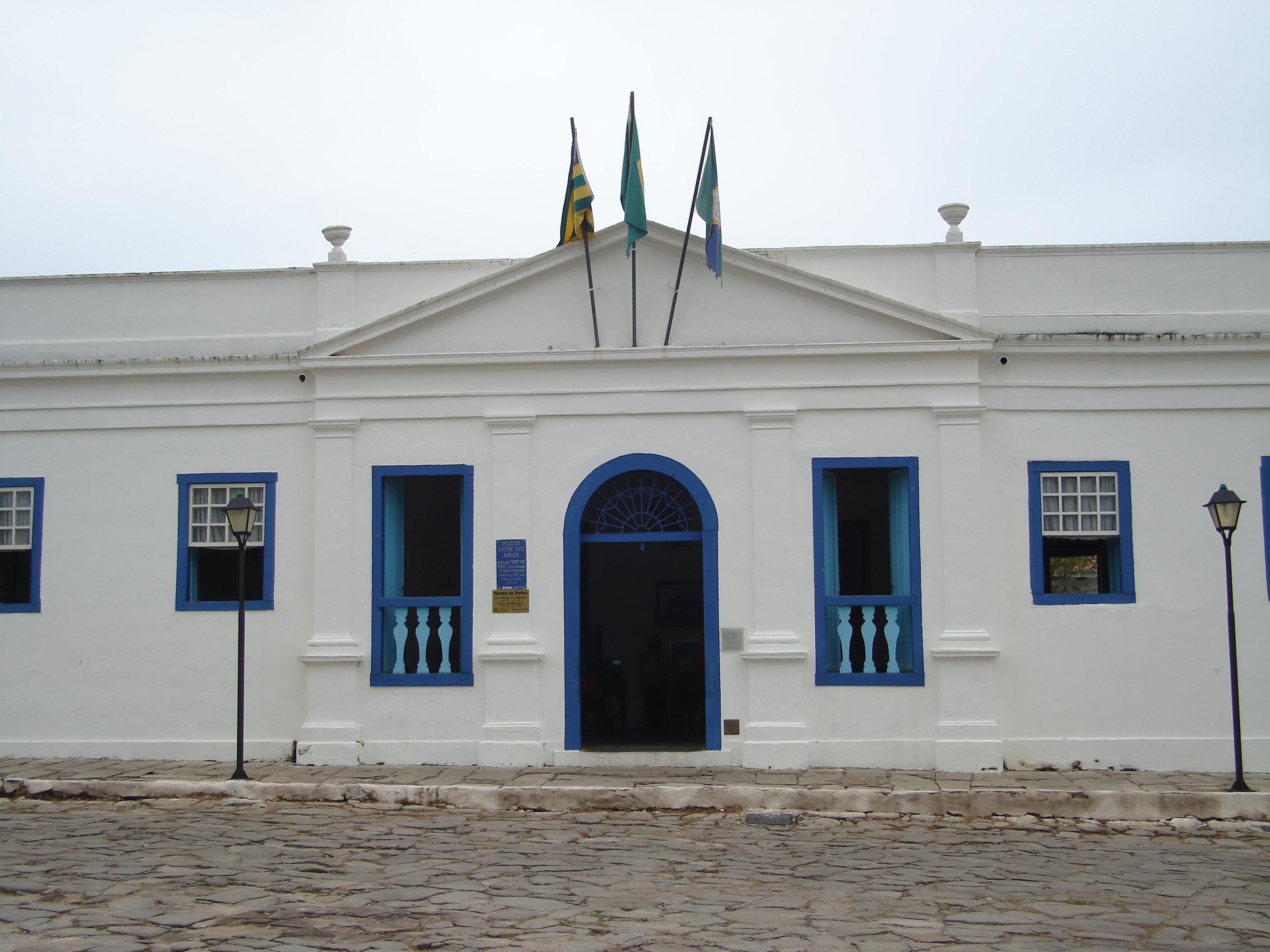
Palácio do Conde dos Arcos

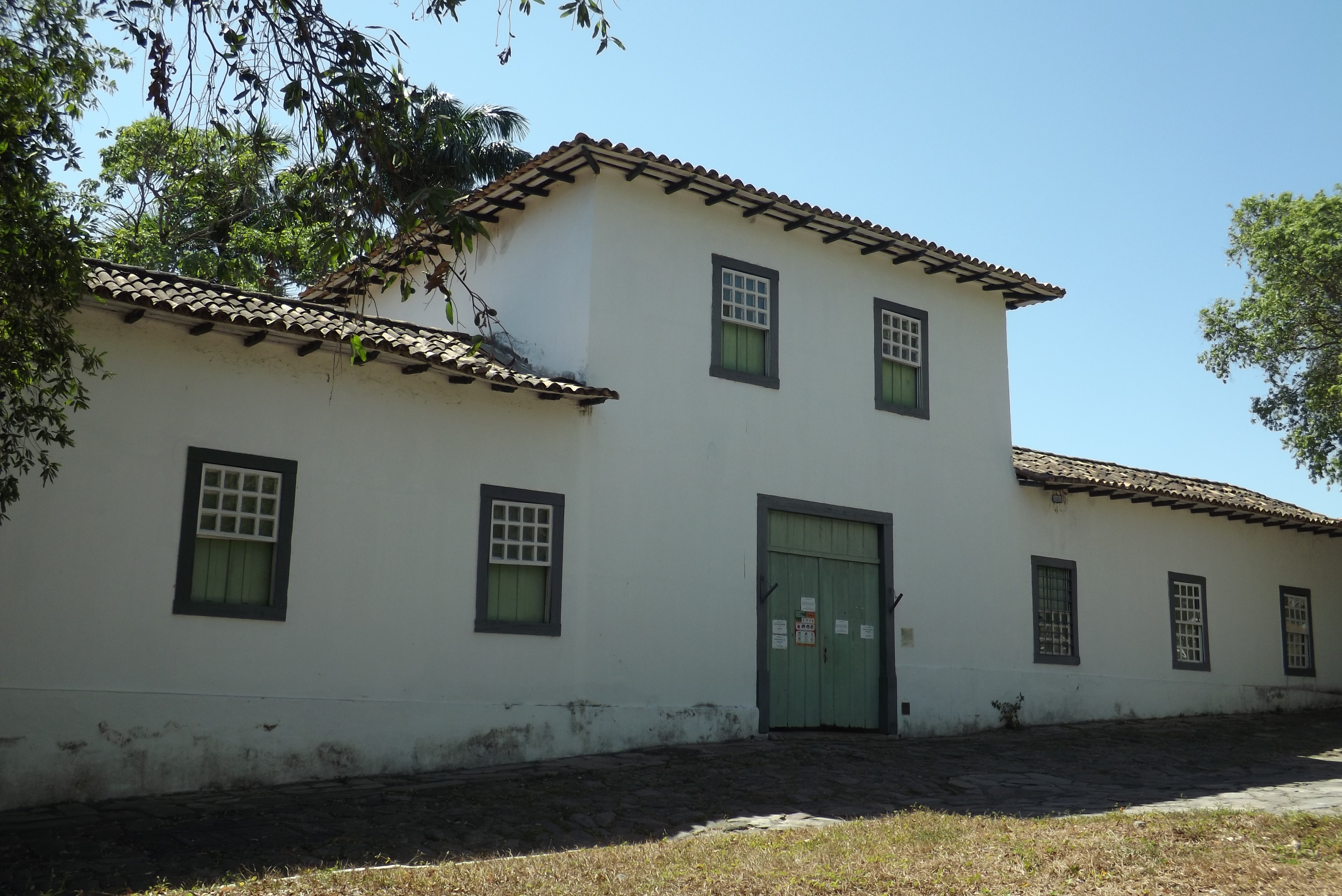
Quartel do XX

== See also ==
- List of municipalities in Goiás

== Climate ==
Climate data for Goiás, Goiás (1991–2020)
Month	Jan	Feb	Mar	Apr	May	Jun	Jul	Aug	Sep	Oct	Nov	Dec	Year
Mean daily maximum °C (°F)	31.3 (88.3)	32.0 (89.6)	32.1 (89.8)	32.8 (91.0)	32.4 (90.3)	32.1 (89.8)	32.5 (90.5)	34.6 (94.3)	35.8 (96.4)	34.5 (94.1)	32.1 (89.8)	31.1 (88.0)	32.8 (91.0)
Mean daily minimum °C (°F)	21.3 (70.3)	21.3 (70.3)	21.3 (70.3)	21.0 (69.8)	19.3 (66.7)	18.0 (64.4)	17.9 (64.2)	19.9 (67.8)	22.1 (71.8)	22.1 (71.8)	21.6 (70.9)	21.4 (70.5)	20.6 (69.1)
Average precipitation mm (inches)	329.7 (12.98)	262.4 (10.33)	239.2 (9.42)	100.8 (3.97)	21.3 (0.84)	11.6 (0.46)	2.8 (0.11)	8.1 (0.32)	40.4 (1.59)	127.5 (5.02)	242.1 (9.53)	322.7 (12.70)	1,708.6 (67.27)
Average precipitation days (≥ 1.0 mm)	20	17	16	8	2	1	0	1	4	10	16	19	114
Average relative humidity (%)	79.9	78.4	78.6	73.1	65.9	59.2	52.2	44.8	49.3	63.7	74.3	79.6	66.6
Mean monthly sunshine hours	149.4	169.7	173.6	216.2	248.2	250.4	262.6	262.8	199.6	198.8	163.6	144.4	2,439.3
Source: Instituto Nacional de Meteorologia (humidity and sun 1981–2010)
