= Goianira =

- Municipality
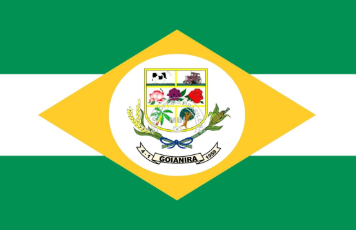
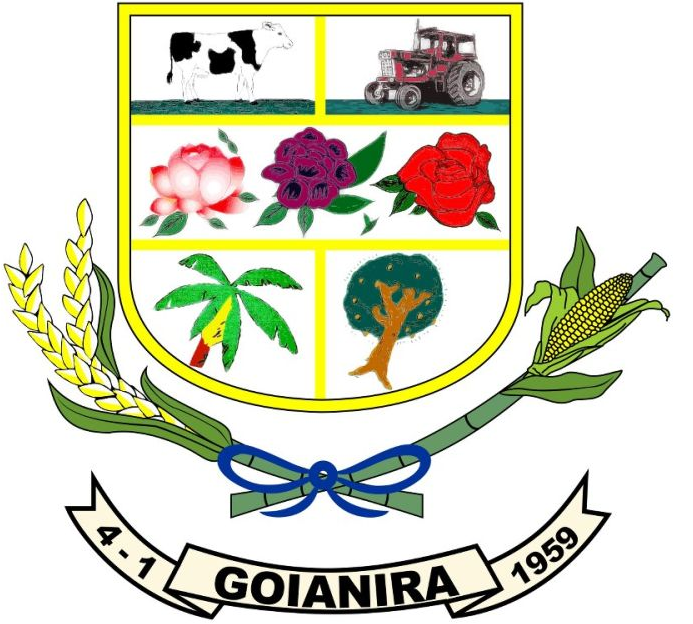
- Flag Coat of arms

- Location in Goiás state

- Location in Brazil
- Coordinates: 16°30′24″S 49°25′26″W
- Country: Brazil
- Region: Central-West
- State: Goiás
- Microregion: Goiânia Microregion

Area
  - Total: 200.4 km^{2} (77.4 sq mi)
- Elevation: 757 m (2,484 ft)

Population (2020)
  - Total: 45,296
  - Density: 226.0/km^{2} (585.4/sq mi)
- Time zone: UTC−3 (BRT)
- Postal code: 75370-000

Goianira is a municipality in central Goiás state, Brazil, located 32 kilometers northwest of the state capital, Goiânia. The population was 45,296 (2020) with a total area of 200.4 km^{2} (10/10/2002). Goianira is becoming a major producer of shoes.

Goianira is four kilometers east of highway BR-457 / GO-415, which links Goiânia to Aruanã. It is in the Meia Ponte River valley.

Neighboring municipalities are:

- north: Caturaí
- south: Goiânia and Trindade
- east: Santo Antônio de Goiás
- west: Avelinópolis

== History ==
Goianira was founded in 1920 by Padre Pelágio Sáuter, with the name São Geraldo. In 1935, São Geraldo became a district. In 1940, it served as a base for the construction of the new capital of the state of Goiás, and the name was changed to Itaim. This name lasted until 1942 when it was changed to Itaité. After a popular movement, the name was changed back to São Geraldo. This name lasted until 1943, when it was given its current name, Goianira. This name was supposedly chosen because of the name of the daughter of a popular school teacher of the town. Source: Sepin

== Political data ==
- Eligible voters: 16,182 (12/2007)
- Mayor: Carlos Alberto Andrade Oliveira (January 2005)
- Vice-mayor: Dirley Correa de Oliveira
- Councilmembers: 9

== Economic data ==
- Industrial units: 56 (06/2007)
- Retail units: 160 (08/2007)
- Banking institutions: Banco Itaú S.A. (08/2007)
- Dairies: none (07/06/2005)
- Meat packing houses: Frigorífico Centro-Oeste SP Ltda.; - Boa Vista Alimentos Ltda. (22/05/2006)
- Industrial Park: Distrito Agroindustrial - DAG (Pólo Calçadista)

Main agricultural activities (2006):

- Cattle raising: 24,000 head (2006)
- Poultry: 90,600
- Agriculture: rice (650 hectares), sugarcane (365 hectares), beans (165 hectares), and corn (900 hectares). There is modest production of coffee, coconuts, citrus fruits, and tomatoes.

== Education (2006) and health (2007) ==
- Literacy rate: 88.1%
- Infant mortality rate: 23.50 in 1,000 live births
- Schools: 14 (2006)
- Classrooms: 124
- Teachers: 277
- Students: 7,179
- Hospitals: 1 (July 2007)
- Hospital beds: 34
- Walk-in public health clinics: 12

Human Development Index: 0.739

- State ranking: 106 out of 242 municipalities in 2000
- National ranking: 2,161 out of 5,507 municipalities in 2000

== See also ==
- List of municipalities in Goiás
