= Parish Church of Trindade =

Catholic Church in Brazil

- Igreja Matriz de Trindade
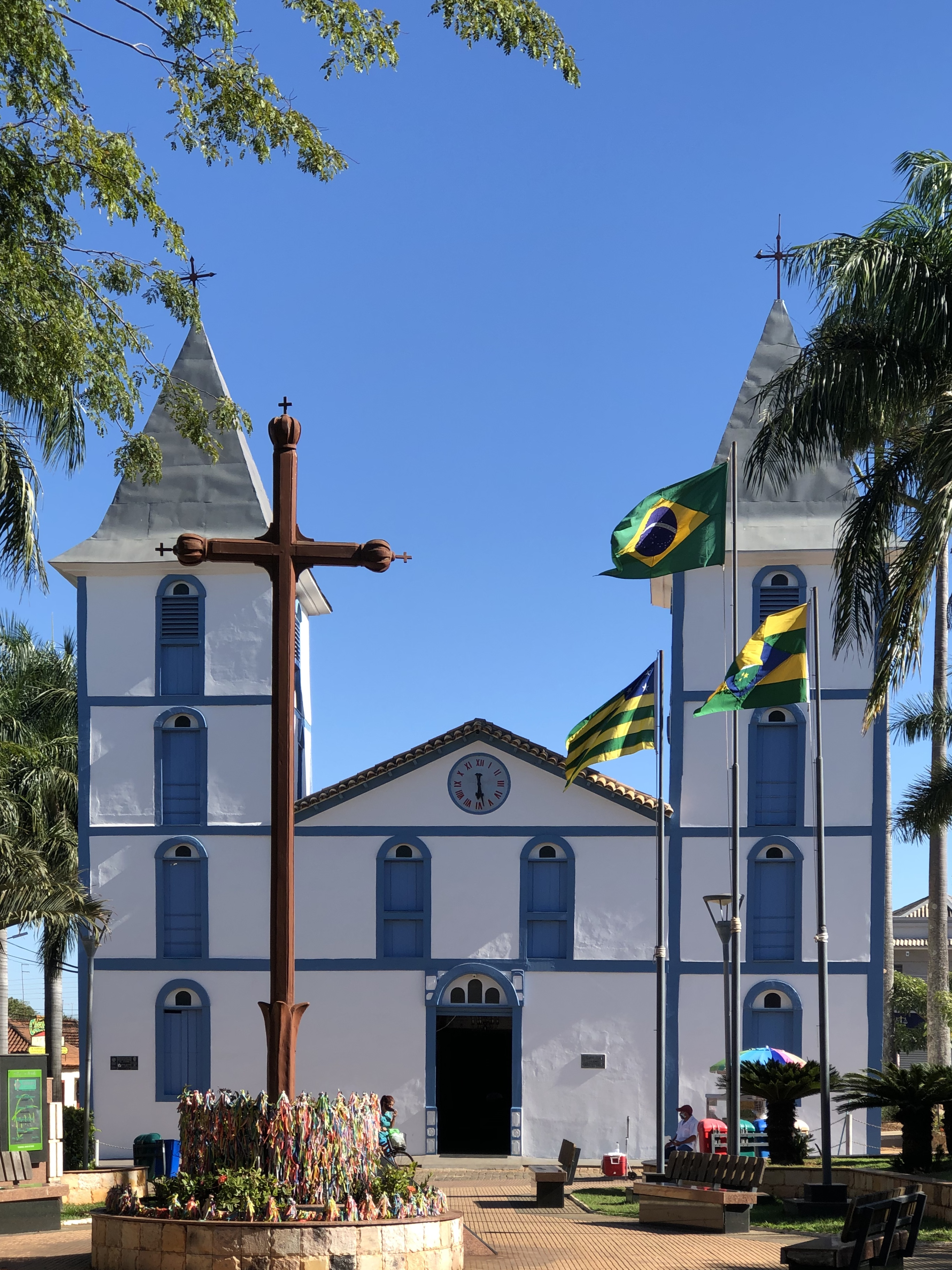
- Facade of the church.

- Location of the Church

Religion
- Affiliation: Catholic
- Ownership: Roman Catholic Archdiocese of Goiânia

Location
- Municipality: Trindade
- State: Goiás
- Country: Brazil
- Interactive map of Parish Church of Trindade
- Coordinates: 16°39′20″S 49°29′30″W

Architecture
- Architect: Antão Jorge Hechensblarkner
- Style: Baroque
- Established: 1912

National Historic Heritage of Brazil
- Designated: 2014
- Reference no.: 1656

The Parish Church of Trindade (Portuguese: Igreja Matriz de Trindade), also known as the Parish Church of the Divine Eternal Father (Portuguese: Igreja Matriz do Divino Pai Eterno), is a Catholic church located in the Brazilian city of Trindade, in Goiás. It was inaugurated on September 8, 1912, by the Redemptorist missionary Antão Jorge and has been considered a Cultural Heritage of Brazil by the National Institute of Historic and Artistic Heritage since September 24, 2014.

The temple is related to population growth and the formal establishment of the city, which occurred eight years later, in 1920, due to the attraction of numerous believers who wished to worship the Eternal Father. The Parish Church of Trindade is one of the tourist attractions of the city, especially during the Feast of the Eternal Father, a revered religious event that takes place annually in late June and early July.

Its current configuration dates from the last restoration, executed and supervised by the Roman Catholic Archdiocese of Goiânia in 2013, which highlighted the baroque style and the blue tone of the facade. The nave, the high altar and the side aisles show the simplicity and rusticity of the objects used in the construction of the church.

== History ==
=== The beginning ===
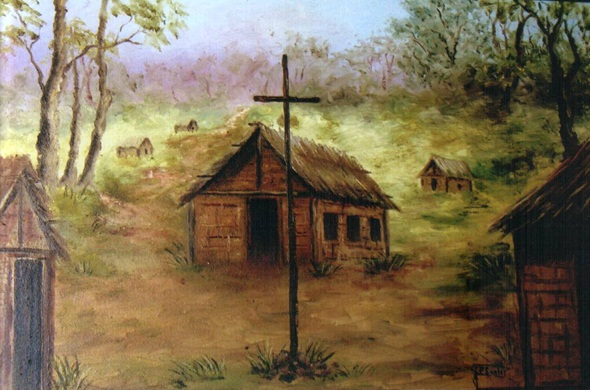
Chapel built in 1848 by Ana Rosa and Constantino Xavier, in the area where the Parish Church of Trindade currently stands.

The inauguration of the Parish Church of Trindade is directly related to the formal establishment of the city. Built in the territory of the former municipality of Campinas, the church was planned by the Austro-Brazilian Father Antão Jorge in 1912, who was also responsible for organizing the materials that would constitute the church. In the region, around 1848, the gold prospectors Ana Rosa and Constantino Xavier built a chapel covered with buriti leaves, in order to expose the medallion with an illustration of the Holy Trinity crowning the Virgin Mary, that they found on the banks of the Barro Preto stream. From then on, countless people immigrated to the village of Barro Preto to venerate the image in devotion to the Divine Eternal Father.

The gold prospectors asked the sculptor José Joaquim da Veiga Vale to produce a larger replica of the image found, contributing to the population growth of the place. With the arrival of the Redemptorist priests, a religious pilgrimage to the chapel began, but the space became too small to accommodate all the tourists, so the church authorities of the Archdiocese of Goiânia organized, along with Father Antão Jorge, the inauguration of the Parish Church of Trindade in 1912, in the baroque style, with the first mass being held on September 8. The church became the main tourist center of the city until the construction of the Basilica of the Eternal Father in 1943.

=== Iconography ===
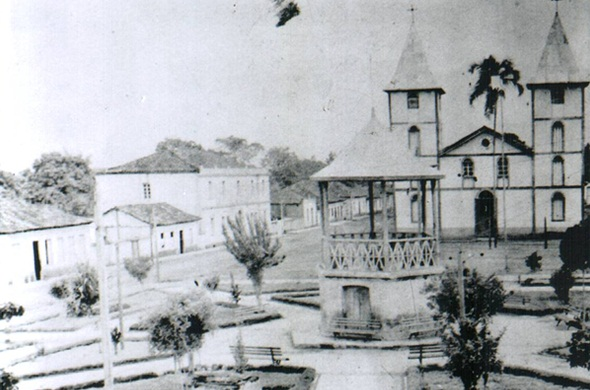
Photograph of the church in 1920.

In a photograph from 1920, it is possible to see the church as the main point of the city, at the time the picture was taken. Due to its construction, the church is centralized in the urban area and its style was maintained in the following decades, characterized by the main entrance and the two prominent towers.

Besides the symbols explicit in the photograph, the materials carved in the masonry by the Redemptorist priests involved in the construction of the temple were seen and kept. There are also the bells and clocks that were imported from Bavaria, Germany. The rustic brick, the dome of the tower and the altar represent the little technique used in the construction and the simplicity of the church.

=== Restorations ===
Since its inauguration to its current configuration, the Parish Church of Trindade has undergone numerous reforms; most of them without significant changes in its structure. The clearest modification was the removal of the walls surrounding the chancel and the pulpit inside. In 1958, the first restoration began, managed and supervised by Father Renato de Ferreira. In this renovation, the windows were replaced by stained glass windows, the parquet flooring was replaced by granite, and the facade was also altered. The place lost some of its original features and was reopened in December 1960.

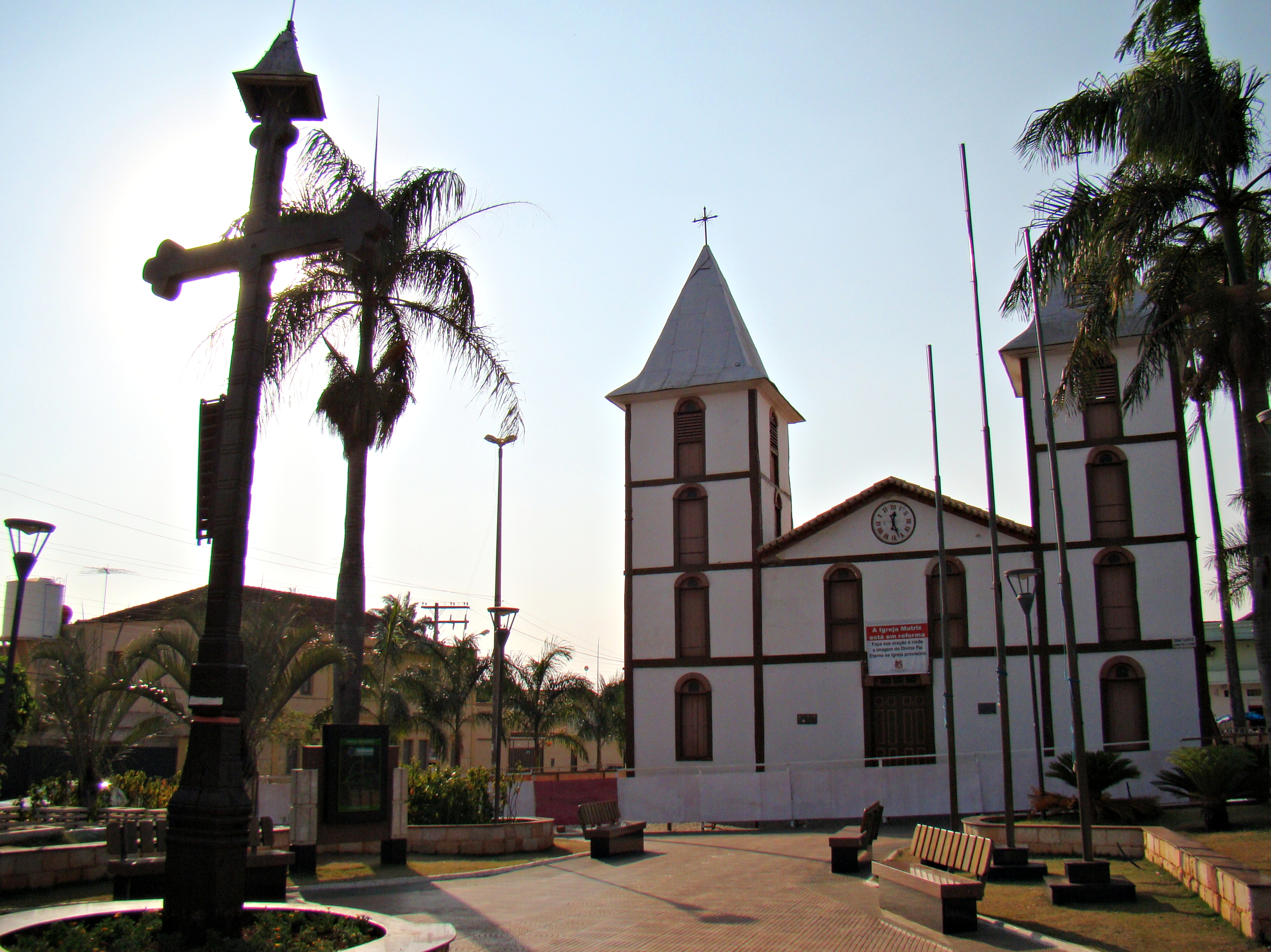
Parish Church of Trindade, before the last restoration, in September 2010.

As a result of being listed as Historical Heritage of Goiás on October 13, 1980, it was constitutionally guaranteed that the church could be compensated by the State due to any need for structural changes. Therefore, in 1984, a restoration was carried out in order to highlight the original features of 1912, but also to avoid the collapse, notified as a threat to occur at any time.

In 2001, fourteen paintings were removed, on the grounds that they were not part of the original structure of the church, according to documentation from the National Institute of Historic and Artistic Heritage. The church underwent renovations again in 2010, when the roof was renewed, since it was deteriorated by the action of natural phenomena and the presence of leaks that generated infiltration in the walls. In this work, zinc sheets of the two towers, gutters, and ruffles were replaced, and the church reopened on April 15, 2011.

The latest restoration was carried out at the end of 2013, with the clearest modification being the color: the external details went from brown to blue, as a commemoration of the church's centennial. However, the original architecture and style was maintained, with some materials considered worn out being replaced.

Our intention has always been to preserve this heritage for everyone to know our history. Who has history has life, has present, has future. So we need to preserve our history and make every moment count, every pilgrim who passed by here, every priest who celebrated his faith in this house and gave his contribution to this church, to this devotion.

— Father Marco Aurélio

== Protected status ==
The Parish Church of Trindade was listed as a National Material Cultural Heritage Site by the National Institute of Historic and Artistic Heritage on September 24, 2014. Previously, the church had already been recognized in the same category by the state of Goiás, alongside other churches in Goiás, Jaraguá, and Pirenópolis. The process responsible for the protection at the national level was filed by the government institution under No. 1656, which was unanimously accepted by the National Institute of Historic and Artistic Heritage's jurors, under the allegation of "its high historical value".

Approves the protection of the Parish Church of the Divine Eternal Father and its collection of movable and integrated assets, in the Municipality of Trindade, in the State of Goiás.

The Ministry of Culture, in the use of the legal attributions conferred upon her by item II of the sole paragraph of art. 87 of the Constitution, by Law No. 6.292, of December 15, 1975, and in view of the manifestation of the Cultural Heritage Advisory Council at its 73rd meeting, held on June 5, 2013, resolves:

Art. 1 Approve, for the purposes of Decree-Law No. 25, of November 30, 1937, the protection of the Parish Church of the Divine Eternal Father and its collection of movable and integrated assets, in the Municipality of Trindade, in the State of Goiás, referred to in Process No. 1.656 - T - 12 (Process No. 01450.007172/2012-11).

Art. 2 This Ordinance goes into effect on the date of its publication.

— Marta Suplicy, 2014, National Press

== Implantation and exterior ==
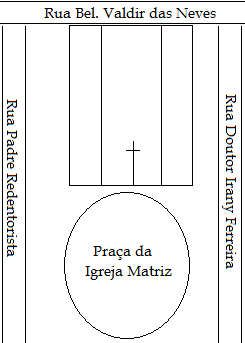
Representation of the location of the Parish Church of Trindade.

The Parish Church of Trindade is located in the Sanctuary Square, in the same area where the gold prospectors Ana Rosa and Constantino Xavier displayed the medallion they found at the disposal of tourists who wished to express their faith. The temple is located between Padre Redentorista Street and Doutor Irany Ferreira Street, in the Vila Santa Inês neighborhood; behind it, it intersects Bacharel Valdir José das Neves Street. The church has a symmetrical and identical facade as seen from the square as well as from the street behind. Besides the two main entrances, there are six other entrances on the side wings; three on each.

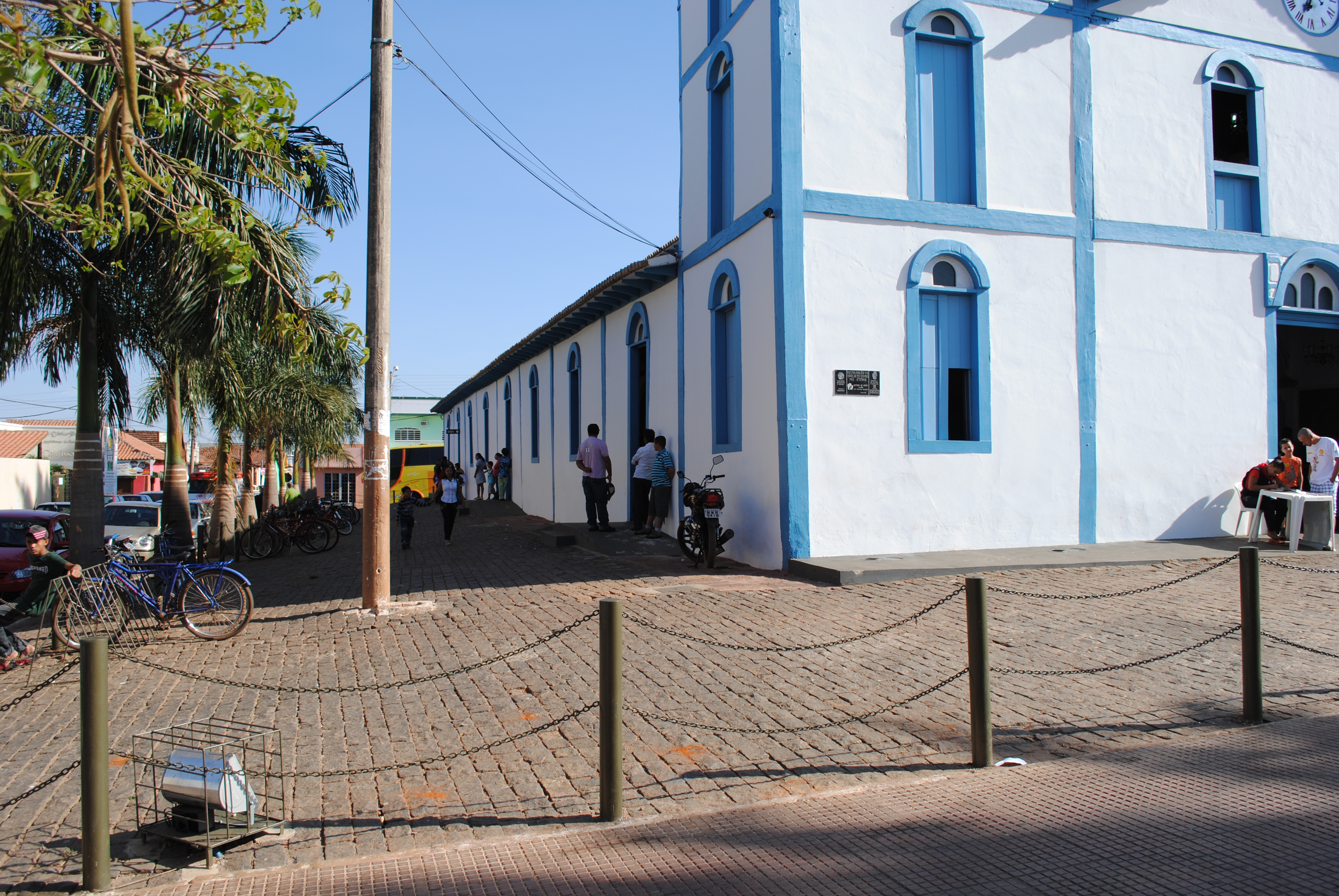
The cobblestone paving and the main door.

The current paving in the churchyard and on the edge of the church walls is made of cobblestones. The sidewalk at street level has hydraulic tile paving, as does the square where it is located. In front of the main door there is a sculpture of Father Antão Jorge and a plaque in reference to Father Renato de Ferreira, who conducted and supervised the first restoration. The current landscaping of the square dates back to 2014, when services were carried out under acceptance by Mayor Jânio Darrot, in order to highlight the site visibly to tourists and to enable the entry of numerous devotees.

It is also possible to observe the bells and the clock, which allude to the work of the Redemptorist missionaries from Bavaria, Germany. The church consists of the nave, the cortavento, the illustration of Jesus Christ crucified, the balustrade, left and right lateral altars, the main altar in the main chapel and the pulpit. There are two towers on the exterior face, with a pyramidal dome on which there is a calvary (a wooden Latin cross).

== Inside ==
=== Nave ===
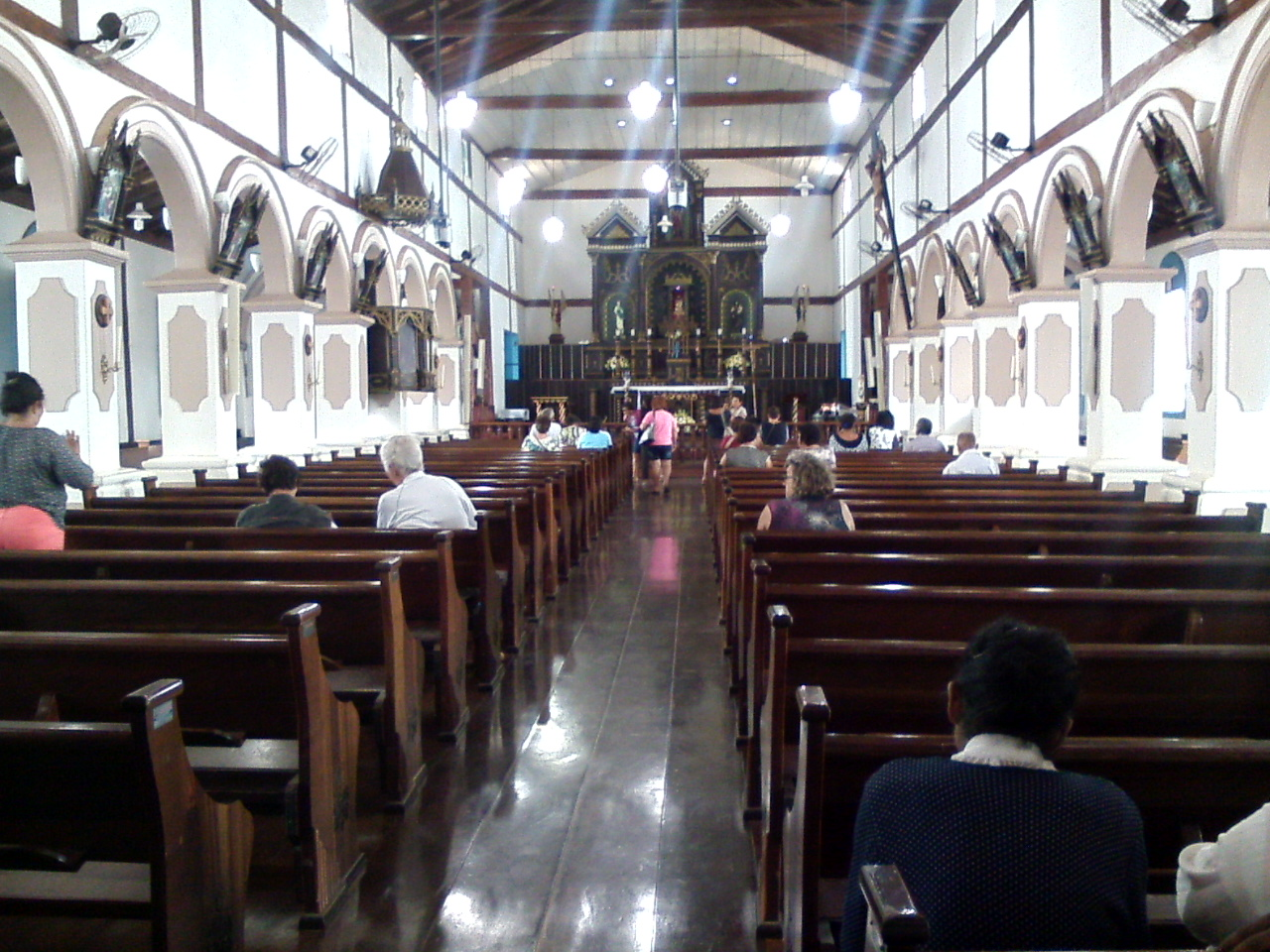
Single nave of the church.

The Parish Church of Trindade has a single nave, with an illustration of Jesus Christ crucified on the walls. The floor is wooden with different levels: the entrance, lower, occupied by the believers and the highest, near the altar, reserved for the priest. From the entrance there is a wooden choir, which has, from the nave, a door to the west and another to the east, and on the side walls of the body four windows stand out in conjunction with false parapets and baldachin, which are sash windows, painted blue, having a wooden frame with a straight lintel.

The ceiling of the nave is an acoustic type, with the smooth boards painted white. In the roof, there are two thick wooden ties, which serve to ensure the locking of the roof, in order to prevent the high walls of the church body. There are still two pulpits in the side wings accessible from the nave.

=== Main altar ===
The main altar of the church is located opposite the main entrance; therefore, it is the highlight of the temple. It has a similar structure to the nave, with adobe bricks and wooden structures, like the floor. There is a tower in the center that concentrates a group of roses and daisies and, above, the illuminated image of the Divine Eternal Father, the main figure of devotion of the believers who visit the Parish Church of Trindade. To the left, there is a tower with an illustration of the Virgin Mary and, to the right, another tower with an illustration of St. Joseph.

In front of the main altar is a pulpit where the priest speaks and gives his sermons. It is brown in color, with golden details; there is a cross, flowers around it, and a chalice above the pulpit. There are three doors (two on the left and one on the right) connecting the main altar to the presbytery.

=== Side wings ===
The church has two side wings. In the right wing, there is the baptistery and a staircase that connects to the bell room. On the left wing, there is the confessional and a 1921 painting of Father João Baptista, which alludes to the floor plan of the church, made by the German Max Schmalz. Several other objects were once displayed in the side wings, but were removed and preserved in a city museum; among them were stuffed animals, trophies, military uniforms, statues, and amulets.

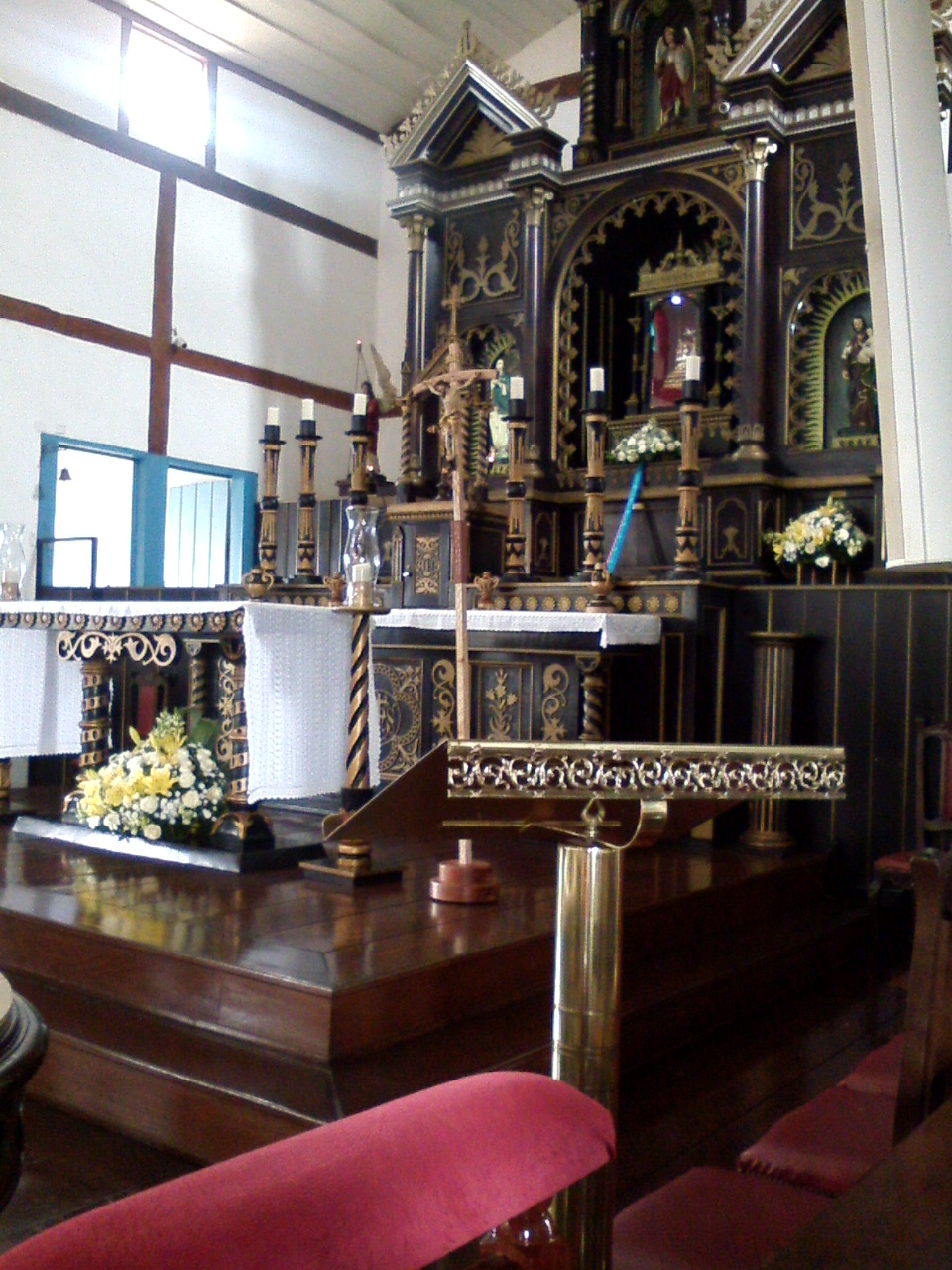
The main altar as seen from the right side wing.

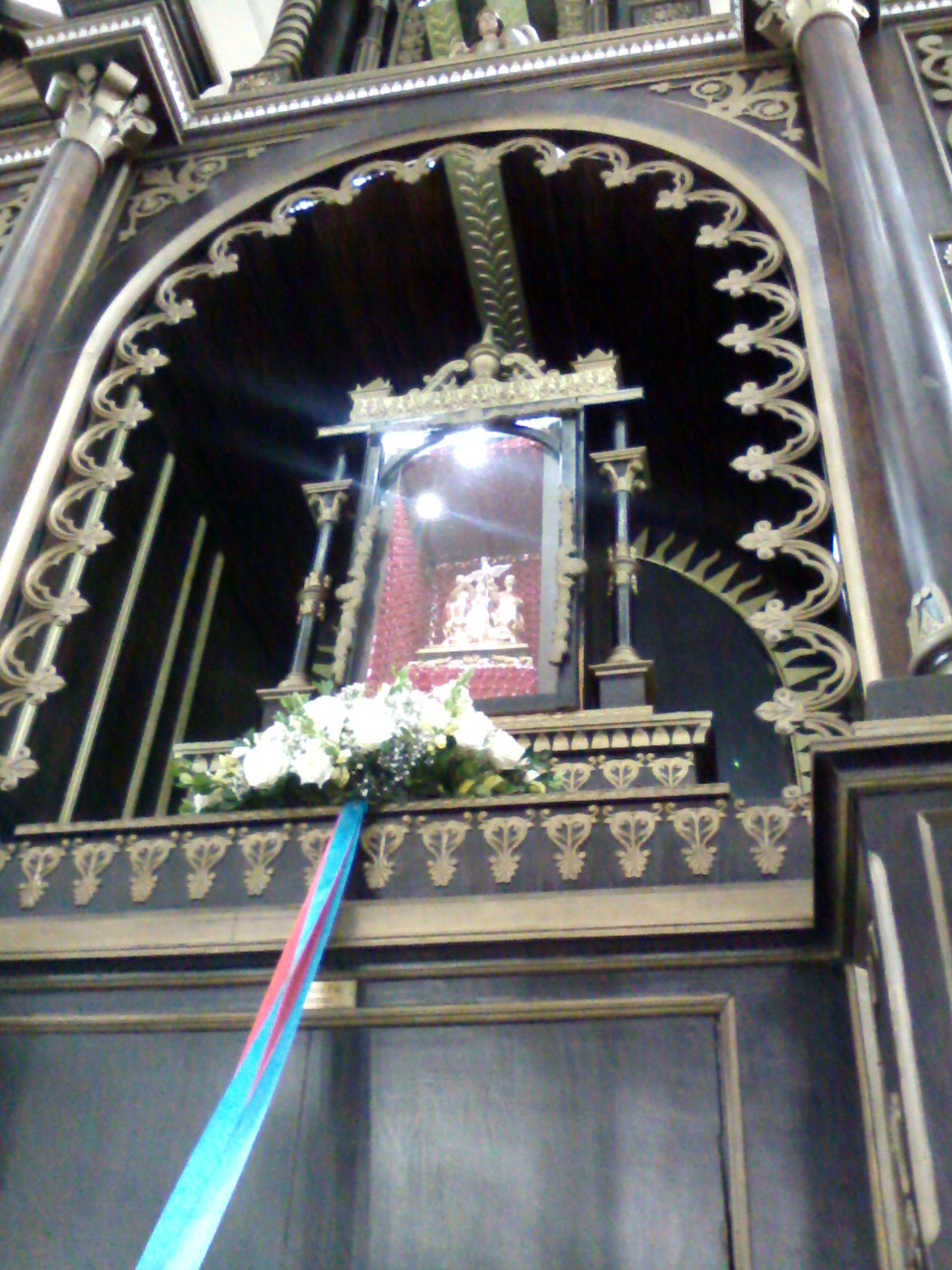
Central tower of the main altar with the image of the Divine Eternal Father.

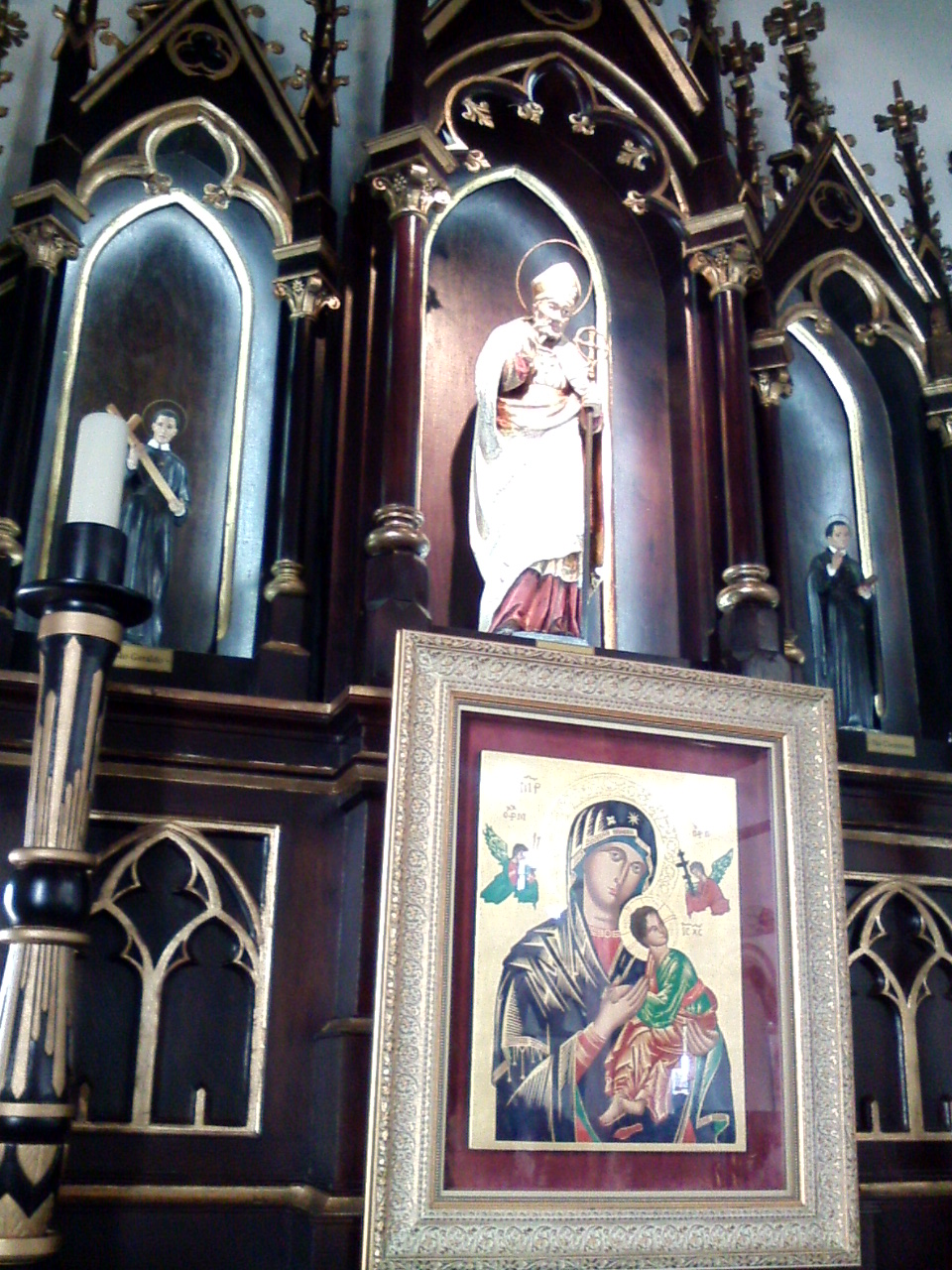
Side altar on the left side wing.

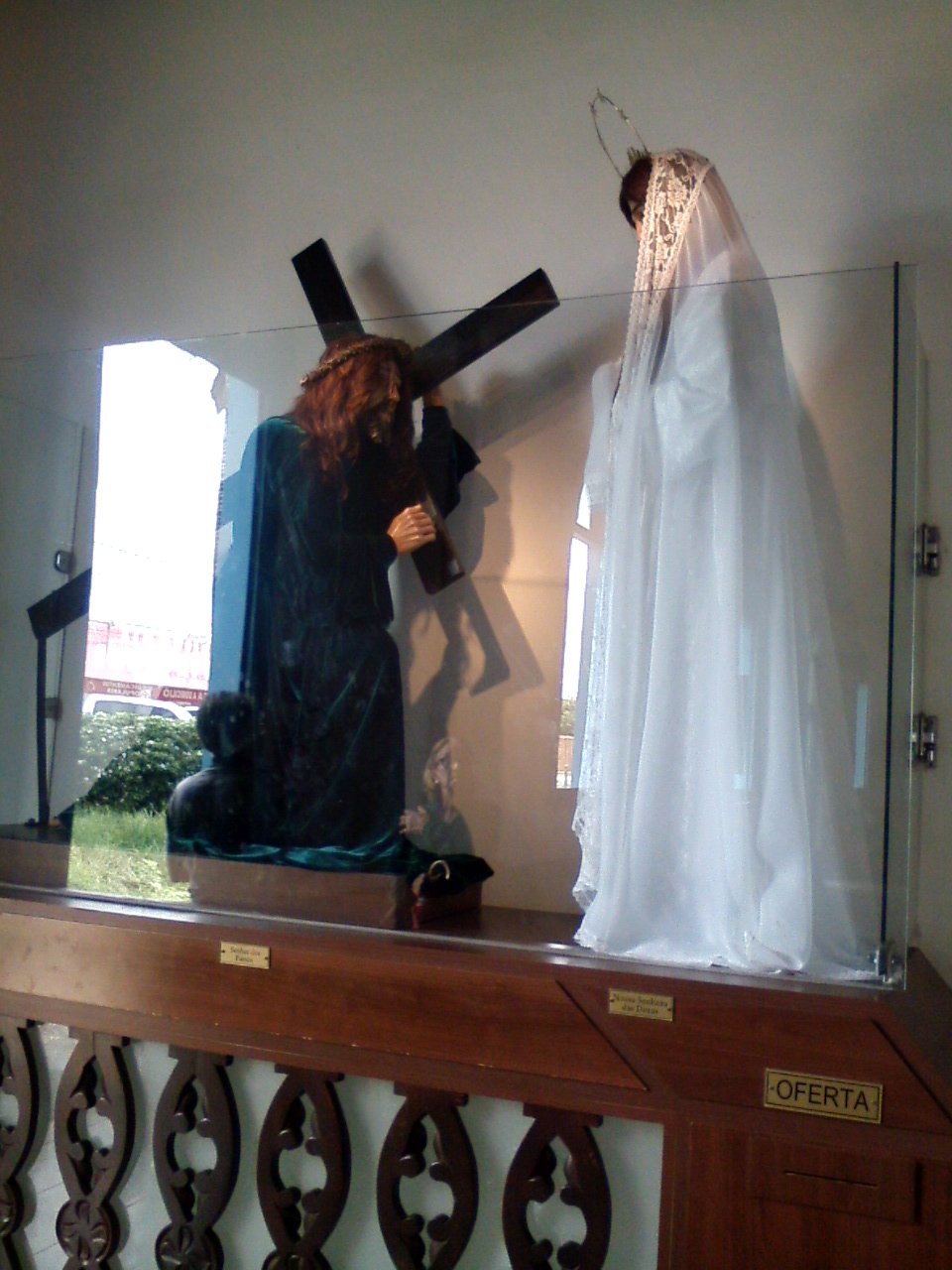
Illustration of Our Lady of Sorrows and Jesus Christ.

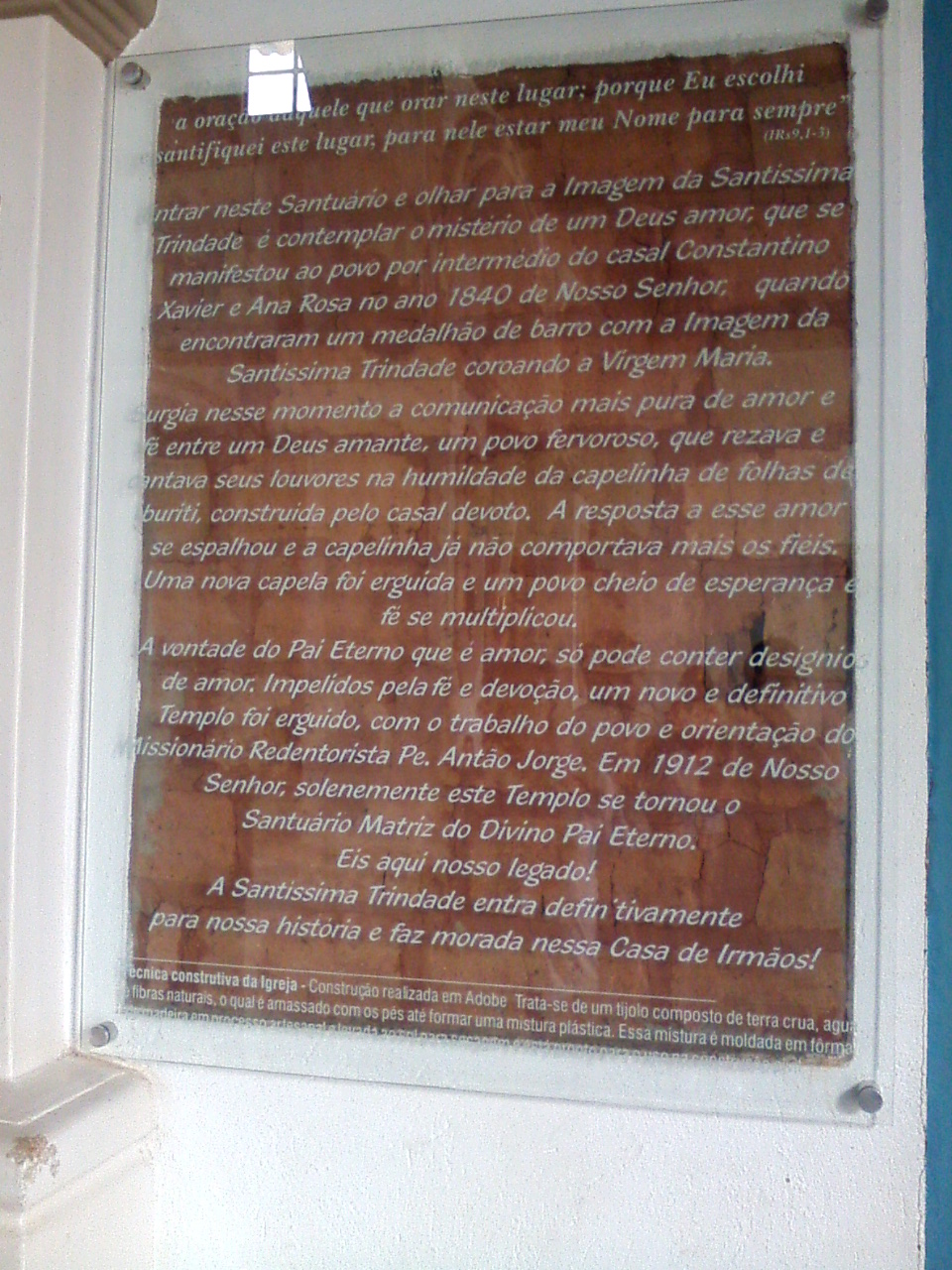
Panel with a description of the history of the church.

== Popular culture ==
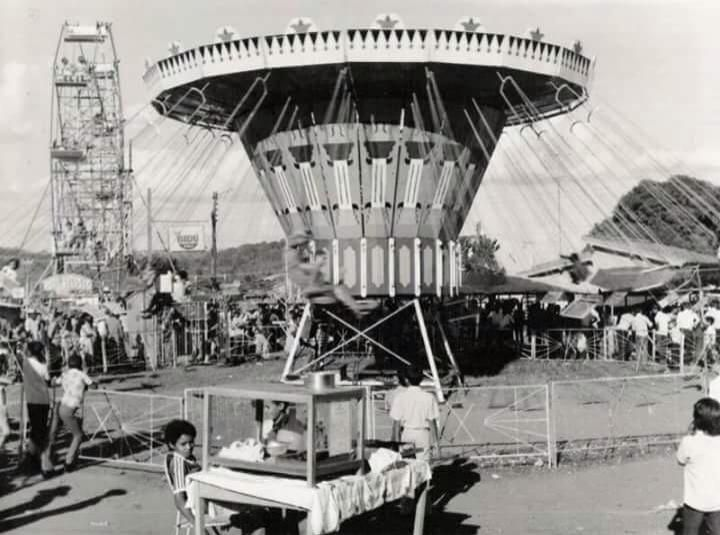
Feast of the Eternal Father, in the mid-1940s, in an area close to the Parish Church.

The Parish Church of the Divine Eternal Father is the oldest church still standing in Trindade and a witness to the vertiginous growth of the city that was favored because of the pilgrimage and the strategic position.

=== Feast of the Divine Eternal Father ===
The church became the main focus of the Feast of the Eternal Father until 1943, when the Basilica of the Eternal Father was built under the orders of Bishop Emanuel Gomes de Oliveira, in order to enable the gathering of tourists in a larger and more representative place. The event, considered the biggest in the Center-West Region and the second biggest in Brazil, occurs annually in late June and early July, for ten days, mobilizing the inhabitants of Trindade and nearby towns.

Currently, the church still remains a tourist attraction mainly during the Feast, with several celebrations occurring on the days of the pilgrimage, such as novenas and processions. At the last festival in 2016, the city welcomed 2.7 million worshippers, who visited many churches in the area.
