= Basilica of the Eternal Father, Trindade =

Coordinates: 16.6607217°S 49.4866836°W

- Basílica do Divino Pai Eterno
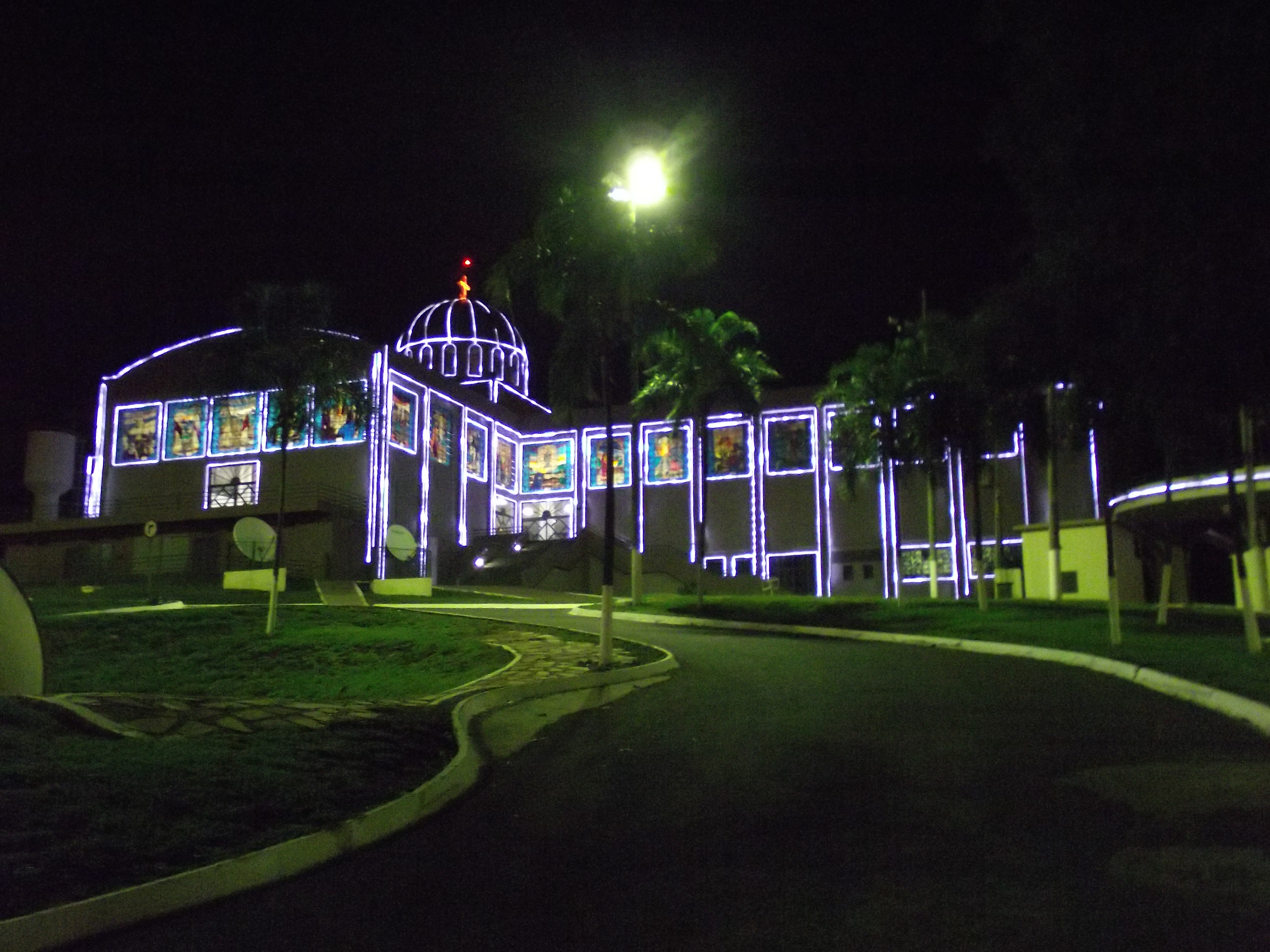
- Basilica of the Eternal Father, Trindade
- Location: Trindade
- Country: Brazil
- Denomination: Roman Catholic Church

The Basilica of the Eternal Father (Portuguese: Basílica do Divino Pai Eterno), also the Basilica of the Divine Eternal Father, is a Catholic shrine and minor basilica in the city of Trindade in the state of Goiás, Brazil. It is the only minor basilica in the world dedicated to God the Father.

== History ==
The first chapel was built in around 1848, and was covered in buriti leaves. Later, a major chapel was built on the banks of the Barro Preto creek in which the miraculous image was found. A third chapel was built in 1876. The first Shrine of the Divine Eternal Father was inaugurated in 1912 and Is known as the "ancient shrine"; it is the parent of the Parish of the Trinity.

In 1943, Don Emanuel Gomes de Oliveira, O.S.B., the Bishop of Goiás, made it the cornerstone of the new shrine. In 1955, despite all efforts, the work was not yet finished. In 1957, with the canonical erection of the Archdiocese of Goiânia, its first ordinary, Archbishop Fernando Gomes dos Santos, presented a project for the construction of the sanctuary. In 1974, it was possible to carry out the novena and the feast of the Divine Eternal Father at the site.

In 1994, renovations on the building began in order to give it the dignity of being called "Sanctuary of the Divine Eternal Father". With the help of pilgrims and devotees, the temple was completely renovated.

In 2006, Pope Benedict XVI elevated the church to the rank of minor basilica.

== See also ==
- Roman Catholicism in Brazil
- Eternal Father (disambiguation)
- Parish Church of Trindade
- Feast of the Eternal Father

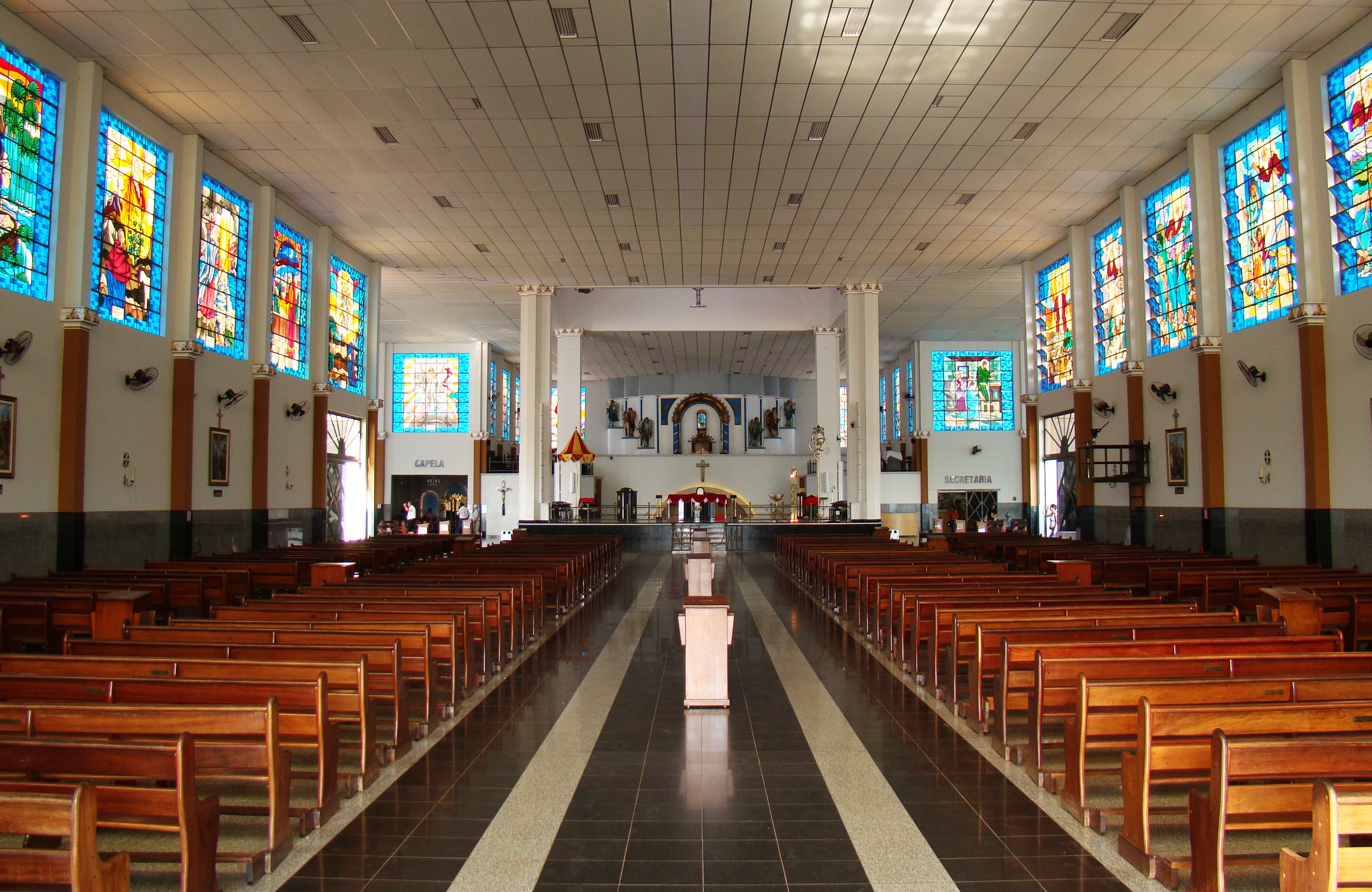
Internal View
