= Feast of the Eternal Father =

Brazilian religious event

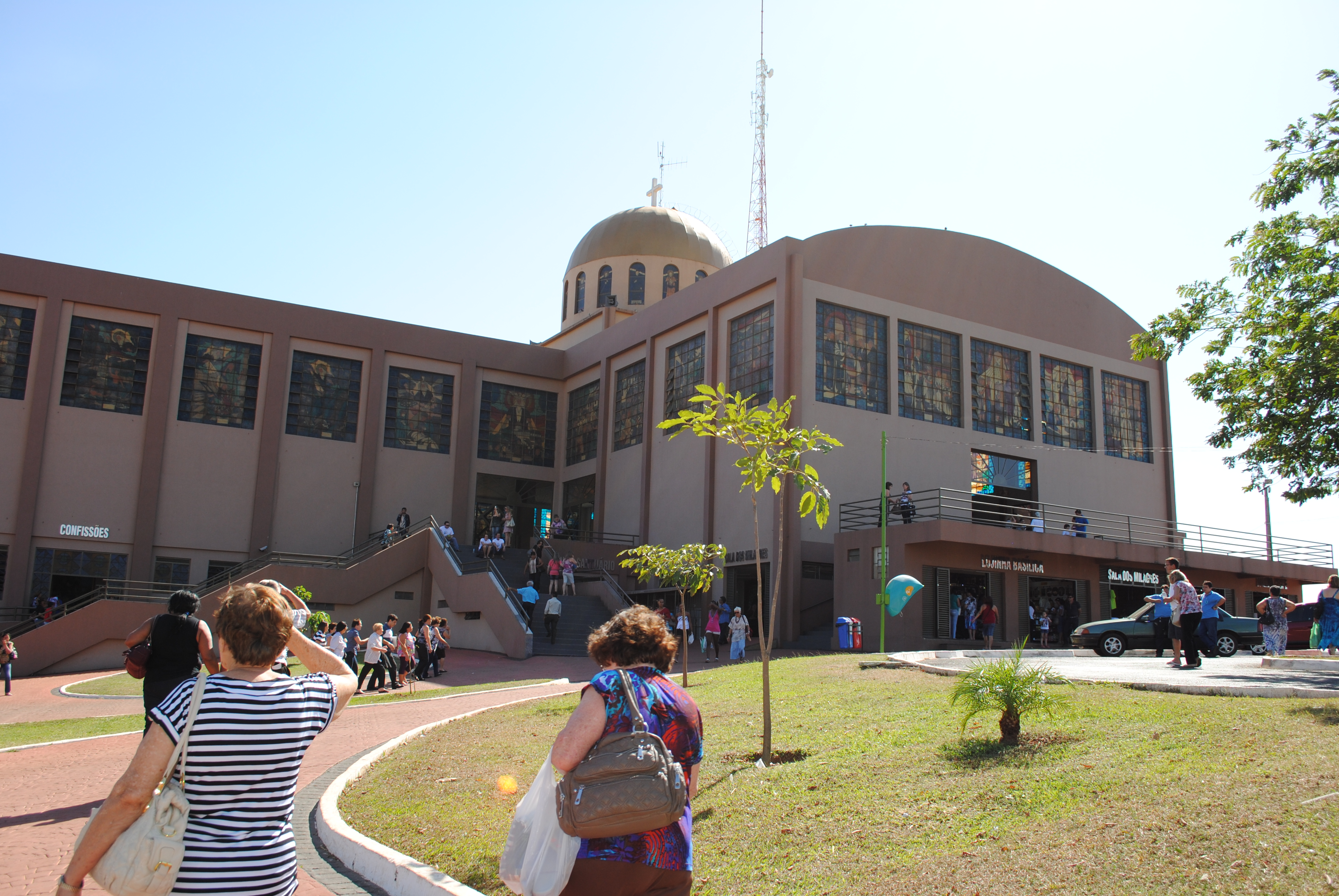
- Pilgrims visit the Basilica of the Eternal Father in Trindade.
- Observed by: Christians
- Type: Local
- Begins: Last Friday in June
- Ends: First Sunday in July
- Duration: 9 days
- Frequency: Annual

Feast of the Eternal Father, also known as the Feast of Trindade, is a cultural event that takes place annually in Trindade, Goiás. It is a traditional religious celebration that lasts nine days, starting on the last Friday of June and ending on the first Sunday of July, which attracts Catholics from all over the country to the city. The festival is a registry of popular Catholicism, characterized by pilgrimage, which is the largest in the Central-West Region and the second largest in Brazil.

The event originated in the 1840s, when the farming couple Ana Rosa and Constantino Xavier found a medallion with the figure of the Holy Trinity in the former village of Barro Preto, starting a devotion movement to that image. Over the years, the pilgrimage consolidated and continued to expand, having gone through an institutionalization process at the end of the 19th century and adapting to ecclesiastic orders during the 20th century. Since then, many temples of worship to the Eternal Father were built and became symbols of the feast, such as the Parish Church of Trindade, the Basilica of the Eternal Father and the New Basilica Sanctuary.

The sacred and the profane are mixed in the celebration. There is, on one hand, the novena and popular piety, marked by the route of the pilgrims through urban and rural roads - with emphasis on the parade of ox carts - and, on the other, non-religious programs, such as the installation of commercial stalls, gambling and amusement parks. The event is highly profitable for the city of Trindade, and in its largest edition, in 2019, the Feast of the Eternal Father received more than 3.2 million tourists.

== History ==
=== Discovery of the medallion and the first years of the pilgrimage ===
The history of the Feast of the Eternal Father dates back to the 1840s, when the farming couple Ana Rosa and Constantino Xavier found, on the banks of a stream in the village of Barro Preto, now Trindade, a medallion with the image of the coronation of the Virgin Mary by the Holy Trinity. The discovery of the icon started a devotion movement to the figure of the Eternal Father, which gradually expanded and brought more faithful to the region where it was found. The village was located in the center of Goiás and was, more specifically, a parish of the city of Campininha das Flores, which, years later, would become Campinas, a district of Goiânia. There were several transfers of ox carts coming from the interior of the state, transporting the sertanejos (people from the sertão) to the couple's house on Saturdays, a mark of rural tradition already in the early years of the pilgrimage.

With the fast expansion of the movement, Ana Rosa and Constantino Xavier realized that there was no way to gather all the pilgrims in their house anymore. Therefore, both built a ranch that included the stream where the medallion was discovered and, in 1843, the first feast was officially held. That year, the celebration included masses and processions, in addition to the side presence of commerce, which sought to raise funds for the construction of a chapel where the medallion would remain exposed. The sacred and the profane, simultaneously - religious and commercial practices - have persisted throughout history, remaining one of the main characteristics of the event. The ritualistic displacement of ox carts, sertanejo music and the arrival of the faithful on their knees were also already present in the first edition of the feast.

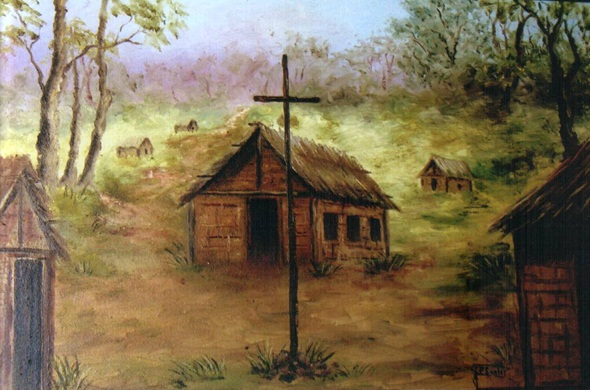
Chapel built by Ana Rosa and Constantino Xavier in 1848. The medallion found by the couple was displayed in it.

In 1848, the farming couple managed to erect the desired chapel. At first, the chapel, on the banks of the water course, was covered with buriti leaves. It was the first construction where the figure of the Holy Trinity would be on display for the devotees, transported in the following decades to larger locations. In the same year, another tradition was started: the feast would last for nine days, ending on the first Sunday of July. With this intense movement of people, the medallion image wore out, and, in 1850, Constantino Xavier asked sculptor José Joaquim da Veiga Valle, from Pirenópolis, to produce a larger replica in wood, also displayed to the public.

Another chapel, made of masonry and covered with tiles, was designed in 1866. Gradually, the settlement of the village kept up with the growth in the number of inhabitants and the faithful, and the expansion of the pilgrimage, along more roads and trails in Goiás, calling more and more people to the annual celebration. The Feast of the Holy Trinity of Barro Preto, as it was known, progressed in the second half of the 19th century, under the presence of rites and superstitions and the tradition of walking through the Goias' lands, with harnessed animals, rosaries, crosses, flags, and followed by the manifestations of piety, a register of a popular Catholicism.

=== Institutionalization and local conflicts ===
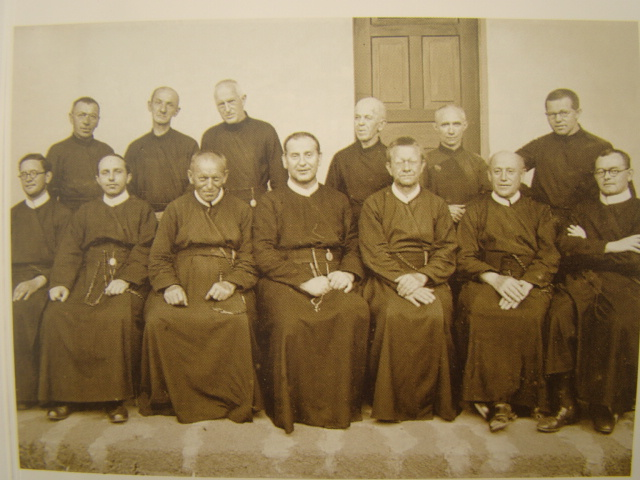
German Redemptorist missionaries brought to the village of Barro Preto in 1894 to control religious activities.

Noticing the spread of religious practices, including the feast itself, Bishop Joaquim Gonçalves de Azevedo promoted the construction of an even larger chapel in 1888, administered by a lay commission. This group called itself the Brotherhood, responsible for the organization of festive programs in the village, such as masses, novenas and fairs. The feast, bigger every year, witnessed the ritual solemnity and devotion around the image of the Eternal Father at the same time that commerce, gambling, singing and dancing took place outdoors.

However, after the appointment of Bishop Eduardo Duarte e Silva to the Diocese of Goiás, the management of the feast underwent some changes. Behind these changes was the desire to Christianize the pilgrimage and have access to the money collected in the event, decisions that came into conflict with the Brotherhood and local leaders. The profane events and the ignorance of the amount of money moved by the pilgrimage were Don Eduardo's justification to try to transform popular piety into a process of sanctification.

Barro Preto, an insignificant district, was only known for the many miracles that the simplicity of the people attributed not to God but to (...) that group of small images and until I installed the Redemptorist Fathers there, it was nothing more than a place where for twelve days helped merchants from all over the state of Goiás, cowboys, peddlers, prostitutes, circuses of horses and thousands of superstitions, devotees who went there to pay their promises, often made to obtain from God things against Christian morals: Revenge, separation of couples, adultery, etc.! What indecency! How much ignorance! How much hygiene offenses!

— D. Eduardo Duarte e Silva

According to the bishop of Goiás at the time, dancing, gambling, drinking and prostitution that marked the popular festivities needed to be excluded from a Christian celebration and, for this to happen, an extreme institutionalization was required, which put at the head of the organization of the event official names from the church. Father Francisco Inácio de Sousa was named by Don Eduardo to manage the chapel and the movements around it, and Redemptorist missionaries from the state of Bavaria, Germany, were brought to Goiás after a trip to Rome by the bishop. Among the Germans who stood out the most in the missions to which they were assigned were Antão Jorge Hechensblarkner and Pelágio Sauter, who were important figures in the construction of buildings larger than the chapel. It was up to the missionaries, besides spreading the voice of Catholicism in the formal molds of the church, to control the public coffers of the temple and the region.

In the 1896 edition, the changes promoted by Don Eduardo became more evident. The work of the Redemptorist missionaries and priests was reflected in a festive program that contemplated only the formal aspects, restricting the commercial activity and, consequently, the leisure activities that the pilgrims were used to. This new scenario caused the dissatisfaction of those who attended the feast and led to a decrease in the number of participants in the following years. Furthermore, the bishop's impositions also displeased local authorities and led to a direct confrontation between Don Eduardo and Colonel Anacleto Gonçalves de Almeida.

Due to the conflicts, the bishop signed in 1900 the Interdict, which prescribed the interruption of the event. After popular and governmental pressure, the decision was reversed in 1903, and the feast resumed with the simultaneous presence of commerce and religious practices.

=== Expansion and national amplitude ===
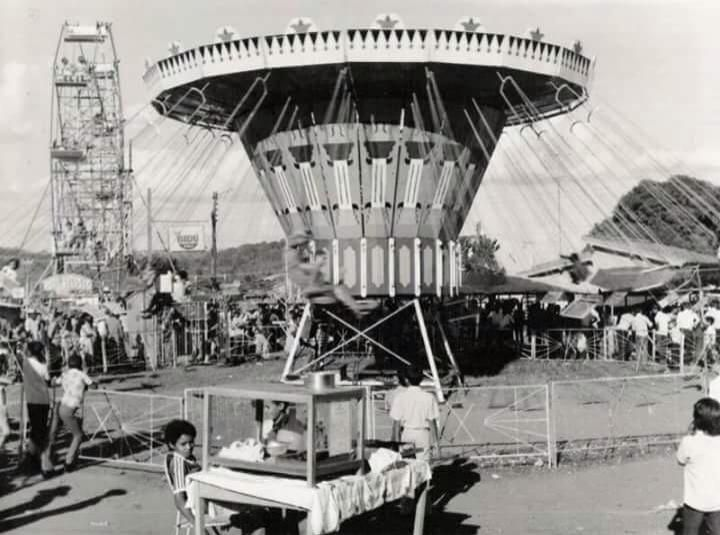
Amusement park built in one of the editions of the feast in the 1950s.

The chaotic occupation and the large population that transformed the scenery of the small settlement gave indications of what the city of Trindade would become. In the early years of the 20th century, the feast kept developing and was essential for the foundation of the municipality in 1920. The Parish Church of Trindade, built in 1912, on the same site where the first chapel was erected with buriti leaves, becomes the main symbol of the pilgrimage, for being the arrival point of the pilgrims who come to the city. About 15 thousand people attended the feast at this time.

Traditionally, men and women from the countryside of Goiás would prepare in May and June for the pilgrimage and move in ox carts along the roads in search of the sacred. Others preferred to arrive to the region isolated or in smaller groups, by walking or kneeling without the oxen. Gradually, the ways to get to the current city of Trindade became more and more diversified, without losing traditions. In the nine days preceding the first Sunday in July, a kind of fair-feast was set up in the territory, keeping the religious practices, already organized by the presence of the church, alongside the popular movement, which set up stalls in the streets selling a wide variety of products, such as food, drinks, religious and even erotic items.

Due to the growth of the pilgrimage, another institution was planned to receive the pilgrims. In 1946, the cornerstone of the Basilica of the Eternal Father was laid by orders of Archbishop Emanuel Gomes de Oliveira; however, the construction only started in 1957 by determination of Don Fernando Gomes dos Santos. Planned to receive 10 thousand people, the church was inaugurated in 1974, twelve years after the beginning of its construction. It can be noticed, therefore, the adaptation of the feast to the ecclesiastic orders during the 20th century, keeping the popular Catholicism. In this period, many religious associations were established in Trindade, such as the Apostleship of Prayer, the Sons of Mary Fraternity and the Congregation of Marian.

In the 21st century, the feast began to receive more prominence on the national level, attracting tourists from other states and being reported and televised in Brazil and internationally. Considering the exponential growth, religious authorities founded the Sons of the Eternal Father Association (Afipe), in 2004, interested in grouping devotees and disseminating Christian practices through various projects, such as TV Pai Eterno. In 2016, it sought to collect signatures of pilgrims for Pope Francis' visit to the Sanctuary. In 2020, after decades of uninterrupted performance, the event was cancelled due to the COVID-19 pandemic. The following year, in 2021, with the pandemic period remaining, it was held virtually with a reduced program.

== Schedule ==
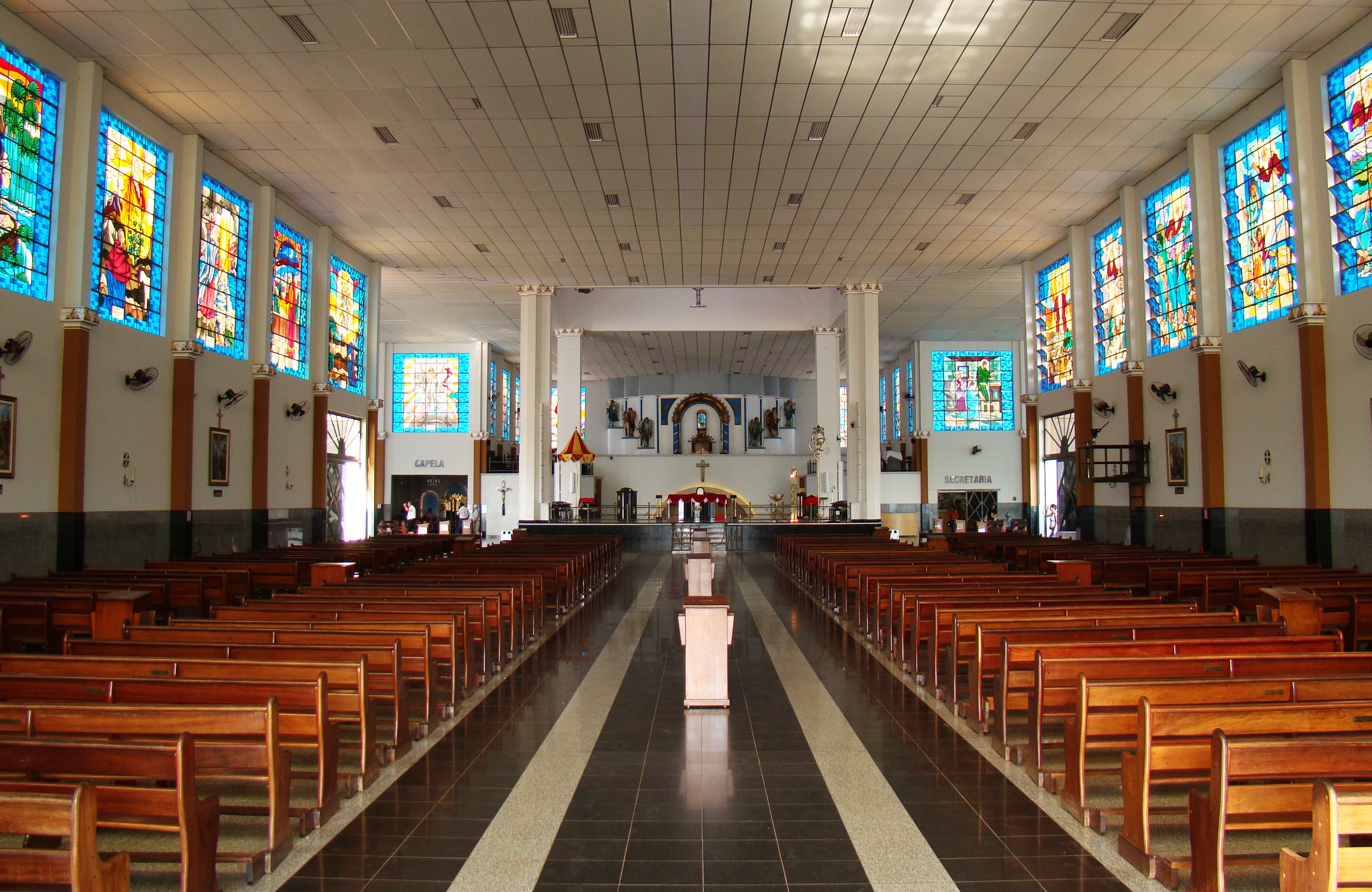
Countless masses are held in the Basilica of the Eternal Father during the novena.

Each year, the attractions of the Feast of the Eternal Father are changed, but some traditions are maintained. Regarding the religious practices, the novena, a set of prayers that lasts nine days - in this case, from the last Friday of June to the first Sunday of July -, with masses at different times, stands out. The Catholic pilgrimage is also one of the main characteristics of the event. Many pilgrims come from different regions of the country to the city, having temples such as the Parish Church of Trindade and, mainly, the Basilica of the Eternal Father as destinations. Although there are many ways to get to Trindade, the journey on foot through the many urban and rural roads of Goiás is still the most remarkable, especially crossing GO-060, popularly known as Rodovia dos Romeiros (English: Pilgrims' Highway), which connects Goiânia to Trindade.

One of the most traditional ways to attend the feast is by ox carts. Since the beginning of the celebration, traveling on the roads for several days required from the pilgrims ways to carry supplies, and the practice of herding animals was the most popular alternative. During the nine days of the feast, hundreds of ox carts parade through the streets of the city towards Trindade's Carreiródromo, located in the Lara Guimarães Municipal Park, a tradition that has been recognized by the National Institute of Historic and Artistic Heritage as a Cultural Heritage of Brazil. Besides the parade, other attractions take place on this stage, such as quadrilhas (square dance groups) and musical shows, especially singers and sertanejo music duos.

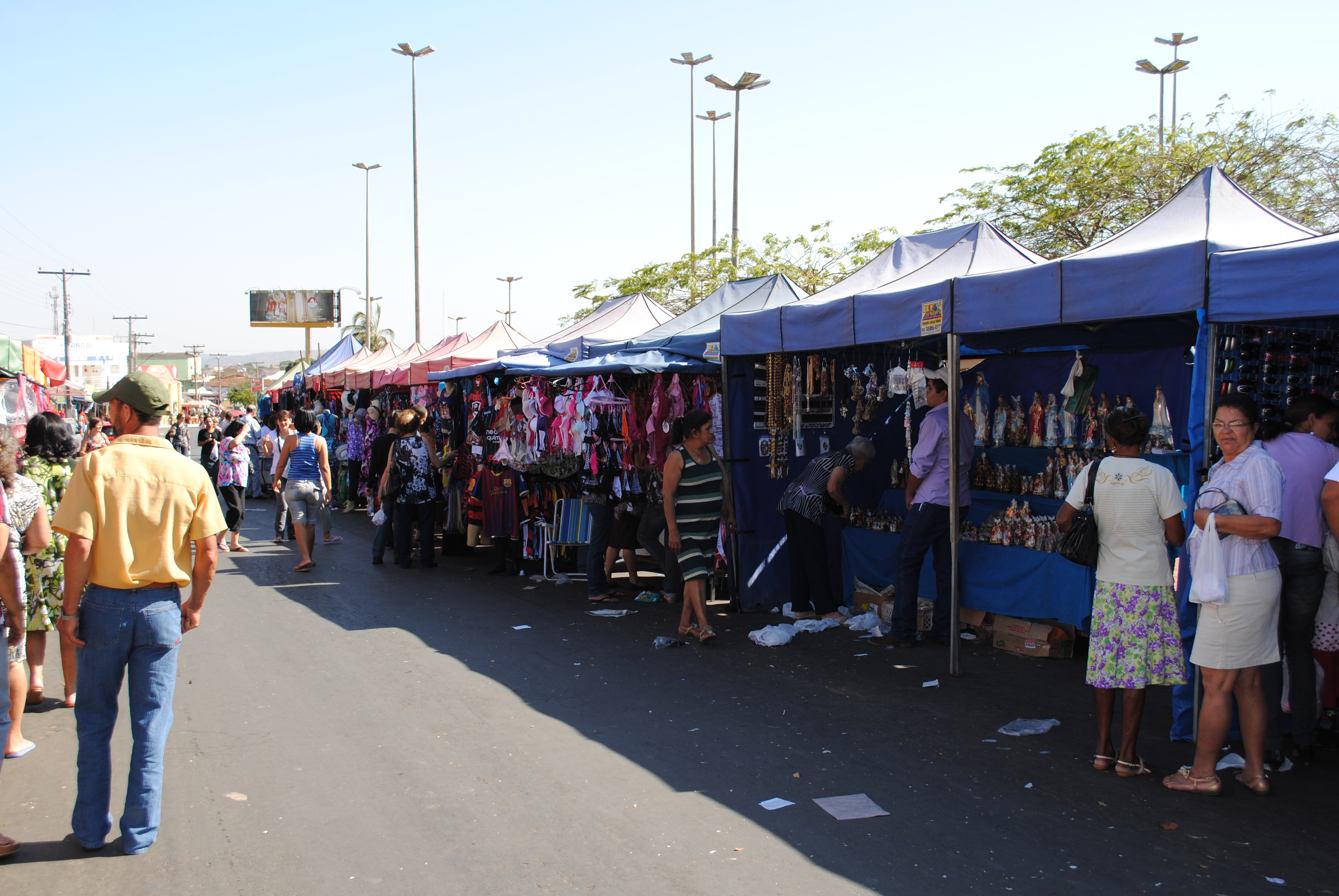
Besides the religious practices, commercial stalls are set up in the streets of Trindade during the feast.

It is also common the installation of commercial stalls in the main streets where the pilgrims cross. The composition of a fair-feast is remarkable in the event since the first editions, which includes the union of the sacred with the profane. The commercialized products are quite diversified, and the stalls are set up both by Trindade inhabitants and by tourists from other cities that are mobilized by the commercial projection that the event provides. The food and drink stalls stand out mainly, with the sale of pastéis, churros, and crêpes, in addition to the typical June party, such as canjica and quentão, and typical Goiânia cuisine, such as pamonha and empadão. There are also stalls for the sale of clothing, household goods, religious products and children's toys. Although movement is bigger during the nine days of the feast, some stalls usually appear ten to fifteen days before the beginning of the event, remaining for up to a week after its end.

In the event, there are other festive programs, predominantly nocturnal, that take place in the city streets. Several games are set up in some stalls, either for children or adults, such as pinball, bingo, and target shooting. There is an amusement park that is annually set up in the central region of Trindade, hosting mainly children and teenagers.

== Reach and repercussion ==
The Feast of the Eternal Father and the history of Trindade are intertwined. The constant route around the former village of Barro Preto had a direct impact on the geographical way the Trindade is arranged. The first buildings that would strengthen the structure of the city in the way it is recognized today were built in 1920 on the banks of the stream. Over the years, the route of the pilgrims continued to influence the urban organization of Trindade, with emphasis on the development of the eastern region in intense conurbation with Goiânia, the main path towards the feast.

The territorial expansion of the municipality is related to the event's increasing growth. In the early years it was a local celebration restricted to the communities in the interior of Goiás, but the feast grew to receive more than 3.2 million pilgrims in the 2010s. In the 20th century, the celebration was consolidated as the biggest religious event in the Central-West Region and the second biggest in Brazil, second only to the tourist stay of Aparecida. It is reported that, in 1911, 5 thousand people attended the event, a number that increased in the following decades: 20 thousand in 1922; 100 thousand in 1960, and 200 thousand in 1970.

== Bibliography ==
- Amaral, Arthur Pires (2011). "Campininha das Flores: narrativas de um drama social". Ponto Urbe. 8 (8). doi:10.4000/pontourbe.1878.
- Batista, Walquiria (2019). "História e teatro em Trindade-GO: Do Barro Preto à Rua da Alegria". Em Tese. 24 (1): 174–189. doi:10.17851/1982-0739.24.1.174-189.
- D'Abadia, Maria Idelma (2011). Diversidade e identidade religiosa: uma leitura espacial dos padroeiros e seus festejos em Muquém, Abadiânia e Trindade-GO (PhD). Federal University of Goiás.
- França, Rames. "As trajetórias socioespaciais dos Carreiros da Fé da Romaria do Divino Pai Eterno, em Goiás". Federal University of Goiás.
- Finotti, Ademir; Silva, Nélia (2020). "Os encantos do Messias: teatro, romaria e vestimentas na Caminhada de Fé do grupo teatral Desencanto de Trindade (GO)". Caminhos. 19 (3): 743–761. doi:10.18224/cam.v18i3.8255. S2CID 234445019.
- Jacób, Amir. A santíssima Trindade de Barro Preto: história da romaria de Trindade. Goiânia: Publisher of Pontifical Catholic University of Goiás.
- Leal, Oscar (1980). Viagem às terras goyanas (Brazil Central). Goiânia: Publisher of Pontifical Catholic University of Goiás.
- Magalhães; Oliveira, Amanda. "Oficina de Panificação: momento de expressão da cultura campesina". Brazilian Journal of Development. 7 (1): 2524–2537. doi:10.34117/bjdv7n1-172. S2CID 234138896.
- Maia, Carlos (2005). "Vox Populi Vox Dei! A romanização e as reformas das Festas de Santo". Espaço e Cultura. 17: 89–106.
- Maia, Carlos; Coelho, Tito (2005). "Tradições da roça na festa do Divino Pai Eterno em Trindade (GO): comércio periódico e romaria de carros de bois". Agrária. 1 (3): 105–122. doi:10.11606/issn.1808-1150.v0i3p103-122.
- Martins Filho, José Reinaldo (2018). "Música e identidade na Romaria ao Divino Pai Eterno de Trindade, Goiás". Música Hodie. 18 (2): 229–244. doi:10.5216/mh.v18i2.51137. S2CID 239596092.
- Nascimento, Silvana de Souza (2012). "Homem com homem, mulher com mulher: paródias sertanejas no interior de Goiás". Cadernos Pagu. 39 (39): 367–402. doi:10.1590/S0104-83332012000200013.
- Oliveira, Irene; Rosa, Rafael (2012). "A religiosidade trinitária do povo goiano". Horizonte. 9. Belo Horizonte: 763–781. doi:10.5752/P.2175-5841.2011v9n23p763.
- Pereira, Denis Biolkino; Ferreira, William (2020). "Reflexos das ocupações urbanas na mobilidade às margens da rodovia estadual GO-060 entre Goiânia (GO) e Trindade (GO)". Cerrados. 18 (1): 189–219. doi:10.22238/rc2448269220201801189219. S2CID 219480139.
- Wagner, Rezende; Cunha, Guilherme de Moura (2021). "Silenced rituals: religious ambiences in Trindade in the context of COVID-19". Washington D.C.: AAG Annual Meeting.
- Rodrigues, Wildes Jesus; Deus, João Batista; Chaveiro, Eguimar Felício (2021). "A análise do voto como metodologia de compreensão da dinâmica urbana: estudo aplicado à cidade de Trindade – GO". Geografia (Londrina). 30 (1): 323–343. doi:10.5433/2447-1747.2021v30n1p323. S2CID 234459581.
- Santos, Leila Borges Dias (2009). "Disputa pelo sagrado em Goiás em fins do século XIX: o catolicismo oficial dos bispos ultramontanos e o catolicismo popular dos leigos". Revista Brasileira de História das Religiões. 1 (3): 347–380.
- Santos, Miguel Archângelo (1978). Trindade de Goiás: uma cidade santuário — Conjunturas de um fenômeno religioso no Centro-Oeste brasileiro (MA). University of São Paulo.
- Silva, Eduardo Duarte e (1899). "Pastoral sobre o culto interno e externo e regulamento para as festividades e funcções religiosas". Scuola Tipográfica Salesiana: 63.
