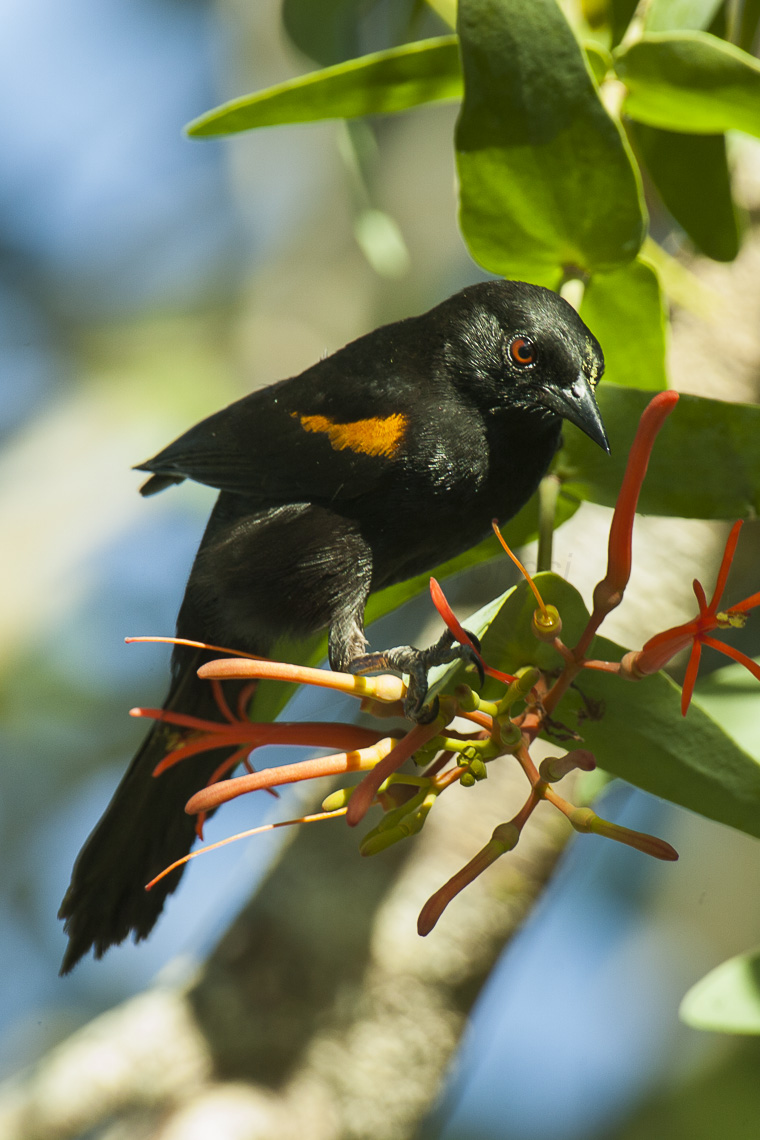

Conservation status
- Least Concern (IUCN 3.1)

- Least Concern (IUCN 3.1)

Scientific classification
- Kingdom: Animalia
- Phylum: Chordata
- Class: Aves
- Order: Passeriformes
- Family: Icteridae
- Genus: Icterus
- Species: I. cayanensis

Binomial name
- Icterus cayanensis (Linnaeus, 1766)

Synonyms
- See text

= Epaulet oriole =

Species of bird

The epaulet oriole (Icterus cayanensis) is a species of bird in the family Icteridae, the oropendolas, New World orioles, and New World blackbirds. It is found in Bolivia, Brazil, Colombia, Ecuador, French Guiana, Guyana, Peru, Suriname, Trinidad, and Venezuela.

== Taxonomy and systematics ==
The epaulet oriole was formally described in 1766 with the binomial Oriolus cayanensis. Since then it has a complicated taxonomic history.

For much of the twentieth century some authors considered it and the moriche oriole (I. chrysocephalus) to be individual monotypic species. Other authors treated chrysocephalus as a subspecies of I. cayanensis. In the twenty-first century most taxonomic systems have adopted the latter position. However, as of late 2025 BirdLife International's Handbook of the Birds of the World (HBW) retains the two taxa as separate species. The Clements taxonomy recognizes some distinctions within the species, calling I. c. cayanensis the "epaulet oriole (epaulet)" and I. c. chrysocephalus the "epaulet oriole (moriche)".

In the mid-twentieth century one author placed the epaulet oriole and the orchard oriole (I. spurius) in a separate genus Bananivorus but later work showed that they belonged in Icterus.

Also for much of the twentieth century and into the twenty-first, what are now the four subspecies of the variable oriole (I. pyrrhopterus) were treated as subspecies of the epaulet oriole. The variable oriole was recognized as a full species beginning in 2010.

This article follows the majority of systems by assigning the epaulet oriole two subspecies, the nominate I. c. cayanensis and I. c. chrysocephalus.

== Description ==
The epaulet oriole is about 22 cm (8.7 in) long. Males weigh an average of about 45 g (1.6 oz) and females an average of about 42 g (1.5 oz). The sexes have the same plumage. Adults of the nominate subspecies are almost entirely black. They have yellow lesser and median wing coverts that show as the eponymous epaulet on the closed wing. Subspecies I. c. chrysocephalus is also mostly black but has a golden-yellow crown, nape, rump, epaulets, and thighs. Juveniles of both subspecies are blackish brown rather than pure black and their yellow parts are duller than adults'. Both subspecies have a brown to deep red-brown iris, a blackish bill, and leaden gray to blackish legs and feet.

== Distribution and habitat ==
The epaulet oriole is a bird of the Amazon Basin. Subspecies I. c. chrysocephalus is the more northwesterly of the two. It is found from the southeastern half of Colombia south through eastern Ecuador into northern Peru as far as Huánuco Department. Its range extends east through southern and far eastern Venezuela and the Guianas and northern Brazil's Roraima and Amazonas states. It also occurs on Trinidad, though that population may be descended from escaped cage birds. The nominate subspecies' range slightly overlaps that of I. c. chrysocephalus in the Guianas. Its range otherwise extends south and east from that of chrysocephalus to encompass Amazonian Brazil, eastern Peru, and northern Bolivia.

The epaulet oriole inhabits a variety of landscapes including the edges, clearings, and canopy of mature forest, swamp forest, gallery forest, and sometimes parks and gardens. In much of its range it favors moriche palm (Mauritia flexuosa) groves in marshes and along waterways. In elevation in Brazil it ranges from sea level to 900 m (3,000 ft). It reaches 1,050 m (3,400 ft) in Colombia, 500 m (1,600 ft) in Ecuador, and 1,500 m (4,900 ft) in Peru. In Venezuela it reaches only 200 m (700 ft) north of the Orinoco River but 1,200 m (3,900 ft) south of it.

== Behavior ==
=== Movement ===
The epaulet oriole is a year-round resident and is apparently sedentary.

=== Feeding ===
The epaulet oriole's diet has not been studied but is believed to be mostly insects and other arthropods. It is known to feed on fruits, nectar, and sap. It usually forages singly or in pairs but does join mixed-species feeding flocks. It forages mostly in the forest canopy but in more open areas will seek food even down to the ground.

=== Breeding ===
The epaulet oriole's breeding season has not been fully defined. It spans August to October in French Guiana, September to February in Suriname, and July to January in northwestern Brazil. Its nest is a "hammock" woven from plant fibers and attached to the underside of a large leaf or palm frond. The typical clutch is two eggs that are creamy or bluish white with brown markings. The incubation period and time to fledging are not known. Both parents provision nestlings but other details of parental care are not known. The shiny cowbird (Molothrus bonariensis) is believed to parasitize epaulet oriole nests.

=== Vocalization ===
The two subspecies of the epaulet oriole have different but similar songs. That of the nominate is "not very musical and has been described as a varied series of ascending and descending notes, also mixing clicks and buzzes". That of I. c. chrysocephalus is "a slow series of ascending and descending notes, usually grouped in phrases of two to three notes". The species' calls include "short nasal notes or mewing sounds" and it also mimics the vocalizations of other bird species.

== Status ==
The IUCN follows HBW taxonomy and therefore has separately assessed the two subspecies of the epaulet oriole. Both have very large ranges. Neither population size is known but both are believed to be stable. No immediate threats to either have been identified. The epaulet oriole is considered fairly common in Colombia and Peru, "somewhat local and seldom very numerous" in Venezuela, and "frequent to uncommon" in Brazil. The species is "frequently trapped for exploitation as part of the caged-bird trade".
