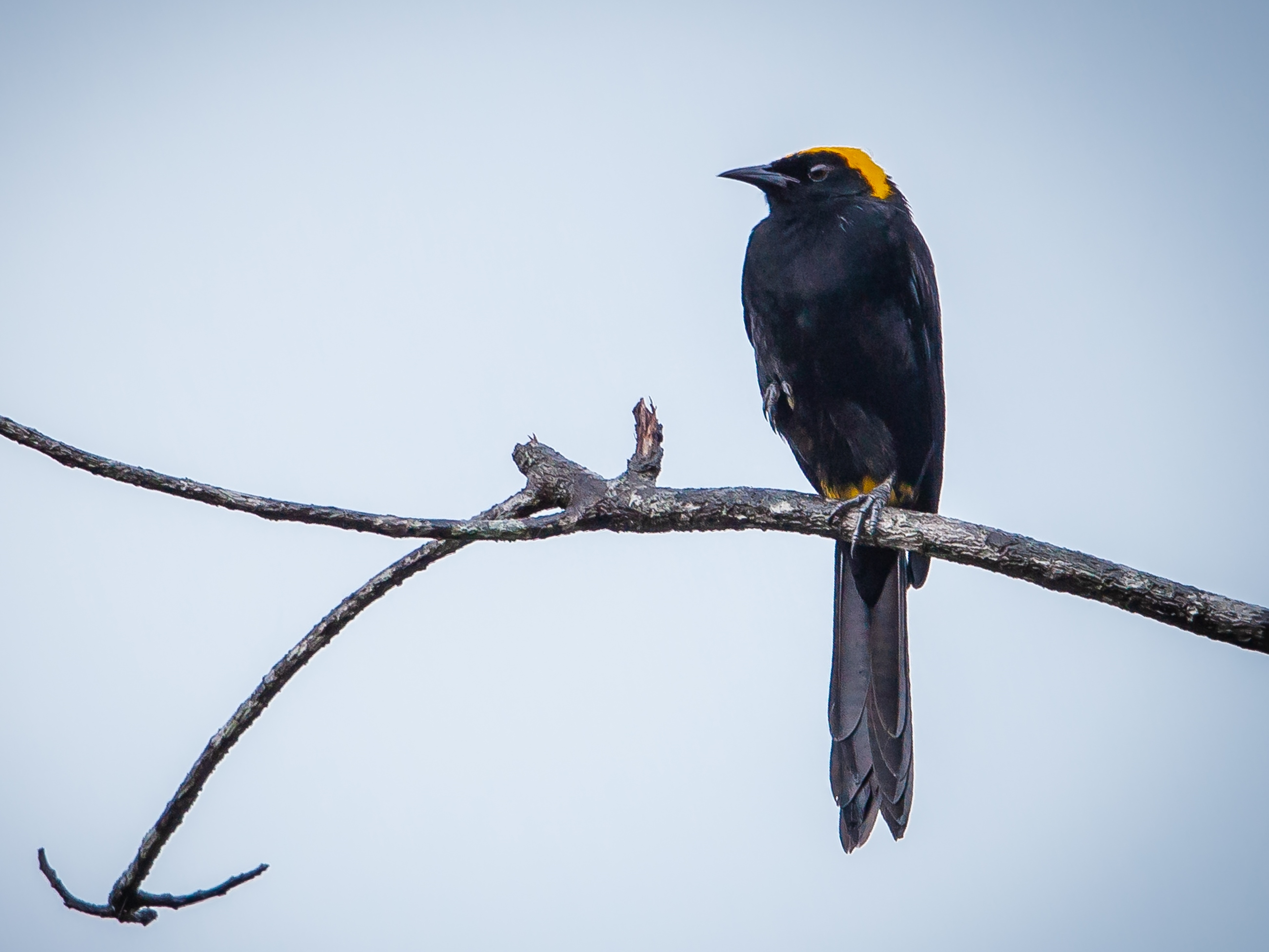

Scientific classification
- Kingdom: Animalia
- Phylum: Chordata
- Class: Aves
- Order: Passeriformes
- Family: Icteridae
- Genus: Icterus
- Species: I. cayanensis
- Subspecies: I. c. chrysocephalus

Trinomial name
- Icterus cayanensis chrysocephalus (Linnaeus, 1766)

Synonyms
- Icterus chrysocephalus (Linnaeus, 1766)

= Moriche oriole =

Subspecies of bird

The moriche oriole (Icterus cayanensis chrysocephalus) is a passerine bird in the New World family Icteridae. It is unrelated to Old World orioles (family Oriolidae). It is a breeding resident in the tropics of eastern South America. This bird is noted for its close association with the palm Mauritia flexuosa (moriche, buriti, ita, ité, etc.).

This ecologically distinct bird was formerly treated as a species Icterus chrysocephalus. It was eventually found to be embedded in the epaulet oriole (I. cayanensis) clade. Thus, for example the AOU, since 2005, has lumped the moriche oriole into I. cayanensis. The subspecific structure of I. cayanensis is still rather puzzling.

This is a slim bird, 8.7 inches (22 cm) long and weighing 1.5 oz (43 g), with a long tail and thin decurved bill. It has mainly black plumage, apart from a bright yellow crown, rump, thighs and wing epaulets. The sexes are similar, but the juvenile bird is dark brown rather than black, with duller yellow patches.

The song of the moriche oriole is a squeaky whistling heaaa-wheeooo-heaaa. This is an often-conspicuous species near its favored tree, and usually occurs singly or in pairs.

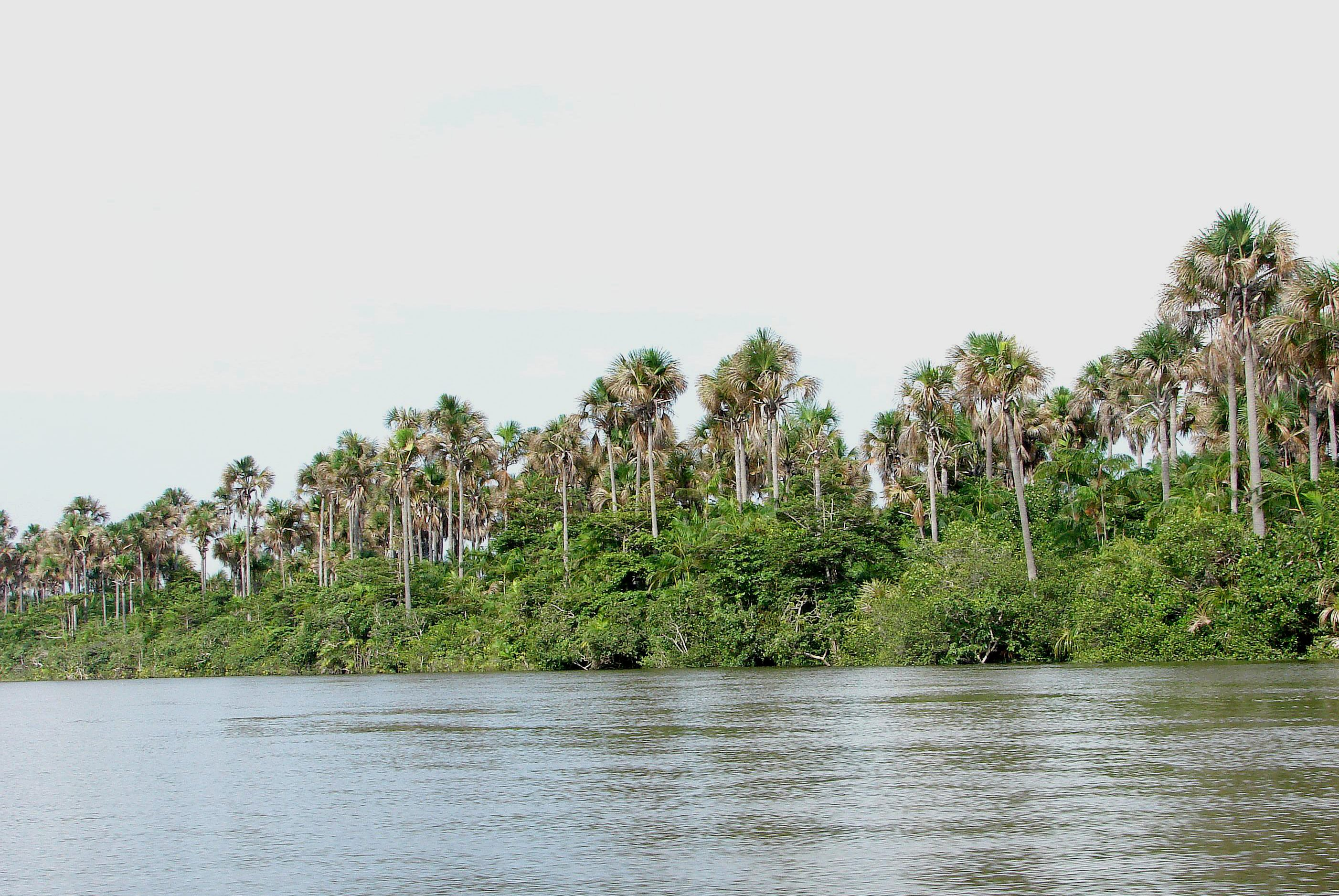
Moriche palm forest on the Preguiça River, Maranhão (Brazil)

The mochique oriole breeds from eastern Colombia, Venezuela, Trinidad and the Guianas, and south to eastern Ecuador, Paraguay and northern Brazil. The Trinidadian population may have originated from recent colonization or escapes. It is most common from sea level up to 1,600 ft (490 m) ASL, but here and there it reaches up to around 3,300 ft (1,000 m) in the eastern foothills of the Andes, which mark the western border or its range.

The moriche oriole is a bird closely associated with moriche palms (Mauritia flexuosa), and it is found in the forests, swamps or savannah where that tree occurs. This bird eats mainly insects, but will also take nectar and some fruit. Its nest is a long hanging basket of grass and other plant fibers, suspended from the end of a moriche palm branch. The normal clutch is two dark-spotted pale blue or white eggs.

It is affected to some extent by trapping for the cagebird trade, but can cope with heavy disturbance to its habitat as long as some moriche palms remain.
