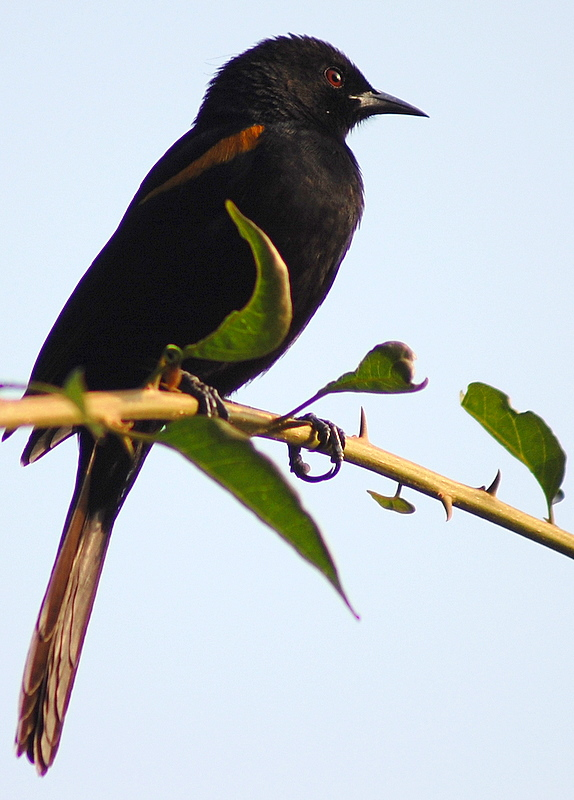

Conservation status
- Least Concern (IUCN 3.1)

Scientific classification
- Kingdom: Animalia
- Phylum: Chordata
- Class: Aves
- Order: Passeriformes
- Family: Icteridae
- Genus: Icterus
- Species: I. pyrrhopterus

Binomial name
- Icterus pyrrhopterus (Vieillot, 1819)

Synonyms
- Icterus cayanensis pyrrhopterus

= Variable oriole =

Species of bird

The variable oriole (Icterus pyrrhopterus) is a species of bird in the family Icteridae, the oropendolas, New World orioles, and New World blackbirds. It is found in Argentina, Bolivia, Brazil, Paraguay, and Uruguay and as a vagrant to Chile.

== Taxonomy and systematics ==
The variable oriole was formally described in 1819 with the binomial Agelaius pyrrhopterus. It and its subspecies were long treated as the "pyrrhopterus group" within the epaulet oriole (Icterus cayanensis sensu lato). It was returned to full species status beginning in 2010.

The variable oriole has these four subspecies:

- I. p. periporphyrus (Bonaparte, 1850)
- I. p. pyrrhopterus (Vieillot, 1819)
- I. p. tibialis Swainson, 1838
- I. p. valenciobuenoi Ihering, HFA, 1902

Some authors include subspecies I. p. valenciobuenoi within either I. p. pyrrhopterus or I. p. tibialis. Subspecies I. p. periporphyrus has also been treated as part of I. p. pyrrhopterus. In addition, some authors have suggested that I. p. tibialis should be treated as a full species. The Clements taxonomy recognizes the distinctiveness of I. p. tibialis within the species, calling it the "variable oriole (yellow-shouldered)" and grouping the other three subspecies as the "variable oriole (chestnut-shouldered)".

== Description ==
The variable oriole is about 20 cm (7.9 in) long. Males weigh an average of about 33 g (1.2 oz) and females an average of 30 g (1.1 oz). The sexes have the same plumage. Adults of the nominate subspecies I. p. pyrrhopterus are almost entirely black. They have dark chestnut lesser and median wing coverts that show as an epaulet on the closed wing and a pale gray underwing. Subspecies I. p. periporphyrus has a larger and paler chestnut epaulet than the nominate. I. p. valenciobuenoi is similar to the nominate but has a variable tawny to yellow epaulet. I. p. tibialis has a yellow epaulet and yellow thigh feathers. All subspecies have a reddish tawny to dark red-brown iris, a slender, straight, blackish bill, and leaden gray to blackish legs and feet. Juveniles are more dusky than pure black and have paler epaulets than adults.

== Distribution and habitat ==
Subspecies I. p. tibialis is the most northerly of the four. It is found in eastern Brazil from Maranhão and Ceará south to Rio de Janeiro state. Subspecies I. p. valenciobuenoi is found in southeastern Brazil from Goiás and Minas Gerais south to Santa Catarina. I. p. periporphyrus is found from Beni and Cochabamba departments in east-central Bolivia east into west-central Brazil's Mato Grosso. The nominate I. p. pyrrhopterus is found from southeastern Bolivia east through Paraguay into southern Brazil's Mato Grosso do Sul and Rio Grande do Sul, south through Uruguay, and south in Argentina roughly to a line from San Juan Province to northern Buenos Aires Province. The South American Classification Committee also has documented records of the species in Chile.

The variable oriole inhabits a wide variety of landscapes, most of which are somewhat open. They include clearings and edges of forest, gallery forest, palm savanna, Gran Chaco and humid Chaco woodlands, caatinga woodlands, parks, and gardens. In Brazil it ranges from sea level to 900 m (3,000 ft). It reaches 2,500 m (8,200 ft) in Bolivia though is rare at that elevation.

== Behavior ==
=== Movement ===
The variable oriole is not a migrant but does make local movements to find trees in flower or fruit.

=== Feeding ===
The variable oriole feeds on insects, other arthropods, fruit, nectar, and flowers. It almost always forages in trees and often hangs upside-down to reach food. During the breeding season it forages mainly in pairs and family groups; in the non-breeding season it may feed in flocks of up to 30 individuals. In the latter season it also often joins mixed-species feeding flocks.

=== Breeding ===
The variable oriole's breeding season has not been fully established but spans October to January in Argentina. It is a solitary breeder and is thought to be monogamous. Its nest is a shallow basket woven from thin plant fibers with horsehair sometimes included. It usually is fastened to the underside of a palm frond or large leaf. Nests have also been found in ornamental potted plants, in clumps of mistletoe (Loranthaceae) and epiphytic Tillandsia, and in abandoned nests of other birds. The clutch is three to four eggs that are white to pale bluish gray with darker markings. The female incubates for about 14 days and fledging occurs 14 to 15 days after hatch. Both parents provision nestlings and defend the nest. The shiny cowbird (Molothrus bonariensis) is a significant brood parasite.

=== Vocalization ===
The variable oriole's song is "rather fast, variable, pleasant, but not too musical". One call is "a sharp keet". It also imitates the vocalizations of many other birds.

== Status ==
The IUCN has assessed the variable oriole as being of Least Concern. It has a very large range; its population size is not known but is believed to be stable. No immediate threats have been identified.
