= Eternal Father =

Eternal Father may refer to:

- God the Father, a title given to God in Christianity
- "Eternal Father, Strong to Save", a British hymn
