= Trindade, Goiás =

Trindade
- Municipality
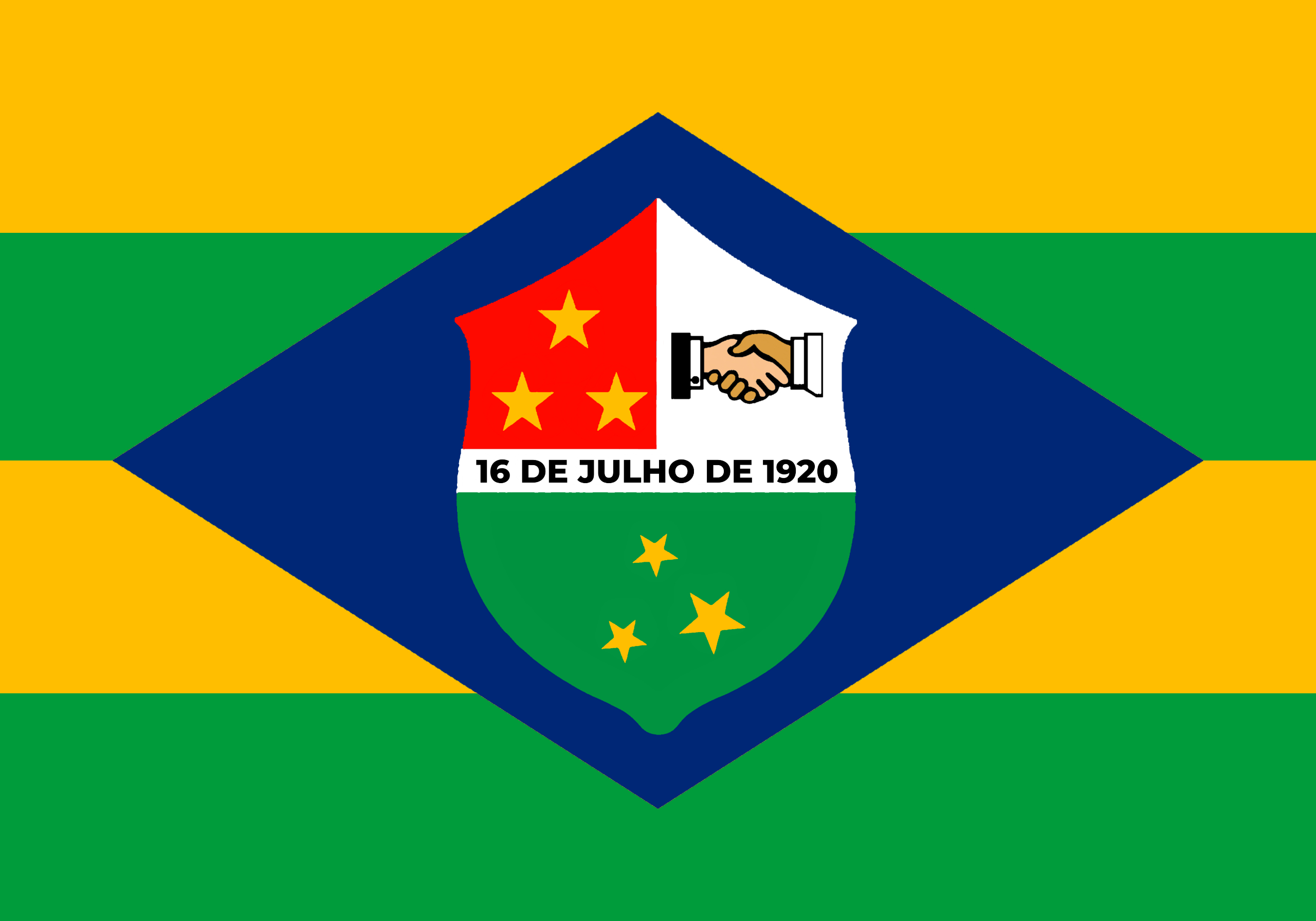
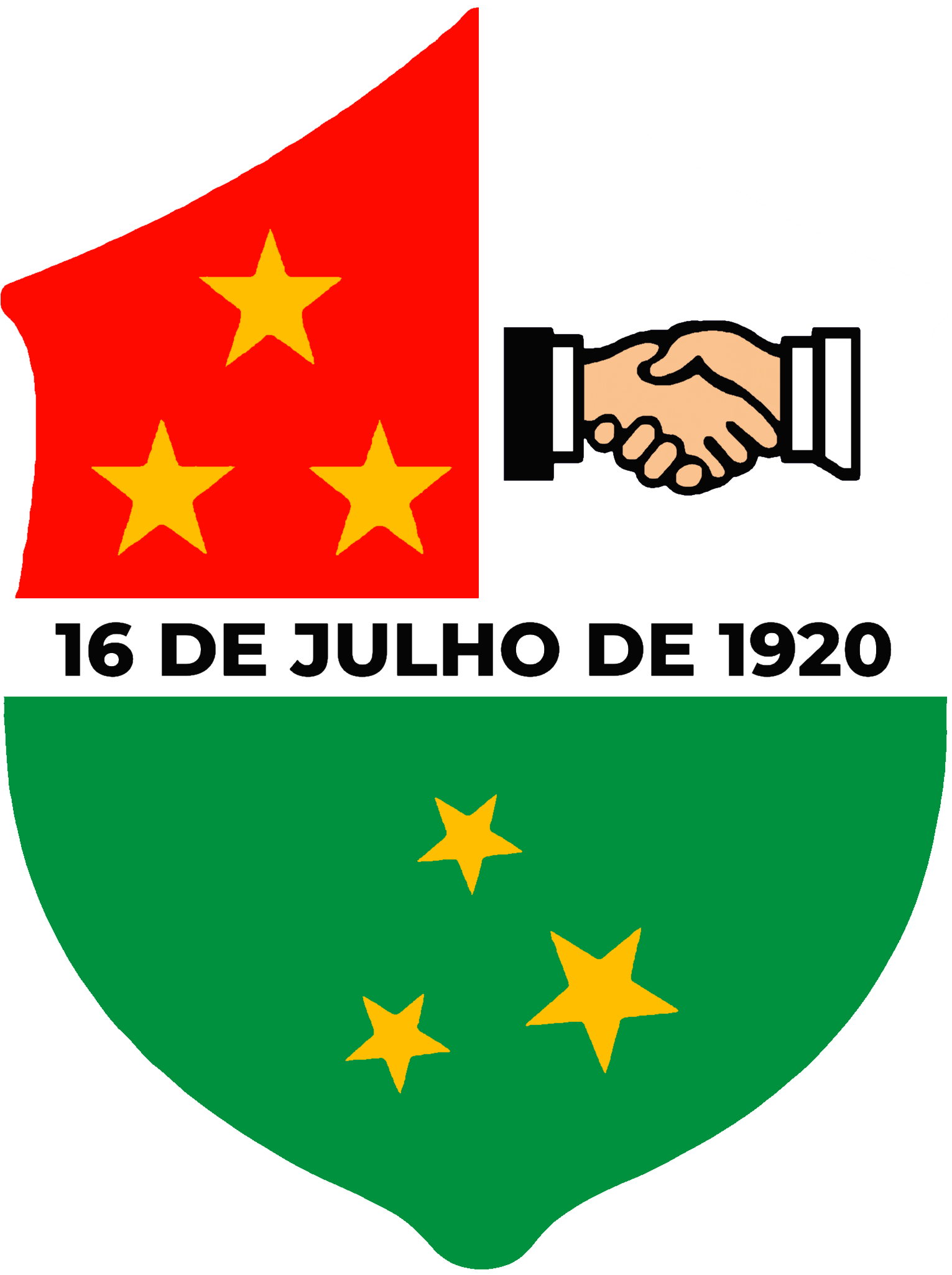
- Flag Coat of arms

- Location in Goiás state

- Location in Brazil
- Coordinates: 16°38′57″S 49°29′42″W
- Country: Brazil
- Region: Central-West
- State: Goiás
- Microregion: Goiânia Microregion

Area
  - Total: 713.2 km^{2} (275.4 sq mi)
- Elevation: 756 m (2,480 ft)

Population (2022 Census)
  - Total: 141,385
  - Estimate (2025): 155,307
  - Density: 198.2/km^{2} (513.4/sq mi)
- Time zone: UTC−3 (BRT)
- Postal code: 75380-000
- Website: www.trindade.go.gov.br

Trindade (Portuguese: [tɾĩˈdadʒi]) is a city and municipality in Goiás state, Brazil. It is famous for the religious celebrations held there in July and is now the third most important pilgrimage site in Brazil.

On the west side of the city is a purpose-built raceway where, in 2014, the city hosted a MotoCross World Championship, Grand Prix race.

Trindade is part of the Goiânia Microregion, which has over one million six hundred thousand inhabitants. It is located approximately 30 km. west of Goiânia, to which it is connected by a four-lane highway, GO-060.

== Origin of the City ==
Although Trindade became a city in 1943, its origins go back to 1840, when, according to local folklore, in a small village called Barro Preto, Constantino Xavier and his wife Ana Rosa found in their fields a small clay medallion showing the Holy Trinity crowning the Virgin Mary.

Soon a palm covered chapel was raised to be later replaced by a mortar chapel covered with tiles. Lands were donated by local farmers and a religious shrine began to take form.

Followers decided to embellish the simple clay medallion and it was taken to Pirenópolis to be worked on by the greatest artist of the region. The original clay medallion returned to Trindade substituted by a wooden representation and that is what is seen by pilgrims today in the main church.

Today this statue is displayed in the Basilica of the Eternal Father, the only basilica in the world dedicated to God the father in the Catholic trinity.

== Pilgrimage ==
Every year starting on the first Sunday of July thousands of pilgrims arrive in Trindade to pray to the "Divino Pai Eterno" (Divine Holy Father). The festival lasts for fifteen days and attracts an estimated population of close to one million visitors, one of the largest religious festivals in Brazil.

From Goiânia to Trindade the distance is 18 kilometers and the road is called a Rodovia dos Romeiros (The highway of the Pilgrims). It is lined with outdoors lit up by spotlights showing the stages of the cross, the Via Sacra, painted by a local artist Omar Souto. The artist incorporated contemporary events into the pictures, for example, Leide das Neves, victim of the accident with Cesio 137 in Goiânia in 1987.

The highlight of the celebration is a procession of several hundred "carros de boi" (ox carts), from all parts of the state. In 2003 alone 230 ox carts made their way through the streets of the town accompanied by almost two thousand riders. Close to one hundred thousand people witness the parade, perhaps the largest parade of ox carts in the world. See City of Trindade for photos.

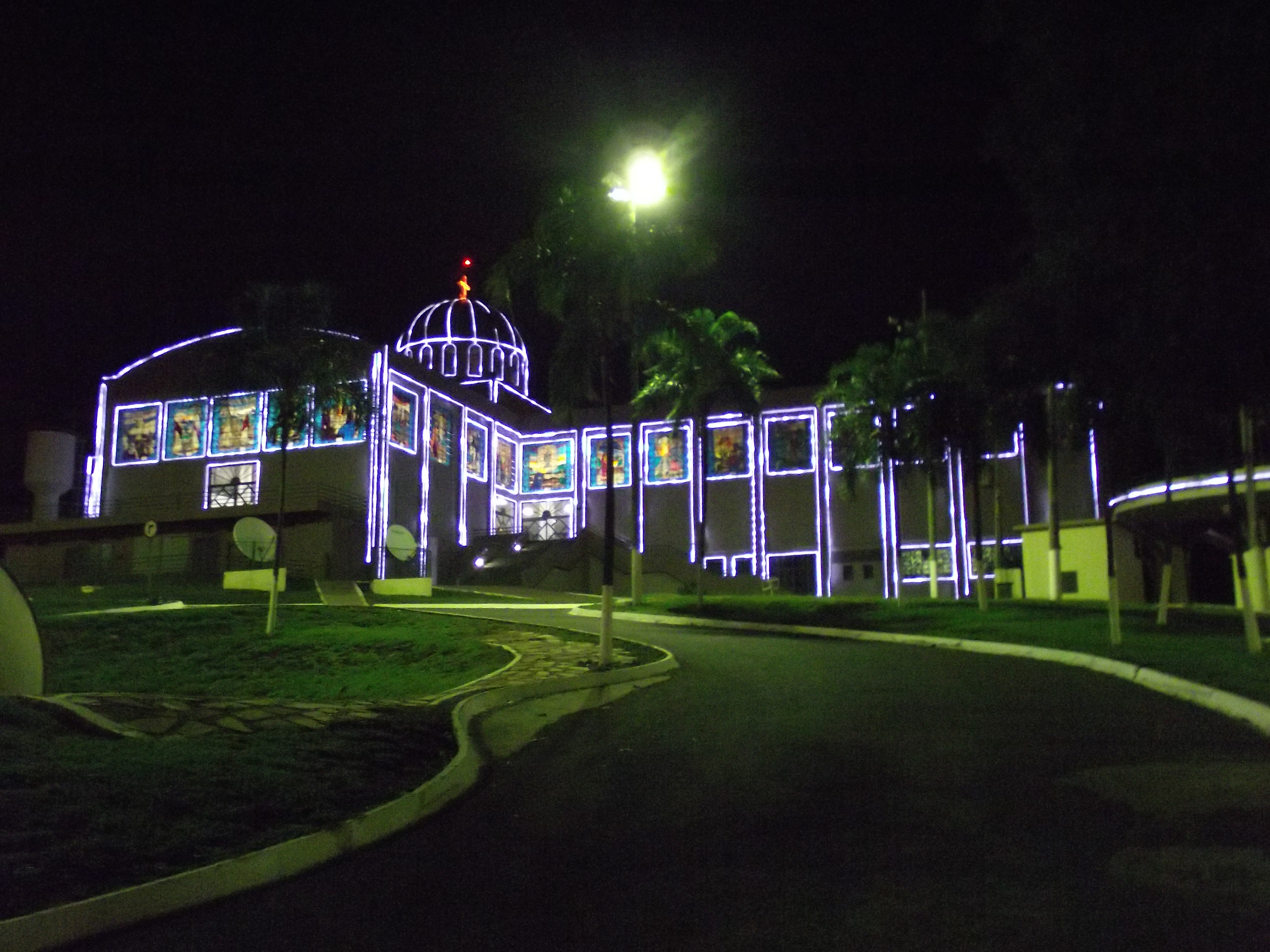
Basilica of Trindade at Christmas

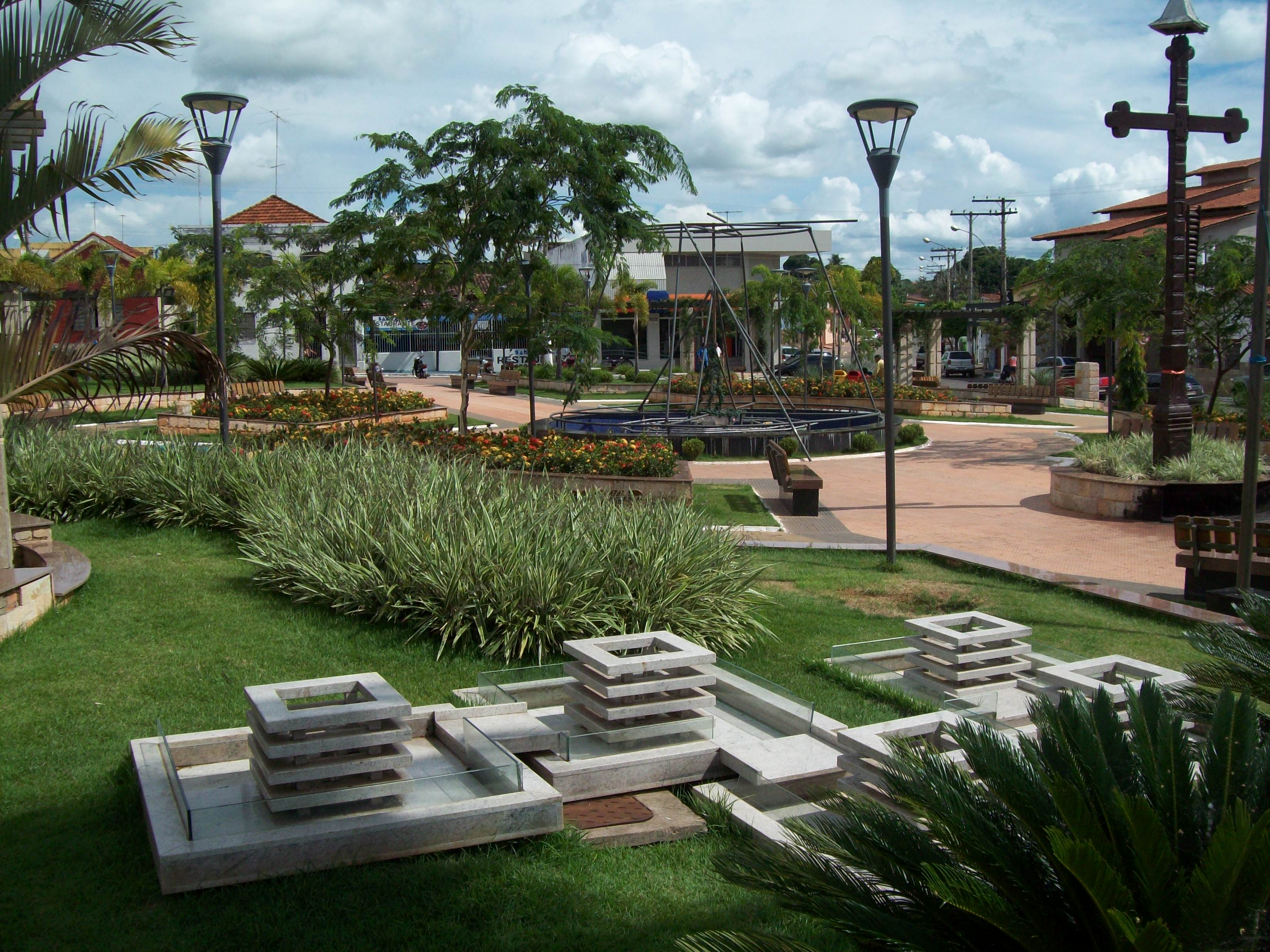
Square of Trindade

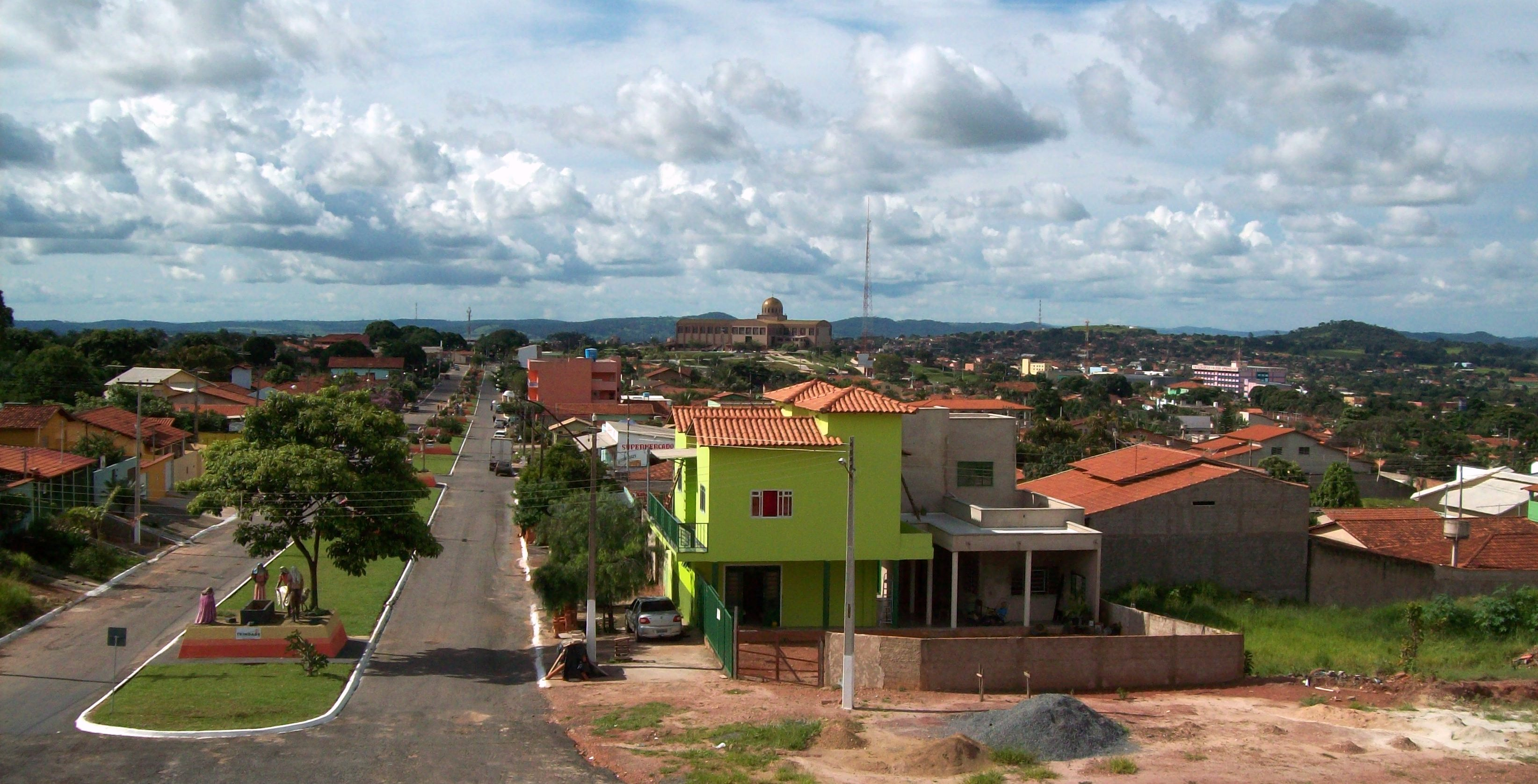
Trindade (Goiás)

== Political information ==
In September 2020 the mayor was Jânio Carlos Alves Freire. There were 35 members on the city council and the number of eligible voters was 81,150 in September 2020.

== Demography ==
The population density was 170,72 inhabitants/km^{2} in 2016. The population has increased by almost 70,000 since 1980. The majority of the inhabitants lived in the urban area—94,515 in 2007 while there were 2,976 people living in the rural area.

== Economy ==
In addition to the tourists and pilgrims who flock to Trindade to pray to the Holy Trinity, Trindade is becoming an industrial center. Today there are approximately 150 industries producing ceramic, aluminum byproducts, paint, soft drinks, and clothes, and leather. The biggest employers in the town are Refrescos Bandeirantes (Coca-Cola) and Indústria e Comércio de Bebidas Taguatinga S/A (Grupo Imperial/Antarctica).

In 2006 there was 1 meat-packing plant, 2 dairies, and 4 financial institutions.

Despite the proximity to Goiânia and the rapid industrialization, Trindade still has a substantial cattle herd with 78,000 head in 2006, of which 25,000 were milking cows. There were also 11,000 pigs and 64,000 poultry.

Trindade is also a big producer of fruits, especially citrus fruits, bananas, and tomatoes.

The main agricultural products were bananas, coffee, coconuts, oranges, lemons, papayas, mangoes, passion fruit, tangerines, pineapple, rice (300 hectares), beans, manioc, corn (2,000 hectares), soybeans, and tomatoes.

All data are from IBGE

== Education (2006) ==
- Schools: 53
- Students: 26,120
- Higher education: Instituto Aphonsiano de Ensino Superior-IAES

- Pólo Universitário da UEG

- Adult literacy rate: 89.1% (2000) (national average was 86.4%)

== Health (2007) ==
- Hospitals: 6
- Hospital beds: 571
- Infant mortality rate: 15.72 (2000) (national average was 33.0)
- MHDI: 0.759
- State ranking: 57 (out of 242 municipalities)
- National ranking: 1,615 (out of 5,507 municipalities)

For a complete list see Frigoletto.com

== See also ==
- List of municipalities in Goiás
- Feast of the Eternal Father
