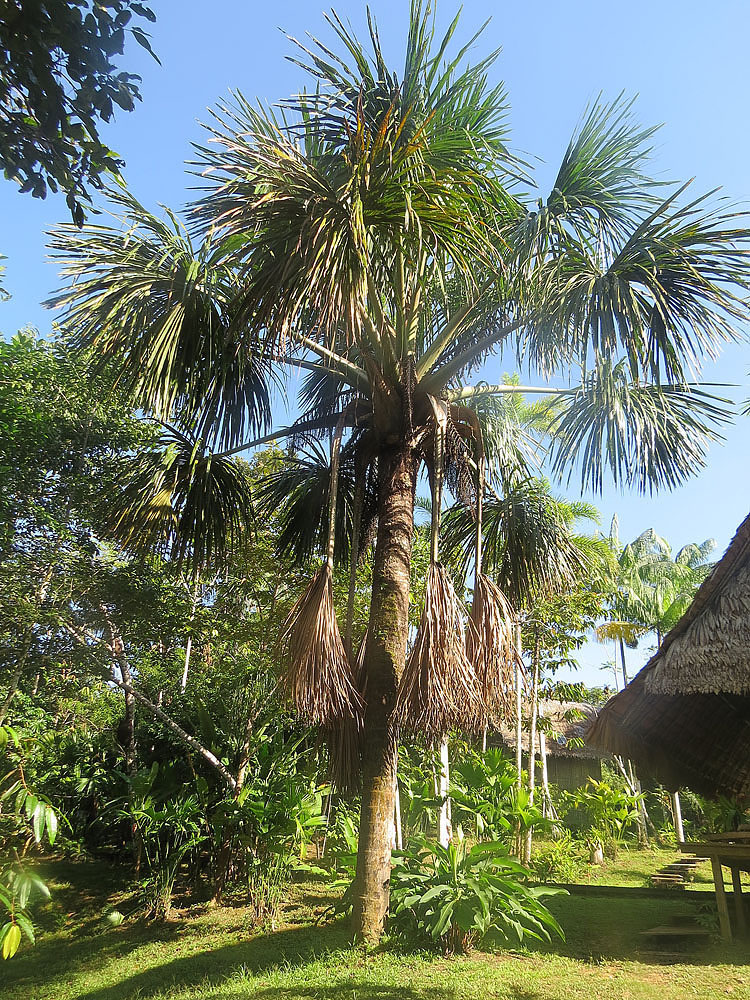

Scientific classification
- Kingdom: Plantae
- Clade: Embryophytes
- Clade: Tracheophytes
- Clade: Spermatophytes
- Clade: Angiosperms
- Clade: Monocots
- Clade: Commelinids
- Order: Arecales
- Family: Arecaceae
- Genus: Mauritia
- Species: M. flexuosa

Binomial name
- Mauritia flexuosa L.f.
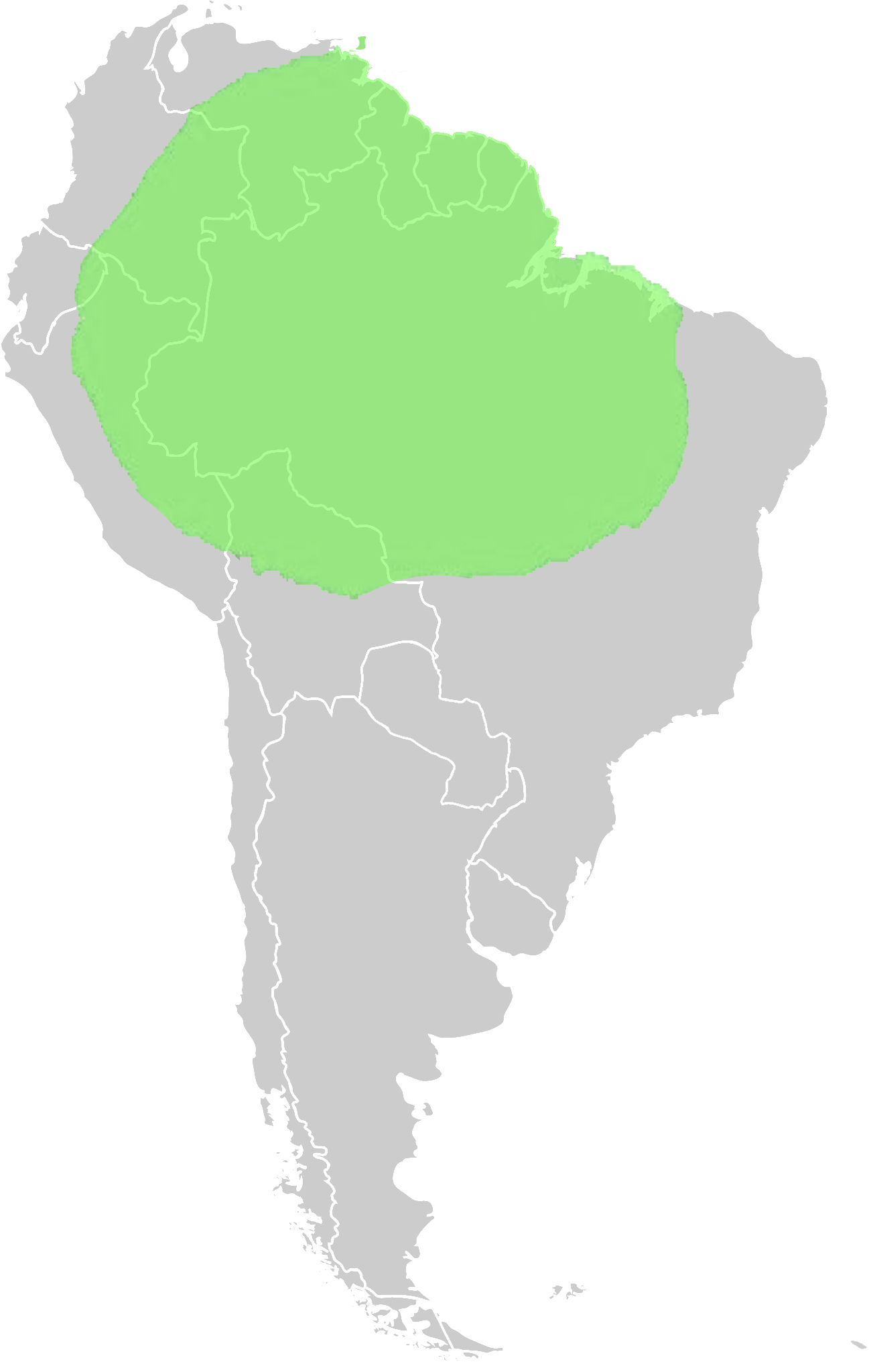
- Distribution of Mauritia flexuosa

Synonyms
- Mauritia flexuosa var. venezuelana Steyerm.; Mauritia minor Burret; Mauritia sagus Schult. & Schult.f.; Mauritia setigera Griseb. & H.Wendl.; Mauritia sphaerocarpa Burret; Mauritia vinifera Mart.; Saguerus americanus H.Wendl.

= Mauritia flexuosa =

Species of palm tree

Mauritia flexuosa, known as the moriche palm, ité palm, ita, buriti, muriti, miriti (Brazil), canangucho (Colombia), morete or acho (Ecuador), palma real (Bolivia), or aguaje (Peru), is a palm tree. It grows in and near swamps and other wet areas in tropical South America.

Mauritia flexuosa can reach up to 35 m (115 ft) in height. Henderson and McBride both give a height of 50 m (160 ft). The trunk can be up to 70 cm (28 in) diameter at breast height The large leaves form a rounded crown. The tree produces Pneumatophores which can develop as much as 30 metres (98 ft) from the trunk. suggesting a very extensive root system. The flowers are yellowish and appear from December to April. The fruit, which grows from December to June, is a chestnut color and is covered with shiny scales. The yellow flesh covers a hard, oval nut. The seeds float, and this is the means by which the palm tree propagates. In natural populations, the tree reaches very high densities.

== Distribution ==
Mauritia flexuosa is found in the wild in South America in Bolivia, Brazil, Colombia, Ecuador, French Guiana, Guyana, Peru, Suriname, Trinidad, and Venezuela.

== Fruit ==
The fruit, which is an orange-brown and covered with neat rows of scales, are consumed by catfish during the annual floods and then deposited sometimes at a considerable distance from the mother plant. When the waters recede, the seeds germinate.

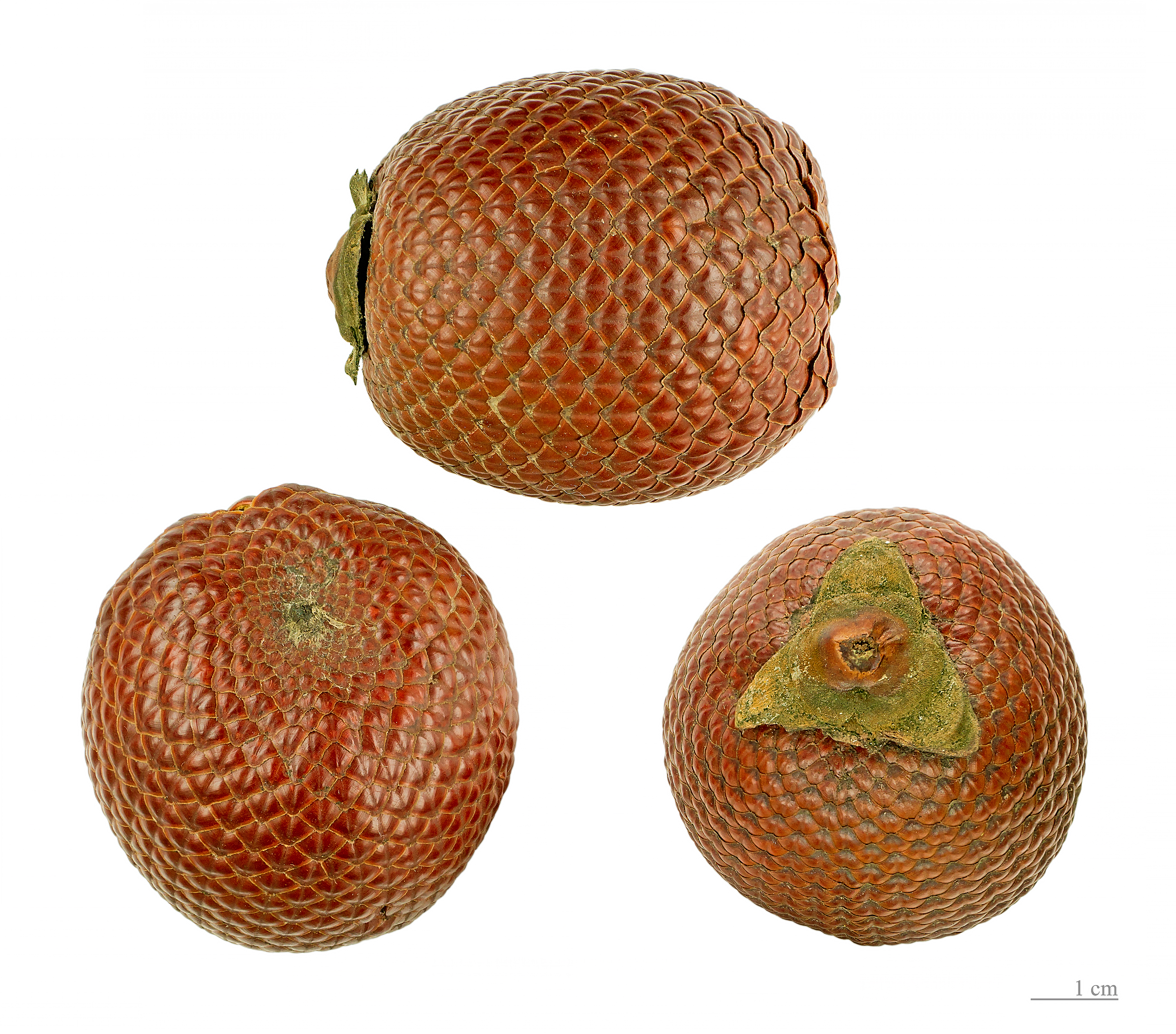
Fruits

Moriche palm fruit ("morete" in the Oriente of Ecuador) is edible and used to make juice, jam, ice cream, a fermented "wine", desserts and snacks, requiring harvesting of more than 50 tonnes per day in Peru.

The inflorescence buds are eaten as a vegetable and the sap can be drunk fresh or fermented (see palm wine). Threads and cords are locally produced from the tree's fibers.

Humans consume palm weevil larvae (Rhynchophorus palmarum) which burrow in the tree trunk.

== Oil ==
Buriti oil is an orange-reddish oil extracted from the fruit of the moriche palm. The oil contains high concentrations of oleic acid, tocopherols, and carotenoids, especially beta-carotene. The oil has a reddish color used as ink on hides and skins. Batana oil, a similar oil extract, has seen hair and skin care use since Pre-Columbian times.

== Ecology ==
This tree is important to many animal species; several bird species, such as the red-bellied macaw, sulphury flycatcher, and moriche oriole, use it for nesting and food. Tapirs, peccaries, fish and monkeys depend on the fruit.

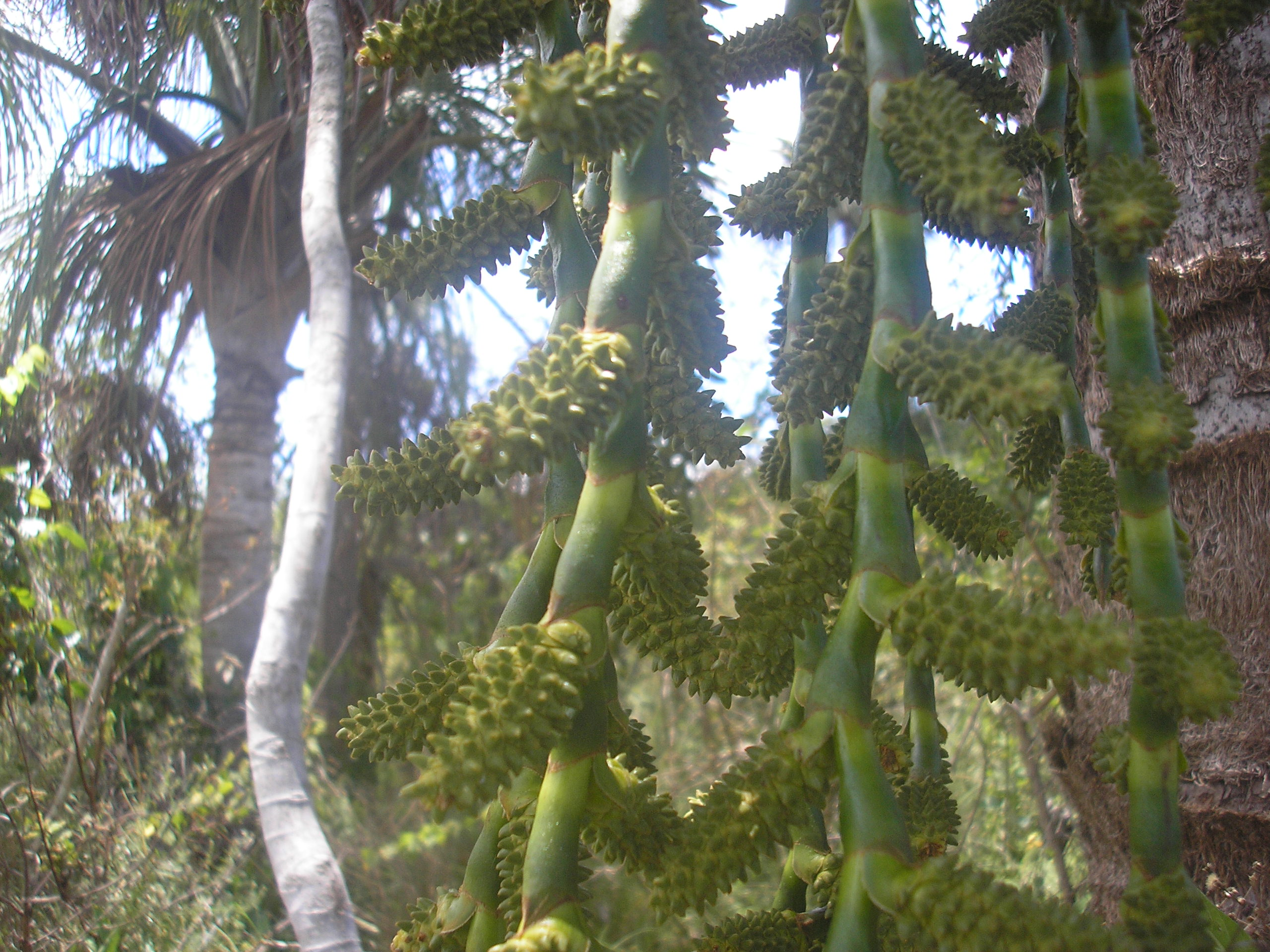
Male inflorescences.

Alexander von Humboldt documented the tree and the ecosystem it supports in 1800 when traveling through the Llanos region of Venezuela. He "observed with astonishment how many things are connected with the existence of a single plant." He called it the "tree of life" and essentially described it as a keystone species although the concept would not be explicitly defined until 1969 by Robert T. Paine.

== Miscellaneous ==
The government of the Federal District – the Brazilian state where the country's capital, Brasília, is located – is called Palácio do Buriti ("Buriti Palace"). Across the street from the building is a square with fountains and a single moriche palm tree, which was taken from the outskirts of the city and replanted there. The species is a common feature of the cerrado vegetation that predominates in central Brazil.

== See also ==
- Doce de buriti
