= History of spiritism in Brazil =

Kardecist spiritism is the main form of spiritualism in Brazil. Following the emergence of modern spiritualist events in Hydesville, New York, United States, via the mediumship of the Fox sisters (1848), the phenomena quickly spread to Europe, where in France the so-called "turning tables" became a popular fad. In 1855 in France this type of phenomenon caught the attention of the educator Hippolyte Léon Denizard Rivail. As a result of his research he published the first edition of The Spirits' Book (Paris, 1857), under the pseudonym "Allan Kardec". The foundation of the spiritist doctrine is contained in this book and four others published later: The Mediums' Book, 1861; The Gospel According to Spiritism, 1864; Heaven and Hell, 1865; The Genesis According to Spiritism, 1868. These combined books are called the "Kardecist Pentateuch".

== Background ==
In Brazil the ideas that gave rise to spiritism date back to the early experiences with the so-called "vital fluid" (animal magnetism, mesmerism) by practitioners of homeopathy, namely the physicians Benoît Jules Mure, a native of France, and João Vicente Martins, from Portugal, who arrived in the country in 1840 and applied it to their patients. Among the personalities interested in the study of the "vital fluid" were José Bonifácio de Andrada e Silva, the patriarch of Independence, also a cultivator of homeopathy, and Mariano José Pereira da Fonseca (Marquis of Maricá), who published a work with spiritualist teachings in 1844. The oldest group of these scholars and practitioners was formed in Rio de Janeiro, then the capital of the Empire of Brazil, around the figure of the physician and historian Alexandre José de Mello Moraes, and included Pedro de Araújo Lima (Marquis of Olinda), Bernardo José da Gama (Viscount of Goiana), José Cesário de Miranda Ribeiro (Viscount of Uberaba), and other prominent figures of the Second Reign.

A history of spiritism in Brazil can be divided into three major stages:

== Pioneering in Bahia ==
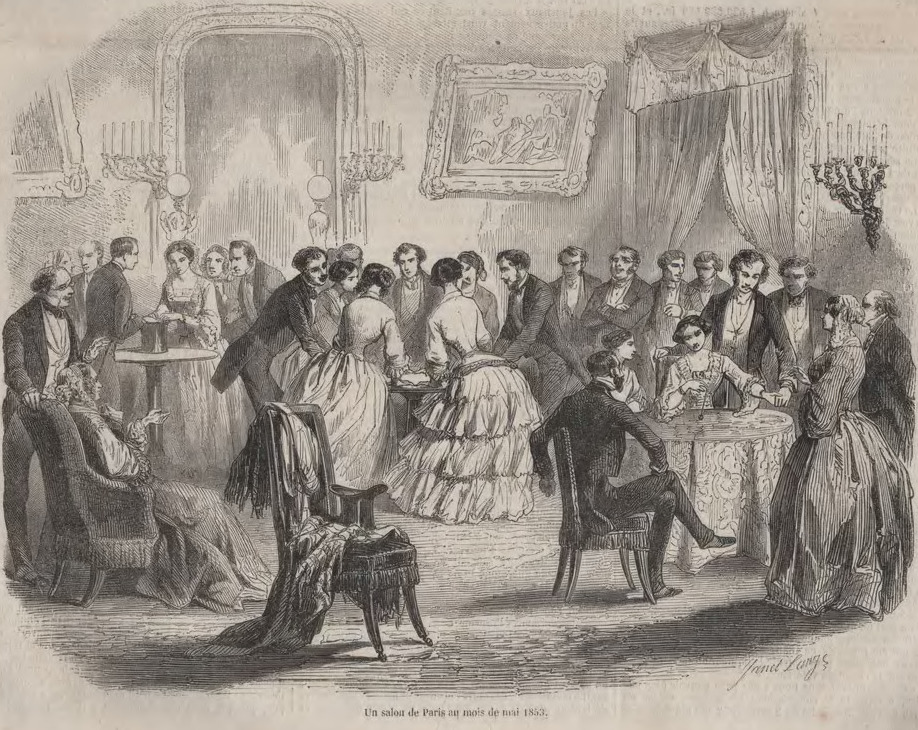
Parisian salon with people practicing three variations of turning tables with a ring, a table, and a hat. (L'Illustration, Histoire de la semaine, 14 May 1853)

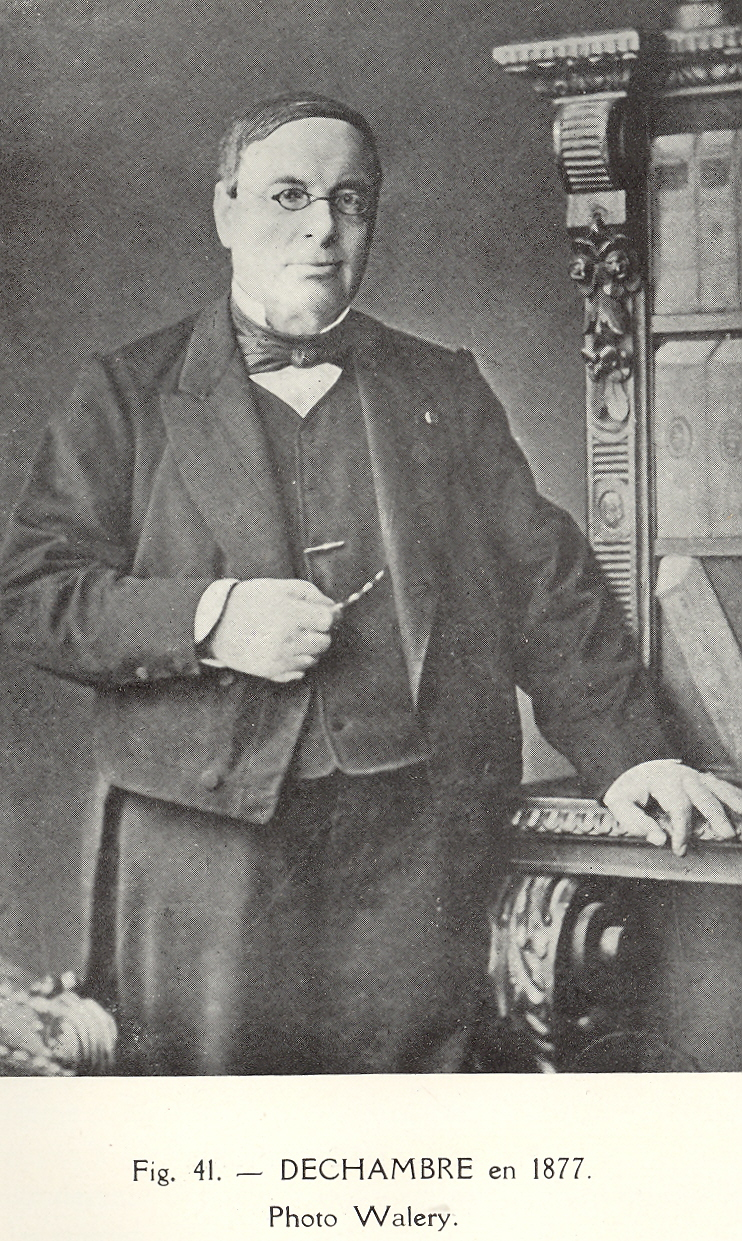

It is claimed that the history of spiritism in Brazil dates back to the year 1845 when, in the district of Mata de São João in the then Province of Bahia, the first manifestations were said to have been registered. According to Divaldo Pereira Franco, the year would have been 1849, characterized by a confrontation between elements of the Catholic Church and spiritists, with the intervention of police forces.

The phenomenon of turning tables was first reported in the country by the newspaper "O Cearense" in 1853.

In Salvador, the capital of Bahia, the Conservatório Dramático da Bahia was founded in August 1857, with the participation of personalities such as Rui Barbosa and Luís Olímpio Teles de Menezes. It was in this group that Teles de Menezes came into contact with the strange phenomena and corresponded with French spiritists.

In the pages of the Revue Spirite, under the title "Spiritism in Brazil", Kardec informed his readers that the newspaper "Diário da Bahia" in its editions of 26 and 27 September 1865, published two articles, a Portuguese translation of those that had been published six years earlier by Dr. Amédée Dechambre (1812–1886), coordinator of the publication of the "Dictionnaire encyclopédique des sciences médicales". The articles were transcriptions from the "Gazette Médicale", where the doctor made a semi-burlesque exposition of the subject, stating, for example, that the phenomenon of turning and speaking tables had already been mentioned by the Greek poet Theocritus (300–250 BC), from which he concluded that, since this phenomenon was not new, it had no basis in reality.

"We regret that Mr. Déchambre's erudition" – commented Kardec – "did not allow him to go further, because he would have found the phenomenon in ancient Egypt and India." (Op. cit., v. VIII, p. 334-335). The spiritists in Bahia immediately refuted these articles in the very "Diário da Bahia", in the edition of 28 September. The letter that preceded the refutation, addressed to the editorial office of the Bahian newspaper and signed by Teles de Menezes, José Álvarez do Amaral, and Joaquim Carneiro de Campos, suggests that the newspaper published Dr. Déchambre's work because it believed that it provided an accurate assessment of spiritist doctrine.

The refutation consisted of an extensive excerpt from the introduction of "The Spirits' Book", which led Kardec to state: "The verbatim quotations from Spiritist works are, in fact, the best refutation of the distortions that certain critics impose on the Doctrine." (Op. cit., p. 336. Apud Zêus Vantuil and Francisco Thiesen. Allan Kardec – Bibliographic Research and Interpretation Essays. Rio de Janeiro: FEB.)

This episode coincided with the foundation, in the same year (1865), in Salvador, of the Family Group of Spiritism by Teles de Menezes. It was this same individual who guided, that year, the first recorded spiritist session in the annals of Spiritism in the country, on 17 September.

The 1866 in the city of São Paulo, the Literary Typography published "Spiritism Reduced to Its Simplest Expression" by Kardec, without indicating the translator.

It was also in Bahia that the reaction of the Catholic Church began, through the pastoral letter "Against the Pernicious Errors of Spiritism", authored by the then Archbishop of the Archdiocese of São Salvador da Bahia, Manuel Joaquim da Silveira (16 June 1867).

In July 1869 in Salvador, the publication of the magazine "O Écho d'Alêm-Tumulo" began under the direction of Teles de Menezes.

In November 1873 the Brazilian Spiritist Association was founded in Salvador, a continuation of the "Family Group of Spiritism", and the following year (1874) in the same city some members of this association founded the "Santa Teresa de Jesus Group."

== Development in Rio de Janeiro ==
=== Imperial period ===
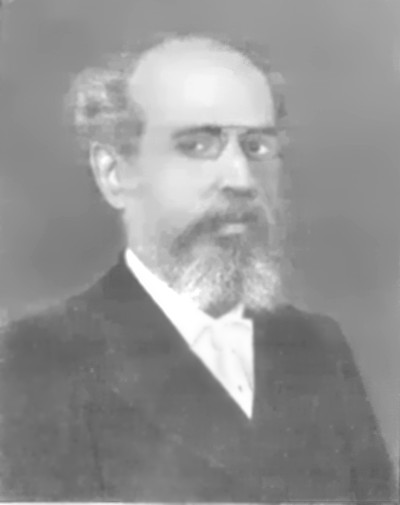
Elias da Silva, spiritist pioneer in Brazil.

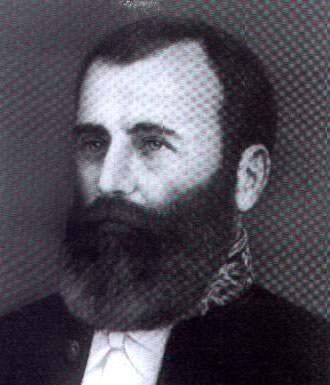
Bezerra de Menezes.

In the city of Rio de Janeiro, then capital of the Empire of Brazil, the first Spiritist sessions were held by French individuals, many of whom were political exiles from the regime of Napoleon III of France (1852–1870), in the 1860s. Some of these pioneers were the journalist Adolphe Hubert, editor of the periodical Courrier do Brésil, the professor Casimir Lieutaud, and the psychographic medium, Madame Perret Collard.

In 1860 Professor Casimir Lieutaud, founder and director of the French School in Rio de Janeiro, published a Portuguese translation of the works "The Times Are Coming" ("Les Temps sont arrivés") and "Spiritism in Its Simplest Expression" ("Le Spiritisme à sa plus simple expression").

The first newspaper to publish translated excerpts from Allan Kardec's works was the "Verdadeira Medicina Física e Espiritual associada a Cirurgia: jornal cientifico sobre as ciências ocultas e especialmente de propaganda magnetotherapia", published from January to April 1861 by Dr Eduardo Monteggia, not because he considered himself a Spiritist, but rather a democrat.

In the same period, the Jornal do Commercio, a traditional newspaper of the Brazilian capital at the time, in an article published on 23 September 1863 in the section "Chronicles of Paris," addressed the shows about spirits that were popular in the theaters of Paris and then went on to make comments about spiritism. This article is mentioned in the "Revue Spirite", where Kardec comments that the author of the article did not delve into the study of spiritism, of which he was ignorant of the theoretical aspects. But Kardec praises his sensible behavior in the face of the facts, for which he did not raise reckless theories. "At least" – Kardec referred to – "he does not judge what he does not know." And he adds:

"We verify with satisfaction that the Spiritist idea is making significant progress in Rio de Janeiro, where it has numerous fervent and devoted representatives. The small booklet "Le Spiritisme à sa plus simple expression", published in Portuguese, contributed, not insignificantly, to spreading the true principles of the Doctrine there."

In this capital the first spiritist institution to be founded was the Sociedade de Estudos Espiríticos - Grupo Confúcio (Society of Spiritist Studies – Confucius Group), in 1873. As stated in its bylaws, it was to follow the principles and formalities set forth in The Spirits' Book and The Mediums' Book, by Allan Kardec. Its activities also included free homeopathic prescriptions and the application of passes to those in need. However, its greatest virtue was promoting the translation of Kardec's basic works into the Portuguese language. The reaction in the press of the time is expressed, for example, in a comment published in the pages of the Jornal do Commercio, accusing spiritism of creating "madmen" and calling for police intervention, concluding: "It is an epidemic more dangerous than yellow fever..." (Jornal do Commercio, 13 December 1874)

In 1875 the Confúcio Group launched the second spiritist periodical in the country (the first in Rio de Janeiro), the Revista Espírita (Spiritist Review), edited by Antônio da Silva Neto.

Prominent figures associated with this group include Joaquim Carlos Travassos, who in 1875 presented the first translation of "The Spirits' Book" into the Portuguese language to Bezerra de Menezes.

The group dissolved in 1876, giving way to the Sociedade de Estudos Espíritas Deus, Cristo e Caridade (Society of Spiritist Studies God, Christ, and Charity), under the direction of Francisco Leite de Bittencourt Sampaio. Its doctrinal program, in which the work codified by Allan Kardec was an essential part, included the study of The Four Gospels by Jean-Baptiste Roustaing.

However, ideological disagreements between those advocating for a "scientific" Spiritism and others supporting a "mystical" Spiritism, led to dissensions within the Society of Studies. Initially, in 1877, a group separated to establish the Congregação Espírita Anjo Ismael (Spiritist Congregation Angel Ismael) (20 May). The following year (1878), another group formed the Grupo Espírita Caridade (Charity Spiritist Group) (8 June). Both had short durations and had disappeared by 1879. In the same year, the Society of Studies gave way to the Sociedade Acadêmica Deus, Cristo e Caridade (Academic Society God, Christ, and Charity) (3 October 1879), following the orientation of the "scientific" group, which opposed the religious character of the Doctrine. Consequently, a final group, under the leadership of medium João Gonçalves do Nascimento, inspired by the spirit Ismael, formed a new organization called the Grupo Espírita Fraternidade (Fraternity Spiritist Group) (1880).

Still in this context, Antônio Luís Sayão, who unsuccessfully attempted to reconcile the "Academic Society God, Christ, and Charity" with the "Fraternity Spiritist Group," founded, together with Frederico Pereira Júnior, João Gonçalves do Nascimento, Francisco Leite de Bittencourt Sampaio, and others, the so-called "Grupo dos Humildes" (Group of the Humble), popularly known as the "Sayão Group" (15 July 1880). This group, in its first phase, which lasted about a year, held productive meetings. Later, the group came to be called the "Ismael Group" and integrated into the Federação Espírita Brasileira (Brazilian Spiritist Federation), where it exists to this day.

Also in 1880, Augusto Elias da Silva, the future founder of the Reformador and the Federação Espírita Brasileira (Brazilian Spiritist Federation), founded the União dos Espíritas do Brasil (Union of Brazilian Spiritists), of which he presided over.

Regarding this turbulent period, researcher Pedro Richard stated:

"At that time, a significant event occurred: Spiritists, either due to disagreement of ideas or criminal pretension, created a considerable number of groups, whose members, for the most part, were unaware of the most rudimentary precepts of the Doctrine. Any Spiritist would form a group, solely to satisfy their vanity by giving it a name they revered. Only a few groups were productive, but they were too few in number."

The following year (1881), as an offshoot of the "Fraternity Group," the Grupo Espírita Humildade e Fraternidade (Humility and Fraternity Spiritist Group) was founded, with the support of Francisco Raimundo Ewerton Quadros, who would later become one of the founders of the FEB and its first president (7 June). However, the year was marked by the beginning of official persecution of spiritism (28 August). The Rio de Janeiro newspapers O Cruzeiro and Jornal do Commercio announced in their pages, in an exclusive report, the police order that banned the activities of the "Academic Society God, Christ, and Charity" and its affiliated centers, making spiritists who contradicted the police provisions subject to criminal sanctions. On the same day, the Society held an extraordinary session to take defensive measures if the news were confirmed. Still on the same day, the Board of the Academic Society appeared before the Minister of Justice, who received them warmly, stating that there must have been some misunderstanding and that he would not allow the persecution of anyone.

However, on 30 August, a judicial officer presented the Society with a copy of the summons from the 2nd Police Delegate of the Municipality of the Court, a summons that suspended and prohibited the meetings of the said Society, alleging that it was not legally constituted. Immediately, the Board of the Academic Society sent letters to the Chief of Police and the Minister of Justice, Counselor Manuel Pinto de Souza Dantas, demonstrating the arbitrariness of that measure. A committee, composed of Dr. Antônio Pinheiro Guedes, Carlos Joaquim de Lima e Cirne, and Dr. Joaquim Carlos Travassos, contacted the Chief of Police, who, despite receiving them amiably, resolved nothing, suggesting that the order came from a higher authority.

In this context, on 6 September 1881, the first Spiritist Congress in Brazil took place, promoted by the Academic Society. On the same day, a committee of spiritists was received by Emperor Pedro II of Brazil, to whom they handed a document with a detailed exposition of the facts and a request for justice to be served. The Emperor, on that occasion, is also said to have stated: "I do not consent to persecution." Two weeks later, on the 21st, the same committee returned to the palace to learn of the response to the considerations expressed in the exposition delivered to the Emperor. He stated that he had sent the papers to the Minister of the Empire to resolve the case and once again affirmed, with a touch of humor, "No one will persecute them. But... they shouldn't try to be martyrs now."

Although the police order was never officially revoked, it also did not proceed. Finally, in an official letter dated 10 January 1882, addressed to H.M. D. Pedro de Alcântara, Emperor of Brazil, the Board of the Academic Society expressed its jubilation "for the beginning of tolerance" towards that Society, "a clear sign that the persecutions initiated against Spiritism and Spiritists have ended".

This first police action against spiritism resulted in the foundation, in Rio de Janeiro, in September or October 1881, of the Grupo Espírita Vinte e Oito de Agosto (Twenty-Eighth of August Spiritist Group), a date that the spiritists of that time wanted to preserve for posterity.

As a result of the Spiritist Congress, on 3 October of the same year, the Centro da União Espírita do Brasil (Center of the Spiritist Union of Brazil) was founded within the "Academic Society," by Professor Afonso Angeli Torteroli. The new institution aimed to bring together and guide Spiritist societies at the national level. Among its members was the name of Lima e Cirne. This Society launched a magazine in January 1881, the second Spiritist periodical in Rio de Janeiro, with Major Ewerton Castro as one of its contributors.

To mark the first anniversary of the news about the repression of Spiritists, the I Espírita Exposition of Brazil was opened on 28 August 1882, at the headquarters of the Academic Society, at 120 Rua da Alfândega. The commemorative program, organized by the Society itself, was entitled "Celebration of Spiritism in Brazil" and extended until 3 September. Visitors had the opportunity to appreciate various mediumistic works, such as psychographic writings in normal characters, shorthand and telegraphy in foreign languages (including Oriental languages), psychopictography, copies of correspondence between the Academic Society and foreign spiritist associations, spiritist newspapers and magazines from Europe and America, various Spiritist works, portraits of notable figures of Spiritism from various countries, as well as books and newspapers opposing the Doctrine. On this occasion the newspaper "O Renovador" (The Renewer) was also launched by Major Salustiano José Monteiro de Barros and Professor Afonso Angeli Torteroli. A few months later, the "Reformador" (The Reformer) would be published, under the direction of Augusto Elias da Silva (21 January 1883). The idea of publishing the latter was influenced by a pastoral letter opposing spiritism, published in 1882 by the Bishop of Rio de Janeiro, which prompted responses from the physician Antônio Pinheiro Guedes.

It was Elias da Silva who, at the end of that year (27 December 1883), held a preparatory meeting for the reorganization of the movement in the Municipality of the Court at his own residence, given the apparent lack of understanding among the members of the various existing spiritist entities there: the "Centro da União Espírita do Brasil," the "Grupo dos Humildes," the "Grupo Espírita Fraternidade," and the "Sociedade Acadêmica Deus, Cristo e Caridade." As a result of this understanding, the Federação Espírita Brasileira (Brazilian Spiritist Federation) was founded on 1 January 1884, considered as the "House of Ismael," with the aim of federating all groups through a "balanced or mixed program" and disseminating Spiritism through all means, especially the press and books.

On 17 August 1885, in a room on Rua da Alfândega, FEB inaugurated a cycle of public conferences that became prominent, with speakers including Elias da Silva, Bittencourt Sampaio, and other pioneers of spiritism in the country. The increase in the public's attendance led these lectures to be moved to Salão da Guarda Velha (in the street of the same name, currently Av. 13 de Maio), where, on 16 August 1886, Dr. Adolfo Bezerra de Menezes publicly proclaimed his Spiritist convictions before an audience of over a thousand people (1,500 or two thousand, according to sources).

In 1887, Elias da Silva founded the Grupo Espírita Sete de Março (Seventh of March Spiritist Group), which remained active until 1890.

During the tumultuous days that stretched from the Abolition of Slavery in Brazil (1888) to the proclamation of the Republic (1889), the following stand out:

- a series of articles on the spiritist doctrine published in O Paiz, the most widely circulated periodical of the time. (Note: According to Spiritist historian Silvino Canuto de Abreu. The header of the newspaper, directed by Quintino Bocaiuva, claimed to be the newspaper with the highest circulation in South America.) Under the name "Estudos Filosóficos – Espiritismo" (Philosophical Studies – Spiritism), the articles were regularly published on Sundays from 23 October 1887, to December 1893, signed under the pseudonym "Max."
- the message of the spirit of Allan Kardec in the "Grupo Espírita Fraternidade," calling on spiritists to seek harmony (1888); and
- the decision of Bezerra de Menezes, who, after preaching the need for greater understanding among spiritists through articles and advice, finally accepted the position of director of FEB, succeeding Ewerton Quadros, who had managed it from 1884 to 1888 and had been transferred to the then Province of Goiás due to his military duties.
- the visit of American physical medium Henry Slade (1835–1905) to Brazil.

It was at this moment that the Center of the Spiritist Union of Brazil, in its second phase, was reorganized and installed in the FEB's facilities, with Bezerra de Menezes as president and later Elias da Silva (1893). (Note: This episode is referred to by some authors as the founding of the "Centro Espírita do Brasil" (Spiritist Center of Brazil) on 21 April 1889, with Bezerra as its first president, which established the first School of Mediums along with Elias da Silva.) It was also Bezerra de Menezes who incorporated the "Grupo dos Humildes" (Group of the Humble), later renamed "Grupo Ismael" (Ismael Group), into FEB. After the proclamation of the Republic, the Grupo Espírita Fraternidade (Fraternity Spiritist Group) would also join FEB.

Prominent figures in the republican movement, such as Joaquim Saldanha Marinho (1816–1895) and Quintino Bocaiuva (1836–1912), sympathized with the Spiritist doctrine. In the literary field, noteworthy individuals include Machado de Assis (1839–1908) as a critic; Spiritist Manuel de Araújo Porto-Alegre (1806–1879), who held psychographic sessions in Paris and wrote a play ("Os Voluntários da Pátria" – "The Volunteers of the Fatherland") incorporating Spiritist elements; and sympathizers such as Castro Alves (1847–1871), who intended to write a spiritist work as the final poem of "Os Escravos" (The Slaves); Augusto dos Anjos, who conducted spiritist sessions and engaged in psychography in his hometown; Antônio Castro Lopes (1827–1901), a poet and philologist; and Alexandre José de Mello Moraes (1816–1882), a physician, historian, and politician.

Outside the Municipality of the Court, during this period, the founding of the Spiritist newspaper "A Cruz" (The Cross) in Recife stands out, established by Júlio César Leal on 6 July 1881, the first spiritist periodical in the capital of Pernambuco.

=== Republican period ===
With the Proclamation of the Republic of Brazil (15 November 1889), on 22 December, the FEB congratulates the Provisional Government for the advent of the new regime.

However, since the country still did not have a Constitution, Decree No. 847, dated 11 October 1890, promulgated the Penal Code of the Republic. This decree, inspired by positivism, associated the practice of spiritism with rituals of magic and charlatanism, as expressed in Article 157, which stated:

"It is a crime to practice Spiritism, magic, and their spells, to use talismans and cartomancy to incite feelings of hatred or love, to claim to heal curable or incurable diseases, in short, to fascinate and subjugate public credulity. Penalty: imprisonment from 1 to 6 months and a fine of 100$000 to 500$000."

Spiritists protested to Campos Sales, who was then the Minister of Justice, but without success. The rapporteur of the Penal Code, João Batista Pinheiro, limited himself to stating that the text referred to the practice of so-called "low spiritism." On 22 December 1890, Bezerra de Menezes, as the president of the "Center of the Spiritist Union of Brazil," sent an official letter to the President of the Republic, Marshal Deodoro da Fonseca, regarding the new Penal Code.

Concerned about possible pockets of resistance to the regime, the government authorized the police to raid meetings and homes in search of opponents. As a result, in 1891, in the city of Rio de Janeiro, several spiritists were detained. Persecuted and prohibited from gathering, the few existing spiritist centers found themselves forced to close their doors to avoid the penalties of the law. FEB itself was obliged to suspend the publication of its magazine, the "Reformador," at that time. However, it was in this context that Bezerra de Menezes founded the Spiritist Group Regeneration (18 February 1891), the "House of Benefits." (Note: For a history of the institution, see: Francisco Cândido Xavier. Queda e Ascensão da Casa dos Benefícios. Rio de Janeiro: Grupo Espírita Regeneração, 1991.)

In 1893, at the height of the second Revolt of the Navy, the government further hardened the regime. Spiritists submitted a new protest to the National Congress against the Penal Code, once again in vain, as the code's review committee did not meet their demands. Faced with external and internal difficulties, the Reformador ceased circulation in the last quarter of that year. The "Fraternity Spiritist Group," after changing its bylaws and renaming itself the "Psychological Fraternity Society," dissolved during the Revolt of the Navy, and on Christmas of that same year, Bezerra de Menezes concluded the series "Philosophical Studies" he had been publishing in O Paiz newspaper.

The following year (1894), with the easing of the political situation, Augusto Elias, together with Fernandes Figueira and Alfredo Pereira, launched a fundraising campaign to support FEB's projects. The Reformador resumed circulation.

Historians of the movement record that at the time, there was an ideological and doctrinal division between the so-called "lay" or "scientific" individuals, represented by Prof. Angeli Torteroli, who advocated the scientific aspect of spiritism, and the "mystics," led by Dr. Bezerra de Menezes, who advocated the religious aspect. Thus, on 4 April 1894, the "Center of Spiritist Union" changed its name to the Center of Spiritist Union for Propagation in Brazil, under the direction of Prof. Angeli Torteroli, located at 9 Silva Jardim Street. Its board of directors included names such as Júlio César Leal (Note: Who would later become the president of FEB) and Bezerra de Menezes, who resigned from it in 1896 due to a campaign of personal insults against him, as he was considered a mystic who did not bother to reason. (Note: The "mystics" would also be called "bezerrists." Bezerra, in fact, would be attacked through notes like this: "The arguments of Dr Bezerra de Menezes in favor of his spiritist orientation are nothing more than colorful soap bubbles blown by his mysticism to dazzle the ignorant simplicity of those who do not know or do not want to bother to reason." (SOARES, Sylvio Brito. Vida e Obra de Bezerra de Menezes. Rio de Janeiro: FEB 1963.))

With Júlio César Leal's resignation from the presidency of FEB, after seven months in office due to a profound administrative, financial, and ideological crisis experienced by the institution, Bezerra de Menezes accepted to assume the position once again on 3 August 1895. In the exercise of his functions, he imparted an evangelical orientation to the institution's work and remained in office until his death in 1900.

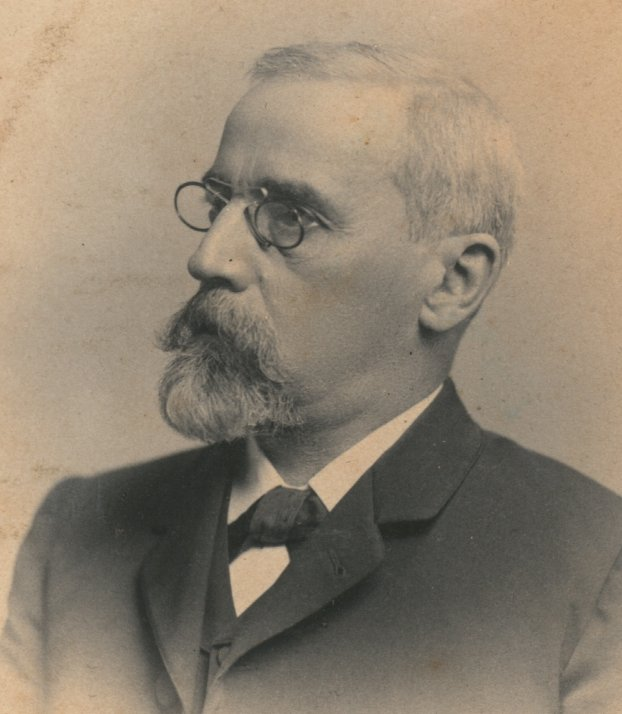
Aristides Spinola.

During this time, on 28 August 1897, the "Center of Spiritist Union for Propagation in Brazil" held the "Permanent Spiritist Congress," paying tribute to the "Academic Society God, Christ, and Charity," which had been the target of an attempted persecution against spiritists in 1881. However, the "Center" disappeared during the same period as the Congress.

By 1904, there were no less than 19 periodicals dedicated to spiritism circulating in the country.

On 15 April 1905, the headquarters of FEB, located at 97 Rosário Street in the historic center of the city, was visited by officials from the General Directorate of Public Health, who issued citations against the medium Dr Domingos de Barros Lima Filgueiras for the illegal practice of medicine. In the subsequent legal process against the then-president of FEB, Leopoldo Cirne, and the medium Domingos Filgueiras, both were acquitted.

The new headquarters of FEB, on Sacramento Street (now Avenida Passos), was inaugurated on 10 December 1911.

On 1 May 1912, the weekly spiritist newspaper Aurora was founded in the city of Rio de Janeiro by Inácio Bittencourt, who was responsible for it for over three decades. Under his presidency, the Tereza de Jesus Shelter was founded in 1919, a traditional charitable institution that has survived to this day.

The centralizing role of FEB at the national level was questioned in the 1920s with the founding of the Spiritist League of Brazil by Aurino Barbosa Souto (31 March 1926), which had a similar purpose. In response, the Federative Council of FEB met for the first time that same year.

"Jornal do Brasil" published an interview with the writer Coelho Neto (7 June 1923), who had been an uncompromising opponent of Spiritism but converted to it after participating in a conversation over the telephone between his deceased granddaughter and her mother. In the same year, he delivered a speech about his adherence to the spiritist doctrine at the Salão da Guarda Velha in Rio de Janeiro. That same year, the prescribing mediumship service of FEB reached its highest number of consultations, with nearly 400,000 people attended to.

Outside the then Federal District, notable developments during this period include:

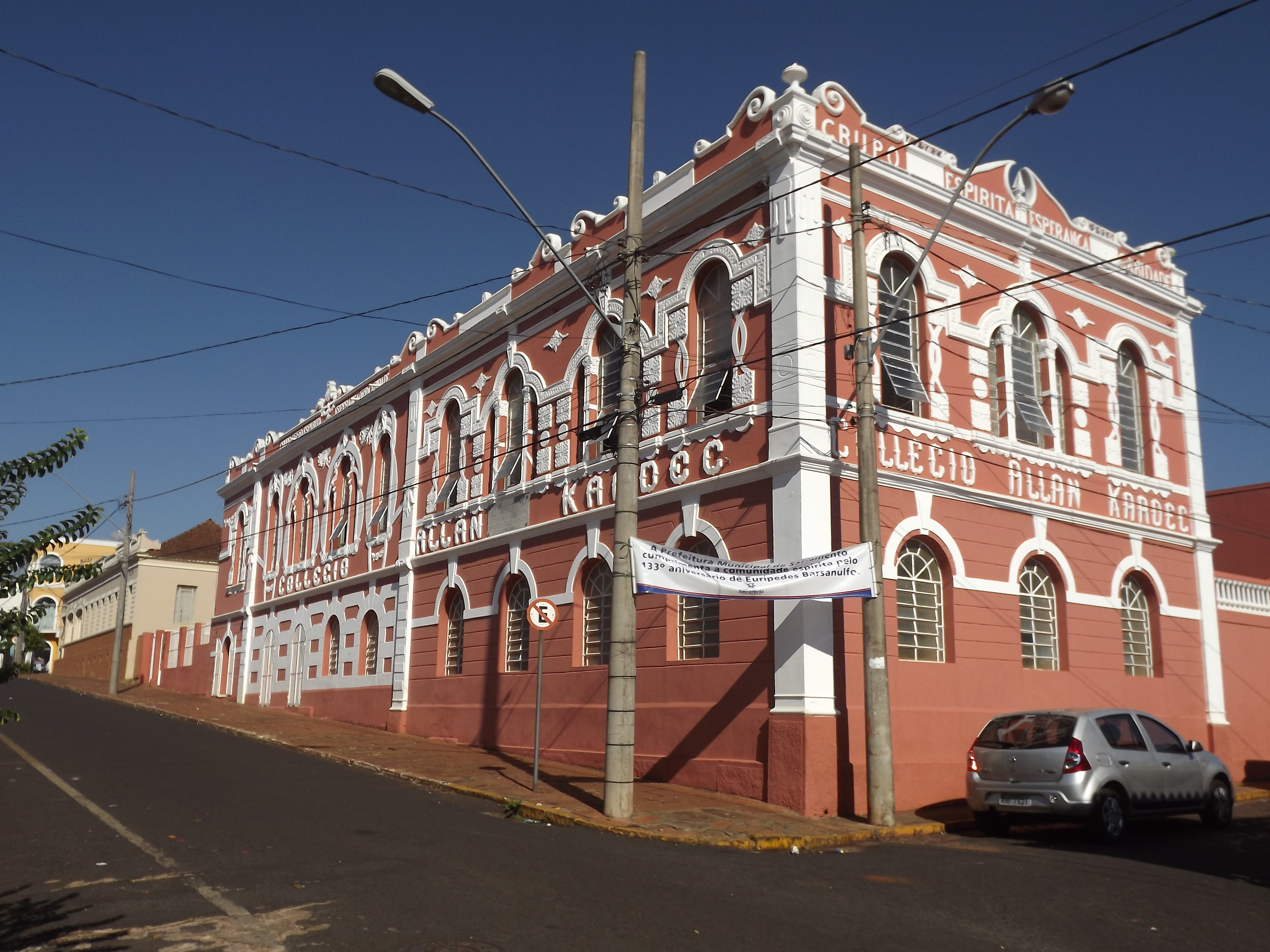
Colégio Allan Kardec, founded by Eurípedes Barsanulfo.

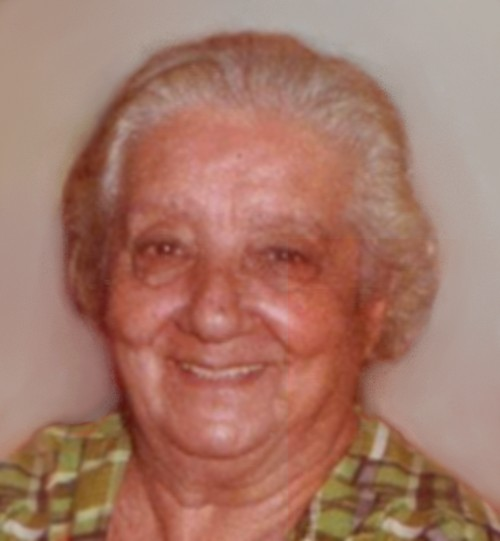
Yvonne do Amaral Pereira.

- In São Paulo, Batuíra founded the Truth and Light Spiritist Group and a periodical with the same name, composed and printed in its own typography (1890);
- In Recife, the founding of the God and Charity Association of the Afflicted Spiritists, on Futuro Street, Aflitos neighborhood, on 26 August 1894, the first spiritist society in Pernambuco.
- In Recife, the founding of the Pernambuco Spiritist Federation (8 December 1904);
- In Minas Gerais, the founding of the Minas Gerais Spiritist Union, with Antônio Lima as its first president, the beginning of the activities of Eurípedes Barsanulfo in the Triângulo Mineiro region (1904), and the start of Cairbar Schutel's spiritist advocacy, who founded a spiritist center and began publishing "O Clarim" (1905), a periodical that continues to be published to this day;
- In Minas Gerais, 1916 marked the beginning of psychography through the mediumship of Zilda Gama, receiving messages signed by the spirit of Victor Hugo;
- Also in Minas Gerais, in 1926, medium Yvonne do Amaral Pereira started attending the Spiritist Center of Lavras, where she began receiving messages from spirits of suicide victims through her mediumship. The following year (May 1927), the first spiritist session was held at the Xavier residence in Pedro Leopoldo, which led to the establishment of the Luiz Gonzaga Spiritist Center, presided over by José Cândido Xavier, brother of the medium Francisco Cândido Xavier.
- In São Paulo, the founding of the São Paulo Spiritist Union (1908), and later, during the First World War, the mediumistic phenomena of Carmine Mirabelli;
- In Salvador, Bahia, the founding of the Bahia State Spiritist Federation (25 December 1915);
- In Matão, São Paulo, the launch of the International Spiritist Review, under the direction of Cairbar Schutel (15 February 1925).
- In Goiás, the founding of a spiritist center at Palmella Farm (1929), which later became the municipality of Palmelo, known today as the "Spiritist City."

The first major dissensions within the spiritist movement occurred in the early 20th century. The first took place in Niterói, with the establishment of Umbanda, traditionally initiated by the Caboclo das Sete Encruzilhadas (1908), and the second occurred in Santos (1910) and called itself "Espiritismo Racional e Científico Cristão" (Rational and Scientific Christian Spiritism), systematized by Luís de Matos and Luís Alves Tomás.

== From Estado Novo to Pacto Áureo ==
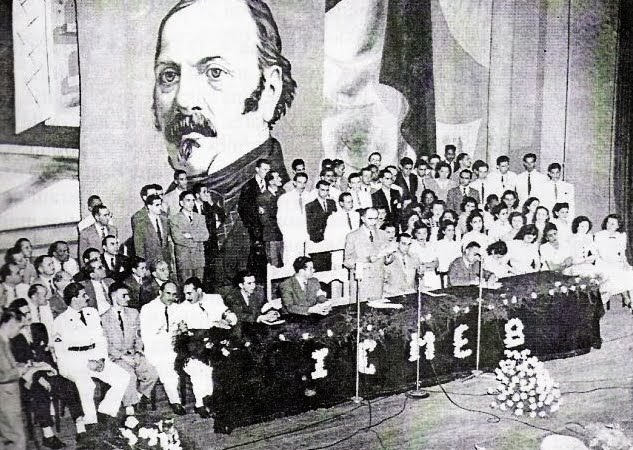
I Congresso de Mocidades Espíritas do Brasil, 1948

Since the 1920s, clashes between spiritism and psychiatry had been occurring in Brazil, which only ended around the mid-20th century due to advancements such as the research conducted between the 1950s and 1960s on mediumship in the country by French sociologist and ethnologist Roger Bastide. Bastide demonstrated the prejudices and ethnocentrism in previous studies on the subject.[1]

Henrique Roxo (1877–1969) dedicated an entire chapter to spiritism in his "Manual de Psiquiatria" (1921), reproducing the medical and Catholic discourse of the time, still marked by slavery, which attributed the belief in the country to remnants of African fetishism, observing: "One often sees what one observes in the cinema, in those dances of Negroes, with their extravagant movements, contortions, and gestures." The professionals educated at the Faculty of Medicine of Rio de Janeiro considered Spiritism as a contagious pathology capable of incapacitating large human contingents for work. For this reason, it should be repressed by the authorities and eradicated through public health campaigns:

"The fight against Spiritism must be equated with the fight against syphilis, alcoholism, psychoactive drugs (opium, cocaine, etc.), tuberculosis, leprosy, worm diseases, and, in short, all the evils that contribute to the annihilation of the vital, physical, and psychic energies of our people, of our race in formation."

— João Coelho Marques, "Espiritismo e Ideias Delirantes," Doctoral thesis presented to the Faculty of Medicine of Rio de Janeiro, 1929.

The doctoral candidate appealed to the Brazilian League of Mental Hygiene and the Catholic Church to sensitize public opinion and the established powers, even proposing an "anti-Spiritist week" similar to the existing "anti-alcohol week" to mobilize society against this evil.[2]

In his work "Espiritismo e Loucura" (1931), Antônio Xavier de Oliveira stated that of the cases he studied at the "Pavilhão de Assistência a Psicopatas," 1,723 people went mad "solely and exclusively due to spiritism." And regarding "O Livro dos Médiuns" (The Mediums' Book):

"It is the cocaine of nervous debilitated individuals who engage in the practice of spiritism. And with one more aggravating factor: it is cheap, within reach of everyone, and precisely for this reason, it leads more people, many more, to asylums than the 'devil's dust,' the 'marvelous cocaine'... It is the toxic substance with which the mentally weak, future guests of insane asylums, poison themselves every day. They read it, assimilate it, include the diabolical essence of which it is composed, and merge the knowledge acquired in Spiritist sessions."

— António Xavier de Oliveira, "Espiritismo e Loucura," Rio de Janeiro, 1921, p. 211.

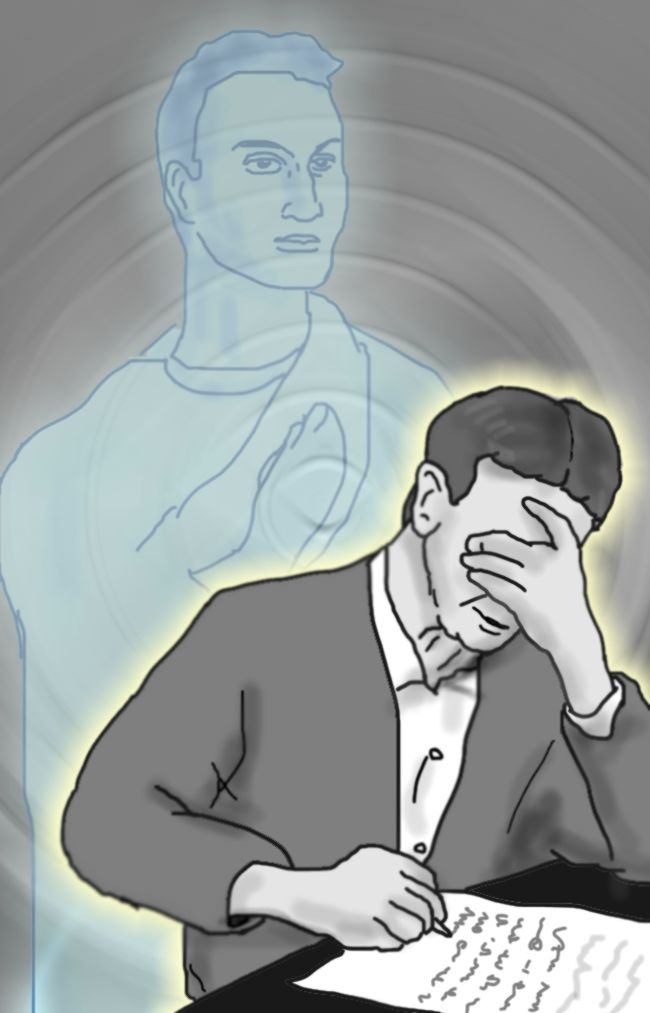
An allegory representing Chico Xavier psychographing a message from Emmanuel, according to the spiritist perspective.

In the same year (1931), Murilo de Campos and Leonídio Ribeiro published the anti-Spiritism book "O Espiritismo no Brasil," seeking to relate spiritism to medicine, where it is stated: "The practice of Spiritism is a police problem, it is a crime against the penal code."[3]

It was also in 1931 that the spirit Emmanuel presented himself to medium Francisco Cândido Xavier, initiating a joint work that would continue until the end of the medium's life. The following year, FEB released the book "Parnaso de Além-Túmulo" (6 July 1932), psychographed by Francisco Cândido Xavier, which gained great repercussion in the Brazilian press, just as the collection "Do País da Luz" had in Portugal at the beginning of the century, through the mediumship of Fernando de Lacerda.[citation needed]

In 1933 the Union Federativa Espírita was founded in São Paulo, affiliated with FEB. In 1936 the Liga Espírita was created in the same state, affiliated with the Liga Espírita do Brasil. In the same year, through Radio Cultura de Araraquara in the interior of São Paulo, Cairbar Schutel started the first Spiritist radio program in the country (19 August).

With the establishment of the Estado Novo in the country in 1937, repression of spiritism increased.[4] FEB itself was closed by the police (27 October) and reopened three days later by order of the then Minister of Justice, José Carlos de Macedo Soares. In the following year (1938), the work "Brasil, Coração do Mundo, Pátria do Evangelho" was published, also psychographed by Francisco Cândido Xavier and attributed to the spirit of Humberto de Campos. The book narrates the formation of Brazil from a Spiritist perspective, in which spiritual entities are said to have influenced the country's main historical events, from the "diversion" of Cabral's fleet to the abolition of slavery, prophesying a prominent place among Christianity.[5]

In 1939 the First Brazilian Congress of Journalists and Spiritist Writers took place.

During this decade, the medium Francisco Peixoto Lins, affectionately referred to as "Peixotinho," also began his work.

The decade ended with the reform of the Penal Code (1940), which no longer explicitly criminalized the practice of spiritism. But in the following year (1941) all Spiritist centers in the then federal capital were suspended by police order, similarly to all Afro-Brazilian temples. In Rio de Janeiro, the Society of Medicine and Spiritism of Rio de Janeiro was founded (11 June 1941), with Dr Levindo Gonçalves de Mello as its first president.

During the context of World War II, starting from 1943, writer Monteiro Lobato held spiritist sessions at his residence. These sessions, with his wife Dona Purezinha as the medium, were conducted using the method of the glass and were recorded by the writer himself and published posthumously in the work "Monteiro Lobato e o Espiritismo" (Monteiro Lobato and Spiritism). Sessions were even held in Argentina during the writer's trips to that country from 1946 to 1947.

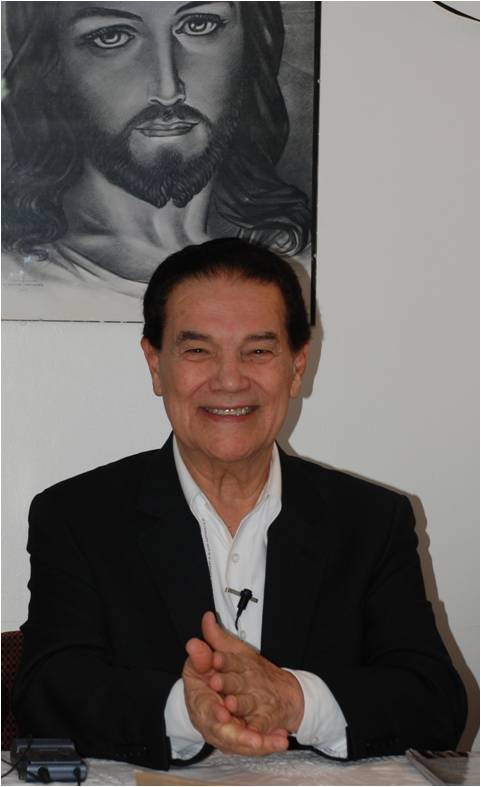
Divaldo Pereira Franco.

Also starting from 1943, the spirit André Luiz, through the mediumship of Francisco Cândido Xavier, began a series of books that address life in the spiritual plane. The first work, "Nosso Lar" (Our Home), was released in Rio de Janeiro the following year (1944).[6] In the same year (1944), D. Catarina Vergolino de Campos, widow of writer Humberto de Campos (who died in 1934), filed a lawsuit against FEB and medium Francisco Cândido Xavier, seeking to receive copyright over the psychographed messages attributed to her late husband.[7] Also in this city and year, the Crusade of Spiritist Military Personnel was founded (10 December 1944).

In 1944 Cornélio Pires published the work "Coisas D'Outro Mundo" (Things from Another World) on the theme of Spiritism. He would publish another Spiritist work in 1947 – "Onde estás, oh Morte?" (Where Are You, O Death?) – and after his death, his literary work would continue through the psychography of Francisco Cândido Xavier.

In 1945 the Espírita Pedro de Alcântara Hospital was founded in Rio de Janeiro. In the same year, in São Paulo, initiated by its federations, a new process for the unification of the Spiritist movement in the country began, leading to the First Spiritist Congress of the State of São Paulo in 1947, in favor of unification. The following year (1948), the Centro-Sulino Spiritist Congress, also in favor of unification, took place in São Paulo.

With the end of the Estado Novo, the Brazilian Constitution of 1946 guaranteed broad religious freedom in the country.

In the state of Bahia, at the end of the decade, the charitable work of Divaldo Pereira Franco began. Together with a group of collaborators, he founded the Caminho da Redenção Spiritist Center in Salvador (7 September 1947), where the following year, under the guidance of the spirit Auta de Souza, he started the "Campanha de Fraternidade Auta de Souza" (Auta de Souza Fraternity Campaign) to assist families in need (9 September 1948).[citation needed]

Given the movement in São Paulo in favor of unification, the most important event of the period took place in Rio de Janeiro: the approval of the eighteen items of the Pacto Áureo (Golden Pact), considered the most important document of the spiritist movement in the country (5 October 1949). The document aimed to unify the state federations around FEB. In the following year (1950), the National Federative Council was established, composed of representatives from the affiliated entities. Also in 1950, the Caravana da Fraternidade (Fraternity Caravan) departed from Rio de Janeiro to the Northeast Region of Brazil, including participants such as Lins de Vasconcelos, Carlos Jordão da Silva, and Leopoldo Machado. This resulted in an increase in the number of state federations in the country.

In terms of dissemination, the Second Pan-American Spiritist Congress took place on 2 October 1949, in Rio de Janeiro, promoted by the Confederação Espírita Pan-Americana and the Liga Espírita do Brasil. Almost all Latin American countries, as well as the United States, participated in the event. The presidency of the Second Congress was entrusted to Argentine doctor Luís Di Cristóforo Postiglione, who invited Francisco Klörs Wemeck and Deolindo Amorim to serve as secretaries. Representatives from almost all Latin American countries, as well as the United States, participated in this event.[8]

== Decades of the 1950s and 1960s ==
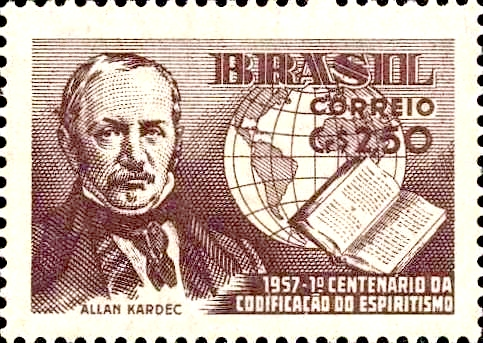
Postage stamp from the Post Office in honor of the centenary of Spiritism (1957).

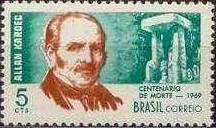
Postage stamp from the Post Office in honor of the centenary of Kardec's passing (1969).

In the country, spiritism in the 1950s and 1960s was marked by two major phenomena: José Pedro de Freitas, popularly known as "Zé Arigó" – whose mediumistic practice was not strictly affiliated with spiritist doctrine or any official institution -; and Francisco Cândido Xavier, popularly known as "Chico Xavier". Zé Arigó, while "receiving" the spirit of Dr. Fritz, provided free mediumistic treatment to thousands of people and faced two legal proceedings accusing him of witchcraft and illegal practice of medicine: one in 1958, in which he was not imprisoned because he received a pardon from then-president Juscelino Kubitschek – whose daughter had been treated by Arigó – and another in 1964, during which he spent a few months in prison but continued to perform mediumistic treatments. Chico Xavier completed his 100th psychographed book and always assigned the copyright of his psychographed books to charitable institutions, and he co-founded the "Christian Spiritist Communion" spiritist center in Uberaba with the medium and physician Waldo Vieira, where they conducted extensive mediumistic and philanthropic activities. He was also accused of fraud (which was not proven and later retracted), in 1958, by his nephew Amauri Pena, and he was involved, along with Waldo Vieira, in the scandal of the so-called "materializations of Uberaba" in 1964, which was covered in 70 pages of the magazine "O Cruzeiro," accompanied by 87 photographs, in eleven editions over a three-month period.

It was also in the 1950s that Father Oscar Quevedo settled in Brazil, initiating a wide dissemination of his interpretation of parapsychology as a response to Spiritism.

In the context of the federative movement that spread after the signing of the so-called "Golden Pact," in 1953 the National Conference of Bishops of Brazil reiterated the Catholic condemnation of spiritism. In the same year, the Brazilian Spiritist Federation (FEB) declared that practitioners of Umbanda could be considered spiritists, which caused strong reactions within the spiritist movement.

On 9 December 1957, the Institute of Spiritist Culture of Brazil was founded in the city of Rio de Janeiro by the sociologist Deolindo Amorim.

Also in 1957, in Ribeirão Preto, the caravan members of Auta de Souza, led by Nympho de Paula Corrêa, created the gathering known as Concafras-PSE – Fraternity Campaigns of Auta de Souza and Spiritist Social Promotion, held annually during the Carnival period in different cities.

In 1960 the work "Spiritism in Brazil" by Friar Boaventura Kloppenburg, a Catholic activist opposed to Spiritism, was published.

On 13 December 1963, the Brazilian Institute of Psychobiophysical Research (IBPP) was founded in the city of São Paulo by the engineer and Spiritist parapsychologist Hernani Guimarães Andrade.

In Rio de Janeiro, Colonel Jaime Rolemberg de Lima launched the informational newsletter "Serviço Espírita de Informações" (May 1965).

In 1968 the Medical-Spiritist Association of São Paulo was founded, which soon influenced the emergence of several other medical-spiritist associations in the country.

== The 1970s and 1980s ==
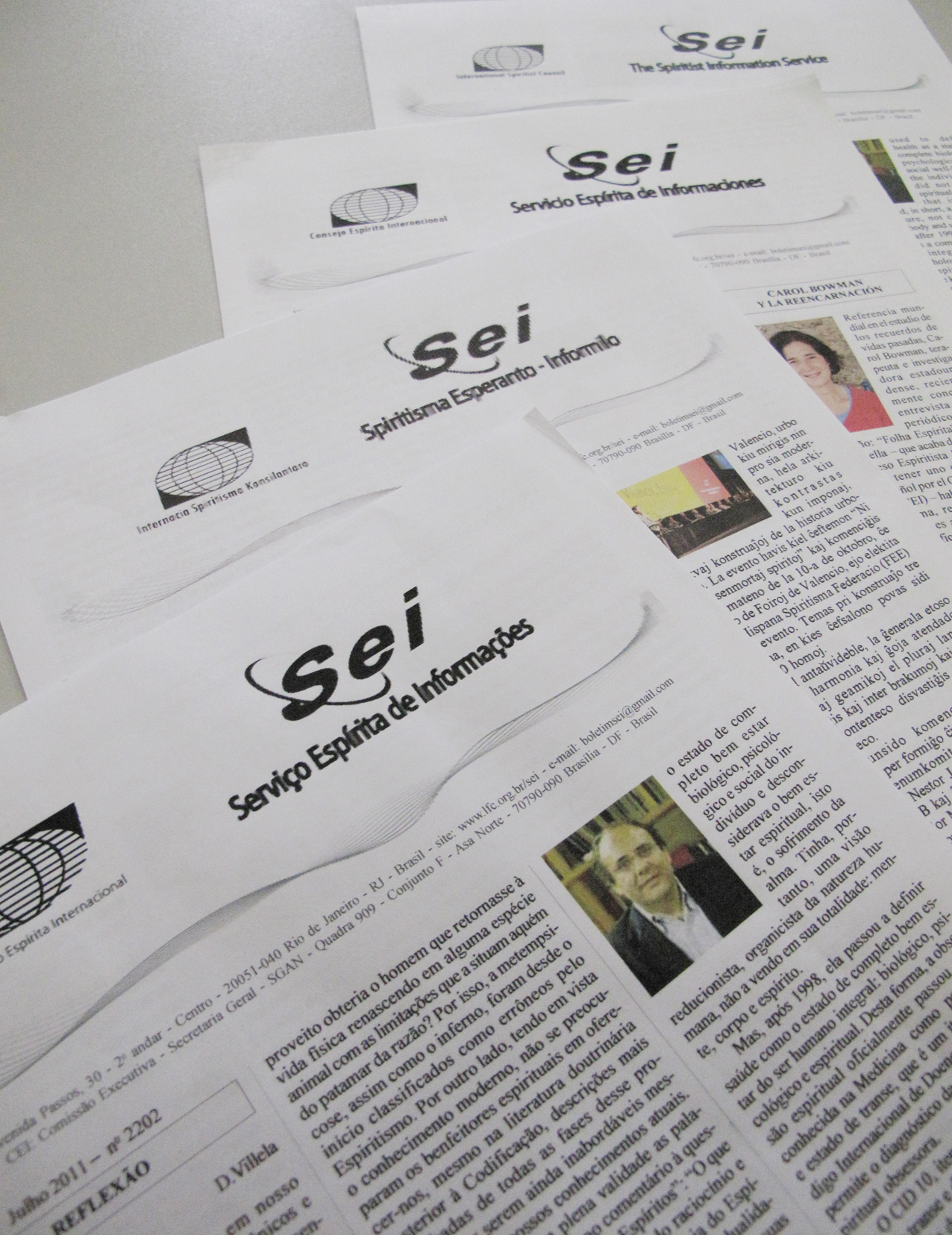
Serviço Espírita de Informações in Portuguese, Esperanto, Spanish, and English.

The 1970s began with two historic interviews with Chico Xavier, aired by the now-defunct TV Tupi Channel 4 in São Paulo, on the program "Pinga-Fogo". The first interview took place on the night of 28 July, which achieved the highest audience rating in the history of Brazilian television, and the second on 21 December 1971, which was also a great success in terms of viewership.

In Rio de Janeiro Radio Rio de Janeiro (1971) was founded, becoming the first spiritist radio station in the country.

In the early 1970s the Spiritist Pedagogy movement also began, with philosopher José Herculano Pires as a pioneer.

In 1975 the first Brazilian soap opera with a central spiritist theme, A Viagem, aired on TV Tupi.

The film Joelma 23rd Floor (1979) was released, directed by Clery Cunha and starring Beth Goulart, based on the work "Somos Seis" psychographed by Chico Xavier. This is the first Brazilian film with a central spiritist theme and the only one that portrayed the Joelma Building fire, which claimed 179 lives and left over 300 injured on 1 February 1974. Also in 1979, one of the most famous cases involving Chico Xavier and which had worldwide repercussion occurred: the case in which José Divino Nunes, accused of killing his best friend, Maurício Henriques, was acquitted by the judge, who accepted as valid evidence (among others presented by the defense) a psychographed text by Chico Xavier from the deceased victim himself.

The 1980s were marked by the campaign to propose Chico Xavier as a candidate for the Nobel Peace Prize (1981), and by the launch, by FEB, of the Systematic Study of Spiritist Doctrine (1983), a permanent institutional campaign aimed at promoting collective deepening in the studies of the Spiritist Doctrine. Journalist Elsie Dubugras brought to public attention what would become a media phenomenon in the country, with international projection: the psychopictography of Luiz Antônio Gasparetto.

In the mid-1980s there was a resurgence of the phenomenon of Dr. Fritz, through the medium from Pernambuco, Edson Cavalcante Queiroz, who would later be murdered in 1991.

1987 stood out for the release of the book "O Lado Oculto do Folclore Brasileiro" by medium Luiz Antonio Millecco.

In 1988, the medium Benjamin Teixeira de Aguiar founded the Maria Cristo Society and in 1994 began presenting the television program Salto Quântico, the oldest spiritualist program in Brazil still on air.

At the end of the decade the International Spiritist Congress took place in Brasília from 1 to 5 October 1989.

== From the 1990s to the present day ==
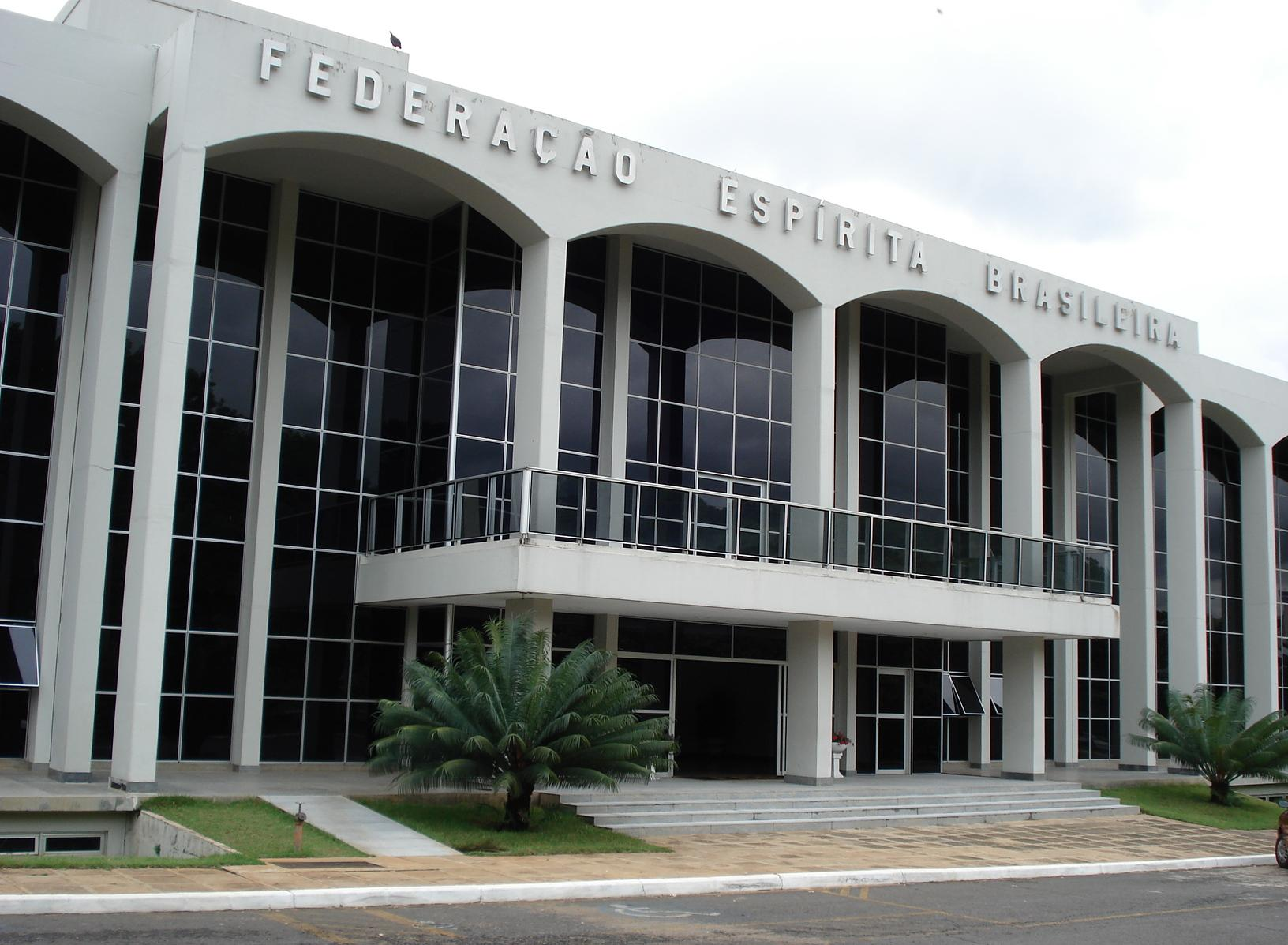
Current headquarters of the Brazilian Spiritist Federation (Brasília).

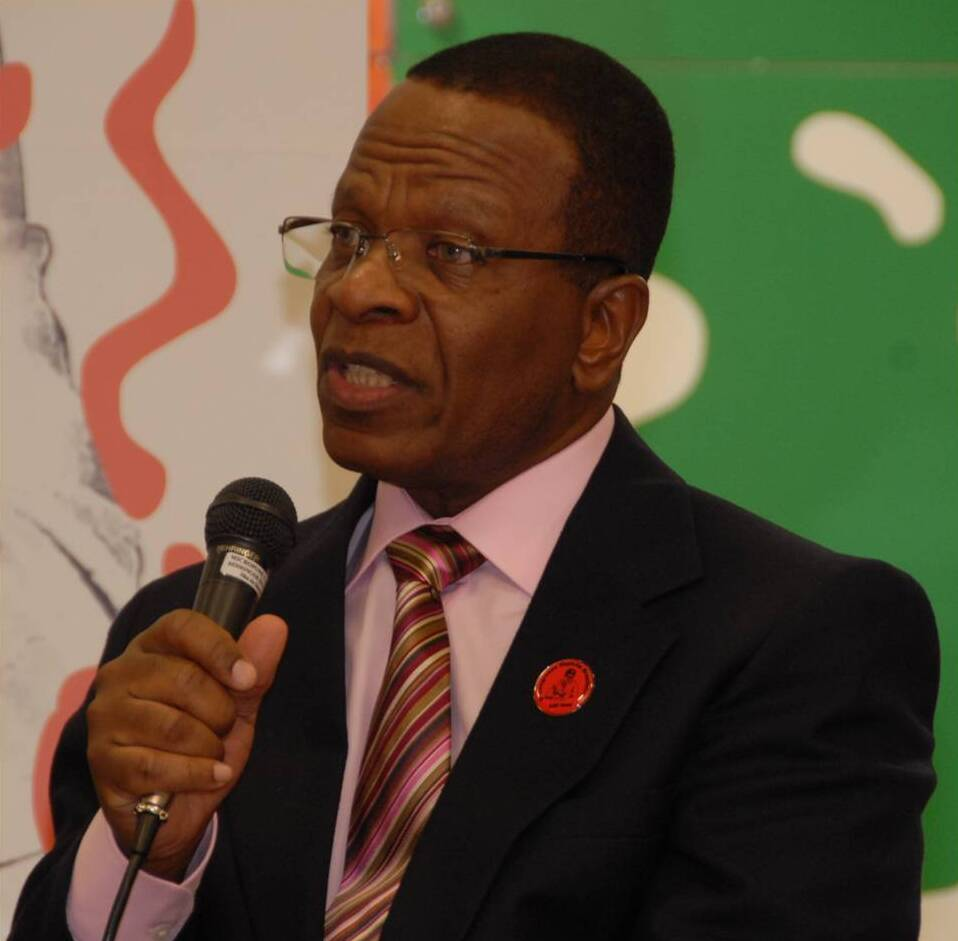
José Raul Teixeira

The 1990s were marked by the establishment, in October 1992, of the Advanced Spiritist Study Group, a virtual study and news dissemination group that brought the Spiritist movement to the Internet.

In terms of publishing, popular spiritist literature gained popularity with the so-called "Spiritist novels," by authors such as Vera Lúcia Marinzeck ("Reconciliation", 1990; "Violetas na Janela", 1993) and Zíbia Gasparetto ("Vencendo o Passado", 2008). The popularity achieved by these authors, as well as the profits obtained from the sales of their works, however, sparked controversy among more orthodox followers of the spiritist doctrine, under the argument of disinterest in classical authors (and the consequent decline in sales of their titles). Nevertheless, this did not prevent the emergence of successful authors such as Elisa Masselli ("Nada fica sem Resposta", 2001); Mônica de Castro ("Gêmeas", 2009); Marcelo Cezar ("O Amor é para os Fortes", 2010); Robson Pinheiro ("Tambores de Angola"); and Rubens Saraceni (the latter two also classified as Umbanda literature), among others.

In 1995 the World Spiritist Congress took place in Brasília, with 3,000 registrations. The Brazilian Association of Spiritist Doctors and the Brazilian Association of Spiritist Psychologists were also founded.

In 1999 there was a scandal involving accusations against medium Rubens Farias Jr., further fueling the controversy surrounding the activities of the entity Dr. Fritz.

The end of the decade was marked by the founding of the International Spiritist Medical Association (AME-I) and the Brazilian Association of Spiritist Judges.

For the movement in the country, the 21st century brought the advent of spiritist television with channels such as Rede Visão (2004) and TV Mundo Maior (2006).

The end of the first decade of the century was marked by the use of cinema as a means of dissemination. The following films were released:

- Bezerra de Menezes - O Diário de um Espírito (2008), directed by Glauber Filho and Joe Pimentel, narrating the story of Bezerra de Menezes;
- Chico Xavier (2010), starring Nelson Xavier and Ângelo Antônio, follows the footsteps of the previous film and tells the story of Francisco Cândido Xavier;
- Nosso lar (2010), directed by Wagner de Assis, based on the book of the same name psychographed by Francisco Cândido Xavier.
- As Cartas Psicografadas por Chico Xavier (2010), a documentary film directed by Cristiana Grumbach, showing the testimony of families who received news from their deceased loved ones through letters psychographed by Francisco Cândido Xavier.
- O Último Romance de Balzac (2010), directed by Geraldo Sarno, based on the psychographed work by Waldo Vieira entitled "Cristo Espera por Ti" and the work "O Avesso de um Balzac Contemporâneo" by Osmar Ramos Filho.
- As Mães de Chico Xavier (2011), directed by Glauber Filho and Halder Gomes, with a screenplay by the same directors based on the book "Por Trás do Véu de Ísis" by Marcel Souto Maior.
- O Filme dos Espíritos (2011), directed by André Marouço and Michel Dubret, with a screenplay loosely based on "O Livro dos Espíritos".
- E a Vida Continua... (2012), directed by Paulo Figueiredo, based on the homonymous work psychographed by Francisco Cândido Xavier.

According to the last demographic census conducted by IBGE in 2010, there were 3.8 million followers of the spiritist doctrine in Brazil. Spiritists are the social segment with the highest income and education level.

Spiritists are strongly associated with charitable practices. They maintain nursing homes, orphanages, schools for underprivileged people, daycare centers, and other social assistance and promotion institutions in all Brazilian states. Allan Kardec, the codifier of Spiritism, is a well-known and respected figure in Brazil. He is the most widely read French author in the country, with his books selling over 25 million copies nationwide. If we consider other Spiritist books, all derived from Kardec's works, the Spiritist publishing market in Brazil exceeds 4,000 titles published and over 100 million copies sold. Spiritist books top the bestseller list in major bookstores in the country.

== Dissent from Kardecism in Brazil ==
Throughout the history of Spiritism in the country, the following schisms or dissents from Kardecism stand out:

=== Roustainguism ===
The Frenchman Jean-Baptiste Roustaing, a contemporary of Allan Kardec, defended, among other things, the thesis that Jesus Christ manifested on Earth not in a physical body, but in a spiritual form. In Brazil, the resulting historical controversy contributed to and fueled a long-standing division between so-called "mystical" and "scientific" spiritists, with ongoing repercussions to this day.

=== Umbanda ===
On 15 November 1908, during a visit by Zélio Fernandino de Moraes to a session of the Spiritist Federation of the State of Rio de Janeiro (located in Niterói, then the capital of the state of Rio de Janeiro), an incident culminated in the manifestation of an entity that identified itself as Caboclo das Sete Encruzilhadas, who announced the foundation of a new religion in the country: Umbanda.

=== Christian Rationalism ===
In the city of Santos, Portuguese immigrants Luís José de Matos and Luís Alves Tomás founded the Centro Espírita Amor e Caridade in 1910 and published the work "Espiritismo Racional e Científico Cristão" in 1914, which became a fundamental work of the new doctrine, now distributed under the title "Christian Rationalism."

Matos, who had been attending spiritist centers in Santos since 1909, believed that there was an excess of religiosity and mysticism among spiritist followers, and that Spiritism should be "the science of sciences, the philosophy of philosophies, but should not be linked to any religious dimension."

=== Ramatisism ===
Initially called "Ramatis' Spiritism" and currently known as universalist spiritualism, it dates back to the second half of the 1950s, when some spiritist centers began studying and defending the works and ideas dictated by the spirit Ramatis (mainly through the psychographed works of Hercílio Maes). They distinguish themselves from traditional spiritist centers due to their greater emphasis on universalism (the common origin of religions) and the comparative study of Western and Eastern spiritualist religions and philosophies. There is also a more pronounced influence of Eastern schools of thought, such as Buddhism and Hinduism.

=== Apometry ===
Although not a religious or doctrinal current, Apometry was based on teachings dictated by spirits. It emerged in the 1960s as an alternative treatment for patients given up by conventional medicine. Through a systematization effort coordinated by Dr. José Lacerda de Azevedo from the Spiritist Hospital of Porto Alegre, the Laws of Apometry were established in the Casa do Jardim in Porto Alegre city in Brazil.

=== Conscientiology ===
It emerged in the mid-1960s with the end of the partnership between mediums Chico Xavier and Waldo Vieira, when the latter began his own research on what he called consciousness projection.

=== Christian Renewal ===
Also emerged as a dissent from the spiritist movement, since September 2002. While not ceasing to follow Spiritist Doctrine, it claims to do so with greater seriousness than the Brazilian movement itself, which is an argument used for distancing.

== See also ==
- Religion in Brazil

== Bibliography ==
- Esboço histórico da Federação Espírita Brasileira. FEB.
- ABIB, D.. CULTURA ESPÍRITA NO BRASIL/ SPIRITIST CULTURE IN BRASIL. Brazilian Cultural Studies, North America, 224 07 2013. p. 106-124.
- ARRIBAS, Célia da Graça. Afinal, espiritismo é religião? A doutrina espírita na formação da diversidade religiosa brasileira. Universidade de São Paulo, 2008.
- DAMAZIO, Sylvia. Da Elite ao Povo. Advento e Expansão do Espiritismo no Rio de Janeiro. Rio de Janeiro: Bertrand Brasil, 1994.
- GODOY, Paulo Alves; LUCENA, Antônio. Personagens do Espiritismo (2nd ed.). São Paulo: Edições FEESP, 1990.
- GOMES, Saulo (ed.). Pinga-fogo com Chico Xavier. Catanduva (SP): InterVidas, 2009. 256p. photos. ISBN 978-85-60960-00-2
- KARDEC, Allan. Revista Espírita – Jornal de Estudos Psicológicos (12 volumes). São Paulo: Edicel, 1985.
- LEWGOY, Bernardo. O Grande Mediador. Chico Xavier e a cultura brasileira. Bauru (SP): EDUSC, 2004.
- MACHADO, Ubiratan. Os Intelectuais e o Espiritismo. Niterói (RJ): Lachâtre, 1996.
- RIBEIRO, Leonídio; CAMPOS, Murilo de. O espiritismo no Brasil. São Paulo, Cia. Editora Nacional, 1931. 199p.
- RIO, João do. Religiões do Rio. 1904.
- THIAGO, L. S.. Homeopatia e Espiritismo (2nd ed.). Rio de Janeiro: FEB 1983.
- TORTEROLI, Angeli. O Espiritismo no Brasil e em Portugal. Rio de Janeiro: Sociedade Acadêmica.
- WANTUIL, Zeus. Grandes Espíritas do Brasil. Rio de Janeiro: FEB, .
