= New Zealand College of Clinical Psychologists =

New Zealand professional body for clinical psychologists

- Formation: 1989
- Type: Professional association
- Headquarters: CSI Logical House Level 6/186 Willis Street, Te Aro; Wellington, New Zealand
- Region served: New Zealand
- Field: Clinical psychology
- Members: 1,850 (2022)
- President: Tricia Stuart; Angus Maxwell
- Website: www.nzccp.co.nz

The New Zealand College of Clinical Psychologists (NZCCP) is a professional association for clinical psychologists in New Zealand.

== History ==
The college was established in August 1989, breaking away from the New Zealand Psychological Society. The college formed in order to promote and coordinate for the profession of Clinical Psychology. By 2004, the college had grown to 450 members.

== Ethics ==
Members of the society are signatories to the Code of Ethics for Psychologists Working in Aotearoa/New Zealand, which was established in 2002 due to the Health Practitioners Competence Assurance Act 2003. Prior to the establishment of the code, each individual professional association for psychologists in New Zealand had their own code of ethics.

== Presidents ==
Past presidents of the New Zealand College of Clinical Psychologists include Olina Carter, John Dugdale, John Bushnell, Nigel Fairley, and Malcolm Stewart

== Publications ==
- Journal of the New Zealand College of Clinical Psychologists
