= PMRT =

PMRT may refer to:

- Peak muscle resistance testing
- Paired multiplex reverse transcriptase PCR (PMRT-PCR)
- Pere Marquette Rail-Trail
- Progressive muscle relaxation therapy
- Purchase money resulting trust
