= BDORT =

Alternative medicine diagnostic procedure

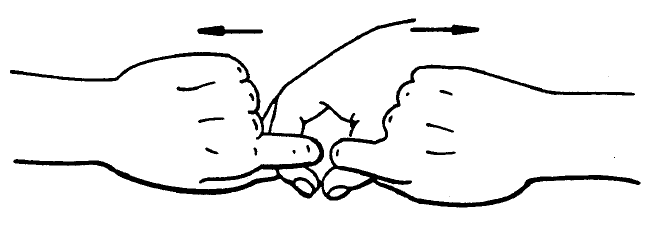
BDORT as illustrated in patent 5188107

The Bi-Digital O-Ring Test (BDORT), characterized as a form of applied kinesiology, is a patented alternative medicine diagnostic procedure in which a patient forms an 'O' with his or her fingers, and the diagnostician subjectively evaluates the patient's health according to the patient's finger strength as the diagnostician tries to pry them apart.

BDORT has been cited and characterized at length by the American Institute for Technology and Science Education as a specific and noteworthy example of pseudoscientific quackery.

BDORT was invented by Yoshiaki Omura, along with several other related alternative medicine techniques. They are featured in Omura's self-published Acupuncture & Electro-Therapeutics Research, The International Journal, of which Omura is founder and editor-in-chief, as well as in seminars presented by Omura and his colleagues.

Omura is registered to practice acupuncture in New York State.

In the only known full, formal independent evaluation of BDORT or of any other BDORT-related treatment and technique by a mainstream scientific or medical body, the Medical Practitioners Disciplinary Tribunal of New Zealand ruled, in two separate cases brought before it in 2003, that Richard Warwick Gorringe, MB, ChB of Hamilton, New Zealand, who used BDORT (which he also called "Peak Muscle Resistance Testing", or "PMRT") to the exclusion of conventional diagnoses on his patients, was guilty of malpractice. In the first case, the Tribunal found it "is not a plausible, reliable, or scientific technique for making medical decisions" and "there is no plausible evidence that PMRT has any scientific validity". In the second case the Tribunal ruled Gorringe again relied on BDORT to the exclusion of traditional diagnoses, which ultimately led to the death of a patient. As a result of these findings and conclusions, Gorringe was fined and stripped of his license to practice medicine.

== Yoshiaki Omura ==
Yoshiaki Omura (大村恵昭, Ōmura Yoshiaki) is president and founder of the International College of Acupuncture & Electro-Therapeutics, president and founder of the International Bi-Digital O-Ring Test Medical Association, and medical research director of the Heart Disease Research Foundation.

== Description ==
The test is a subjective evaluation of a patient's opposing muscle strength in which a diagnostician employs the thumb and forefinger of each hand, formed in the shape of an O, to attempt to force apart an O shape formed by the patient who places the fingertips of their thumb and one of their remaining fingers together. At the same time, the patient holds a slide of organ tissue, a sample of medication, potential allergen, etc., in their free hand, or is otherwise 'probed' at an appropriate acupuncture point by the use of a metal rod or laser pointer. The diagnostician then uses their perception of the strength required to force apart the patient's 'O-Ring' of thumb and one of the remaining fingers to assess the patient's health.

== Patent ==
The United States Patent and Trademark Office (USPTO) rejected the initial BDORT patent application as 'too unbelievable to be true'. The application was then resubmitted in 1987, and the USPTO again rejected it. After receiving expert testimony from Omura's "associates in clinical fields and basic sciences, both in Japan and the United States" regarding BDORT, the USPTO issued US 5188107 in 1993.

The fact that a patent was granted to the BDORT has been cited as an example of 'high weirdness' by one firm of patent attorneys.

== Suggested uses and variants ==
The BDORT is capable, according to its proponents, of a wide range of applications in the diagnosis, prescription of treatment, and evaluation of efficacy of treatment of, amongst others: heart conditions, cancers, "pre-cancers", allergic reactions, viral and bacterial infections, a range of organic and/or environmental stresses, as well as the precise location of acupuncture points and meridians previously unknown or inappropriately identified.

Other than the New Zealand Medical Practitioners Disciplinary Tribunal's reports, there is no known independent mainstream scientific or medical evaluation or validation of any of the BDORT or BDORT-related claims, including the following BDORT variants.

BDORT has also been described in A.R.T.( Autonomic response testing) Training material as one of the diagnostic methods used in advanced Autonomic Response Testing.

=== The indirect method ===
In the indirect method of application an intermediary is employed, and the patient is not directly examined. The intermediary, for example, directs a laser pointer held in their right hand at the appropriate acupuncture point, for example, atop the patient's head, while at the same time the diagnostician performs the test on the left hand of the intermediary.

=== Remote application ===
Omura claims that it is possible, if the procedure is performed by a very experienced practitioner such as himself, to perform the BDORT on a patient over the telephone without having any physical contact with the patient. In this procedure the patient is, for example, instructed to hold in one hand a substance being evaluated, while holding the telephone receiver at the bodily location prescribed by the diagnostician. The practitioner then evaluates the muscle strength necessary to separate the interlocked O–rings of thumb and forefinger of each of his or her own two hands, and uses this data in place of data from standard BDORT on the patient.

=== Selective drug uptake enhancement method ===
The selective drug uptake enhancement method is a central component of BDORT-derived treatments according to Omura. He claims that with this treatment it is possible, via BDORT diagnosis and evaluation coupled with appropriate acupuncture point stimulation, to "target" alternative or conventional medications to specific cells or tissues, for example, cancer cells. According to Omura, when this occurs the medications will have minimal 'uptake' by non-targeted tissues or cells, thus maximizing the efficacy of the prescribed medications while minimizing side effects. There is no known independent verification of these claims.

=== Solar energy stored papers ===
Special solar energy: solar energy stored papers (SESP) is a device which Omura claims was developed using BDORT assessment and evaluation, that can capture a special healing power of sunlight. Omura uses index cards or other ordinary paper and he says the sunlight must be "captured" at the ideal times of sunrise and sunset. Omura says the energy can then be preserved in SESP while maintaining appropriate qigong polarity and shielding the papers from electromagnetic fields by carefully wrapping them in aluminum foil. Thus captured and preserved, he claims that special solar energy is effective in the treatment of a number of conditions, including arthritis, cancers, hypertension, and Alzheimer's disease. He has applied for a patent for this process.

=== Psychic healing ===
Omura, as published in his journal, has investigated the application of psychic healing and psychic surgery in Brazil, particularly that of Rubens Farias, Jr, who claims to channel the spirit of Dr Fritz. Applying the BDORT as his tool of evaluation, he concluded that the effects of psychic healing and psychic surgery were achieved through the application of qigong energy and the use of acupuncture points.

== Medical Practitioners Disciplinary Tribunal of New Zealand review of BDORT ==
The New Zealand Medical Practitioners Disciplinary Tribunal, ruled on two separate malpractice cases against Richard Warwick Gorringe, MB, ChB, of Hamilton, New Zealand.

In the first, held in Wellington in 2003, where BDORT was also referred to as 'PMRT' ('Peak Muscle Resistance Testing') by Gorringe, the tribunal examined and dismissed any claims of scientific validity of BDORT, offering the following summary statement of findings:

We therefore accept that PMRT is not a plausible, reliable, or scientific technique for making medical decisions. We find there is no plausible evidence that PMRT has any scientific validity. It therefore follows that reliance on PMRT to make diagnoses to the exclusion of conventional and/or generally recognized diagnostic/investigatory techniques is unacceptable and irresponsible.

As a result of these findings and conclusions, Gorringe was fined and stripped of his license to practice medicine.

In separate hearings the Medical Practitioners Disciplinary Tribunal held in December 2003 and ruled upon in May 2004 in Auckland, found Gorringe guilty of malpractice in the death of an earlier patient, and concluded that Gorringe's reliance on BDORT to the exclusion of conventional diagnoses led to the patient's death.

=== BDORT testimony used by Wellington tribunal in its decision ===
Several expert witnesses provided testimony about BDORT at the MPDT Wellington hearings, with which the tribunal concurred:

In summary, I find the descriptions of the AK [applied kinesiology] methods and in particular the BDORT test to be inconsistent with known physical principles. Even if it were possible to produce a "field" with these methods, AK [applied kinesiology] methods (and BDORTing) [testing] have not been shown to produce an electrical field which is required to alter the electrical activation of nerve and muscle. A limited survey of the literature shows that the AK [applied kinesiology] testing results are unreliable – and this idea is apparently supported by some organisations that support complementary medicine. I find it deeply disturbing that the only people who seem to claim reliable diagnostic results are those who make a living from applying it and some controlled scientific tests reveal no validity to these claims.

— Professor Mark Bryden Cannell – Tribunal Findings, par. 306

BDORT is operator dependent, meaning that what actually happens is that the operator diagnoses whatever it is that he believes in. One cannot scientifically evaluate "belief". In the context of testing, then, it would be impossible to challenge the practitioner's belief in his apparatus.

— John Charles Welch, MD – Tribunal Findings, par. 314

I think the big problem with the Bi-Digital O-Ring Test is the fact that it's not been properly tested to make sure that the results are reproducible. As Professor Cannell alluded to in his evidence, the key thing about science is a naive observer anywhere in the world should be able to reproduce the results using the same apparatus.

— John Charles Welch, MD – Tribunal Findings, par. 316

=== Equivalence with PMRT ===
In the first New Zealand MPDT report from Wellington in 2003, the tribunal defines the terms PMRT and BDORT as equivalent:

At each consultation Dr Gorringe "muscle tested" Mrs Short by a procedure called "Peak Muscle Resistance Testing" which he used as a diagnostic tool. We refer to this procedure later and throughout this judgment as PMRT. It is also referred to as Bi Digital O Ring Testing (BDORT).

— New Zealand MPDT (2003), par. 100

Later in the same report, the tribunal again equates PMRT and BDORT, but states that the technique used by Gorringe is different from Dr. Omura's:

Dr. Gorringe gave evidence as to the background relating to PMRT (or BDORT) and attributed the origin of it to Dr. Yoshiaki Omura and produced some written material relating to the Omura technique (exhibits 31 and 42). However, it would appear from a perusal of those materials that the technique which Dr. Gorringe practices is different from that practiced by Dr. Omura and therefore the Omura materials do not assist the Tribunal to any real extent.

— New Zealand MPDT (2003), par. 290

The tribunal uses the terms BDORT and PMRT interchangeably throughout the Wellington report from 2003.

In the second MPDT report from Auckland in 2004, the tribunal does not mention PMRT at all, and refers to Gorringe's technique exclusively as 'BDORT'.

The Quackwatch article reviewing these two New Zealand MPDT reports also equates PMRT and BDORT, stating:

The test Gorringe used is called peak muscle resistance testing (PMRT) -- also referred to as bi digital O ring testing (BDORT) -- in which the practitioner observes whether the subject's opposed thumb and fourth fingers can be pulled apart...

— Quackwatch

== BDORT-related courses ==
BDORT-related seminars, given by Omura, are conducted monthly in New York. The University of the State of New York Education Department allows these seminars to count towards course credit for physicians and dentists seeking certification for the application of acupuncture in the course of their practice.

In a Decision of 15 May 2007 the Victorian Civil and Administrative Tribunal, in Victoria, Australia, in an appeal against a decision by the Chinese Medical Registration Board of Victoria refusing registration to practice as an acupuncturist, found that attendance and participation in Yoshiaki Omura's Annual International Symposium on Acupuncture & Electro-Therapeutics as accredited by the University of the State of New York Education Department, in addition to "clinical experience ... with these subjects in respect of real patients" did not meet the Chinese Medicine Board's requirement of "competencies substantially equivalent to" those taught in a Board certified acupuncture class. Given this, the Tribunal ruled that the Board was not required to certify the applicant as a practitioner of Chinese medicine.
