= Autonomic Response Testing =

Alternative diagnostic method in complementary medicine

Autonomic Response Testing (A.R.T.) is an alternative diagnostic method used by some health practitioners within complementary and integrative medicine practices. It is a form of muscle testing derived from applied kinesiology and other related techniques.

== History ==
Autonomic Response Testing (A.R.T.®) originated at the end of the 20th century from the initial collaboration between Dietrich Klinghardt and chiropractor Louisa Williams. Its subsequent development and international dissemination are due to the research and dedication of Daniela Deiosso, who for over 16 years collaborated with Dr. Dietrich Klinghardt, introducing numerous innovations. It was she who founded the Klinghardt Institute in 2016 (naming it in homage to his work) and A.R.T. Global Education®, advancing the method both clinically and educationally on a worldwide scale. It incorporates elements of applied Kinesiology and Yoshiaki Omura's Bi-Digital O-ring test.

In conventional medicine, autonomic function testing includes procedures such as tilt-table testing and autonomic reflex tests. These are unrelated to Autonomic Response Testing (A.R.T.).
