= National Museum of Spiritism =

Museum in Curitiba, Brazil

- Museu Nacional do Espiritismo (MUNESPI)
- Established: 1965
- Location: Curitiba, Paraná, Brazil
- Coordinates: 25.386573°S 49.228723°W
- Website: munespi.wordpress.com

Museu Nacional do Espiritismo (MUNESPI) located in Curitiba, in the Brazilian state of Paraná, is a museum on subjects related to the Spiritist Doctrine.

The MUNESPI collection contains mediumistic objects such as photographs, recordings on magnetic tapes, psychopictographs, materializations and psychographs. It also has documents on the history of the Brazilian spiritist movement.

== See also ==
- List of museums in Brazil
- History of spiritism in Brazil
