= Arigo =

Arigo may refer to:

- John Arigo, Filipino-American basketball player
- Zé Arigó (1921–1971), Brazilian psychic surgeon
- Arigo (film), a 2000 film by Alan Arkin
- Arigo software, used by manufacturers, wholesalers and retailers for sourcing and product development.
