= Psychic surgery =

Medical fraud

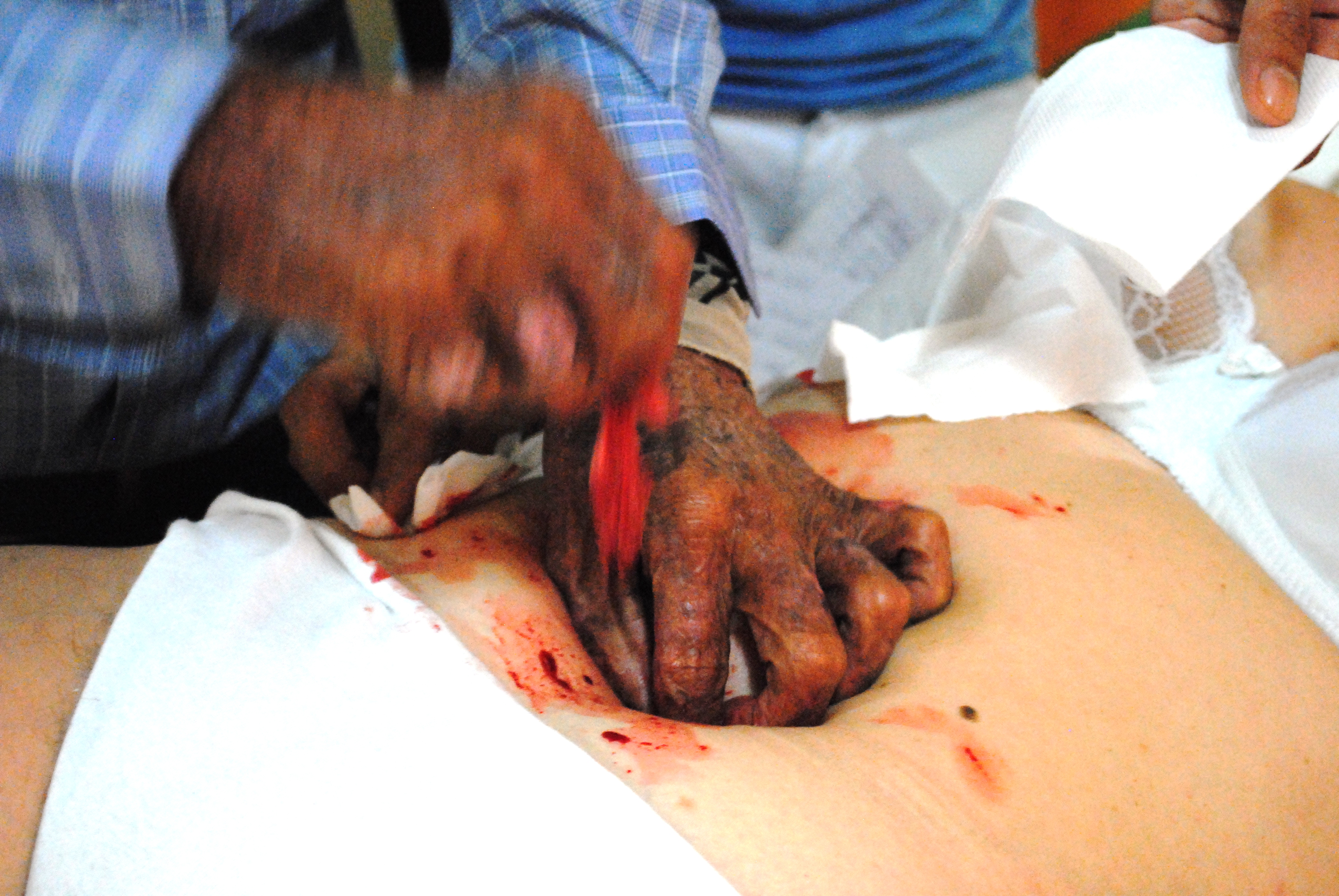
An alleged psychic surgeon at work

Psychic surgery is a medical fraud in which practitioners create the illusion of performing surgery with their bare hands and use sleight of hand, fake blood, and animal parts to convince the patient that diseased lesions have been removed and that the incision has spontaneously healed. The technique may fool the general public, but it can be observed by experienced stage magicians, who use the same sleight of hand techniques for entertainment.

The US Federal Trade Commission described psychic surgery as a "total hoax". It has also been described as fraud, fakery, deceitful, irrational, charlatanry, and quackery. Even supporters have been forced to admit that sleight-of-hand tricks were "widely used" and that charlatans were common and miracles unlikely. Psychic surgery may cause needless death by keeping the ill away from life-saving medical care. Medical professionals and skeptics classify it as sleight of hand and any positive results as a placebo effect.

Psychic surgery first appeared in the spiritualist communities of the Philippines and Brazil in the middle of the 20th century; it has taken different paths in those two countries.

== Procedure ==
Although psychic surgery varies by region and practitioner, it usually follows some common lines. Without the use of a surgical instrument, a practitioner will press the tips of their fingers against the patient's skin in the area to be treated. The practitioner's hands appear to penetrate into the patient's body painlessly and blood seems to flow. The practitioner will then show organic matter or foreign objects apparently removed from the patient's body, clean the area, and then end the procedure with the patient's skin showing no wounds or scars.

Most cases do not involve actual surgery although some practitioners make real incisions. The lack of pain upon incision has been attributed to a type of hypnosis.

In regions of the world where belief in evil spirits is prevalent, practitioners will sometimes exhibit objects, such as glass, saying that the foreign bodies were placed in the patient's body by evil spirits.

== History ==
Accounts of psychic surgery started to appear in the spiritualist communities of the Philippines and Brazil in the mid-1900s. The 16th-century explorer Álvar Núñez Cabeza de Vaca records an account, related to him by Native Americans, of a bearded figure known as "Mala Cosa" (Evil Thing), who would take hold of a person, cut into their abdomen with a flint knife, and remove a portion of their entrails, which he would then burn in a fire. When he was done the incision would close spontaneously.

=== Philippines ===
In the Philippines, the procedure was first noticed in the 1940s, when performed routinely by Eleuterio Terte. Terte and his pupil Tony Agpaoa, who was apparently associated with the Union Espiritista Christiana de Filipinas (The Christian Spiritist Union of the Philippines), trained others in this procedure.

In 1959, the procedure came to the attention of the U.S. public after the publication of Into the Strange Unknown by Ron Ormond and Ormond McGill. The authors called the practice "fourth dimensional surgery", and wrote "[we] still don’t know what to think; but we have motion pictures to show it wasn’t the work of any normal magician, and could very well be just what the Filipinos said it was — a miracle of God performed by a fourth dimensional surgeon."

In "...1973, a group of medical doctors, scientists, and parapsychologists visited the Philippine Islands to study a phenomenon that was causing increased furor amongst health professionals ... Filipino psychic surgeons, also known as spiritual/magnetic healers."

Alex Orbito, who became well known in the United States through his association with actress Shirley MacLaine was a practitioner of the procedure. On June 14, 2005, Orbito was arrested by Canadian authorities and indicted for fraud. On January 20, 2006, the charges were dropped as it then seemed unlikely that Orbito would be convicted.

Psychic surgery made U.S. tabloid headlines in March 1984 when entertainer Andy Kaufman, diagnosed with large cell carcinoma (a rare lung cancer), traveled to the Philippines for a six-week course of psychic surgery. Practitioner Jun Labo claimed to have removed large cancerous tumors and Kaufman declared he believed this cancer had been removed. Kaufman died from renal failure as consequence of a metastatic lung cancer, on May 16, 1984.

=== Brazil ===
The origins of the practice in Brazil are obscure, but by the late 1950s "spiritual healers" were practicing in the country. Many of them were associated with Kardecist spiritism, a major spiritualistic movement in Brazil, and claimed to be performing their operations merely as channels for spirits of deceased medical doctors.

A known Brazilian psychic healer who routinely practiced psychic surgery was Zé Arigó, who claimed to be channeling a (fictional) medical doctor named Dr. Fritz. Unlike most other psychic healers, who work bare-handed, Arigó used a non-surgical blade. Other psychic healers who claimed to channel Dr. Fritz were Edson Queiroz and Rubens Farias Jr. Later, one João de Faria, also known as João de Deus, became popular while he operated in Abadiânia, state of Goiás. Faria has since been arrested and found guilty of the rapes of several women. Dozens of similar accusations are awaiting trial.

According to the descriptions of Yoshiaki Omura, Brazilian psychic surgery appears to be different from that practiced in the Philippines. Omura calls attention to the fact that practitioners in Brazil use techniques resembling qigong, shiatsu massage, and chiropractic manipulation. Some patients are also injected with a brown liquid, and alleged minor surgery was performed in about 20% of the cases observed. While Arigó performed his procedures using kitchen knives in improvised settings, Omura reports that the clamping of blood vessels and the closing of the surgical wounds were performed by licensed surgeons or licensed nurses.

=== North America ===
In the 1970s a specific form of surgery known as psychic dentistry emerged in America. Willard Fuller was the most well known proponent. It was alleged that Fuller could cause dental fillings to appear spontaneously, change silver into golden fillings, straighten crooked teeth or produce new teeth. However, magicians and skeptics have found these claims to be unsupported by solid evidence. One dentist examined some patients of Fuller. In one case miraculous gold fillings turned out to be tobacco stains. In another case a female patient who reported a miraculous new silver filling admitted she had forgotten that the filling was already there.

== Medical and legal criticism ==
In 1975, the Federal Trade Commission declared that "'psychic surgery' is nothing but a total hoax". Judge Daniel H. Hanscom, when granting the FTC an injunction against travel agencies promoting psychic surgery tours, declared: "Psychic surgery is pure and unmitigated fakery. The 'surgical operations' of psychic surgeons ... with their bare hands are simply phony."

In 1975 the FTC stated:

It has been found that "psychic surgery" is pure fakery. The body is not opened, no "surgery" is performed with the bare hands or with anything else, and nothing is removed from the body. The entire "operation" is an egregious fraud perpetrated by sleight-of-hand and similar tricks and devices.

In 1990, the American Cancer Society stated that it "found no evidence that 'psychic surgery' results in objective benefit in the treatment of any medical condition," and strongly urged individuals who are ill not to seek treatment by psychic surgery.

The British Columbia Cancer Agency "strongly urges individuals who are ill not to seek treatment by psychic surgeon".

While not directly hazardous to the patient, the belief in the alleged benefits of psychic surgery may carry considerable risk for individuals with diagnosed medical conditions, as they may delay or forgo conventional medical help, sometimes with fatal consequences.

== Replication by stage magicians ==
Stage magician James Randi said psychic surgery is a sleight of hand confidence trick. He said that in personal observations of the procedure, and in movies showing the procedures, he could spot sleight-of-hand moves that are evident to experienced stage magicians, but might deceive a casual observer. Randi replicated the appearance of psychic surgery himself through the use of sleight-of-hand. Professional magician Milbourne Christopher also investigated psychic surgeons at work, and observed sleight of hand. On his A&E show Mindfreak in the episode "Sucker", illusionist Criss Angel performed "Psychic Surgery", showing first-hand how it may be done (fake blood, plastic bags and chicken livers were used).

Randi said the healer would slightly roll or pinch the skin over the area to be treated. When his flattened hand reaches under the roll of skin, it looks and feels as if the practitioner is actually entering into the patient's body. The healer would have prepared in advance small pellets or bags of animal entrails which would be palmed in his hand or hidden beneath the table within easy reach. This organic matter would simulate the "diseased" tissue that the healer would claim to be removing. If the healer wants to simulate bleeding, he might squeeze a bladder of animal blood or an impregnated sponge. If done properly, this procedure may deceive patients and observers. Some "psychic surgery" procedures do not rely solely on the "sleight of hand" described, as at least one Brazilian "surgeon" also cuts his victims' skin with an unsterilized scalpel to heighten the illusion.

== Accusations of fraud ==
The physician William Nolen investigated psychic surgery and his book Healing: A Doctor in Search of a Miracle (1974) uncovered many cases of fraud. Tony Agpaoa, a famous psychic surgeon, was detected several times using trickery.

John Taylor has written there is no real case for psychic surgery as the explanation of fraud is highly likely in all the operations. The practitioners use sleight of hand techniques to produce blood or blood-like fluids, animal tissue or substitutes, and/or various foreign objects from folds of skin of the patient as part of a confidence trick for financial benefit.

Science writer Terence Hines has written:

The "operation" starts as the hand appears to enter the patient’s belly. This is accomplished by creating an impression in the belly by pushing down and flexing the fingers slowly into a fist—the fingers thus appear to be moving into the belly, but are really simply hidden behind the hand. The blood that further disguises the true movement of the fingers and adds drama to the proceedings can come from two sources. One is a fake thumb, worn over the real thumb and filled with a red liquid. Such a fake thumb is a common magician’s implement. Blood can also be passed to the surgeon in red balloons hidden in cotton the psychic surgeon is using, the cotton and its hidden contents being passed to him by an "assistant". The bits of "tumor" can also be passed to the psychic surgeon this way, or hidden in the false thumb... the "tumor" material turns out to be chicken intestines or similar animal remains. The blood is either animal blood or red dye.

Two "psychic surgeons" provided testimony in a Federal Trade Commission trial that, to their knowledge, the organic matter supposedly removed from the patients usually consists of animal tissue and clotted blood.

== In popular culture ==
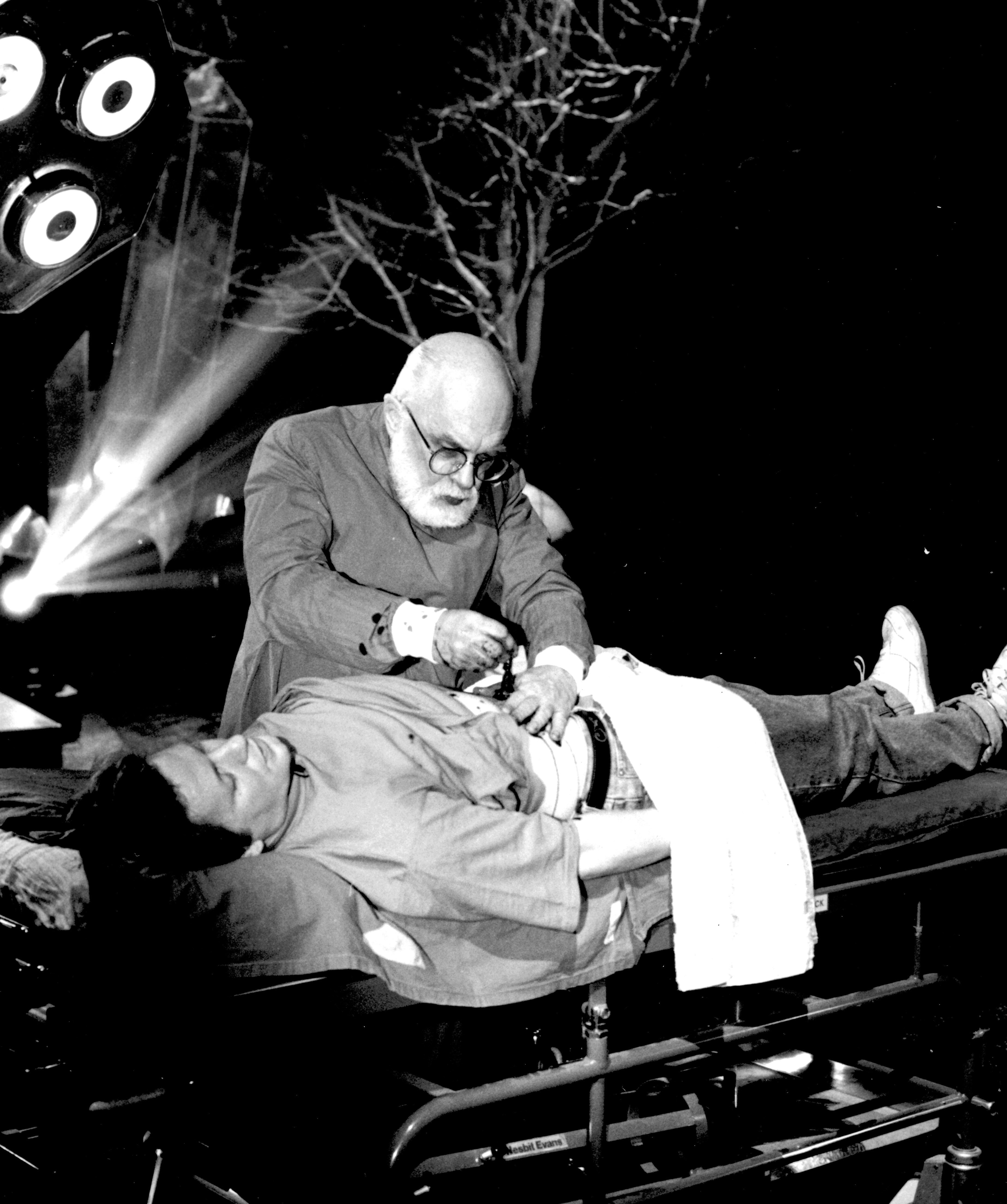
James Randi using sleight of hand to duplicate "psychic surgery" on his Open Media series for ITV in 1991

- In the 1967 novel by Gabriel García Márquez, One Hundred Years of Solitude, the character Fernanda maintains regular correspondence with so called "Invisible Doctors" who practice a form of psychic surgery on her.
- In the 1989 film Penn & Teller Get Killed, comedic magicians Penn and Teller demonstrate how to perform the illusion of psychic surgery.
- A 1989 episode of Unsolved Mysteries featured a police officer whose mother claimed to have been cured by psychic surgery, only to die shortly thereafter; her autopsy revealed several tumors. The policeman described himself going undercover to feign illness and pretended to desire psychic surgery, having the feeling of the practitioner using sleight of hand to supposedly dig into his tissue, as well as suspecting that the "cysts" and "tumors" being removed from his body were actually ready-made chicken parts.
- "Milagro", a sixth-season episode from The X-Files, features a killer accused of using psychic surgery on his victims, killing them in the process.
- In the BBC TV series Full Circle with Michael Palin, Michael Palin witnesses two separate instances of psychic surgery in the Baguio district of the Philippines. On raising his suspicion with the medic that it seemed a sleight of hand to him, the medic told him he was a westerner and could only understand the surgery if he had a third eye. Palin assists another medic in a surgery and was told that no contamination happens in this procedure because of the use of garlic.
- In the 1993 novel by Ana Castillo, So Far from God, Filipino Dr. Tolentino performs psychic surgery on La Loca after diagnosing her with HIV.
- In the 1998 Christmas Special of the BBC1 series Jonathan Creek, entitled "Black Canary", the husband of the illusionist known as Black Canary undergoes psychic surgery at the start of the episode and this form of surgery forms a plot device throughout the special.
- In the 1999 movie Man on the Moon, based on the life of Andy Kaufman, Kaufman (Jim Carrey) receives psychic surgery and notices the "sleight of hand," laughing at the irony. He is next seen dead, with his funeral being conducted.
- In the TV series Angel, Season 1 episode "I Fall to Pieces (Angel)" features a doctor who practices psychic surgery.
- In the 2000 short story "Stalemate" by Ian Rankin, narrator Calumn Smylie attributes his scarred abdomen to a childhood cure by a Filipino psychic surgeon who supposedly extracted his "evil juices" bare-handed.
- In the TV show Criss Angel Mindfreak, Season 2 Episode "Sucker", Criss explains psychic surgery as a deception.
- In the television show 1000 Ways to Die, a con artist was using this to scam poor country people, only to lead to his death when he used it on a leper from whom he caught the disease.
- In the 2012 movie Red Lights Simon Silver, an alleged psychic, performs a psychic surgery on stage.
- In a deleted scene from the 2016 movie Deadpool, Wade Wilson (Ryan Reynolds) visits a psychic surgery clinic in an attempt to cure his cancer, but upon realizing the clinic is scamming innocent clients into spending their life savings on simple sleight of hand, he attacks and murders the head surgeon in front of the staff.

== See also ==
- Alternative cancer treatments
- Faith healing
- Gray's Anatomy (film)
- Health fraud
- List of topics characterized as pseudoscience
- Psychic
- Psychokinesis
