= Chiropractic professional ethics =

Various organizations of practicing chiropractors have outlined formal codes of professional ethics. Actual practice has revealed a wide range of behaviors which may or may not conform to these standards.

== Official positions ==
The American Chiropractic Association (ACA) has a "Code of Ethics" "based upon the acknowledgement that the social contract dictates the profession’s responsibilities to the patient, the public, and the profession; and upholds the fundamental principle that the paramount purpose of the chiropractic doctor's professional services shall be to benefit the patient." The smaller International Chiropractor's Association (ICA) also has a detailed set of professional canons.

== Reports of actual practice ==
Various situations have occurred in which the ethics of chiropractors and chiropractic organizations have been called into question.

A 2008 commentary proposed that the chiropractic profession actively regulate itself to combat abuse, fraud, and quackery, which are more prevalent in chiropractic than in other health care professions, violating the social contract between patients and physicians.

Gleberzon et al. identify "deliberate fraud" as a notably harmful element of the chiropractic profession, finding that dubious practice techniques can translate into "outlandish billing and utilization rates". Those at the "fringe of ethical behavior" present the profession with a challenge, they believe, and must be weeded out.

A study of California disciplinary statistics during 1997–2000 reported 4.5 disciplinary actions per 1000 chiropractors per year, compared to 2.27 for medical doctors, and the incident rate for fraud was nine times greater among chiropractors (1.99 per 1000 chiropractors per year) than among medical doctors (0.20). According to a 2006 Gallup poll of U.S. adults, when asked how they would "rate the honesty and ethical standards of people in these different fields", chiropractic compared unfavorably with mainstream medicine. When chiropractic was rated, it "rated dead last amongst healthcare professions". While 84% of respondents considered nurses' ethics "very high" or "high," only 36% felt that way about chiropractors. Other healthcare professions ranged from 38% for psychiatrists, to 62% for dentists, 69% for medical doctors, 71% for veterinarians, and 73% for druggists or pharmacists. Similar results were found in the 2003 Gallup Poll.

In 2001, the largest chiropractic associations in the U.S. and Canada were reported to have distributed patient brochures which contained unsubstantiated claims. Chiropractors, especially in America, have a reputation for unnecessarily treating patients. In many circumstances the focus seems to be put on economics instead of health care. Sustained chiropractic care is promoted as a preventative tool, but unnecessary manipulation could possibly present a risk to patients. Some chiropractors are concerned by the routine unjustified claims chiropractors have made. A 2010 analysis of chiropractic websites found the majority of chiropractors and their associations made claims of effectiveness not supported by scientific evidence, while 28% of chiropractic websites advocate lower back pain care, which has some sound evidence.

Although in the vast majority of US States chiropractors are considered physicians pursuant to statute (exceptions are inter alia, New York and California). The Joint Commission recognizes chiropractors as physicians as well. In some jurisdictions, like New Zealand, chiropractors appeared to have used the title 'doctor' in a New Zealand yellow pages telephone directory in a way that implied they are registered medical practitioners, when no evidence was presented it was true. In New Zealand, chiropractors are allowed to use the title 'doctor' when it is qualified to show that the title refers to their chiropractic role. A representative from the NZ Chiropractic Board states that entries in the yellow pages under the heading of 'Chiropractors' fulfills this obligation when suitably qualified. If a chiropractor is not a registered medical practitioner, then the misuse of the title 'doctor' while working in healthcare will not comply with the Health Practitioners Competence Assurance Act 2003.

UK chiropractic organizations and their members make numerous claims which are not supported by scientific evidence. Many chiropractors adhere to ideas which are against science and most seemingly violate important principles of ethical behaviour on a regular basis. The advice chiropractors gave to their patients is often misleading and dangerous. In 2009, a backlash to the libel suit filed by the British Chiropractic Association (BCA) against Simon Singh, has inspired the filing of formal complaints of false advertising against more than 500 individual chiropractors within one 24-hour period, prompting the McTimoney Chiropractic Association to write to its members advising them to remove leaflets that make claims about whiplash and colic from their practice, to be wary of new patients and telephone inquiries, and telling their members: "If you have a website, take it down NOW." and "Finally, we strongly suggest you do NOT discuss this with others, especially patients." An editorial in Nature has suggested that the BCA may be trying to suppress debate and that this use of British libel law is a burden on the right to freedom of expression, which is protected by the European Convention on Human Rights. The libel case ended with the BCA withdrawing its suit in 2010.

== Tenets ==
- ACA's Page on Ethical Practice
- ICA Ethics.

== See also ==
- Chiropractic
