= Conscientiology =

Conscientiology is a dissident movement from Spiritism, of a pseudoscientific nature, founded by Brazilian physician and medium Waldo Vieira. It proposes the integral study of consciousness, advocating for belief in parapsychic phenomena – such as out-of-body experiences – and in the seriality of life through reincarnation. According to this perspective, consciousness (also called ego, soul, or spirit) is said to have an independent existence that transcends biological life.

Self-described as an "unconventional science," Conscientiology adopts the so-called "consciential paradigm," which values subjective approaches and personal experimentation over traditional scientific methodology. The movement emerged from Projectiology, a more applied subfield, and both share the same paradigm, often being treated as parts of a single system in their literature.

Conscientiology employs a series of scientistic neologisms, such as "ressoma" (reactivation of the soma/physical body) as a replacement for the term "reincarnation". Although some of the scarce scientific literature classifies it as a religious phenomenon – situated within the context of the New Age or post-traditional religiosities – and identifies its scientistic discourse as a continuation of Allan Kardec's theodicy, its adherents reject any religious connotation, presenting it strictly as a study and research proposal.

== Beliefs and practices ==
Conscientiology posits the existence of multiple lives, energies, and extra-physical dimensions, as well as the reality of out-of-body experiences and the evolutionary process through successive reincarnations. Its proponents claim that such concepts are not based on religious dogmas, but on alleged empirical verification obtained through personal investigation and experimentation.

In contrast to Kardecist Spiritism, which emphasizes evolution through charity and earthly atonement, Conscientiology advocates evolution through the acquisition of "cons" – the minimum unit of conscious lucidity. Its founder, Waldo Vieira, classified individuals on an evolutionary scale ranging from "pre-serenões" (less developed) to "serenões" (the highest level), encompassing dozens of intermediate categories.

Adherents adopt the so-called "principle of disbelief," summarized in the motto "Do not believe in anything, experience and draw your own conclusions." This principle reflects the valorization of a form of subjective empiricism – sometimes called "para-empiricism" – which distinguishes Conscientiology's proposal from religious traditions based on faith or authority.

Conscientiology shares with other New Age parasciences the belief in bioenergy control, the development of paranormal abilities, and the induction of consciousness projections through mental techniques. Its followers believe that anyone can learn to interact with consciousnesses from other dimensions and that leaving the body occurs naturally during deep sleep. Waldo Vieira exercised charismatic leadership until his death (or "dessoma," in the group's jargon), being recognized for his mediumistic gifts and his striking image – always dressed in white with a long white beard – which he himself claimed was a strategy to reinforce his presence and be remembered.

=== Tenepes ===
The neologism was coined by Waldo Vieira in 1966. Tenepes (an acronym for tarefa energética pessoal or "personal energetic task"), also known among Spiritists as passe para o escuro or sessão do eu sozinho ("session of the self alone"), is an assistantial technique consisting of the transmission of spiritual bioenergies for supportive purposes. The technique is individual, scheduled on a daily basis by the human being, aided and supported by extra-physical helpers (disembodied spiritual assistants, spirit guides) while in a waking state. It is directed toward living or deceased consciousnesses (those in the spiritual plane, termed extra-physical) who are ill or in need, intangible and invisible to ordinary human sight, or to projected individuals—whether near or far—who are likewise needy or unwell.

The practitioner of tenepes is called a tenepessista. This is an individual who commits for the remainder of their intraphysical life to maintain this daily practice. The tenepessista conducts their energetic sessions anonymously, in solitude, in an isolated, enclosed, silent, and dark location, without physical witnesses.
