= Keith Paora Curry =

Keith Paora Curry (sometimes Keith Paul Curry; born 1963 or 1964) was the first male nurse in New Zealand's Plunket maternal health service. On 23 May 2005, the Northland Polytechnic-trained bilingual nurse with 10 years nursing experience started work at the Plunket Society, New Zealand's century-old maternal health organisation.

In May 2010 Curry was sentenced to a year in prison for internet grooming a 14-year-old girl and a 15-year-old girl between June and September 2009. Curry was also disciplined in 2011 for giving a pregnant woman inappropriate drugs in July 2009. Neither occurred while he was working for Plunket. Curry has been struck off the nurse's register under the Health Practitioners Competence Assurance Act 2003 by the Health Practitioners Disciplinary Tribunal.

On 29 July 2014, the NZ Sensible Sentencing Trust advised the public via Facebook that Curry had changed his name to Paora Muriwai-Curry.
