= Ramatis =

Spiritual entity

Ramatis (also called Ramatís, Rama-tys and Swami Sri Rama-tys) is the name attributed by the Brazilian spiritist writer and medium Hercílio Maes to a spirit that is said to have guided the writing of his books. This spirit appeared for the first time in 1955 in the book A Vida no Planeta Marte e os Discos Voadores, which says that the planet Mars is inhabited by beings more spiritually and technologically evolved than those on Earth and that Jesus Christ had contact with beings from other worlds and that his mission would have cosmic connections. Other authors also attribute the inspiration for their books to Ramatis, such as América Paoliello Marques, Maria Margarida Liguori, Norberto Peixoto, Wagner Borges and Márcio Godinho.

Belief in Ramatis' teachings is referred to as "Ramatisism", a spiritual doctrine that synthesizes elements from Western and Eastern esotericism, Gnosticism, Hinduism, Umbanda, and Kardecist spiritism, as well as incorporating concepts from conscientiology and ufology. However, Ramatisism is not officially recognized by orthodox Kardecist spiritists and is particularly rejected by the Brazilian Spiritist Federation (FEB), which considers it divergent from Allan Kardec's codification.

== History ==
From the 1940s onwards, some Brazilian spiritist authors began to publish books that syncretized life on other planets with Kardecist spiritism, such as Chico Xavier in A Caminho da Luz (1939) and Nosso Lar (1944) and Edgard Armond in Os exilados da capela (1959).

The book A Vida no Planeta Marte e os Discos Voadores, by Hercílio Maes, dates from this period. The book is the first appearance of Ramatis, who would have dictated the text to the author, and describes a spiritual society inhabiting Mars. This society reproduces the sociocultural contradictions of Earth, such as racism, as it portrays the "black Martian" people as a primitive people. It also describes the daily life of the Martians and their spaceships, outlining the elements that would become recurrent in ufological texts.

Ramatis, Ramatís, Rama-Tys or Swami Sri Rama-tys are names attributed to the last incarnation of the spirit who would have dictated the text of the book to Hercílio Maes. He would have been a Hindu Guru who lived in the 10th century. The word Ramatis recalls the Iraqi city of Ramadi, or the fossil found in Ethiopia called Ramadis Kadaba, which means “root” in the Afar language.

In a previous incarnation he would have been the mathematician Pythagoras. He would also have lived on the mythical island of Atlantis and in Egypt, where he met Allan Kardec. Later he would have been an advisor to King Solomon, son of Moses and bodyguard of Jesus.

== Ramatisism ==
Some institutions were created with the aim of spreading Ramatis' teachings, such as Sociedade Espírita Ramatis, based in Rio de Janeiro, Associação das Fraternidades Ramatís, based in São Paulo, and Núcleo Espírita Francisca Júlia, based in Porto Alegre. His followers, the "Ramatisists", are vegetarians and have links with Gnosticism and esotericism, approaching Umbanda and, in certain aspects, Hinduism.

In Ramatisism, Ramatis coordinates the "Fraternity of the Cross and the Triangle", a "team" of spirits originating from Christianity and religious traditions of the East. The creation of such a fraternity would have taken place in outer space with the union of two fraternities of spirits: the "Fraternity of the Cross", which would act in the West, and the "Fraternity of the Triangle", which would act from the East.

Ramatisism is rejected by some Brazilian spiritists, particularly by the Brazilian Spiritist Federation. The writings of Herculano Pires are emblematic in this regard, who in his column in the Diário de São Paulo, classified Ramatis as a "mystifying spirit" and one of the "false prophets of erraticism".

== Bibliography ==
=== 1950s ===
- A vida no planeta marte e os discos voadores - Hercílio Maes (1955)
- Mensagens do astral - Hercílio Maes (1956)
- A vida além da sepultura - Hercílio Maes (1957)
- A sobrevivência do Espírito - Hercílio Maes (1958)
- Fisiologia da alma - Hercílio Maes (1959)

=== 1960s ===
- Mediumnismo - Hercílio Maes (1960)
- Mensagens do grande coração - America Paoliello Marques (1962)
- Mediunidade de cura - Hercílio Maes (1963)
- O sublime peregrino - Hercílio Maes (1964)
- Elucidações do além - Hercílio Maes (1964)
- A missão do espiritismo - Hercílio Maes (1967)
- Magia de redenção - Hercílio Maes (1967)

=== 1970s ===
- A vida humana e o Espírito imortal - Hercílio Maes (1970)
- O evangelho a luz do cosmo - Hercílio Maes (1974)
- Brasil, terra de promissão - America Paoliello Marques (1974)

=== 1980s ===
- Jesus e a Jerusalém renovada - America Paoliello Marques (1980)

=== 1990s ===
- Momentos de reflexão - Volume 1 - Maria Margarida Liguori (1990)
- Momentos de reflexão - Volume 2 - Maria Margarida Liguori (1993)
- Viagem Espiritual I - Wagner Borges (1993)
- Momentos de reflexão - Volume 3 - Maria Margarida Liguori (1995)
- Evangelho, psicologia, ioga - America Paoliello Marques (1995)
- Gotas de luz - Beatriz Bergamo (1996)
- Sob a luz do espiritismo - Hercílio Maes (1999)
- O homem e o planeta terra - Maria Margarida Liguori (1999)

=== 2000s ===
- O despertar da consciência - Maria Margarida Liguori (2000)
- As flores do oriente - Marcio Godinho (2000)
- Jornada da Luz - Maria Margarida Liguori (2001)
- Em busca da Luz Interior - Maria Margarida Liguori (2001)
- O universo humano - Marcio Godinho (2001)
- Chama Crística - Norberto Peixoto (2001)
- Samadhi - Norberto Peixoto (2002)
- Ramatis - Uma proposta de Luz - Hercílio Maes (2003)
- Evolução no Planeta Azul - Norberto Peixoto (2003)
- O astro intruso e o novo ciclo evolutivo da Terra - Hur Than de Shidha (2004)
- Jardim dos Orixás - Norberto Peixoto (2004)
- Vozes de Aruanda - Norberto Peixoto (2005)
- Viagem em torno do Eu - America Paoliello Marques (2006)
- A missão da umbanda - Norberto Peixoto (2006)
- Resgate nos umbrais - Marcio Godinho (2007)
- Travessia para a vida - Marcio Godinho (2007)
- Umbanda pé no chão - Norberto Peixoto (2009)
- Diário mediúnico - Um guia de estudos da umbanda - Norberto Peixoto (2009)

=== 2010s ===
- Mediúnidade e sacerdócio - Norberto Peixoto (2010)
- O triunfo do mestre - Norberto Peixoto (2011)
- Aos pés do Preto Velho - Norberto Peixoto (2012)

== See also ==
- Xenu
- Ashtar
- UFO religion
