= Tony Agpaoa =

Filipino practitioner of psychic surgery

Antonio C. Agpaoa (1939–1982) most well known as Tony Agpaoa was a Filipino practitioner of psychic surgery.

He worked in Manila. It was alleged that Agpaoa could remove tissue from the body of patients without making an incision. His centre in Baguio attracted "thousands of persons annually". However, magicians and skeptics were convinced his feats were the result of conjuring tricks.

In 1968, Agpaoa was arrested and charged with fraud in the United States for pretending to mend a bone in a patient's neck. Instead of facing the charges, Agpaoa "skipped his $25,000 bail and fled back to the Philippines."

According to the magician James Randi, "[i]n some cases, [Agpaoa] actually performed simple surgical services, removing cysts and draining infected areas; the rest, mostly very spectacular procedures in which his hands appeared to plunge into the body were the usual conjuring tricks." American surgeon William A. Nolen has written "According to the A.M.A. he had separated hundreds of patients from their life savings and had cured no one."

James Randi has noted that Agpaoa had his own appendix removed in a hospital in San Francisco, instead of visiting a psychic surgeon. Agpaoa also took his son to the United States when in need of medical care, but his son did not survive.
