= Eurípedes Barsanulfo =

Brazilian educator and spiritist medium (1880–1918)

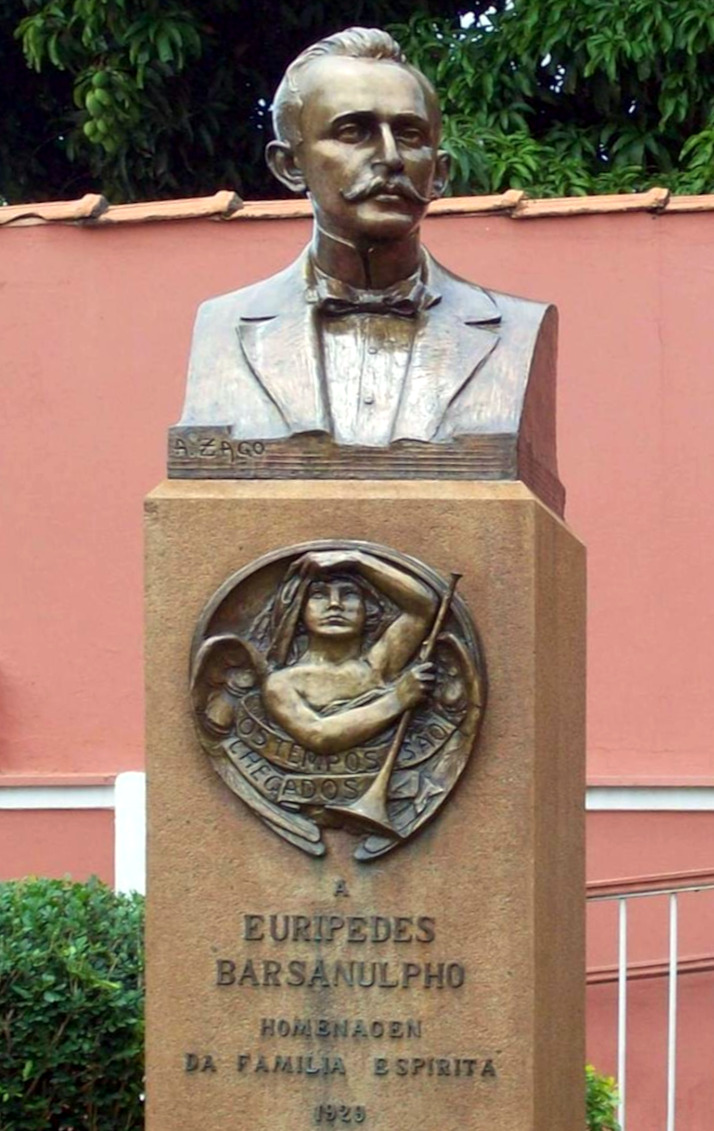
- Born: May 1, 1880; Sacramento, Minas Gerais, Brazil
- Died: November 1, 1918 (aged 38); Sacramento, Minas Gerais, Brazil
- Occupations: Educator, politician

Eurípedes Barsanulfo (May 1, 1880 – November 1, 1918) was a Brazilian educator, pharmacist, politician and spiritist medium. He is best known as the founder and first headmaster of Colégio Allan Kardec, one of the first spiritist schools in the world.
