= Benoît Jules Mure =

French homeopath and naturalist

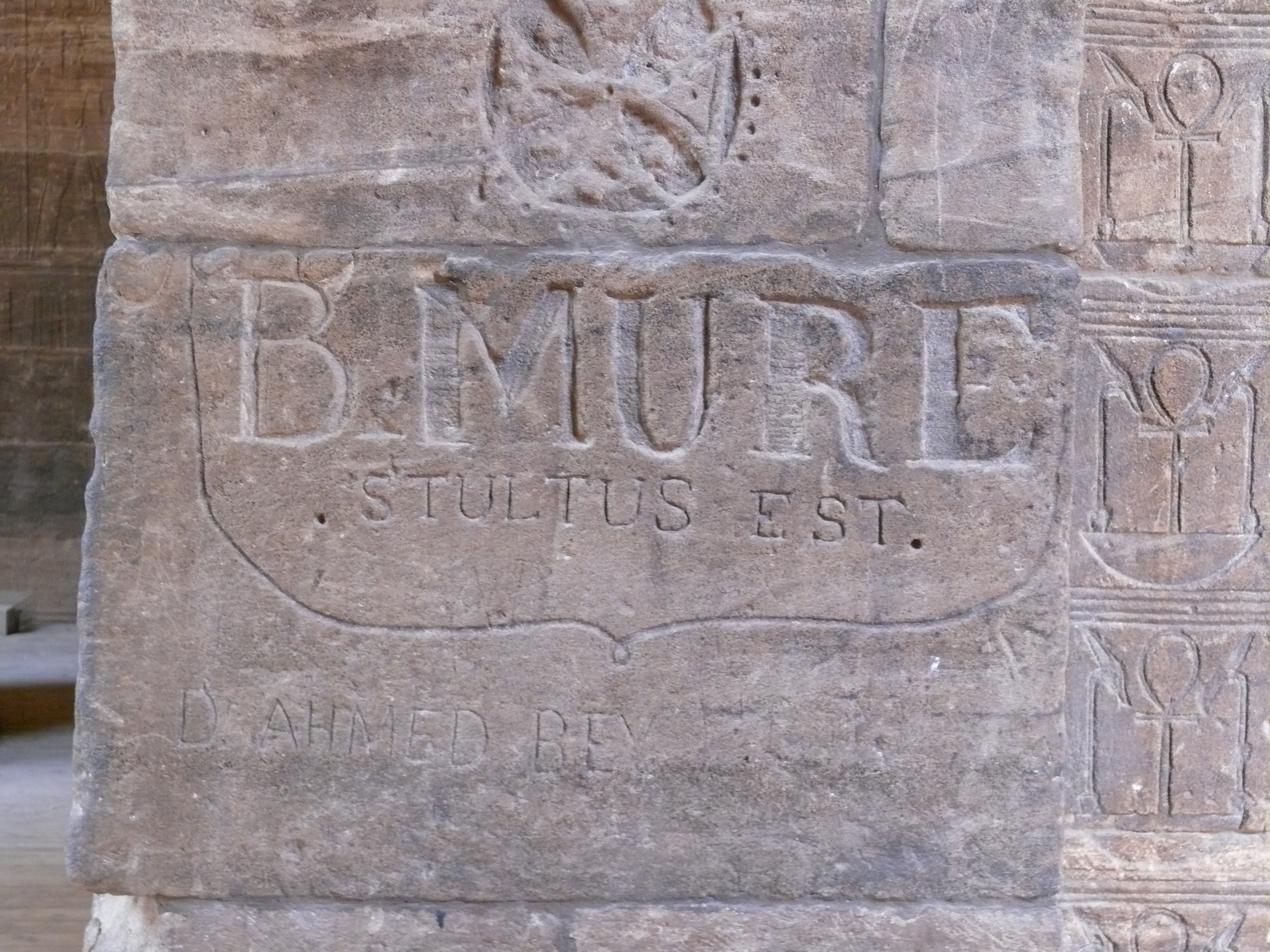
Inscription of B. Mure on the temple of Philae

Benoît Jules Mure (15 May 1809, Lyon — 4 March 1858, Cairo) was a French homeopath, naturalist, and anarcho-communist.

== Biography ==
After his studies in medicine at the University of Montpellier, which he never finished, he travelled throughout Europe, and spent time in Sicily trying to cure his tuberculosis. In his search for a cure, he became an adept of homeopathy, which he practiced in such places as Sicily and Malta, before settling in Brazil in 1840. He attempted to expand his activities in 1842, by creating an Institute in Saí, Santa Catarina (Instituto Homeopático de Saí) training locals in homeopathy, which he saw as a weapon in combatting the endemic diseases within underprivileged communities, especially the Afro-Brazilian one.

Inspired by the utopian socialism of Charles Fourier, Mure also created a Phalanstère near São Francisco do Sul (Falanstério do Saí or Colônia Industrial do Saí), which expanded to surrounding areas such as Vila da Glória (Colônia do Palmital). He received backing from Antero Ferreira de Brito and the rest of Santa Catarina's government of the period, but the project was not to survive.

He left for Rio de Janeiro in 1843, and founded the Instituto Homeopático do Brasil, serving as its president until 1848 (when he returned to Europe). In 1852, he started homeopathical activities in Cairo, Alexandria, and other areas of Egypt (including Turkiyah Sudan). He died there six years later.
