= Medical Practitioners Disciplinary Tribunal =

The Medical Practitioners Disciplinary Tribunal was a New Zealand statutory tribunal that conducted disciplinary proceedings brought against medical practitioners under Part VIII of the Medical Practitioners Act of 1995. The tribunal was superseded by the Health Practitioners Disciplinary Tribunal of New Zealand, established under the Health Practitioners Competence Assurance Act 2003 which came into effect on 18 September 2004.
