= Benjamin Teixeira de Aguiar =

Brazilian medium (born 1970)

- de Aguiar in 2026
- Born: October 26, 1970 (age 56); Aracaju, Sergipe, Brazil
- Occupations: Medium; speaker; television presenter; writer

Benjamin Teixeira de Aguiar (Portuguese pronunciation: [bẽʒaˈmĩ tejˈʃejɾɐ dʒi aɡiˈaɾ]; born October 26, 1970) is a Brazilian medium, speaker, television presenter and writer. He is the founder and leader of the Mary Christ Society, an organization with consultative status at the United Nations Economic and Social Council. He has hosted the television program Salto Quântico since 1994, broadcast on some open television networks in Brazil and also in the United States, and gives weekly lectures broadcast live on YouTube.

== Biography ==
Benjamin Teixeira de Aguiar was born on October 26, 1970 in Aracaju, in the state of Sergipe, to a mother who was also a medium. He claims that as a child, he heard the voices of spirits and saw them, mistaking them for the living. He described his supposed out-of-body experience with the spirit of his maternal great-aunt, Sister Brígida, as an "epiphany."

In 1988, he converted to Kardecist spiritism and founded the Mary Christ Society (in Portuguese: Sociedade Maria Cristo), a non-profit organization whose objective is to "offer the world an option of Christian spirituality that integrates timeless principles of wisdom with new spiritual revelations, striving for a rational-pragmatic and, as far as possible, scientific approach, as well as interdisciplinary, progressive and updated to the needs and aspirations of the human being of post-modernity, with a view to the ideals of peace, happiness and universal brotherhood." The organization has had consultative status with the United Nations Economic and Social Council since 2018. The organization owns the charity Núcleo de Educação Espiritual e Saúde Irmã Brígida, which operates in Aracaju. In 2008, he announced his departure from Kardecist spiritism, "declaring the independence and universalist character" of the organization.

His books and lectures commonly address themes related to spirituality, humanism and happiness. He defines his school of thought as Christian and unrelated to formal religious movements. He is also known for defending minority groups, especially women, black people and the LGBTQ community. He attributes the coordination of his activities to a spiritual guide named Eugênia-Aspasia, who, according to him, lived as Aspasia of Miletus and Bernadette Soubirous.

In a video published in June 2021 on his YouTube channel, he said that Lula da Silva is the reincarnation of the former emperor of Brazil, Pedro II. Playing a supernatural being addressing Pedro, de Aguiar says: "Since you thought it was unfair to be born with a silver spoon in your mouth, now you will be born into poverty. ... If you thought that having a lot of culture was unfair and that the population should resolve its own issues, you will have to rise to power through your own efforts. You will have to migrate as an exile from hunger to São Paulo. Instead of speaking twelve languages, you will barely speak one. And since you did not want to pass power to your daughter, now you will pass it to a woman [Dilma Rousseff] who also runs the risk of being deposed, as happened with Princess Isabel."

He has been openly gay since 2008. The following year, he married Wagner Mendes. He has lived in LaGrange, New York since 2020.

== Books ==
His psychographed books are attributed to Eugênia-Aspasia and other spirits.

- Teixeira de Aguiar, Benjamin (1999). Como ser feliz! - Deus como seu parceiro. Otimismo. ISBN 9788586524172.
- Teixeira de Aguiar, Benjamin (2023). Sopros de Sabedoria. Sociedade Maria Cristo. ISBN 978-6598218102.
- Teixeira de Aguiar, Benjamin (2017). Respostas modernas da sábia grega – Volume 1: Diálogos entre Eugênia-Aspásia (Espírito) e Benjamin Teixeira de Aguiar (médium). ISBN 978-8563770059.
- Teixeira de Aguiar, Benjamin (2022). Respostas modernas da sábia grega – Volume 2: Diálogos entre Eugênia-Aspásia (Espírito) e Benjamin Teixeira de Aguiar (médium). ISBN 978-6500368109.
