= Zé Arigó =

Brazilian psychic medium and healer

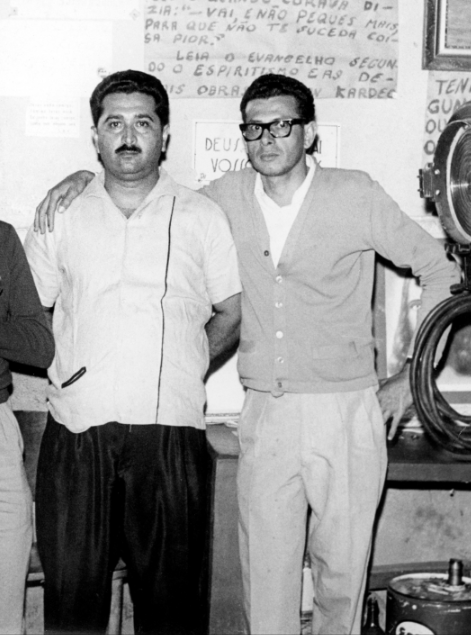
- Zé Arigó on the left and Virgílio T. on the right.
- Born: José Pedro de Freitas; 18 October 1921; Congonhas, Minas Gerais, Brazil
- Died: 11 January 1971 (aged 49); Brazil
- Known for: Popular medium Spiritist movement

Zé Arigó (pseudonym of José Pedro de Freitas 18 October 1921 – 11 January 1971) was a faith healer and a proponent of a type of medical fraud known as psychic surgery. He claimed to have performed psychic surgery with his hands or with simple kitchen utensils while in a mediumistic trance, therefore he was also known as the Surgeon of the Rusty Knife. During his operations he supposedly embodied the spirit of Dr. Adolf Fritz.

== Biography ==
Zé Arigó was born José Pedro de Freitas on a farm located 6 kilometers from Congonhas do Campo, in the state of Minas Gerais, Brazil. His family was very poor and he could only study up to the third grade of school. At the age of 14 he began working at a mine where he worked for 6 years. According to his autobiography, around 1950 he began to suffer from strong headaches, insomnia, trances, and hallucinations. One day he felt that the voice that had been pursuing him took over his body, and he had a vision of a bald man, dressed in a white apron and supervising a team of doctors and nurses in an enormous operating room. This entity identified itself as "Dr. Fritz."

After claiming to have channeled Dr. Fritz, Arigó began to perform operations using scalpels and needles. His reputation soared and spread throughout Brazil after it was alleged that he had removed a cancerous tumor from the lung of a well-known Brazilian senator. Over the next twenty years, thousands of people who mistrusted traditional medicine, or had not found help in it, came to Congonhas in search of a cure.

In 1956 Arigó was convicted of illegally practicing medicine. He was sentenced to 15 months in prison, but was pardoned by President of Brazil Juscelino Kubitschek de Oliveira. In 1962 he was arrested and held for seven months for practicing medicine without a license. However, he was allowed to continue treating people while held in jail. Arigó died in 1971 in an automobile accident.

== Critical reception ==
Óscar González-Quevedo, a prominent Catholic critic of Brazilian Spiritism, published a follow-up survey of Arigó's clients in 1973. He reported that of 836 clients surveyed, three claimed a full cure, 15.5% improved, 55.5% had no long-term change, 25.1% had no response, and 3.9% self-reported injuries. González-Quevedo's website also accuses Arigó of having mistaken albinism for leprosy, and of having misdiagnosed a benign tumor as cancerous. He suspects Arigó of obtaining the names of medicines from conversations with doctors, and of obtaining medical conditions from his day job, where he worked with the personal files of pensioners and retirees.

Magician and skeptic James Randi considered the psychic surgery of Arigó to be the result of sleight of hand trickery. In his best-known book Flim-Flam! Randi published a photograph of himself performing a knife stunt that Arigó was alleged to have performed.

Skeptical investigator Joe Nickell has written that Arigó "prescribed various potions and concoctions that obviously depended for their effectiveness on the placebo effect. His prescriptions were filled at the only pharmacy in town run by the amateur doctor's brother. By such means were Arigo's alleged 'miracle healings' actually performed."

Martin Gardner withdrew his book in protest to its publisher, Crowell-Collier, publishing John G. Fuller's book Arigo.

Alan Arkin writes of the influence his knowledge of Arigó had on a specific time in his life in his book, Out Of My Mind:(Not Quite a Memoir).

== See also ==
- "John of God"
- João Maria de Jesus
- Kardecist Spiritism
- Rubens Farias Jr.
