= Health Practitioners Disciplinary Tribunal =

Disciplinary board in New Zealand

The Health Practitioners Disciplinary Tribunal of New Zealand hears and determines disciplinary proceedings brought against health practitioners.

The Tribunal was created by section 84 Health Practitioners Competence Assurance Act 2003 and established 18 September 2004. It supersedes the Medical Practitioners Disciplinary Tribunal of New Zealand.

The Tribunal is administered by the Ministry of Health and covers a range of professions including medical professions (medical practitioners, nurses and midwives), dental professions (dentists, dental therapists, dental hygienists), pharmacists, osteopaths, and chiropractors.

== Notable people associated with the Tribunal ==
- Keith Paroa Curry—de-registered for grooming young girls.

== See also ==
- Medical Practitioners Disciplinary Tribunal
