= Waldo Vieira =

Brazilian spiritual author and physician

- Born: April 12, 1932; Monte Carmelo, Minas Gerais, Brazil
- Died: July 2, 2015 (aged 83); Foz do Iguaçu, Paraná, Brazil
- Education: University of Uberaba
- Known for: Founding Conscientiology and Projectiology

Waldo Vieira (Portuguese: [ˈvawdu viˈejɾa]) (April 12, 1932 – July 2, 2015) was a Brazilian spiritual author, medium, physician and dentist who founded the spiritual movements of Conscientiology and Projectiology.

== Biography ==
He became a Spiritist when young and graduated in medicine and dentistry. In 1955, he met the famous Brazilian medium Chico Xavier and the two co-authored several books on Spiritism, founded their Spiritist centre, practiced philanthropy and did voluntary medium work, including psychographies. Around 1966, he became a dissident Spiritist, developing his own views on the subject and stopping to work with Xavier. He then began studying themes related to parapsychology, like astral projections and altered states of consciousness. He became a member of the American Society for Psychical Research and the Society for Psychical Research, founding two fields of study he termed Conscienciologia ("Conscientiology") and Projeciologia ("Projectiology"). He published his first book on the subject in 1979, with several other publications until his death in 2015. His books were translated into English, Spanish, Italian, German and Chinese.
