= Dr. Fritz =

Hypothetical German surgeon

Adolf Fritz, generally called Dr. Fritz (Munich, ? – Estonia, 1918), was a hypothetical German surgeon whose spirit has allegedly been channeled by several Brazilian psychic surgeons, starting with Zé Arigó in the 1950s and continuing up to the present. There is no evidence that he actually existed.

== Alleged manifestations ==
In the 1950s, psychic surgeon Zé Arigó (1918–1971) claimed to be operating as a channel for the spirit of a Dr. Adolf Fritz, a German doctor who had died in World War I. Arigó became famous in Brazil and abroad, and was the subject of documentaries and books.

After Arigó's death in a car accident, two brothers, Oscar and Edivaldo Wilde, claimed to channel the spirit of Dr. Fritz. Their careers were cut short when both died in violent car crashes.

Following them was Edson Queiroz, a gynecologist. Queiroz treated hundreds of thousands of patients in the guise of Dr. Fritz, while further advancing the techniques of Arigó. He, too, met a violent death at the hand of a knife-wielding assailant.

After Queiroz's death, Dr. Fritz has been allegedly channeled by a Rubens Farias Jr. (1954– ) of São Paulo; who claims that Dr. Fritz has predicted his own violent death.

Other alleged mediums, including one Kléber Aran Ferreira da Silva have claimed to be able to channel Dr. Fritz.

Exhaustive research has found no mention of a doctor with any of those names in German records.

== See also ==
- Kardecism
