= Rubens Farias Jr. =

Brazilian practitioner associated with Dr. Fritz

Rubens Farias Jr. (born 1954) is a Brazilian practitioner who became known in the 1980s for channeling the entity referred to as Dr. Fritz. His clinic was in Bom Sucesso, a suburb of Rio de Janeiro.

Rubens was trained as an engineer.

He is not the first Brazilian to make such a claim. He follows Zé Arigó, who died in a car crash in 1971, and a number of other claimants. Farias began his activities in 1986. On a typical weekday, as many as 800 patients would line up outside the hall he used (on weekends, it served as a bar), waiting for treatment sessions which might be as short as 30 seconds. While in character as Dr. Fritz, he sometimes adopted a German accent and used expressions such as "Schnell!". Reports from observers stated that in some cases patients received homemade injections containing substances such as alcohol, iodine and turpentine, and noted that hygiene practices were minimal.

The Regional Medical Council of Rio de Janeiro has criticized his practices, describing them as unscientific and accusing him of taking advantage of the public health system.

== Sources ==
- Schemo, Diana Jean (January 12, 1996). "Rio Journal; Live, in Brazil (Again): The Reincarnated Dr. Fritz". The New York Times.
