= Baliza =

- Municipality
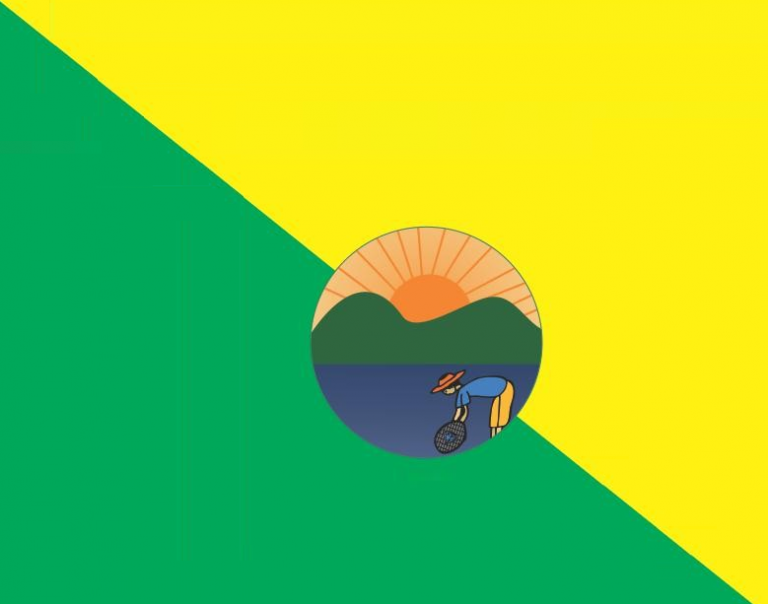
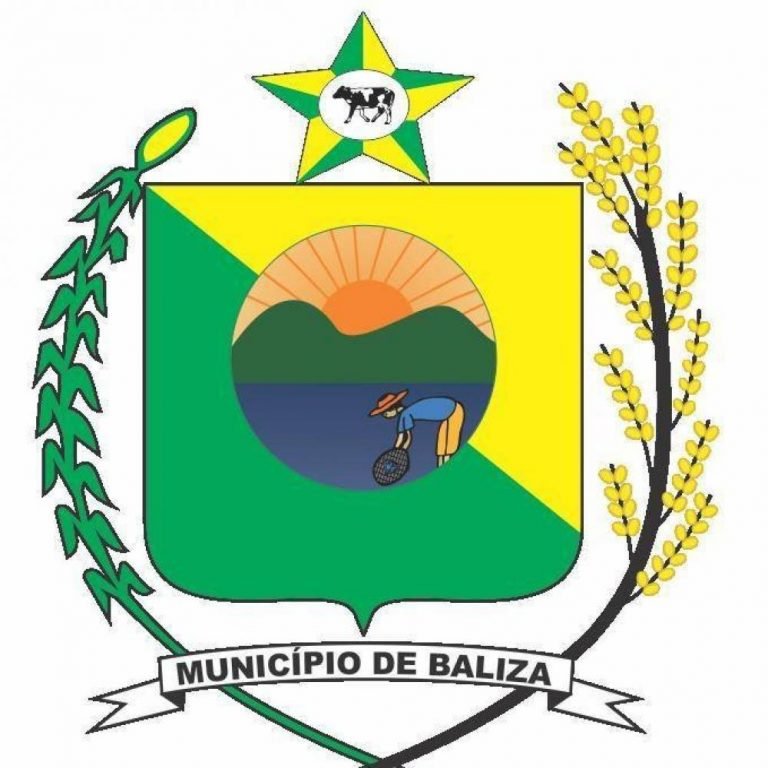
- Flag Coat of arms

- Location in Goiás state

- Location in Brazil
- Coordinates: 16°11′42″S 52°31′52″W
- Country: Brazil
- Region: Central-West
- State: Goiás
- Microregion: Aragarças Microregion

Area
  - Total: 1,783 km^{2} (688 sq mi)
- Elevation: 342 m (1,122 ft)

Population (2020)
  - Total: 5,280
  - Density: 2.96/km^{2} (7.67/sq mi)
- Time zone: UTC−3 (BRT)
- Postal code: 76250-000

Baliza is a municipality in eastern Goiás state, Brazil. The population was 5,280 (2020) in a total area of 1,783.00 km^{2}.

== Location ==
Baliza is located in the Aragarças Microregion and is on the Araguaia River, 54 kilometers southwest of Aragarças. There is a paved road with connections to Piranhas, 95 km. to the east.

The distance to the state capital, Goiânia, is 415 km. Highway connections are made by GO-060 / Trindade / Turvânia / Israelândia / Iporá / Piranhas / BR-158 / Bom Jardim de Goiás / GO-421 / GO-194.

Municipal boundaries are with:

- north and west: Mato Grosso and Aragarças
- south: Doverlândia
- east: Bom Jardim de Goiás

== Demographic and political information ==
- Population density: 1,85 inhabitants/km^{2} (2007)
- Population growth rate 1996/2007: -1,86.% (The population declined 14,34% in the period 2000/2006)
- Urban population in 2007: 1,043
- Rural population in 2007: 2,256
- Eligible voters: 2,498 (09/2007)
- City government: mayor (Humberto Robson Grossi), vice-mayor (Antenor Gonçalves Ferreira Neto), and 09 councilpersons

== Economy ==
The main economic activities are cattle raising, agriculture, tourism, commerce (18 units), wood extraction and processing, and small transformation industries. Public administration is one of the largest employers. There is also a substantial informal economy.

There were 62,000 head of cattle in 2007. The main agricultural products were bananas, charcoal, hard woods, rice (500 ha.), manioc, corn (1,000 ha.), and soybeans (2,5800 ha.).

There were no financial institutions registered in 2007.

Agricultural data 2006

- Number of farms: 776
- Total area: 132,815 ha.
- Area of permanent crops: 4,848 ha. (bananas)
- Area of perennial crops: 6,877 ha. (soybeans, corn, rice)
- Area of natural pasture: 66,797 ha.
- Area of woodland and forests: 44,638 ha.
- Cattle herd: 62,000
- Number of workers: 1,850
- Number of farms with tractors: 73
- Number of tractors: 98

== Health and education ==
- Infant mortality in 2000: 19.78
- Literacy rate in 2000: 79.5
- Hospitals: none in 2007
- Schools: 4 with 823 students in 2006

Baliza is rated 0.715 on the United Nations Human Development Index and is ranked 186 out of 242 municipalities in Goiás. Nationally it is ranked 2,727 out of 5,507 municipalities.

== History ==
The settlement of this region began in 1924 with the discovery of diamonds along the banks of the João Velho River by two prospectors, Cosme and Borges. Soon many prospectors arrived with their families and a settlement began with the name of "Baliza", the name of a large rock in the middle of the Araguaia River. In 1930 the town was raised to the category of district in the municipality of Rio Bonito, now called Caiapônia. In 1936 it became a municipality. Soon the diamonds ran out and the families emigrated to other regions. Baliza was almost totally abandoned with its urban population declining to 883 in the 1980 census.

== See also ==
- List of municipalities in Goiás
- Microregions of Goiás
