= Piranhas, Goiás =

Piranhas
- Municipality
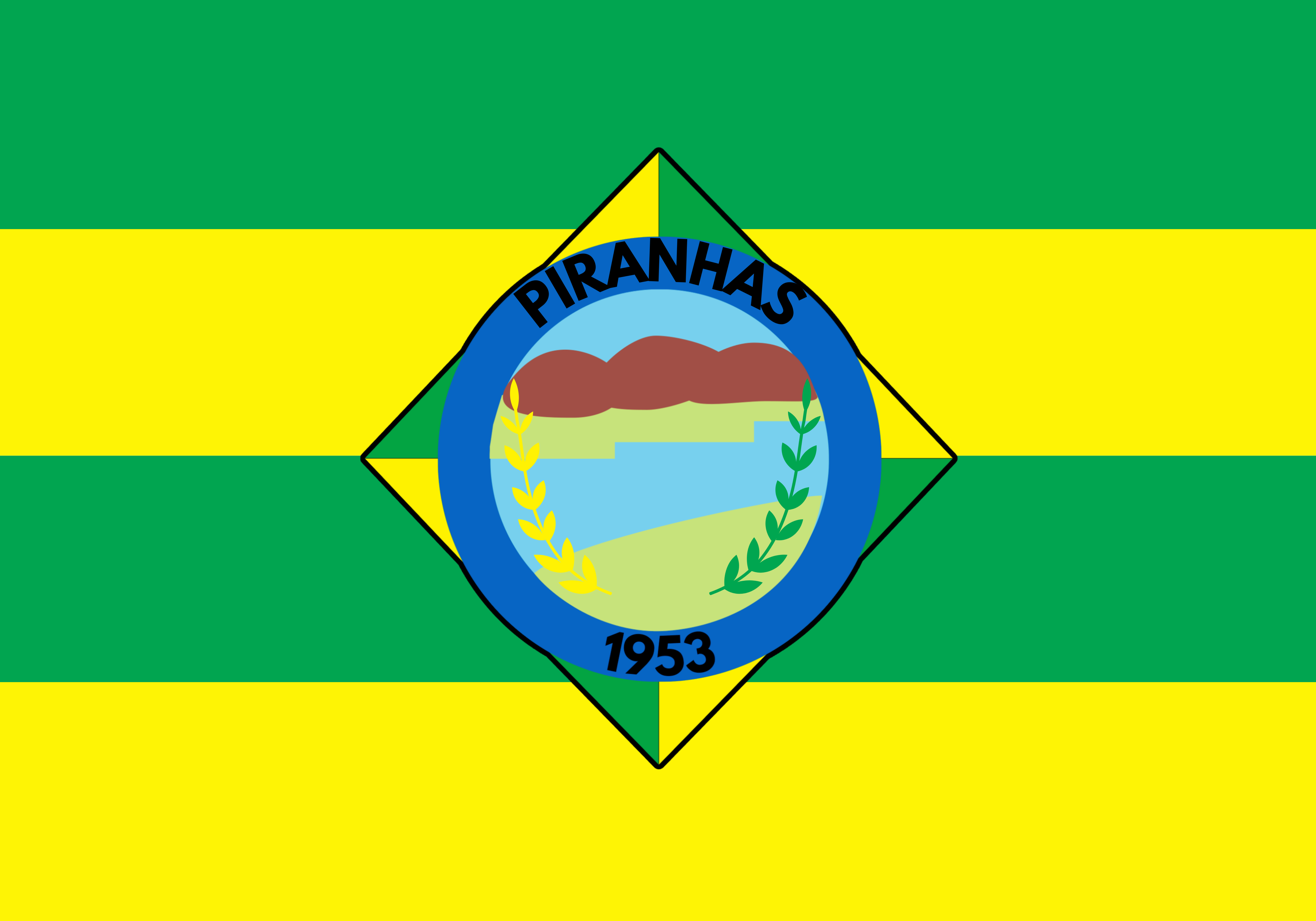
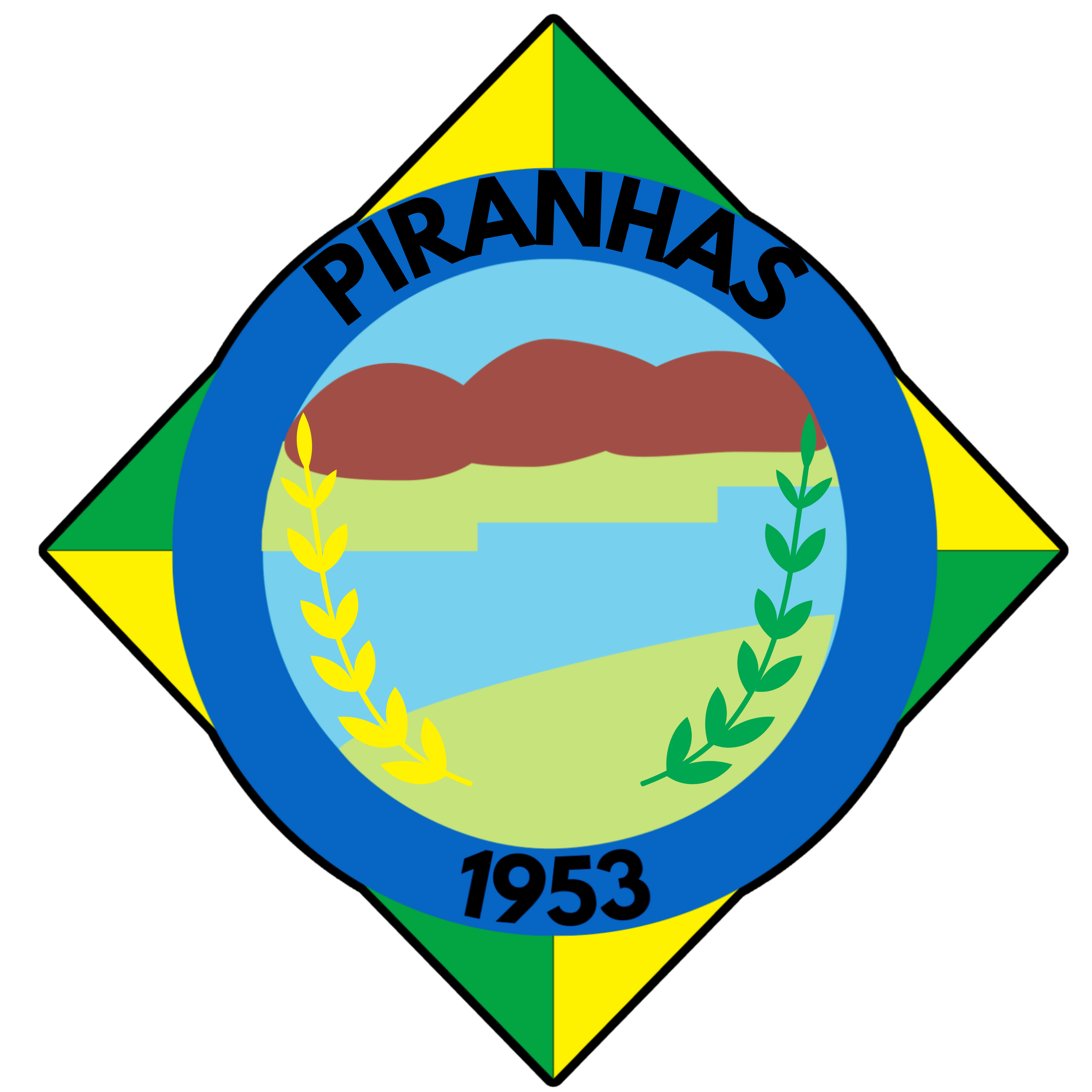
- Flag Coat of arms

- Location in Goiás state

- Location in Brazil
- Coordinates: 16°24′59″S 51°48′57″W
- Country: Brazil
- Region: Central-West
- State: Goiás
- Microregion: Aragarças Microregion

Area
  - Total: 2,047 km^{2} (790 sq mi)
- Elevation: 389 m (1,276 ft)

Population (2020)
  - Total: 10,272
  - Density: 5.018/km^{2} (13.00/sq mi)
- Time zone: UTC−3 (BRT)
- Postal code: 76230-000

Piranhas is a municipality in western Goiás state, Brazil. It is a large producer of milk and has a large herd of cattle.

== Location ==
Piranhas is located on the Piranhas River and is served by highways: BR-158, which connects Jataí to Aragarças; and GO-060, which connects Piranhas to Iporá.

The distance to the state capital, Goiânia, is 321 km. Highway connections are made by GO-060 / Trindade / Nazário / São Luís de Montes Belos / Israelândia / Iporá / Arenópolis.

Municipal boundaries are with:

- north and west: Bom Jardim de Goiás
- east: Arenópolis
- south: Palestina de Goiás and Doverlândia

== Demographic Information ==
The population density was 5.44 inhabitants/km^{2} in 2007. There were 8,872 urban dwellers and 2,267 rural dwellers. The population has declined by about 4,000 people since 1980.

== Economic Information ==
The economy is based on mining, agriculture, cattle raising, services, public administration, and small transformation industries. In 2007 there were 19 small transformation industries and 128 commercial units. There were three banks: Banco do Brasil S.A. - BRADESCO S.A. - Banco Itaú S.A. There were two dairies: Maroca Indústria de Laticínios. - Lactosul Ind. de Laticínios Ltda (May 2006)

The main crops in 2006 were pineapple, rice, bananas, beans, manioc, soybeans, and corn. The cattle herd was large with 192,000 head in 2006.

Agricultural data 2006

- Number of farms: 790
- Total area: 207,550 ha.
- Area of permanent crops: 162 ha. (bananas and pineapple)
- Area of perennial crops: 1,421 ha. (soybeans, corn, rice)
- Area of natural pasture: 152,180 ha.
- Area of woodland and forests: 45,753 ha.
- Cattle herd: 192,000
- Number of workers: 1,800
- Number of farms with tractors: 142
- Number of tractors: 179 IBGE

== Education and Health ==
In 2006 there were 12 schools, 103 classrooms, 194 teachers, and 3,602 students. In 2007 there were 3 hospitals with 87 beds.

- Higher education: Campus of the State University of Goiás
- Adult literacy rate: 84.8% (2000) (national average was 86.4%)
- Infant mortality rate: 28.24 (2000) (national average was 33.0).

== Tourism ==
There is potential for eco-tourism with conditions for hiking, going down rapids, and other sports activities practiced near nature. The São Domingos river is ideal for canoeing, and descending on rafts or tire-tubes. Hikers can walk through virgin forests, which have unexplored caves.

- Municipal Human Development Index: 0.773
- Ranking in state: 118/245
- National ranking: 2249/5507

== History ==
Settlement began in 1948 when engineers and workers building the road between Caiapônia and Aragarças arrived in the region and set up camp on the banks of the Piranhas River. A settlement was created with the name of Piranhas, after the river. In 1952 it became a district of Caiapônia, receiving its municipal autonomy in 1953.

== See also ==
- List of municipalities in Goiás
- Microregions of Goiás
