= Palestina de Goiás =

- Municipality
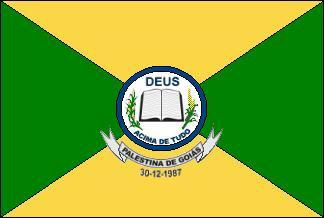
- Flag

- Location in Goiás state

- Location in Brazil
- Coordinates: 16°44′58″S 51°30′41″W
- Country: Brazil
- Region: Central-West
- State: Goiás
- Microregion: Sudoeste de Goiás

Area
  - Total: 1,320.6 km^{2} (509.9 sq mi)
- Elevation: 741 m (2,431 ft)

Population (2010)
  - Total: 3,371
  - Density: 2.553/km^{2} (6.611/sq mi)
- Time zone: UTC−3 (BRT)
- Postal code: 75845-000

Palestina de Goiás is a municipality in eastern Goiás state, Brazil.

== Location ==
Palestina is located in the Sudoeste de Goiás Microregion between the Rio Bonito and the Rio Caiapó. There are paved road connections linking the town to Jataí in the south and to Iporá in the northeast. The Serra do Caiapó lies to the south of the region.

The distance to the state capital, Goiânia, is 293 km. Highway connections are made by GO-060 / Trindade / Nazário / Turvânia / Firminópolis / São Luís de Montes Belos / Israelândia / Iporá / GO-221.

Municipal boundaries are with:

- north: Piranhas and Arenópolis
- south and west: Caiapônia
- east: Paraúna

== Political information ==
In January 2005 the Mayor was Bacatela . There were 9 members on the city council and there were 2,882 eligible voters in 2007. In October 2008 lawyer Eduardo Talvani Lima Couto, from the PSC party, was elected as mayor with difference of only 19 votes from the other candidate and taking control over the administration in January 2009.

== Demographic information ==
In 2007 the population density was 2.44 inhabitants/km^{2}. In 2007 there were 2,039 people living in the urban area and 1,190 people living in the rural area. The population decreased -0,34% from 2000 to 2007.

== Economic information ==
The economy is based on services, public employment, cattle raising, and agriculture. In 2007 there were 4 industrial establishments and 19 commercial establishments. There were no financial institutions. There were 408 agricultural units in 2006 with 107,247 hectares. Of this land, 5,579 hectares were planted, 76,000 were pasture land, and 23,000 were woodland. Around 1,200 people were employed in the agricultural sector.

In 2006 there were 95,000 head of cattle. The main agricultural products were rice, bananas, beans, corn, and soybeans (3,000 hectares).

== Health and education ==
In 2007 there were no hospitals and only 1 ambulatory health clinic. In 2000 the infant mortality rate was 17,12—below the national average of 33.0.

In 2006 the school system had 3 schools with 1,019 students. In 2000 the adult literacy rate was 83.2%--below the national average of 86.4%.

== Ranking on the Municipal Human Development Index ==
- MHDI: 0.739
- Ranking in state: 109 out of 242 municipalities
- Ranking in country: 2,167 out of 5,507 municipalities

Data are from 2000

For the complete list see Frigoletto.com

== See also ==
- List of municipalities in Goiás
- Microregions of Goiás
