= Doverlândia =

- Municipality
- Flag Coat of arms

- Location in Goiás state

- Location in Brazil
- Coordinates: 16°43′29″S 52°18′28″W
- Country: Brazil
- Region: Central-West
- State: Goiás
- Microregion: Sudoeste de Goiás

Area
  - Total: 3,207.5 km^{2} (1,238.4 sq mi)
- Elevation: 509 m (1,670 ft)

Population (2020)
  - Total: 7,247
  - Density: 2.259/km^{2} (5.852/sq mi)
- Time zone: UTC−3 (BRT)
- Postal code: 75855-000

Doverlândia is a city and municipality in western Goiás state, Brazil. It is a large producer of cattle and soybeans.

== Location and Highway Connections ==
Doverlândia is in the Southwest Goiás Microregion in the far eastern section of the state and is relatively isolated from major population centers. Surrounding municipalities are: Mineiros and Caiapônia. To the east lies the Araguaia River and the boundary with the state of Mato Grosso.

Connecting highways from Goiânia are GO-060 / Trindade / Nazário / Firminópolis / Israelândia / Iporá / GO-221 / Palestina de Goiás / Caiapônia.

== History ==
The municipality began in 1949 with the settlement of Rio do Peixe. Manuel Ribeiro Campos arrived with his family, bought lands and built his house along the banks of this river. The first roads were opened by Campos himself using an axe and machete. Campos and his workers built a landing strip in the jungle and the first plane landed in 1951. In 1958 Dovercindo Borges arrived becoming the local political leader. At this time Rio do Peixe belonged to the municipality of Caiapônia. In 1964 the first bulldozer arrived and the dense vegetation began to be opened up for farmland and cattle pastures. In 1969 Rio do Peixe was elevated to district status and the name was changed to Doverlândia, in homage to its founder Dovercindo Borges. In 1982 it became an independent municipality.

== Demographics ==
- Population growth rate 2000/2007: -0.36%
- Population density || 2.60 inhabitants/km^{2}
- Urban population || 5.073
- Rural population || 3,271

=== Economy ===
The economy is based on cattle raising and agriculture, especially corn, rice, and soybeans. In 2006 there were 931 agricultural units with a total of 342,000 hectares. Of this total 326 were farms with a total of 9,878 hectares in cropland. Pasture made up 248,000 hectares and there were 77,000 hectares left in woods and forests.

Economic data

- Industrial units: 13 (06/2007)
- Retail units: 138 (08/2007)
- Banking institutions: Banco do Brasil S.A. (08/2007)
- Dairies: Laticínios Catupiry Ltda. (22/05/2006)
- Cattle: 245,000 head (2006)
- Rice: 2,000 hectares
- Corn: 1,000 hectares
- Soybeans: 8,000 hectares

Data are from IBGE

=== Education and health ===
- Literacy rate: 82.1%
- Infant mortality rate: 28.66 in 1,000 live births
- Schools: 11 (2006) with 2,315 students
- Hospitals: 01 (2007) with 24 beds
- Walk-in public health clinics: 03
- MHDI: 0.710
- State ranking: 198 (out of 242 municipalities in 2000)
- National ranking: 2,831 (out of 5,507 municipalities in 2000)

== See also ==
- List of municipalities in Goiás
- Microregions of Goiás
