= Aragarças =

- Municipality
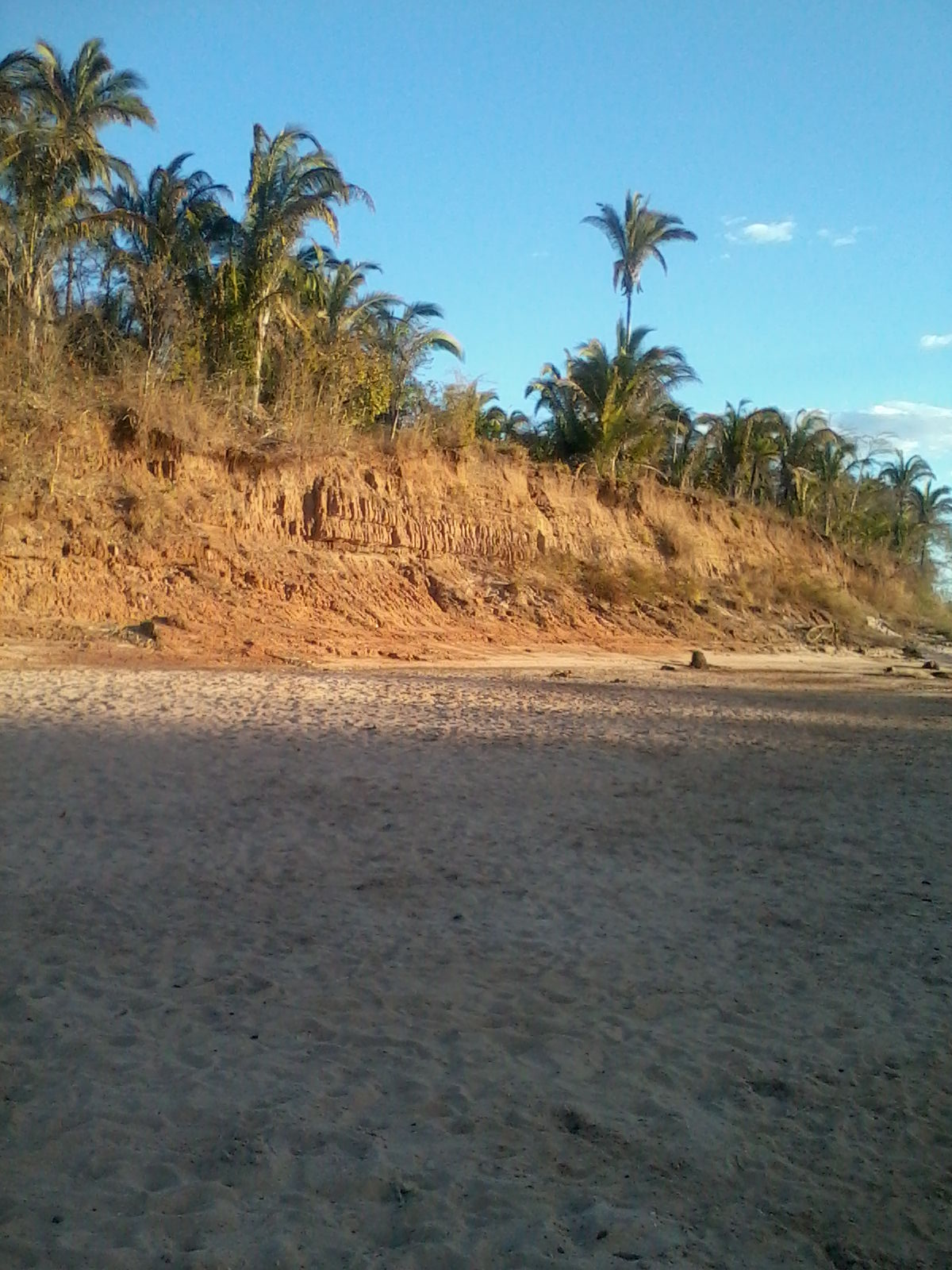

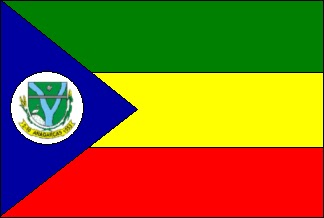
- Flag

- Location in Goiás state

- Location in Brazil
- Coordinates: 15°54′09″S 52°14′31″W
- Country: Brazil
- Region: Central-West
- State: Goiás
- Microregion: Aragarças Microregion

Area
  - Total: 660.6 km^{2} (255.1 sq mi)
- Elevation: 310 m (1,020 ft)

Population (2020)
  - Total: 20,273
  - Density: 30.69/km^{2} (79.48/sq mi)
- Time zone: UTC−3 (BRT)
- Postal code: 76240-000

Aragarças is a municipality in southwest Goiás state, Brazil.

== Location ==
Aragarças is the most important town in the Aragarças Microregion. It is 410 km from the state capital, Goiânia on the confluence of two important rivers, the Garças and the Araguaia River.

Highway connections with Goiânia are made by GO-060 / Trindade / Turvânia / Israelândia / Iporá / Piranhas / BR-158 / Bom Jardim de Goiás.

Municipal boundaries are with:

- North and Northwest: Araguaia River
- South and West: Baliza and Bom Jardim de Goiás
- East: Montes Claros de Goiás and Bom Jardim de Goiás

It is separated from Barra do Garças in Mato Grosso by a bridge over the Araguaia River. The main highway connections are made by BR-158, BR-70, GO-194 and GO-060.

== Demographic and Political Data ==
- Population density: 24.11 inhabitants/km^{2} (2007)
- Population growth rate 2000/2007: 0.48.%
- Urban population in 2007: 16,776
- Rural population in 2007: 380
- Eligible voters: 12,305 (12/2007)
- City government in 2005: mayor (Marcos Antônio de Oliveira), vice-mayor (Osmar Rezende), and 09 councilmembers

== Transport ==
Aragarças Airport is a small airfield that serves mainly private aircraft with one single paved runway. The airfield has no terminal building with just a small hangar. The closest airport is Barra do Garcas Airport SBBW.

The municipality is served by three major roads:

- Federal Highway 70
- Goiás State Highway GO-194
- Federal Highway 158

== Economy ==
The main economic activities are cattle raising, commerce, and tourism. The population was employed in transformation industries, commerce (174 units), hotels and restaurants, and public administration (297 workers). The informal economy is also very strong. In recent years tourism has become one of the main sources of income, driven by the natural environment of the area. It is one of the most visited touristic points in the state, especially in the months of June and July, when enormous sandbanks are exposed on the Araguaia River, creating kilometers of pristine beaches. The Araguaia is a sought after location for sport fishing.

There were 26,500 cattle registered in 2006. The main agricultural products were rice and corn. There was also production of charcoal and hardwoods.

== Health and education ==
- infant mortality rate: 24.58
- literacy rate: 88.2% (2000)
- health establishments: 06
- hospitals: 01 (2007)
- hospital beds: 31
- schools: 17 (2006)
- students: 5,538
- HDI-M: 0.748
- State ranking: 81 (out of 242 municipalities)
- National ranking: 1,941 (out of 5,507 municipalities)

== History ==
The first penetration into the region now occupied by Aragarças occurred in 1872 by a group of prospectors seeking diamonds from Mato Grosso. They were massacred by the Bororó Indians who lived in the area. In 1933 the news that an enormous diamond had been discovered brought droves of prospectors. In the 1950s Aragarça, the name given to the settlement and made up of the name of the Araguaia River and its tributary the Garças, was the center of the government campaign to open up the east of Mato Grosso. A hotel was built to house visitors and a residential area to house the government workers involved in the project. Other improvements were the building of an airstrip and a concrete bridge over the Araguaia River. Araguaia became a district of Baliza in 1951 and a municipality in 1953.

== Climate ==
Aragarças experiences a tropical savanna climate (Köppen: Aw) with hot temperatures and distinct wet and dry seasons.

The city experiences a wet season from October to March. The dry season extends from May to September.

Aragarças has hot conditions throughout the year. September and October, before the wet season, are the hottest months, with average highs around 36 °C (97 °F).

Climate data for Aragarças (1991–2020)
Month	Jan	Feb	Mar	Apr	May	Jun	Jul	Aug	Sep	Oct	Nov	Dec	Year
Mean daily maximum °C (°F)	31.9 (89.4)	32.1 (89.8)	32.5 (90.5)	33.0 (91.4)	32.5 (90.5)	32.5 (90.5)	33.1 (91.6)	35.4 (95.7)	36.5 (97.7)	35.4 (95.7)	33.0 (91.4)	32.2 (90.0)	33.3 (91.9)
Daily mean °C (°F)	26.2 (79.2)	26.2 (79.2)	26.3 (79.3)	26.4 (79.5)	24.8 (76.6)	23.6 (74.5)	23.4 (74.1)	25.7 (78.3)	28.0 (82.4)	28.3 (82.9)	26.8 (80.2)	26.3 (79.3)	26.0 (78.8)
Mean daily minimum °C (°F)	22.1 (71.8)	22.1 (71.8)	22.0 (71.6)	21.4 (70.5)	18.7 (65.7)	16.4 (61.5)	15.5 (59.9)	17.3 (63.1)	20.6 (69.1)	22.4 (72.3)	22.2 (72.0)	22.1 (71.8)	20.2 (68.4)
Average precipitation mm (inches)	298.7 (11.76)	213.2 (8.39)	207.4 (8.17)	88.5 (3.48)	21.4 (0.84)	10.7 (0.42)	5.5 (0.22)	6.9 (0.27)	32.8 (1.29)	118.1 (4.65)	198.4 (7.81)	249.3 (9.81)	1,450.9 (57.12)
Average precipitation days (≥ 1.0 mm)	18.2	14.9	13.4	6.6	1.7	0.7	0.5	0.6	3.5	8.3	13.4	17.4	99.2
Average relative humidity (%)	79.4	78.9	78.7	74.5	69.9	64.7	57.3	48.7	50.8	62.4	74.2	78.6	68.2
Average dew point °C (°F)	22.7 (72.9)	22.7 (72.9)	22.8 (73.0)	22.2 (72.0)	19.9 (67.8)	17.7 (63.9)	15.9 (60.6)	15.5 (59.9)	17.8 (64.0)	20.9 (69.6)	22.2 (72.0)	22.7 (72.9)	20.3 (68.5)
Mean monthly sunshine hours	152.3	149.6	184.8	220.4	250.4	254.5	274.8	275.8	209.6	189.6	155.7	141.7	2,459.2
Source: NOAA

== See also ==
- List of municipalities in Goiás
