= Caiapônia =

Coordinates: 16°57′07″S 51°48′22″W

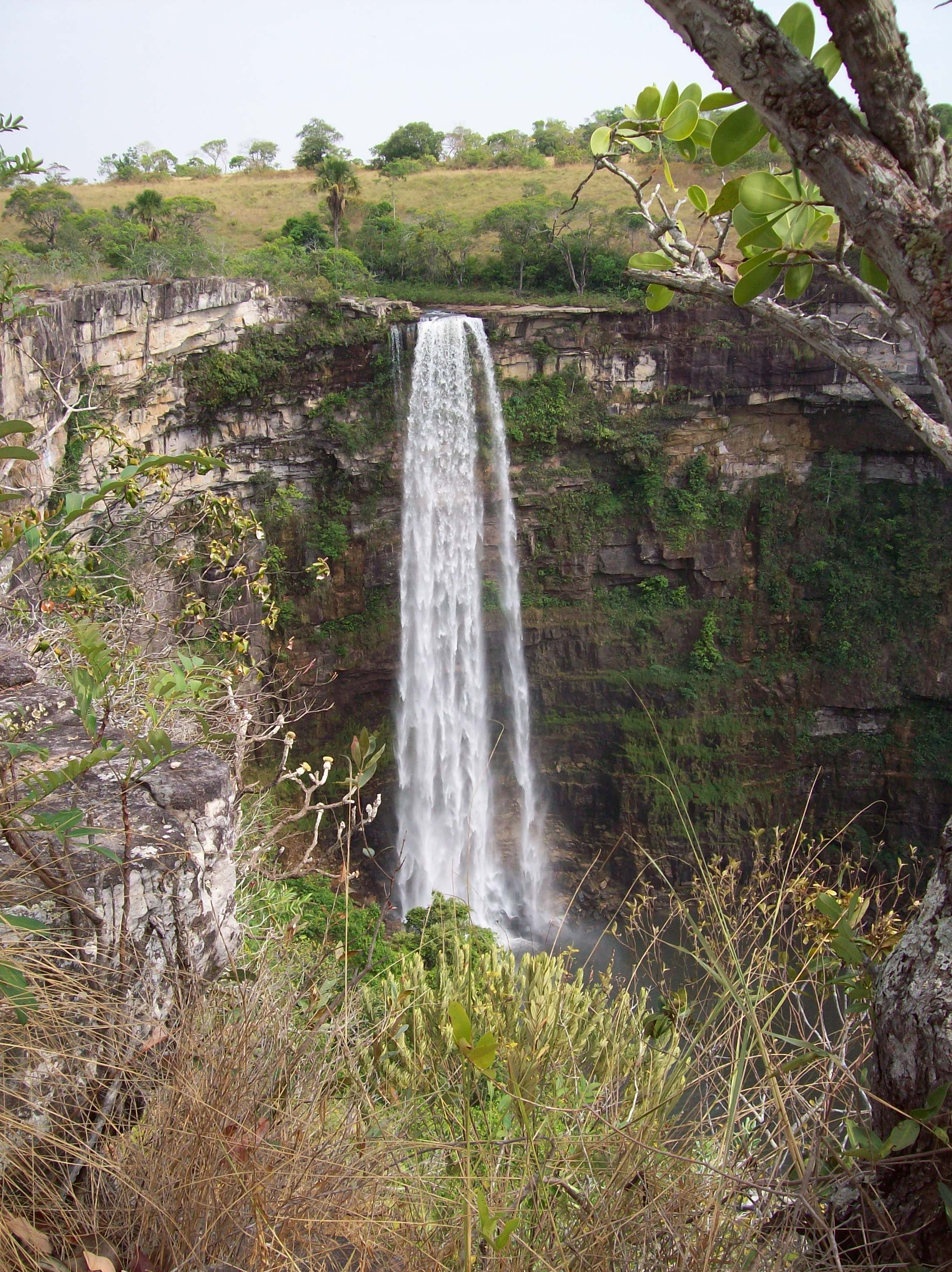

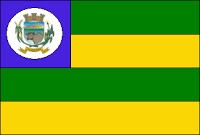
- Flag

- Country: Brazil
- State: Goiás
- Municipality: Aporé
- Incorporated: 1873

Government
  - Mayor: Caio Lima
  - Vice Mayor: Carmem Lúcia

Area
  - Total: 8,682 km^{2} (3,352 sq mi)
- Elevation: 692 m (2,270 ft)

Population (2020)
  - Total: 19,107
  - Density: 1.82/km^{2} (4.7/sq mi)
- Time zone: UTC−3 (BRT)
- Postal code: 75850-000

Caiapônia is a municipality in south-central Goiás state, Brazil. It has the third largest cattle herd in the state and is a major producer of grains. The town is also known as Torres Do Rio Bonito or just Rio Bonito.

== History ==
Caiapônia derives its name from the Caiapó Indians who had fought wars with settlers until the end of the nineteenth century. The first church, Espírito Santo, was built in 1845 and by 1850 the settlement had several houses and was known as Torres do Rio Bonito. In 1855 its status as povoado passed to distrito and it became part of the municipality of Rio Verde. In 1871 Torres do Rio Bonito was raised to municipal status, the name being shortened to Rio Bonito in 1911. Finally in 1943 the name was changed to Caiapônia, to honor the Indians who had lived in the area.

== Geography ==
Caiapônia is located 334 kilometres (208 mi) southwest of Goiânia following GO-221. The main highways of access are GO-060 / Trindade, Goiás / Nazário / Firminópolis / Israelândia / Iporá / GO-221 /. It is part of the Sudoeste de Goiás Microregion and has municipal boundaries with Baliza, Bom Jardim de Goiás, Montividiu, Rio Verde, Ivolândia, Palestina de Goiás, Doverlândia and Jataí.

Known as the city of the Thousand Waterfalls, the municipality has several rivers: Caiapó, Bonito, Paraíso, Peixe, Piranhas, Verdão, Claro and Doce. There are also many waterfalls: Torre, Freira, Gigante Adormedido, Cachoeira do Pantano, Cachoeira do Vale, Cachoeira do Salomão, and Cachoeira da Abóbora among others. Cachoeira do Vale is located 12 kilometres (7.5 mi) from the city, with a lake suitable for swimming. Cachoeira de São Domingos is formed by the Piranhas River and has a fall of 40 meters (130 ft). The highest waterfall, though, is Cachoeira do Salomão with a fall of 80 meters (260 ft). Access is difficult but once there one can see transparent waters protected by thick tropical vegetation, containing orchids of several colors.

Villages in the area include Boa Vista and Planalto Verde.

== Demographics (2007) ==
- Population density in 2007: 1.82 inhabitants/km^{2}
- Population growth rate 1996/2007: 0.93% 1996/2007
- Total population in 2007: 15,747
- Total population in 1980: 28,632
- Urban population in 2007: 11,493
- Rural population in 2007: 4,254 (the rural population was 15,677 in 1980)
- Population change: the population decreased around 13,000 since 1980.

== Economy ==
The economy is based on cattle-raising, with the third largest herd in the state of Goiás (415,000 head in 2006) and large plantations of corn, soybeans, and rice. Milk production is also very important.

Its numerous lakes, rivers and waterfalls provide attractions for tourists.

=== Economic data (2007) ===
- Industrial establishments: 18
- Financial Institutions in 2007: Banco do Brasil S.A., Banco Itaú S.A.
- Retail establishments in 2007: 159 (Sepin 2007)

=== Motor vehicles ===
- Automobiles: 894 (2007)
- Pickup trucks: 364
- Number of inhabitants per motor vehicle: 11 (IBGE 2007)

=== Main agricultural products in hectares (2006) ===
- cotton: 4,000
- pineapple: 45
- rice: 4,000
- banana: 10
- coffee: 6
- sugarcane: 35
- beans: 1,450
- sunflower: 200
- corn: 15,000
- soybeans: 55,000
- sorghum: 2,600 (Sepin 2006)

=== Farm data in hectares (2006) ===
- Number of farms: 1,275
- Total area: 560,749
- Area of permanent crops: 3,316
- Area of perennial crops: 33,761
- Area of natural pasture: 366,896
- Persons dependent on farming: 3,450

== Health and education ==
The health sector was represented by 03 hospitals with 48 beds (2007). In 2006 there were 18 schools with 4,125 students. There was no higher education as of 2007.

- Infant mortality in 2000: 18.25
- Literacy rate: 82.4 (2000)
- Ranking on the Municipal Human Development Index: 0.735
- State ranking: 127 (out of 242 municipalities)
- National ranking: 2,310 (out of 5,507 municipalities)

== See also ==
- List of municipalities in Goiás
- Microregions of Goiás
