= Ivolândia =

- Municipality
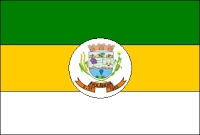
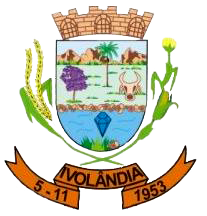
- Flag Coat of arms

- Location in Goiás state

- Location in Brazil
- Coordinates: 16°36′48″S 50°46′40″W
- Country: Brazil
- Region: Central-West
- State: Goiás
- Microregion: Iporá Microregion

Area
  - Total: 1,262.837 km^{2} (487.584 sq mi)
- Elevation: 637 m (2,090 ft)

Population (2020)
  - Total: 2,334
  - Density: 1.848/km^{2} (4.787/sq mi)
- Time zone: UTC−3 (BRT)
- Postal code: 76130-000

Ivolândia is a municipality in eastern Goiás state, Brazil. The population was 2,718 (2007) in a total area of 1,262.8 km^{2} (487.6 sq mi) (10/10/2002).

== Location ==
- Distance to regional center (Iporá): 56 km.
- Highway connections: state highway BR-069 west from Goiânia, through Trindade, São Luís de Montes Belos, GO-444 / Moiporá. For the complete list for Goiás see Distancias Rodoviarias Seplan

Neighboring municipalities: Iporá, Amorinópolis, Cachoeira de Goiás, Palestina de Goiás, Caiapônia, Moiporá, Arenópolis, and Paraúna.

Districts, villages, and hamlets

- District: Campolândia.
- Hamlets: Estrela do Oriente and Petrolandia.

== Demographics ==
- Population growth rate 1996/2007: -1.31%
- Population in 1980: 4,269
- Population in 2007: 2,718
- Urban population in 2007: 1,481
- Rural population in 2007: 1,237 (Sepin)

== The economy ==
The economy is based on services, cattle, milk products, and limited agriculture. There was 01 dairy—UNILAT - Indústria de Laticínios Ltda (07/06/2006). There were no bank branches in 2007. The cattle here had 93,000 head in 2006. The main agricultural crops were corn, manioc, rice, soybeans, and sugarcane.

- GDP (PIB) (R$1,000.00): 20,240 (2005)
- GDP per capita (R$1.00): 6,796 (2005)

Motor vehicles

- Automobiles: 125
- Pickup trucks: 37
- Number of inhabitants per motor vehicle: 17

Agricultural data 2006

- Farms: 488
- Total area: 104,195 ha.
- Area of permanent crops: 39 ha.
- Area of perennial crops: 124 ha.
- Area of natural pasture: 76,909 ha.
- Area of woodland and forests: 25,015 ha.
- Persons dependent on farming: 1,600
- Farms with tractors: 83
- Number of tractors: 108
- Cattle herd: 93,000 head IBGE

== Education and Health ==
- Schools in activity: 4
- Classrooms: 18
- Teachers: 29
- Total Students: 610
- Literacy Rate: 81.6%
- Hospitals: 1
- Beds: 16
- Public health clinics: 3
- Infant mortality rate: 24.39 (in 1,000 live births)
- Municipal Human Development Index: 0.721
- State ranking: 169 (out of 242 municipalities in 2000)
- National ranking: 2,601 (out of 5,507 municipalities in 2000)

== History ==
The opening up of these lands began in 1939 when several families from Minas Gerais and Bahia settled along the banks of the Rio Claro and the Córrego Encantado seeking gold and diamonds. In 1944 a dirt road was opened and a village was formed called Boa Vista, because of the location on the plateau between Iporá and Cachoeira de Goiás. In 1947 the first church dedicated to Nossa Senhora da Abadia was built and one year later came the first primary school. In 1952 Boa Vista was made a district of Aurilândia and the name was changed to Ivolândia, in homage to the pioneer Ivo Moreira Neves. In 1953 it was raised to municipal status.

== See also ==
- List of municipalities in Goiás
- Microregions of Goiás
