= Bom Jardim de Goiás =

- Municipality
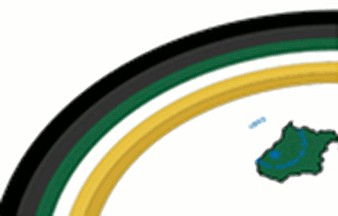
- Flag

- Location in Goiás state

- Location in Brazil
- Coordinates: 16°12′06″S 52°10′13″W
- Country: Brazil
- Region: Central-West
- State: Goiás
- Microregion: Aragarças Microregion

Area
  - Total: 1,557 km^{2} (601 sq mi)
- Elevation: 386 m (1,266 ft)

Population (2020)
  - Total: 8,869
  - Density: 5.696/km^{2} (14.75/sq mi)
- Time zone: UTC−3 (BRT)
- Postal code: 73245-000

Bom Jardim de Goiás is a municipality in western Goiás state, Brazil. The population was 8,869 (2020) in a total area of 1,557 km^{2}. Bom Jardim is a large producer of cattle.

== Location ==
Bom Jardim is located 371 km. from the state capital, Goiânia. It is almost due west of the capital and is just south of Aragarças on the Araguaia River. Highway connections from Goiânia are made by GO-060 / Trindade / Turvânia / Israelândia / Iporá / Piranhas / BR-158.

The municipality has boundaries with Aragarças, Baliza, Caiapônia, Piranhas, and Montes Claros de Goiás. Important rivers are the Piranhas, Macaco and Bom Jardim.

== Economy ==
The economy is based on cattle raising and agriculture. The lands produce rice, bananas, hearts of palm, beans, corn, soybeans and others. There are also deposits of copper and granite. There were 136,000 head of cattle in 2007.

The main areas of employment in 2007 were commerce, small transformation industries, agriculture, public administration, and the informal economy. There were 2 financial institutions in 2007—Banco do Brasil S.A. and Bradesco S.A.

Agricultural data 2006

- Number of farms: 832
- Total area: 176,795 ha.
- Area of permanent crops: 162 ha. (bananas, sugarcane, and hearts of palm)
- Area of perennial crops: 1,238 ha. (soybeans, corn, rice)
- Area of natural pasture: 131,817 ha.
- Area of woodland and forests: 42,006 ha.
- Cattle herd: 136,000
- Number of agricultural workers: 2,800
- Number of farms with tractors: 99
- Number of tractors: 111 IBGE

== Health and education ==
- Infant Mortality in 2000: 21.93 for 1,000 live births
- Literacy rate in 2000: 84,6
- Hospitals: 02 with 44 beds
- Schools; 7 with 2,195 students
- Municipal Human Development Index: 0.737
- State ranking: 117 (out of 242 municipalities)
- National ranking: 2,247 (out of 5,507 municipalities)

== History ==
Before European exploration this region was inhabited by the Bororó Indians. In the middle of the nineteenth century Manoel Perdigão discovered gold at a place called Buriti on the banks of the Macacos River. In 1912 the Felizardo family arrived and began a farm called Bom Jardim. A chapel was built in 1914 and Dona Ana Rufina de Faria donated lands for a future town. In 1924 Bom Jardim was elevated to the category of district in the municipality of Rio Bonito, which is present-day Caiapônia. In 1943 the name was changed to Ibotim, of unknown origin, and in 1953 it became a municipality, with the new name of Bom Jardim de Goiás.

== See also ==
- List of municipalities in Goiás
