= João Teixeira de Faria =

Brazilian faith healer and convicted sex offender (born 1942)

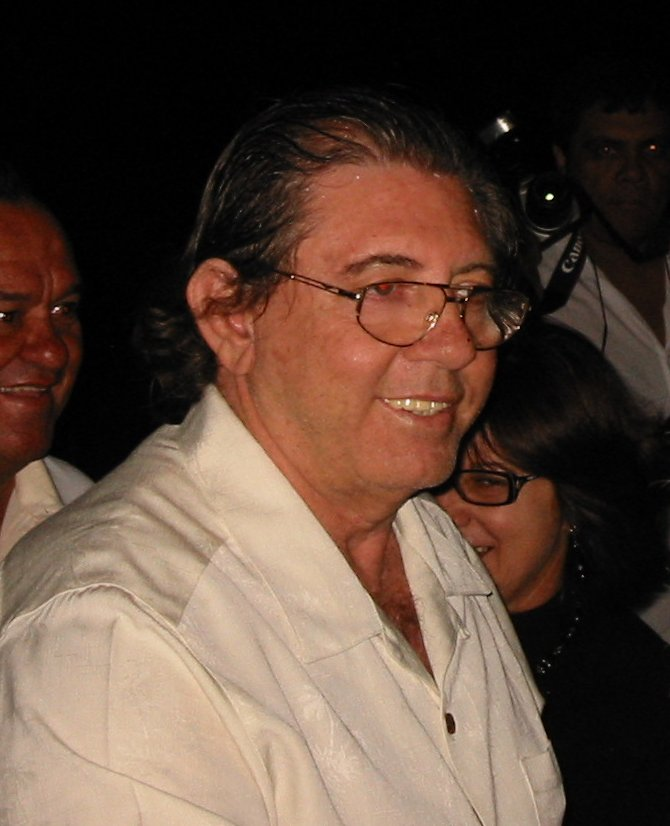
- Faria in 2006
- Born: 24 June 1942 (age 84); Cachoeira de Goiás, Brazil
- Other name: João de Deus (John of God)
- Status: Under house arrest due to the COVID-19 pandemic
- Convictions: Rape, sexual misconduct, illegal possession of firearms
- Penalty: 489 years and 4 months imprisonment

João Teixeira de Faria (born 24 June 1942), known also as João de Deus (John of God), is a Brazilian self-proclaimed medium, and self-proclaimed psychic surgeon. He was based in Abadiânia, Brazil, where he ran a spiritual healing center called the Casa de Dom Inácio de Loyola. He received media coverage on CNN, ABC News, and personally from The Oprah Winfrey Show. However, James Randi and Joe Nickell exposed his healing procedures as nothing more than carnival tricks, and there is no evidence that the benefits reported by patients are anything more than placebo effects.

In 2018, after over 600 accusations of sexual abuse, Faria turned himself in to police. In the following years, he was found guilty of a number of different crimes, including illegal firearm possession and statutory rape. The sentences add up to 489 years and 4 months in prison.

== Early life ==
João Teixeira de Faria was born in Cachoeira de Goiás on 24 June 1942. He has no medical training and describes himself as a "simple farmer". He completed two years of education and spent a number of years travelling from village to village in the states of Goiás and Minas Gerais as a garrafeiro, a sort of travelling medicine man.

== Career ==
=== Overview ===
Faria said he was told by his spirit guides that he must expand his work to reach more people and spiritist medium Chico Xavier told him he should go to the small Goiás town of Abadiânia to fulfill his healing mission. Around 1978, when he first performed healings there, he just sat outdoors in a chair near the main road where people began to arrive seeking cures for their illnesses and conditions. Gradually the numbers increased to thousands per day and he developed his centre, Casa de Dom Inácio de Loyola, which eventually was visited by millions of people seeking healing. Faria also owned a nearby cattle ranch, which covered about 1,000 acres and was valued at over 2 million reais.

Much of his income came from selling passionflower preparations, the single herb prescribed by Faria to cure a variety of ailments. The company that bore his initials, JTF Ltda., marketed the drug and was registered in the name of his wife, Ana Keyla Teixeira, and his driver and employee Abadio da Cruz.

=== Claims of healing powers ===
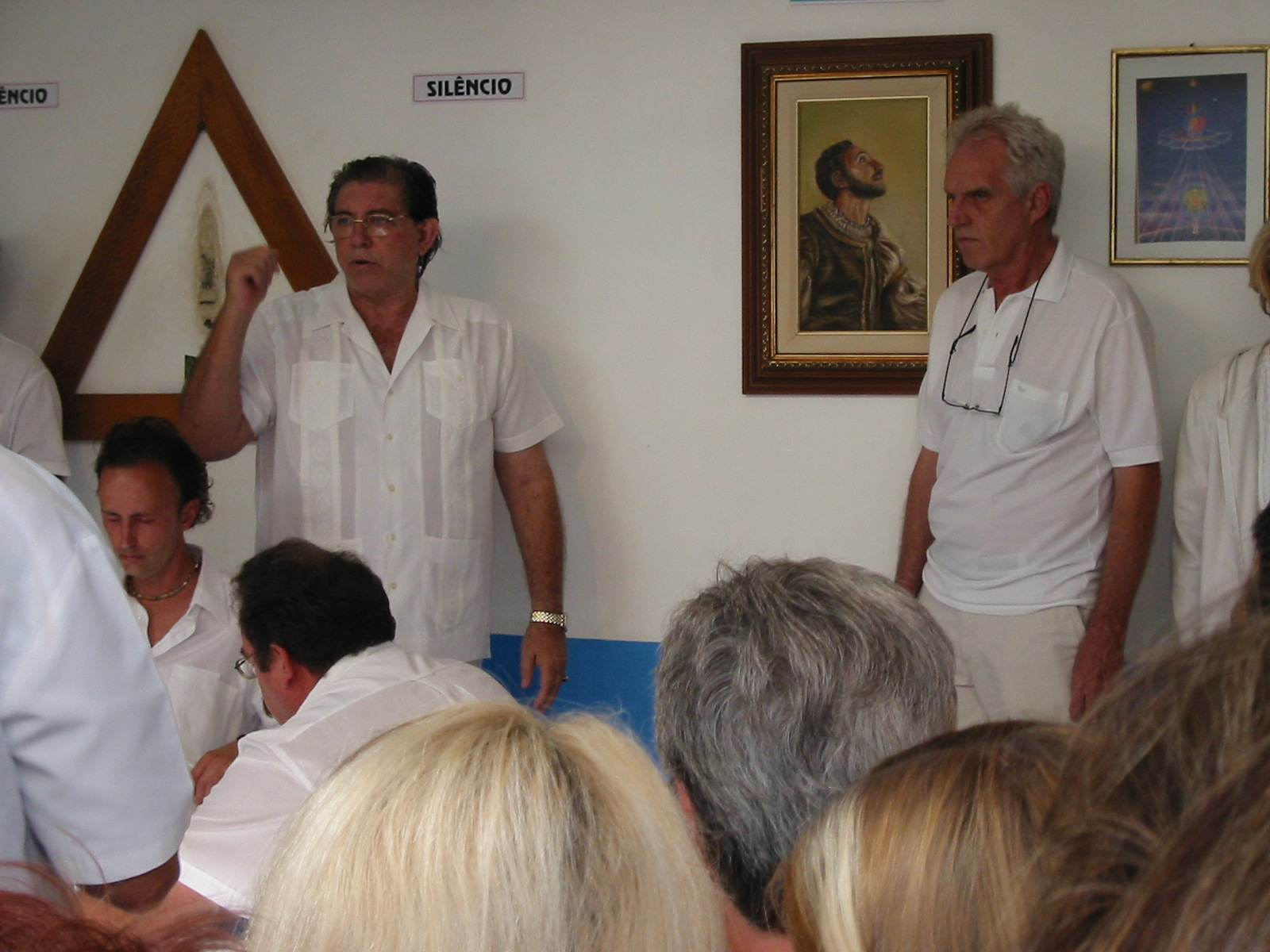
Faria on stage after performing a "psychic surgery"

Faria regularly prescribed meditation and walking to a nearby waterfall as part of treatment. The Casa also sold herbs, "blessed" items and artefacts such as magic triangles. It was estimated by 60 Minutes Australia in 2014 that those sales earned Faria over $10 million per year.

When called for a spiritual surgery by Faria, patients were offered the choice of "visible" or "invisible" operations. If they selected an invisible operation (or were younger than 18 or older than 52) they were directed to sit in a room and meditate. Faria said that spiritual physicians could perform surgery on the actual patient via a surrogate when the actual patient was unable to make the trip.

A very small percentage of people chose a visible operation where Faria operated without anesthetic. Instead he used "energized" mineral water and the spiritual energies allegedly present, the latter of which were provided by groups of volunteers who meditated in a separate room called the 'current room'. Those practices, such as inserting scissors or forceps deep into a nose or scraping an eye without an anesthetic or antiseptics, were scrutinized by medical authorities and skeptical investigators such as James Randi, who called for Faria to stop victimizing people with stunts and trickery.

Faria would tell people not to stop taking their medicine and said that not everyone he "treated" would be cured. Often the treatment included capsules containing pure passion flower, which he would say carried special blessed spiritual energy to support the individual's healing process. Before his final arrest and conviction, Faria had undergone trials and scrutiny of his work; he was arrested several times for practicing medicine without a licence, and was jailed once.

=== Outside Brazil ===
Faria travelled to other countries to perform his healing ceremonies, which he called Live Events. Gail Thackray said in her book, Spiritual Journeys: Visiting John of God, that the main "entities" at work in Brazil were the same ones at Live Events, along with thousands of other entities doing healing work.

== Media coverage ==
=== ABC news report ===
On 14 July 2005, the American Broadcasting Company (ABC) ran a news report about Faria on Primetime Live. The programme featured five people with various medical conditions, including chronic fatigue syndrome, Lou Gehrig's disease and an inoperable brain tumour. Each patient saw Faria and ABC claimed that in three of the cases there had been an improvement. A young female athlete who had been paraplegic was shown beginning to move her legs.

ABC's update on the five subjects indicated that one subject was making slow or no progress, two were worse, and one showed improvement. Subject David Ames died from complications on 16 July 2008. Despite undergoing Faria's psychic surgery and being declared cured, Lisa Melman's breast cancer got progressively worse. She stated the tumor had grown and became painful. She continued to suffer and died in 2012.

Skeptic James Randi spent about an hour in New York being interviewed and taped for the report. Randi later criticised ABC for having cherry-picked his comments to show more credibility for Faria than was justified. Randi gave scientific explanations for all the activities observed. Randi revealed the natural explanations for activities ranging from: putting forceps in the nose, random cutting of the flesh, 'scraping' of the eyeball, the subsequent absence of infection, and other activities one by one as age old parlor tricks. However, he was dismayed that none of his critical comments were shown in the final segment. This was cut down to under 20 seconds of screen time.

=== The Oprah Winfrey Show ===
On 17 November 2010, Susan Casey wrote in O Magazine about her trip to see Faria in Brazil and was subsequently covered on The Oprah Winfrey Show. The article was entitled "Leap of Faith: Meet John of God". The show was entitled "Do You Believe in Miracles?". In both, she discusses her need to deal with the traumatic loss of her father. After he suddenly died in 2008, Casey experienced a "tsunami of grief" that she says she couldn't escape from. She wondered if Faria could help heal her grief. She met him twice and later stated, "Three hours went by like 20 minutes, and it was blissful – it was like I was floating." Casey claims she was able to speak with her dead father. "It was very real," she says. "More of a vision than I had ever had before. ... I got this feeling like I shouldn't be sad, that everything was okay."

While Casey stated that the whole experience sounds unusual, she said that she is "not a woo-woo person" and that Faria helped her find healing. Casey stated that she was a neutral observer. Jeff Rediger, a psychiatrist from Harvard Medical School in Boston, was provided as a "skeptic". Rediger was astonished to discover bleeding from his torso after "invisible" surgery. The show did not provide scientific or medical explanations for the procedures performed. In depth critical investigative reports followed the broadcast.

On 17 March 2013, Oprah's Next Chapter, Season 2, Episode 116, aired a televised show titled "John of God". Oprah traveled to Brazil to meet and talk with Faria. She also interviewed Magnus Kemppii, from Sweden, about his "surgery", and five Americans who hope to be cured from their ailments.

In December 2018, Faria was accused of sexual abuse, rape and pedophilia by more than 200 women. After the allegations became public, Oprah deleted the interviews from her site and released a note stating that she hopes justice will be served.

=== CNN coverage ===
On the 22 December 2010, episode of CNN's AC360, Sanjay Gupta interviewed two of the commentators Oprah Winfrey had sent to meet Faria. Critical investigative reports followed the broadcast.

=== 60 Minutes Australia ===
Faria's first visit to Australia and a 'Live Event' scheduled on 22–24 November 2014 at the Sydney Showground in Sydney Olympic Park garnered much media attention.

After visiting Faria at his "Casa" in Abadiânia, Brazil, the Australian 60 Minutes television program aired a critical investigative report on 25 October 2014, examining Faria's healing treatment practices, the amount of money being made and raising questions about sexual assault allegations against him. The two-part program hosted by reporter Michael Usher was a follow-up to Liz Hayes's 1998 investigation of Faria.

In Part 1 of the follow-up, reporter Michael Usher revealed that a woman declared as cured of breast cancer by a spirit entity channeled by Faria died in 2003. A woman in a wheelchair with multiple sclerosis, who in the 1998 report said she visited Faria with the expectation of walking again, didn't feel any effect, is still in a wheelchair, and suffered a deterioration in her condition. Her trip to the Casa cost $5,000. Usher reported that none of the other people (forty Australians) who made the pilgrimage that Hayes joined for investigation improved.

Usher's report said that some of the thousands in Faria's audience hope to receive "spiritual surgery" from him. In an extended interview, emergency medicine specialist Dr. David Rosengren personally examined and reported these practices as horrendous and barbaric, saying: "… the modern medical world could not condone this behavior in any way whatsoever". The possibility of Faria coming to Australia had also concerned the Australian Medical Association.

In Part 2 of his report, Usher stated that there were two deaths in recent years at the Casa that warranted investigations, but no one was charged. He also reported that in 2010, when Faria visited Sedona, Arizona, the police department investigated him because a woman said he took her hands and placed them on his genitals. The case never went to court; one of his associates encouraged the woman to drop the allegations.

The Catholic Church, through its representative Rev. Brian Lucas, issued a televised verbal warning, stating "John of God doesn't have any official affiliation with the Catholic Church". He cautioned all to be very skeptical of people seeking publicity with claims of miracles and faith healing, more so when there is a lot of money involved.

=== Montreal Gazette ===
On 22 July 2016, the Montreal Gazette published a report on John of God, "Brazilian 'healer' John of God leads cancer patients by the nose", by columnist Joe Schwarcz, accompanied by a video report from 'Dr Joe's' The Right Chemistry series. Schwarcz is an author and a professor at McGill University in Montreal, Quebec. He is the director of McGill's Office for Science & Society, which aims to demystify science for the public. The report starts by detailing Faria's life history as a medium and psychic surgeon. It then examines his practice and supposed treatments, such as the 'Up Your Nose' surgery to treat cancers. Schwarcz also criticised Faria's choices of treatment for his own health problems.

=== Films ===
- Miracle Man: John of God (2005). Director: Bill Hayes. Production: Advanced Medical Productions.
- Healing – Miracles, Mysteries and John of God (2008). Director: David Unterberg. Production: David Films.
- John of God: Just a Man? (2010). Directors: Gail Thackray, Josef Schoffmann. Production: Beyond Words Publishing.
- João de Deus – O Silêncio É Uma Prece (2017). Director: Candé Salles. Production: Cygnus Media.

=== Web series ===
- Em Nome de Deus (2020). Directors: Ricardo Calil, Gian Carlo Bellotti, Monica Almeida. Production and release: TV Globo.
- João de Deus - Cura e Crime (2021). (Original title: John of God: The Crimes of a Spiritual Healer). Directors: Maurício Dias and Tatiana Villela. Production and release: Netflix.
- João sem Deus – A Queda de Abadiânia (2023), the medium is portrayed by Marco Nanini. Director: Marina Person. Production and released by Canal Brasil.

== Personal life ==
Faria was married several times and has had an unknown number of children from his different wives and affairs.

In 2015, Faria was diagnosed with aggressive stomach cancer. A doctor of conventional medicine, Raul Cutait, extracted a 6 cm gastric adenocarcinoma from his stomach. The surgery and follow-up of five months of chemotherapy took place at the Hospital Sírio-Libanês in São Paulo. Faria did not report these facts to the public, originally saying he was being hospitalised for a stomach hernia.

== Arrest and imprisonment ==
In December 2018, allegations of abuse by Faria were put forward by 12 women. The number of claims led to the Prosecution Office of the State of Goiás creating an email address and phone line to receive all accusations towards him. In 30 hours, over 200 complaints were received from nine different Brazilian states and two claims from abroad. Claims were reported by the prosecution's office as having the potential to be the biggest sexual scandal in the history of Brazil, overwhelming the Roger Abdelmassih case. Claims included the alleged abuse of victims as young as 14 years old, as well as a woman who revealed having been abused for three days. On 11 December, four days after the Conversa com Bial show, the number of sexual abuse complaints against Faria had reached 206, prompting him to limit his appointments at Casa Dom Inácio de Loyola. Questioned by reporters, he simply said "I'm innocent" and walked away. On 12 December, the public prosecutor of Goiás called for the arrest of Faria. On 16 December, Faria surrendered himself to the police. The number of sexual abuse accusations gradually reached 600. The rapes occurred from 1986 to 2017.

Faria's daughter Dalva supported the accusers, calling her father a "monster" and alleging that she was beaten and raped by him until she ran away when she was 14 years old. Faria was transferred to a hospital from prison in March 2019. On 19 December, he was sentenced to 19 years and four months for the rapes of four women. He was temporarily released from prison on house arrest when the COVID-19 pandemic struck in early 2020, due to his age and poor health.

In September 2023, Faria was sentenced to an additional 118 years, six months and 15 days in prison by the Goiás state criminal court as a result of 17 cases involving "rape, rape via fraud and rape of a vulnerable individual."

== See also ==
- Pseudoscience
- Jeanette Wilson – self-proclaimed medium and spiritual healer
