= Jaupaci =

- Municipality
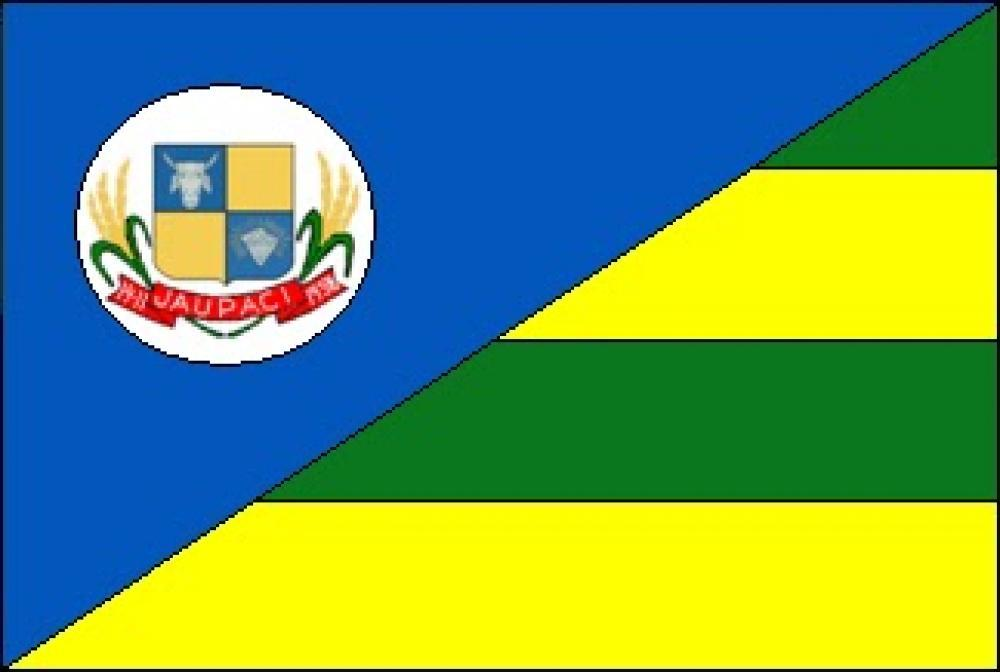
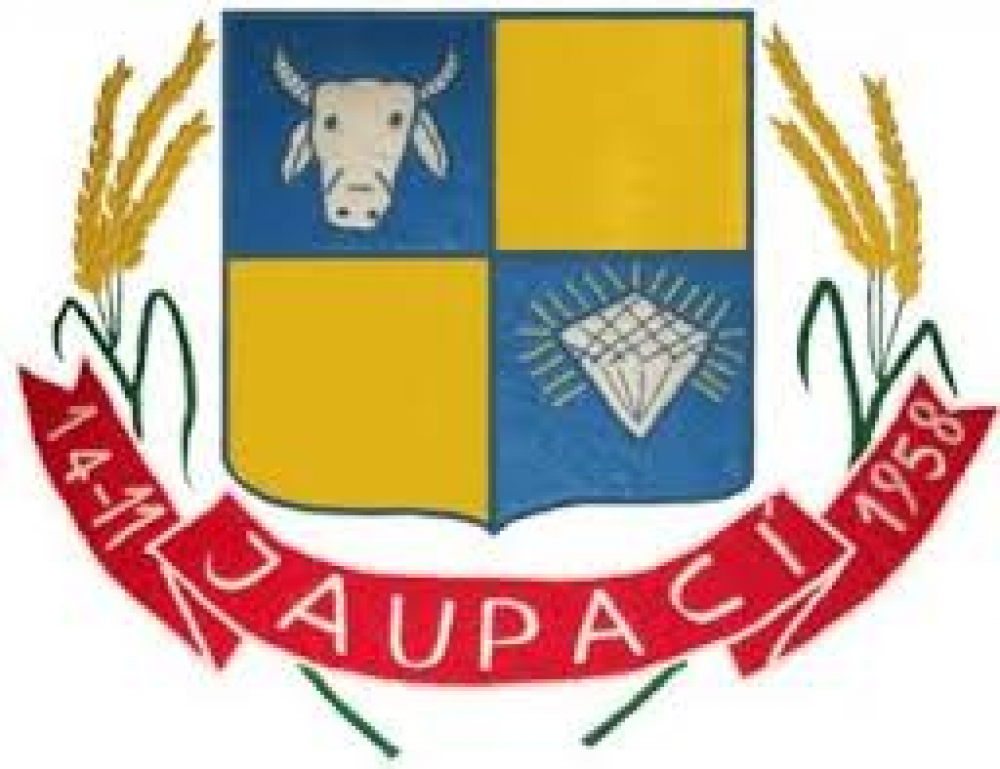
- Flag Coat of arms

- Location in Goiás state

- Location in Brazil
- Coordinates: 16°11′54″S 50°55′37″W
- Country: Brazil
- Region: Central-West
- State: Goiás
- Microregion: Iporá Microregion

Area
  - Total: 527.2 km^{2} (203.6 sq mi)
- Elevation: 354 m (1,161 ft)

Population (2020)
  - Total: 2,860
  - Density: 5.42/km^{2} (14.1/sq mi)
- Time zone: UTC−3 (BRT)
- Postal code: 76210-000

Jaupaci is a municipality in eastern Goiás state, Brazil. The population was 2,860 (2020) in a total area of 527.2 km^{2} (10/10/2002).

== Location ==
- Distance to regional center (Iporá): 46 km.
- Highway connections: state highway BR-069 west from Goiânia, through Trindade, São Luís de Montes Belos, Israelândia, and then GO-173 for 18 kilometers northeast.

Neighboring municipalities: Iporá, Fazenda Nova, Diorama, Montes Claros de Goiás, and Israelândia.

== The economy ==
The economy is based on modest commerce, public employment, modest transformation industries, cattle raising, and agriculture. There is one dairy—JAU - Indústria de Laticínios Ltda. (22/05/2006). There were 35,400 head of cattle in 2006. The main crops were rice, corn, manioc, soybeans, and tomatoes. Most of the land is occupied by pasture for cattle raising.

- GDP (PIB) (R$1,000.00): 16,548 (2005)
- GDP per capita (R$1.00): 5,247 (2005)

Agricultural data 2006

- Farms: 169
- Total area: 32,407 ha.
- Area of permanent crops: 92 ha.
- Area of perennial crops: 333 ha.
- Area of natural pasture: 24,079 ha.
- Area of woodland and forests: 7,226 ha.
- Persons dependent on farming: 630
- Farms with tractors: 42
- Number of tractors: 49
- Cattle herd: 35,400 head IBGE

== Education (2006) and Health (2007) ==
- Schools in activity: 5
- Classrooms: 31
- Teachers: 56
- Total Students: 976
- Hospitals: 1
- Beds: 20
- Public health clinic: 1
- Infant mortality rate: 35.47 (in 1,000 live births)
- Life expectancy: 65.0
- Adult literacy rate: 0.823
- School attendance rate: 0.855
- Municipal Human Development Index: 0.710 (2000)

For the complete list see Frigoletto.com.br

== History ==
The history of Jaupaci begins in the 1950s when diamonds were discovered in the region. Panhandlers arrived and settled on lands belonging to João Paraíba, who already lived there. The population increased and the first general stores appeared to cater to the miners. The settlement was called Monção do Pacu, after a diamond mining site. In 1958 it became a municipality, without being a district first, and changed to the name to Jaupaci, after the three rivers that cross its territory— the Jau, Pacu, and Cipó.

== See also ==
- List of municipalities in Goiás
