= Fátima Ferreira =

Austrian biochemist

- Born: 16 February 1959 (age 67); Cachoeira de Goiás
- Awards: Scientist of the Year award

Academic background
- Education: Federal University of Uberlândia, University of São Paulo

Academic work
- Institutions: Federal University of Santa Catarina, University of Toronto; University of Vienna; University of Salzburg
- Main interests: Biologist, biochemist

Fátima Ferreira-Briza (born 16 February 1959, Cachoeira de Goias, Brazil) is a Brazilian-Austrian biologist, biochemist and educator. Since 2010, she has been Professor of Molecular Biology at the University of Salzburg, Austria, where, since October 2011, she has also been Vice-Rector for Research with responsibility for the Faculty of Natural Sciences.

== Biography ==
Born in Cachoeira de Goiás in central Brazil, in 1977 Ferreira completed her high school in Uberlândia. Ferreira studied dentistry at the Federal University of Uberlândia, where she graduated with a DDS degree in 1981. After earning a PhD degree in biochemical sciences at the University of São Paulo in 1987, she worked as a research assistant at the Federal University of Santa Catarina (1988), the University of Toronto (1990) and the University of Vienna (1992). While she was in Toronto, she met her future husband, Peter Briza, an associate professor of genetics at the University of Salzburg.

In 1992, Ferreira was appointed assistant professor at the Institute of Genetics and General Biology at the University of Salzburg. While serving there, she received an MSc degree from the University of Vienna for her thesis Molecular basis of immunoglobulin E recognition of Bet v 1, the major allergen of birch pollen. After becoming associate professor at Salzburg University's Molecular Biology Department, she became full professor in 2010. In October 2011, she received the post of Vice-Rector for Research while heading the Christian Doppler Laboratory for Allergy Diagnosis and Therapy.

The focus of Ferreira's research is the molecular and immunological characterization of pollen allergens, especially of birch, ragweed, mugwort, Japanese cedar and cypress, their interaction with the immune system and the development of new diagnostic and therapeutic approaches, including protein-based vaccines for allergic diseases.

== Awards ==
In 2008, Ferreira received the Scientist of the Year award from the Austrian Club of Education and Science Journalists. In connection with the award, she was invited to Washington D.C. where she gave a lecture on allergies.
