= Diorama, Goiás =

Diorama
- Municipality
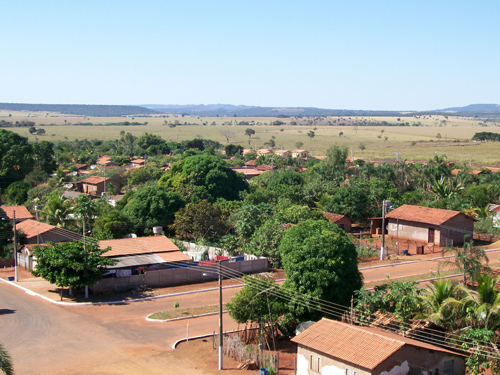

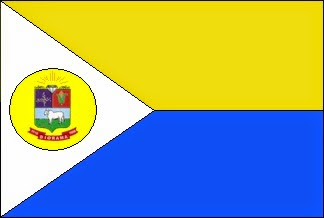
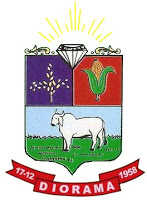
- Flag Coat of arms

- Location in Goiás state

- Location in Brazil
- Coordinates: 16°14′10″S 51°15′31″W
- Country: Brazil
- Region: Central-West
- State: Goiás
- Microregion: Aragarças Microregion

Area
  - Total: 687 km^{2} (265 sq mi)
- Elevation: 506 m (1,660 ft)

Population (2020)
  - Total: 2,479
  - Density: 3.61/km^{2} (9.35/sq mi)
- Time zone: UTC−3 (BRT)
- Postal code: 76260-000

Diorama is a municipality in eastern Goiás state, Brazil.

== Location and connections ==
Diorama is 254 kilometres (158 mi) west of the state capital, Goiânia, and 30 kilometres (19 mi) west of the regional center, Iporá. Neighboring municipalities are Montes Claros de Goiás, Arenópolis, Iporá and Israelândia.

Highway connections from Goiânia are made by GO-060 / Trindade / Nazário / São Luís de Montes Belos / Israelândia / Iporá / GO-174.

== The economy ==
The economy is based on agriculture, livestock raising and wood processing. In 2007, there were two small transformation industries and 24 commercial units. There were 59,000 head of cattle. Agricultural production was modest with small areas of rice, bananas, beans, sugarcane, corn and soybeans.

Agricultural data 2006

- Number of farms: 391
- Total area: 48,159 hectares (119,000 acres)
- Area of permanent crops: 30 hectares (74 acres) (bananas)
- Area of perennial crops: 557 hectares (1,380 acres) (soybeans, corn, rice)
- Area of natural pasture: 36,229 hectares (89,520 acres)
- Area of woodland and forests: 10,988 hectares (27,150 acres)
- Cattle herd: 59,000
- Number of workers: 730
- Number of farms with tractors: 58
- Number of tractors: 70

== Education and health ==
- Literacy rate: 83.5%
- Infant mortality rate: 21.93 in 1,000 live births
- Schools: 5 (2006) with 695 students
- Hospitals: 1 with 26 beds (2007)
- Municipal Human Development Index: 0.733
- State ranking: 135 (out of 242 municipalities in 2000)
- National ranking: 2,363 (out of 5,507 municipalities in 2000)

== History ==
Settlement began in 1946 on lands belonging to the municipality of Iporá. A local rancher, Edmundo Benuto Dias, donated land for a new settlement which was called Aropi, the inversion of the name Iporá. In 1954, it was elevated to the category of district with the new name of Mendelândia, after Antônio Mendes, one of the pioneers of the region. In 1955, the name was changed to Diorama, of unknown origin. In 1958, it became a municipality.

== See also ==
- List of municipalities in Goiás
