= Arenópolis =

- Municipality
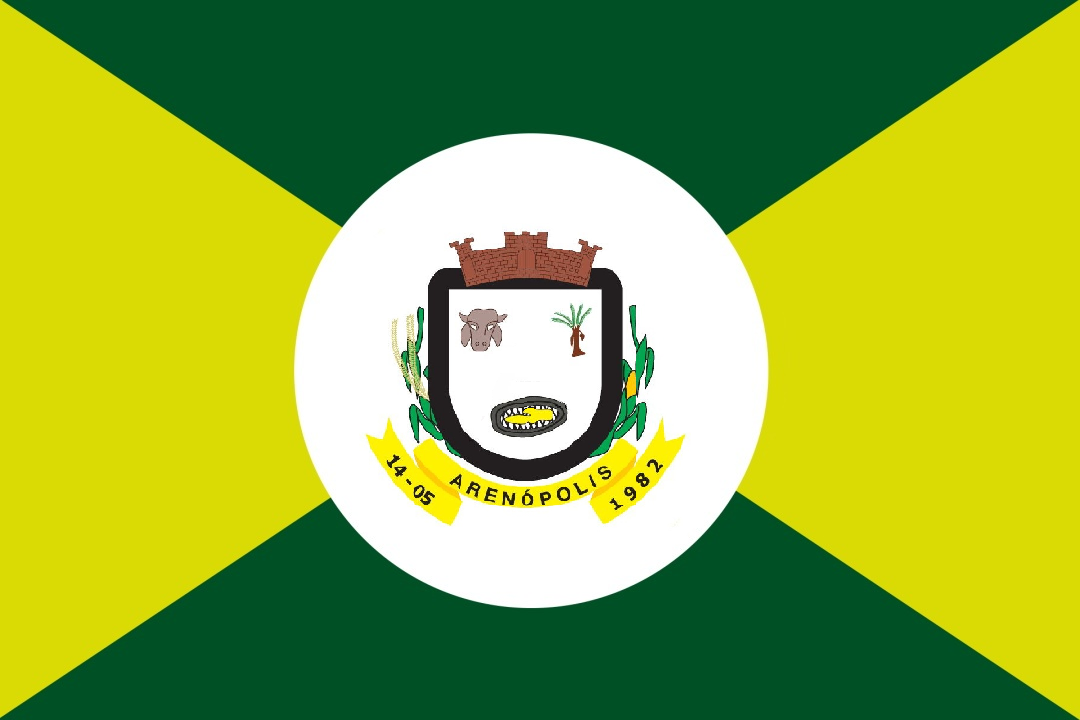
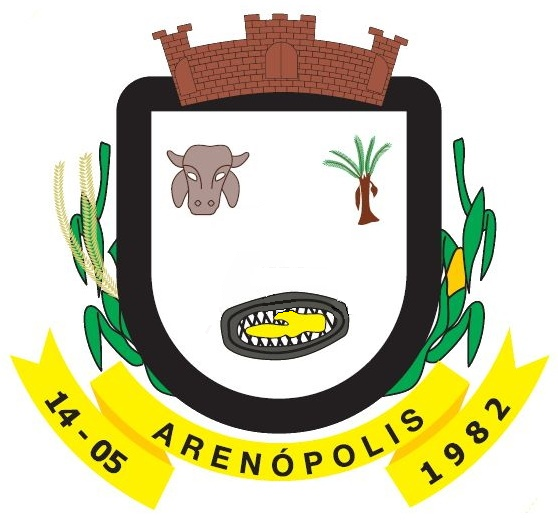
- Flag Coat of arms

- Location in Goiás state

- Location in Brazil
- Coordinates: 16°22′52″S 51°33′26″W
- Country: Brazil
- Region: Central-West
- State: Goiás
- Microregion: Aragarças Microregion

Area
  - Total: 1,074.5 km^{2} (414.9 sq mi)
- Elevation: 416 m (1,365 ft)

Population (2020)
  - Total: 2,536
  - Density: 2.360/km^{2} (6.113/sq mi)
- Time zone: UTC−3 (BRT)
- Postal code: 76235-000

Arenópolis is a municipality in eastern Goiás state, Brazil. The population was 3,495 (2007) in a total area of 1,074.5 km^{2}.

== Location and Connections with Goiânia ==
Arenópolis is located in the Aragarças Microregion in an isolated and underpopulated region of eastern Goiás. There are highway connections with Iporá, 42 km.to the east; and Piranhas, 32 km. to the west. It is between the Rio Piranhas and the Rio Caiapó, both tributaries of the Araguaia River.

The distance to the state capital, Goiânia, is 285 km. and connections are made by GO-060 / Trindade / Turvânia / Israelândia. Neighboring municipalities are:

- north: Montes Claros de Goiás and Diorama
- south: Palestina de Goiás
- east: Iporá
- west: Piranhas

== Demographic and Political Data ==
- Population density: 3.25 inhabitants/km^{2} (2007)
- Population growth rate 2000/2007: -1,91.%
- Urban population: 2,116
- Rural population: 1,379
- Eligible voters: 2,955 (11/2007)
- City government in 2005: mayor (Orestino Vilela Faria), vice-mayor (José Rodrigues de Souza), and 09 councilmembers

== Economy ==
The main economic activities are cattle raising, agriculture, public administration, commerce, and small transformation industries.

There were 85,600 head of cattle in 2006, of which 9,600 were milk cows. The main agricultural products were rice, corn, manioc, beans, and soybeans. There was modest production of bananas, hearts of palm, and coconut. Commerce had 37 units in 2003 employing 53 workers.

There were 112 automobiles and pickup trucks, 08 trucks, and 96 motorcycles in 2004. There were no financial institutions reporting in 2007.

== Health and education ==
- Hospitals: 01 with 25 beds (2007)
- Schools: 05 with 947 students
- Infant mortality rate in 2000: 18.31
- Infant mortality rate in 1990: 39.22
- Literacy rate in 2000: 81.8

Arenópolis had a rating of 0.739 and was ranked 110 out of 242 municipalities in Goiás on the United Nations Human Development Index (2000 data). Nationally it was ranked 2,173 out of 5,507 municipalities.

== History ==
In 1956 Albino Borges moved into this region located in the municipality of Piranhas. He began to sell lots to newcomers attracted by the fertile land and soon a small village appeared called Areia, the name of the stream bathing the region. In 1964 Antônio de Castro moved to the region and worked to raise the village to the category of district, which was achieved in 1971 with the name Arenópolis. Later, in 1982 Arenópolis was dismembered and became a municipality.

== See also ==
- List of municipalities in Goiás
