= Goiano =

Goiano may refer to:

- Demonym of Goiás state, Brazil
- Campeonato Goiano, a Brazilian football (soccer) competition
- Goiano (footballer, born 1935), full name Clenílton Ataíde Cavalcante, Brazilian football striker
- Luís Carlos Goiano (born 1968), Brazilian football defensive midfielder
- Sandro Goiano (footballer, born 1973), Brazilian football defensive midfielder
- Sandro Goiano (footballer, born 1978), Brazilian football forward
- Goiano (footballer, born 1980), full name Emerson Bueno dos Santos, Brazilian football right-back
- Keninha Goiano (born 1985), Brazilian football attacking midfielder
