= Moiporá =

- Municipality
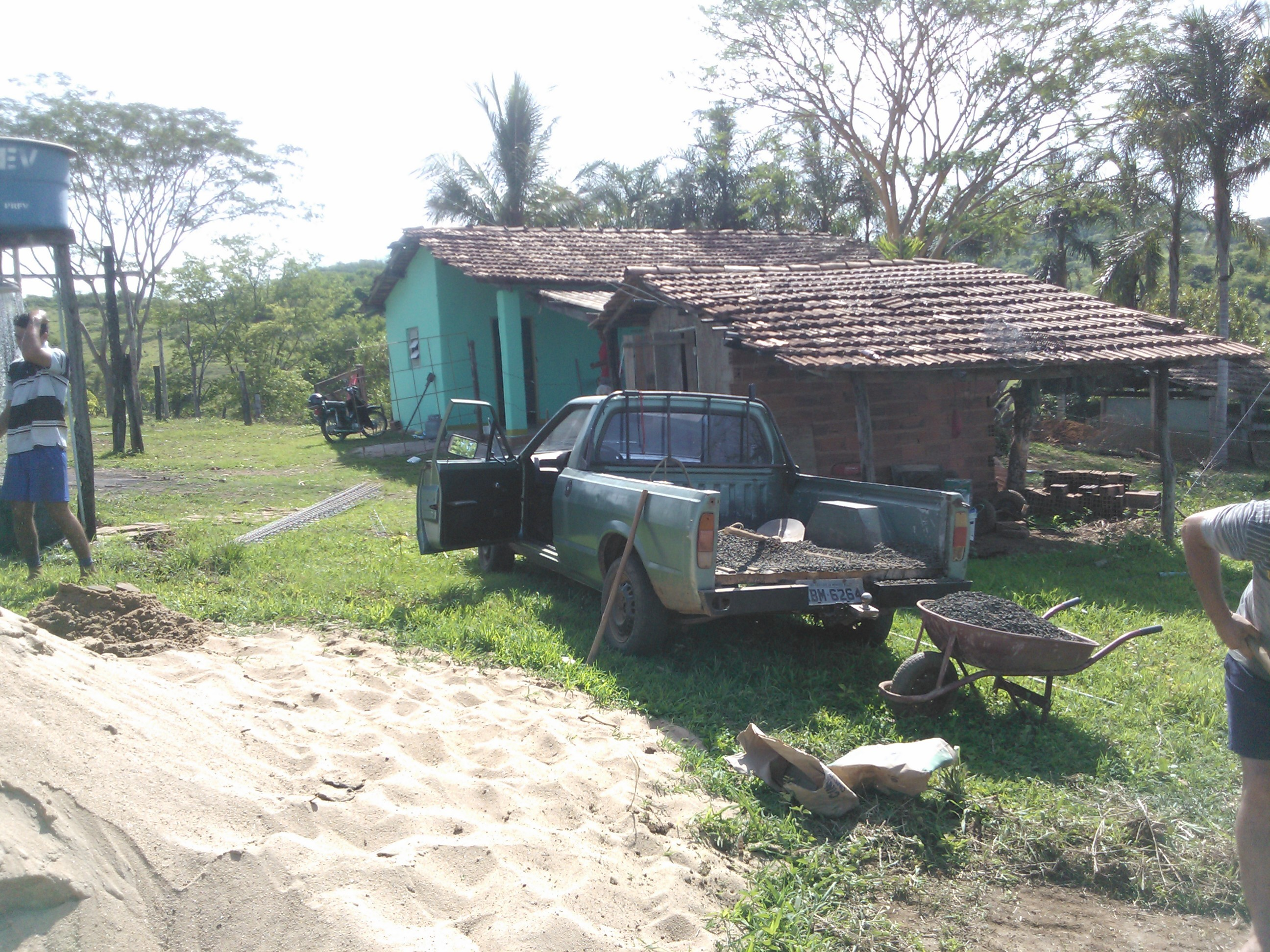

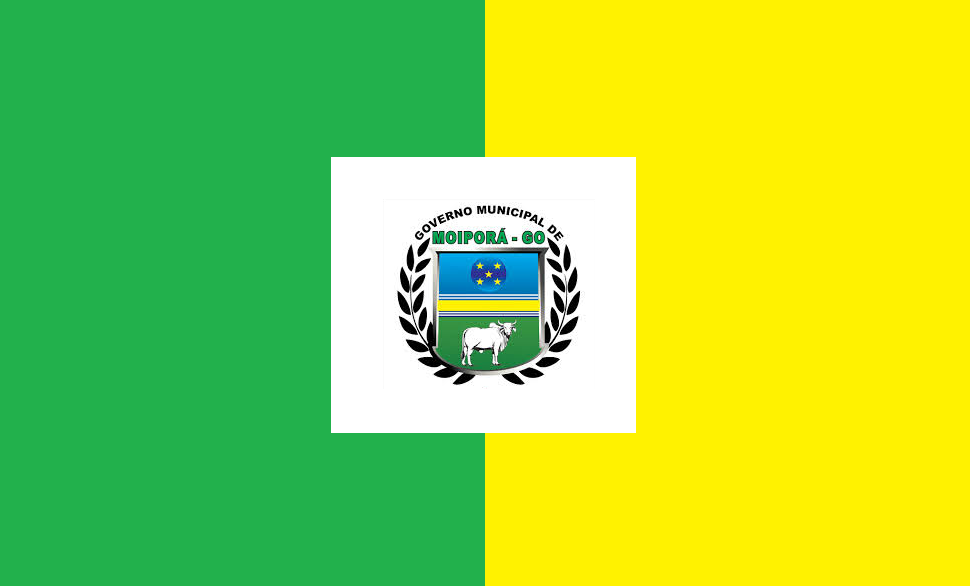
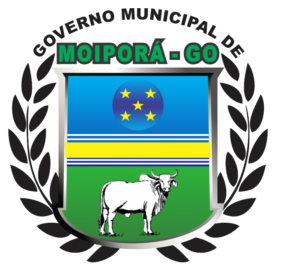
- Flag Coat of arms

- Location in Goiás state

- Location in Brazil
- Coordinates: 16°32′26″S 50°43′36″W
- Country: Brazil
- Region: Central-West
- State: Goiás
- Microregion: Iporá Microregion

Area
  - Total: 460.6 km^{2} (177.8 sq mi)
- Elevation: 678 m (2,224 ft)

Population (2020)
  - Total: 1,501
  - Density: 3.259/km^{2} (8.440/sq mi)
- Time zone: UTC−3 (BRT)
- Postal code: 76135-000

Moiporá is a municipality in eastern Goiás state, Brazil.

== Distances and Highway Connections ==
- Distance to the state capital: 160 km.
- Distance to regional center (Iporá): 76 km.
- Highway connections: state highway BR-069 west from Goiânia, through Trindade, São Luís de Montes Belos, and then GO-444 for 44 kilometers to Moiporá.

== Municipal Boundaries ==
Neighboring municipalities: Iporá, Córrego do Ouro, Cachoeira de Goiás, Ivolândia, Aurilândia, and Israelândia.

== Economic Information ==
The economy was based on services, public employment, small transformation industries, cattle raising, and agriculture. In 2005 there were 3 industrial units and 20 retail units. The sector employing more workers was public administration with 153 workers in 2003. There were no financial institutions in 2007.

- GDP (PIB) (R$1,000.00): 12,373 (2005)
- GDP per capita (R$1.00): 6,588 (2005)

In 2006 there were 50,000 head of cows, of which 4,350 were milk cows. Swine, poultry, egg, and milk production were modest. The main agricultural products in planted area were rice, bananas, manioc, and corn. None exceeded 500 planted hectares.

Agricultural data 2006

- Farms: 235
- Total area: 37,042 ha.
- Area of permanent crops: 41 ha.
- Area of perennial crops: 417 ha.
- Area of natural pasture: 28,356 ha.
- Area of woodland and forests: 7,450 ha.
- Persons dependent on farming: 700
- Farms with tractors: 25
- Number of tractors: 37
- Cattle herd: 92,000 head

== Health and education ==
In 2007 there were no hospitals and only 4 walk-in health clinics. The infant mortality rate was 28.88 for every 1,000 live births in 2000.

In 2006 the school system had 4 schools, 20 classrooms, 23 teachers, and 399 students. There were no institutions of higher learning. The adult literacy rate was 85.7% in 2000.

- Municipal Human Development Index: 0.730
- State ranking: 144 (out of 442 municipalities in 2000)
- National ranking: 2,418 (out of 5,507 municipalities in 2000)

== History ==
The region was settled in 1930 by Sebastião Moreira da Silva and his children who built the first huts in an area of fertile lands and perennial springs. With the arrival of new settlers a village (arraial) was formed called "Cobó", the name given to the knife that Silva used to keep away creditors who wanted to charge him. In 1953 the settlement became a district belonging to Aurilândia and was called Moiporá, a combination of Moitu (Cachoeira de Goiás) and Iporá, a neighboring municipality. In 1958 it was dismembered from Aurilândia and made a municipality.

== See also ==
- List of municipalities in Goiás
