= Goiano (footballer, born 1980) =

Brazilian footballer

Personal information
- Full name: Emerson Bueno dos Santos
- Date of birth: June 15, 1980 (age 46)
- Place of birth: Bom Jardim de Goiás, Brazil
- Height: 1.74 m (5 ft 9 in)
- Position: Right back

Team information
- Current team: Paraná

Youth career
- 1999–2000: Paraná

Senior career*
Years	Team	Apps	(Gls)
2001–2006	Paraná	84	(0)
- * Club domestic league appearances and goals

Emerson Bueno dos Santos (born June 15, 1980 in Bom Jardim de Goiás), or simply Goiano, is a Brazilian right back for Paraná in the Brazilian Série A.

== Honours ==
- Paraná State League: 1997
- Brazilian League (2nd division): 2000

== Contract ==
- 1 April 2007 to 31 December 2008
