= Microregion of Aragarças =

Coordinates: 15°53′52″S 52°15′03″W

Aragarças
- Microregion
- Location in Goias state
- Country: Brazil
- State: Goiás
- Mesoregion: Noroeste Goiano
- Municipalities: 7

Area
  - Total: 11,091.90 km^{2} (4,282.61 sq mi)

Population (2007)
  - Total: 53,541
  - Density: 4.8/km^{2} (13/sq mi)

The Aragarças Microregion is a geographical division in Goiás state, Brazil. It consists of 7 municipalities located around Aragarças in western Goiás.

== Municipalities ==
The microregion consists of the following municipalities:

Name	Population	Area in km^{2}
Aragarças	17,156	660
Arenópolis	3,495	3,495
Baliza	3,299	1,789
Bom Jardim de Goiás	8,372	1,557
Diorama	2,236	687
Montes Claros de Goiás	7,844	2,899
Piranhas	11,139	2,047
Total	53,541	11,092

The most populous municipality is Aragarças with 17,156 inhabitants and the least populous is Diorama with 2,236 inhabitants. The largest municipality in area is Montes Claros de Goiás with 2,909.4 km^{2} and the smallest is Diorama with 689.6 km^{2}.

== See also ==
- List of municipalities in Goiás
- Microregions of Goiás
