= Montes Claros de Goiás =

- Municipality
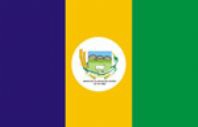
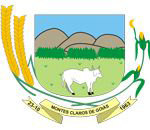
- Flag Coat of arms

- Location in Goiás state

- Location in Brazil
- Coordinates: 16°00′42″S 51°23′13″W
- Country: Brazil
- Region: Central-West
- State: Goiás
- Microregion: Aragarças Microregion

Area
  - Total: 2,899 km^{2} (1,119 sq mi)
- Elevation: 472 m (1,549 ft)

Population (2020)
  - Total: 8,047
  - Density: 2.776/km^{2} (7.189/sq mi)
- Time zone: UTC−3 (BRT)
- Postal code: 76255-000

Montes Claros de Goiás is a municipality in western Goiás state, Brazil

== Location and connections ==
Montes Claros is located in the extreme west of the state, about 70 km east of the Araguaia River. It is east of Aragarças and west of Jussara.

Montes Claros is connected by poor roads to Aragarças, 117 km to the west; and Jussara, 56 km to the west. It is bathed by the Rio Claro, the Araguaia River, the Caiapó, the Rio das Almas or Rio dos Bois.

Neighboring municipalities are: Aragarças, Arenópolis, Bom Jardim de Goiás, Diorama, Fazenda Nova, Jaupaci, Jussara and the state of Mato Grosso.

== Political information ==
In January 2005, the Mayor was Manoel Carlos da Silva Filho and the Vice-mayor was Antônio Cícero Alves. There were 9 council-members on the city council and the number of eligible voters was 5,834 in 2007.

== Demographic information ==
In 2007, the population density was 2.71 inhabitants/km^{2}. The population has decreased by almost 1,500 inhabitants since 1980. Between 1996 and 2007, it decreased -0.142.%. In 2007, the number of urban inhabitants (4,856) surpassed the number of rural inhabitants (2,988).

== Economic information ==
The main economic activity is cattle raising with 255,000 head of beef cattle and 16,500 head of dairy cattle in 2006. Most of the population worked in services, public administration, modest transformation industries, and agriculture. In 2007, there were 9 industrial units and 131 retail units and the sector employing the most workers was commerce. In the same year, there were two financial institutions: Banco do Brasil S.A. and BRADESCO S.A.. There were 429 automobiles in 2007.

In 2005, the main agricultural products by area were rice, beans, corn, and soybeans. Soybean production has increased substantially in recent years and there were 7,200 ha. planted in 2006 with a production of 21,000 tons.

Agricultural data 2006

- Number of farms: 687
- Total area: 220,739 ha.
- Area of permanent crops: 276 ha. (bananas)
- Area of perennial crops: 35,811 ha. (soybeans, corn, rice)
- Area of natural pasture: 120,671 ha.
- Area of woodland and forests: 52,005 ha.
- Cattle herd: 255,000
- Number of agricultural workers: 1,900
- Number of farms with tractors: 144
- Number of tractors: 259 IBGE

== Health and education ==
In 2007, there was 1 hospital with 14 beds and 1 walk-in health clinic. The infant mortality rate was 18.31 for every 1,000 live births in 2000. In 2006, the school system had 16 schools, 78 classrooms, 146 teachers and 2,357 students. There were no institutions of higher learning and the adult literacy rate was 84.5% in 2000.

- Municipal Human Development Index: 0.750
- Ranking with municipalities in Goiás: 78 out of 242 in 2000
- National ranking: 1,894 out of 5,507 in 2000

== History ==
Settlement began in 1956 on the Fazenda Salobinha owned by Enemias Lino de Oliveira. The owner donated the land, which was divided into lots and sold at low prices to new settlers. The first name was "Salobinha". In 1958, it became a district of the municipality of Goiás, passing to the new municipality of Diorama in the same year. In 1963, it became an independent municipality with the new name of Montes Claros de Goiás, taken from the existence of small hills nearby and the Rio Claro, which lies 15 kilometers from the municipal seat.

== See also ==
- List of municipalities in Goiás
