= Cachoeira de Goiás =

- Municipality
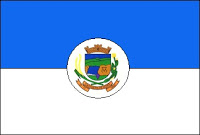
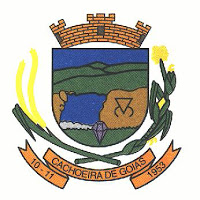
- Flag Coat of arms

- Location in Goiás state

- Location in Brazil
- Coordinates: 16°40′39″S 50°38′47″W
- Country: Brazil
- Region: Central-West
- State: Goiás
- Microregion: Iporá Microregion

Area
  - Total: 417.1 km^{2} (161.0 sq mi)
- Elevation: 764 m (2,507 ft)

Population (2020)
  - Total: 1,342
  - Density: 3.217/km^{2} (8.333/sq mi)
- Time zone: UTC−3 (BRT)
- Postal code: 76125-000

Cachoeira de Goiás is a municipality in eastern Goiás state, Brazil.

== Location ==
- Distance to the state capital: 172 km.
- Distance to regional center (Iporá): 77 km.
- Highway connections: state highway GO-060 west from Goiânia, through Trindade, São Luís de Montes Belos, and then GO-417 for 44 kilometers southwest to Cachoeira de Goiás. For all highway connections see Seplan. Neighboring municipalities are Ivolândia, Moiporá, Aurilândia, and Paraúna.

== Demographics ==
The population growth rate from 1996 to 2007 was 0.25%. Out of the total population of 1,410, 1,106 were considered urban while 304 were considered rural. The population has increased by about 200 persons since the census of 1980 with the urban population doubling and the rural population decreasing by half.

== The economy ==
The economy is based on cattle raising (24,000 head in 2006), agriculture, retail establishments, and several modest transformation industries.

Agricultural data 2006

- Farms: 109
- Total area: 28,823 ha.
- Area of permanent crops: not available
- Area of perennial crops: not available
- Area of natural pasture: 22,025 ha.
- Area of woodland and forests: 5,812 ha.
- Persons dependent on farming: 300
- Farms with tractors: 13
- Number of tractors: 20
- Cattle herd: 24,000 head

== Health and education ==
- Infant mortality in 2000: 35.47
- Literacy rate in 2000: 82.4
- Schools: 2
- Total number of students: 425
- Municipal Human Development Index: 0.704

== History ==
The settlement of Cachoeira de Goiás began in 1892 when Manoel Fernandes Pereira and other families built a chapel honoring the Divine Spirit. The growth was slow until Coronel Francisco Seabra de Guimarães worked to make it a district of the capital Goiás with the name of Cachoeira da Fumaça. In 1938 it became a district of the municipality of Paraúna with the name Moitu, of unknown origin. In 1948 it became a district in the municipality of Aurilândia, finally becoming independent in 1953.

== See also ==
- List of municipalities in Goiás
- Microregions of Goiás
