= Firminópolis =

- Municipality
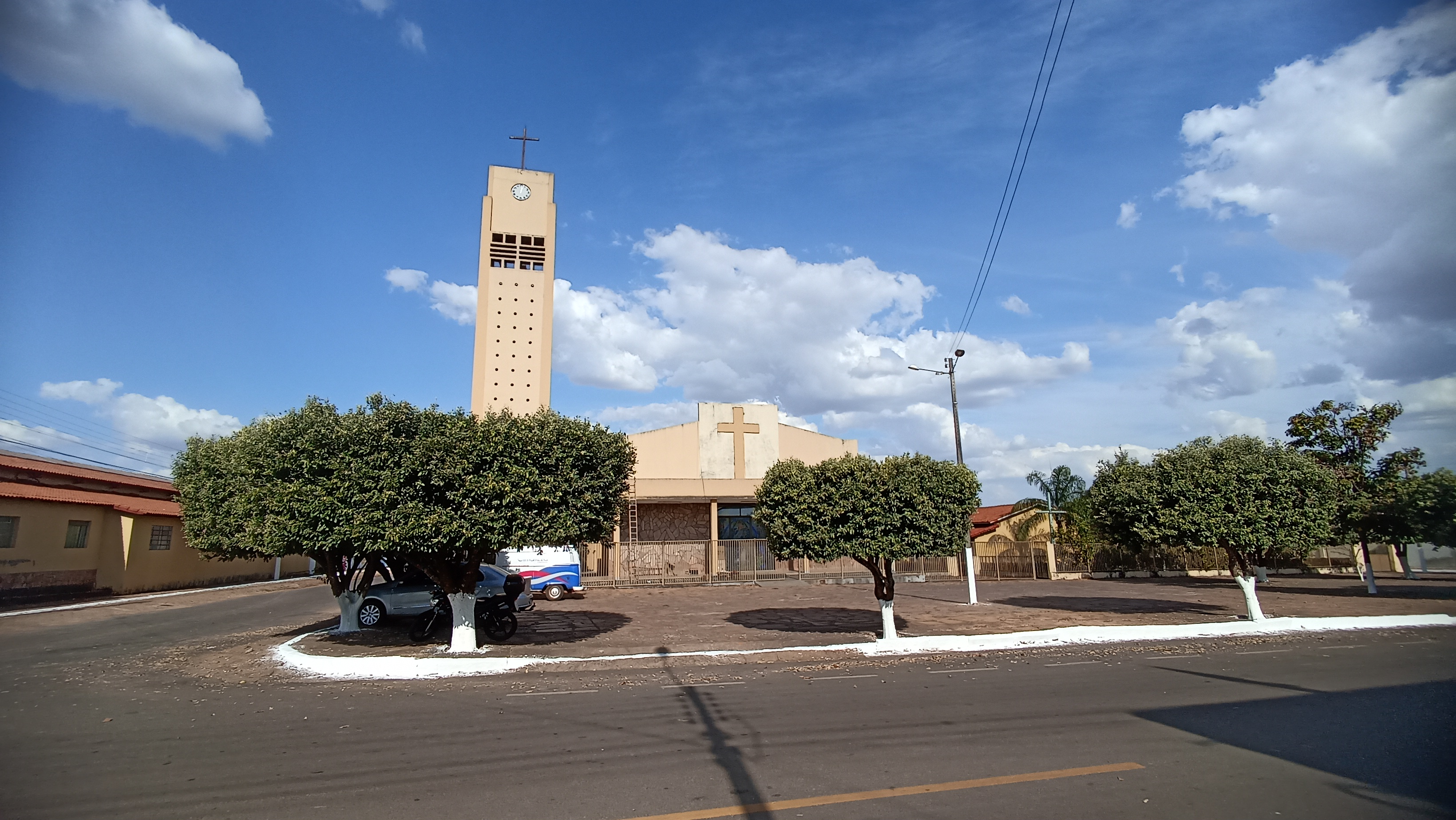

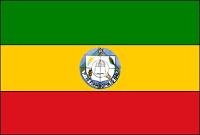
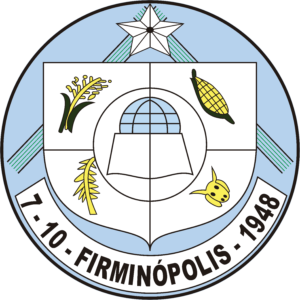
- Flag Coat of arms

- Location in Goiás state

- Location in Brazil
- Coordinates: 16°34′56″S 50°18′06″W
- Country: Brazil
- Region: Central-West
- State: Goiás
- Microregion: Anicuns Microregion

Area
  - Total: 407.5 km^{2} (157.3 sq mi)
- Elevation: 685 m (2,247 ft)

Population (2020)
  - Total: 13,449
  - Density: 33.00/km^{2} (85.48/sq mi)
- Time zone: UTC−3 (BRT)
- Postal code: 76105-000

Firminópolis is a municipality in eastern Goiás state, Brazil.

== Location and connections ==
- Distance to São Luís de Montes Belos: 9 km.

Highway connections with Goiânia are made by state highway BR-069 west from Goiânia, passing through Trindade, Santa Bárbara de Goiás, Turvânia, and then 19 kilometers west to Firminópolis. Neighboring municipalities are Turvânia and Aurilândia.

== Demographic data ==
- Population growth rate 2000/2007: 0.53%
- Urban population in 2007: 8,212
- Rural population in 2007: 2,074

== Economic data ==
The main economic activities were small transformation industries, goods and services, and agricultural production. There were 2 banking institutions: Banco do Brasil S.A. - Banco Itaú S.A. (08/2007) There was 1 dairy: Manoel Pereira Peixoto (05/2006). The cattle herd had 55,0000 head (2006) and the main crops were rice, corn, soybeans, manioc, hearts of palm, and bananas.

== Education and health ==
- Literacy rate: 84.1%
- Infant mortality rate: 18.35 in 1,000 live births
- Schools: 8 (2006)
- Students: 2,382
- Hospitals: 3 (2007) with 69 beds.
- MHDI: 0.744
- State ranking: 91 (out of 242 municipalities in 2002)
- National ranking: 2,039 (out of 5,507 municipalities in 2002)

For the complete list see frigoletto.com.br.

== See also ==
- List of municipalities in Goiás
- Microregions of Goiás
