= Iporá =

- Municipality
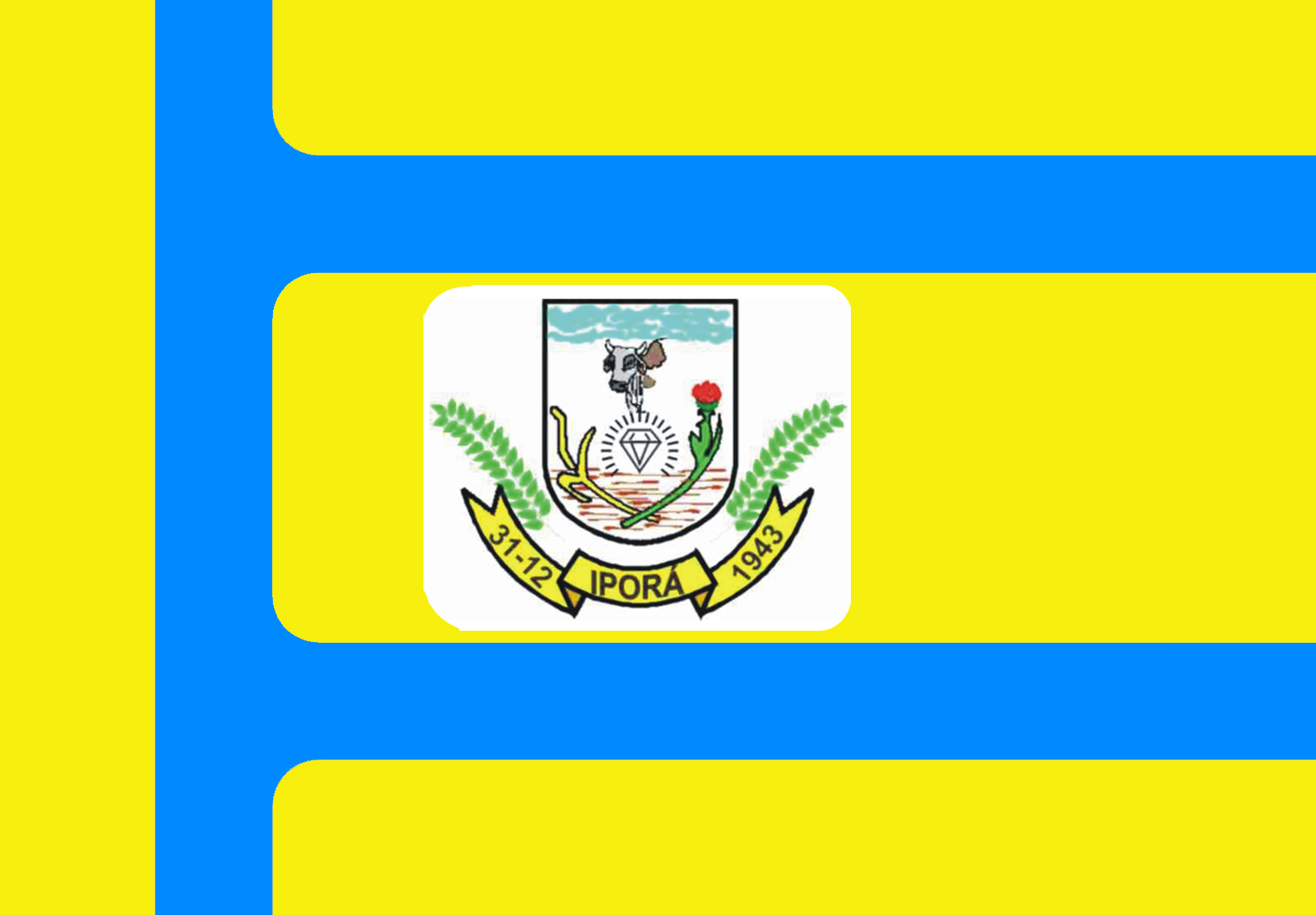
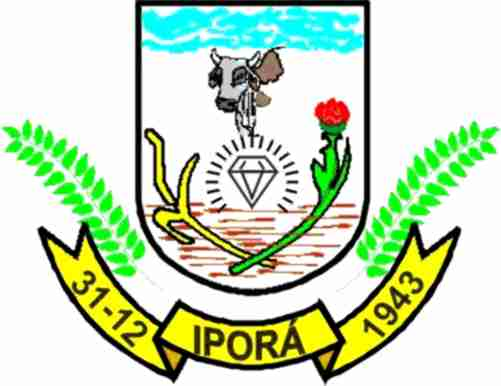
- Flag Coat of arms

- Location in Goiás state

- Location in Brazil
- Coordinates: 16°26′28″S 51°07′10″W
- Country: Brazil
- Region: Central-West
- State: Goiás
- Microregion: Iporá Microregion

Area
  - Total: 1,026.4 km^{2} (396.3 sq mi)
- Elevation: 584 m (1,916 ft)

Population (2020)
  - Total: 31,499
  - Density: 30.689/km^{2} (79.484/sq mi)
- Time zone: UTC-03:00 (BRT)
  - Summer (DST): UTC-02:00 (BRST)
- Postal code: 76200-000
- Website: www.ipora.go.gov.br

Iporá is a municipality in west-central Goiás state, Brazil. The population is around 31,499 (2020) in a total area of 1,026.4 km^{2} (10/10/2002). It is known as the City of the Clear Waters because of its many streams and rivers.

== Location ==
Iporá is the center of the Iporá Microregion, in the Goiás West Region. The distance to the state capital, Goiânia, is 225 km. and connections are made by highway GO-060 passing through / Trindade / Turvânia / Firminópolis /Nazário / São Luís dos Montes Belos Israelândia. The municipal boundaries in the north are with Diorama, Jaupaci and Israelândia; in the south with Amorinópolis and Ivolândia; in the east with Moiporá and Ivolândia; and in the west with Arenópolis.

== Geography and climate ==
There are low mountains: Serra do Caiapó, Serra dos Pilões, Serra do Rio Claro, and Morro do Macaco, where there are deposits of nickel.

The region has a tropical climate, hot and semi-moist, with two well defined seasons: humid, from October to March, with torrential rains, corresponding to spring and summer and known as the season of the waters; and dry, from April to September, corresponding to autumn and winter, known as the dry season. The temperature varies between the average minimum of 18 °C and the average maximum of 31 °C. Annual rainfall is 1,500 milliliters.

Districts, Villages, and Hamlets

- Hamlets: Cocalândia, Cruzeirinho and Jacinópolis

=== Political and Demographic Data ===
- Eligible voters: 23,813 (11/2007)
- Mayor: Maysa Cunha
- Vice-mayor: Leo Contador
- Councilmembers: 11
- Population growth rate 2000/2007: -0.11.%
- Population in 1980: 27,248
- Population in 2007: 31,060
- Population in 2022: 35,684 (IBGE)
- Urban population in 2007: 28,316
- Rural population in 2007: 2,744 (Sepin)

== Economy ==
Commerce is the main economic activity with over 458 enterprises registered (2007). Cattle raising is also important with 92,000 head registered. The dairy industry (16,000 milking cows) is especially vibrant with three milk companies operating in the region. In addition there is a large poultry industry with 70,000 birds registered in 2006. The main agricultural products were corn (1,300 hectares), manioc, rice, bananas, and soy beans (1,000 hectares).

Economic Data

- Industrial units: 59 (06/2007)
- Retail units: 458 (2007)
- Banking institutions: - Banco do Brasil S.A. - BRADESCO S.A. - Banco Itaú S.A. - CEF - (08/2007)
- Dairies: Laticínios Morrinhos Ind. e Com. Ltda.; - Laticínios Caetano Ltda (08/2007)
- Industrial zone: Distrito Agroindustrial - DAIPO (Jan/2005)
- GDP (PIB)(R$1,000.00): 157,759 (2005)

Motor Vehicles

- Automobiles: 4,526
- Pickup trucks: 1,146
- Number of inhabitants per motor vehicle: 5.4

There were 5,781 motorcycles and motorbikes in the city in 2007.

Agricultural data 2006

- Farms: 1,002
- Total area: 84,199 ha.
- Area of permanent crops: 134 ha.
- Area of perennial crops: 2,051 ha.
- Area of natural pasture: 68,057 ha.
- Area of woodland and forests: 12,073 ha.
- Persons dependent on farming: 2,700
- Farms with tractors: 94
- Number of tractors: 120
- Cattle herd: 92,000 head IBGE

Main crops in hectares 2006

- Rice: 250
- Banana: 34
- Sugarcane: 10
- Coconut: 9
- Manioc: 300
- Corn: 1,200
- Soybeans: 1,000
- Sorghum: 220

== Education and Health ==
- Literacy rate: 87.5%
- Infant mortality rate: 17.12 in 1,000 live births
- Schools: 33 (2007)
- Students: 9,145
- Higher education: UEG (Goiás University State), IFGO (Goiano Federal Institute), FAI (Iporá College).
- Hospitals: 5 (02/2007)
- Hospital beds: 203

(Sepin)

- Municipal Human Development Index: 0.780
- State ranking: 32 (out of 442 municipalities in 2000)
- National ranking: 1,074 (out of 5,507 municipalities in 2000)

For the complete list see Frigoletto.com.br

== See also ==
- List of municipalities in Goiás
- Microregions of Goiás
