= Nazário =

- Municipality
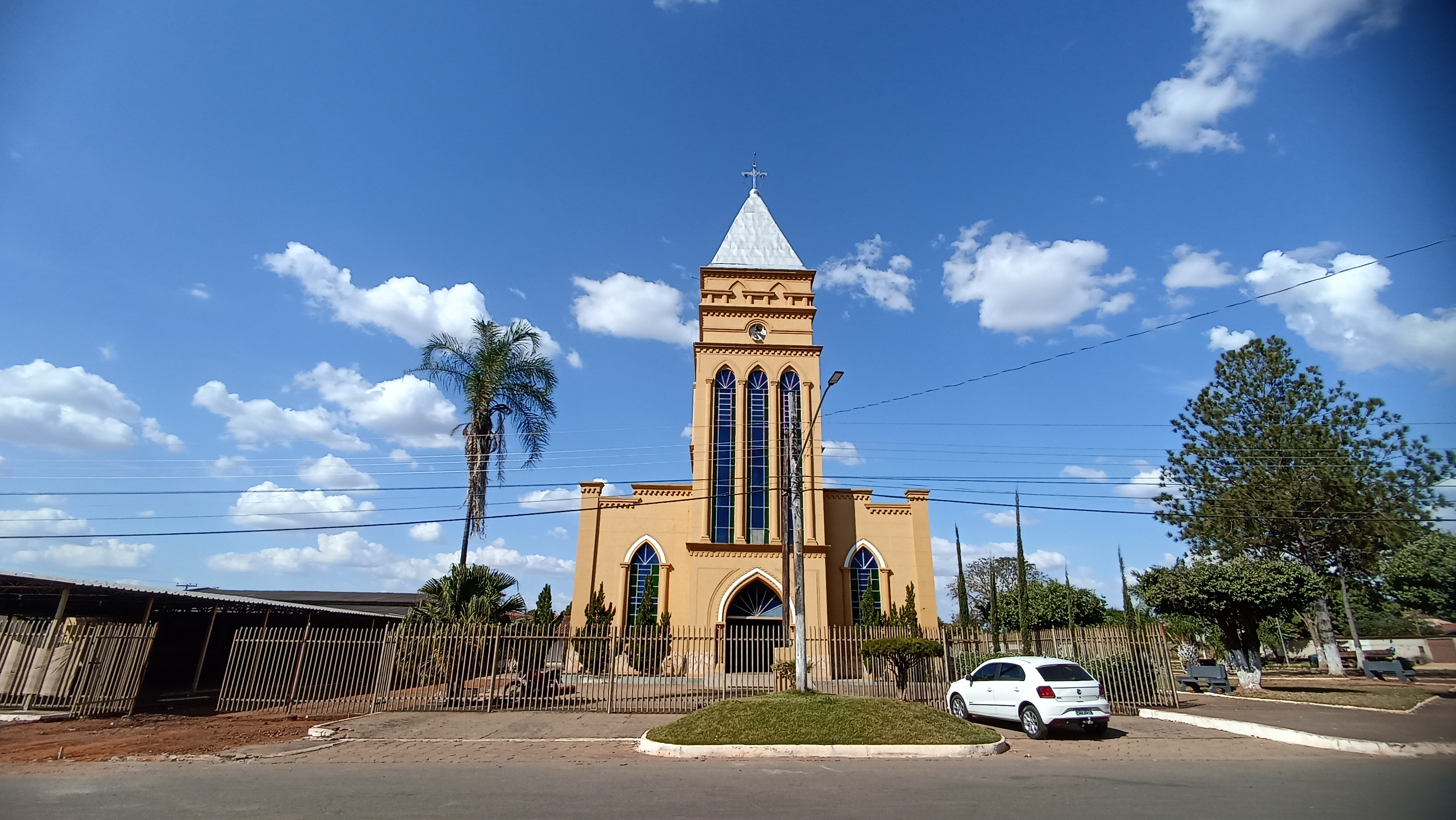

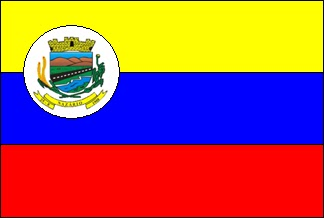
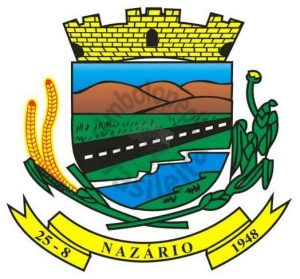
- Flag Coat of arms

- Location in Goiás state

- Location in Brazil
- Coordinates: 16°35′05″S 49°52′55″W
- Country: Brazil
- Region: Central-West
- State: Goiás
- Microregion: Anicuns Microregion

Area
  - Total: 300.1 km^{2} (115.9 sq mi)
- Elevation: 615 m (2,018 ft)

Population (2020)
  - Total: 9,260
  - Density: 30.9/km^{2} (79.9/sq mi)
- Time zone: UTC−3 (BRT)
- Postal code: 76180-000

Nazário is a municipality in eastern Goiás state, Brazil.

== Location ==
Nazário is located 74 km west of the state capital, Goiânia a few kilometers west of the Rio dos Bois, a major tributary of the Paranaíba River. The regional center, Anicuns, is 21 km to the northwest. Highway connections from Goiânia are made by state highway BR-069 west from Goiânia, through Trindade, Santa Bárbara de Goiás, and then 12 kilometers west to Nazário. Neighboring municipalities are Turvânia, Anicuns, Avelinópolis, and Santa Bárbara de Goiás

== Demographics ==
In 2007 there were 6,702 people living in the urban area and 521 living in the rural area. The population has increased by about 1,000 people since 1980. Between 2000 and 2007 the geometric population growth rate was 1.23.%.

== The economy ==
The economy was based on agriculture, cattle raising, services, and a small number of modest transformation industries. There was 1 meat-packing plant—Gelnex Indústria e Comércio Ltda—and 1 banking institution—Banco Itaú S.A.

In 2007 there were 39,600 head of cattle. The main agricultural products were rice, bananas, coffee, sugarcane, beans, oranges, manioc, and corn. Corn was the only crop with more than 1,000 planted hectares.

== Health and education ==
The health sector was modest with 1 hospital (18 beds). The infant mortality rate was 16.30, well below the national rate of 35.0 in 2000. the educational sector was composed of

The school system had 6 schools and 2,236 students (2006). There were no institutions of higher learning. The adult literacy rate was 87.0%, higher than the national average of 86.4% in 2000.

== History ==
The name of the town comes from the first name of its founder, Nazário de Pereira Oliveira, who first settled in the region in the nineteenth century. He built the first house at the meeting of the waterways Córrego dos Buriti and Rio dos Bois. Later a chapel was erected in honor of Our Lady of the Conception. Moved by religious faith several families arrived and by 1930 the settlement took on the name of Nazário. At first it was a district of the now extinct municipality of Novo Horizonte, which later, in 1938 became Anicuns. In 1948 Nazário got its emancipation and became an independent municipality.

Ranking on the Municipal Human Development Index

- MHDI: 0.765
- State ranking: 47 (out of 242 municipalities)
- National ranking: 1,459 (out of 5,507 municipalities)

For the complete list see frigoletto.com.br

== See also ==
- List of municipalities in Goiás
- Microregions of Goiás
