= Turvânia =

- Municipality
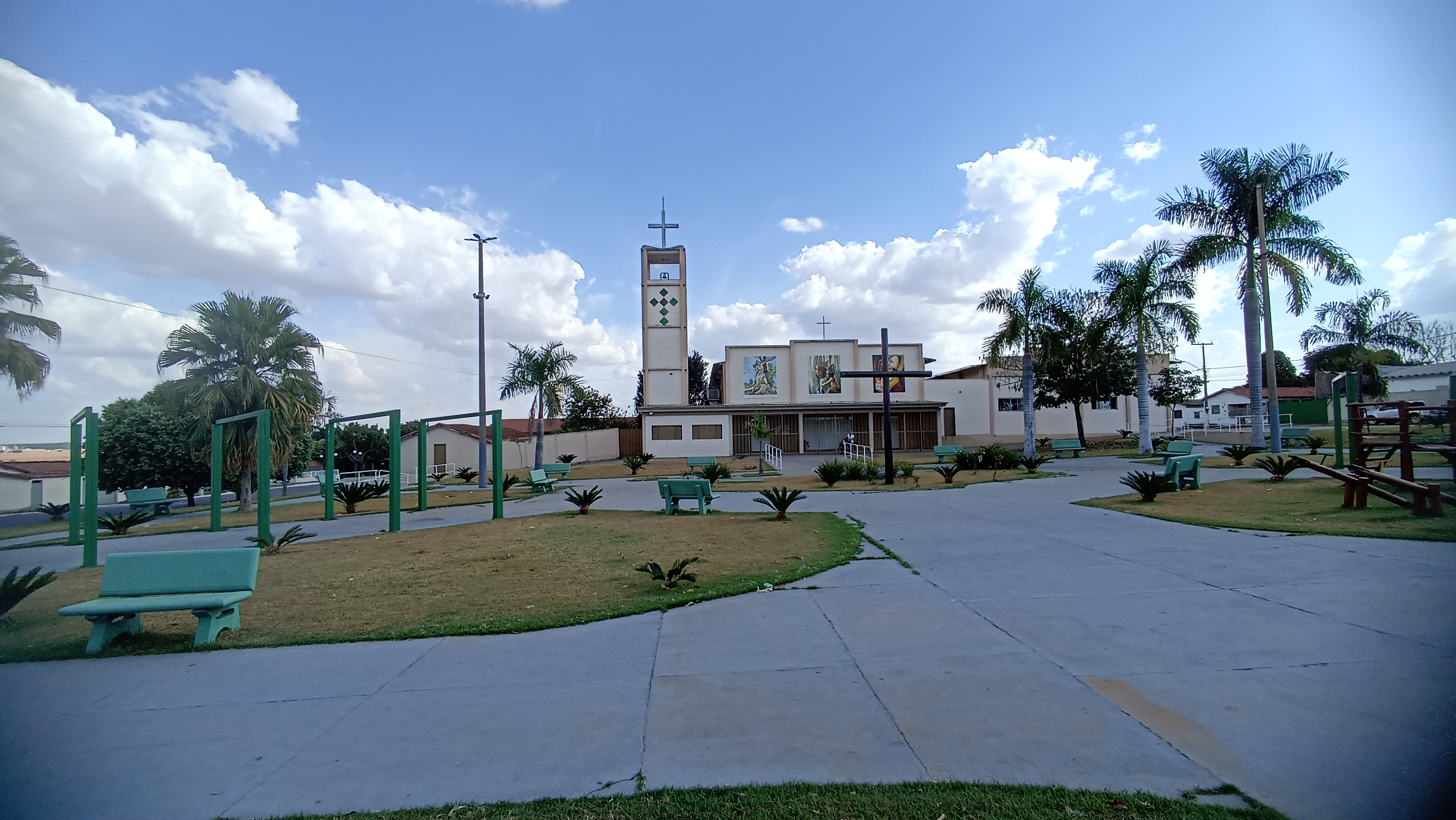

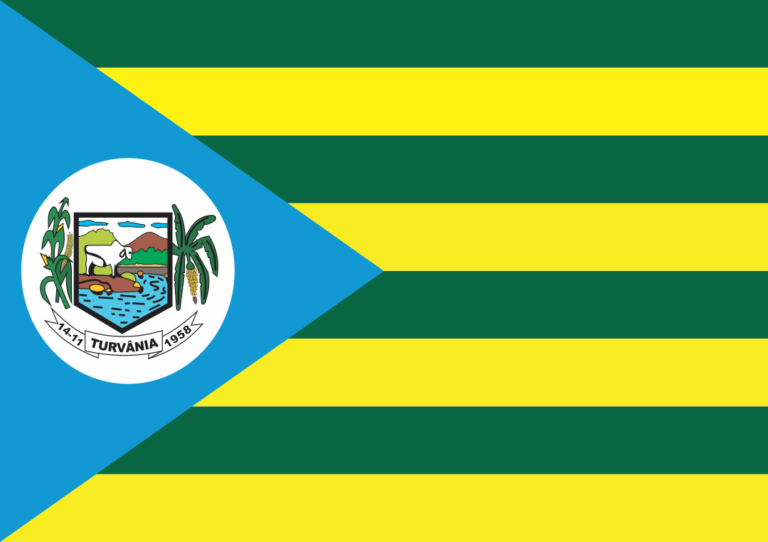
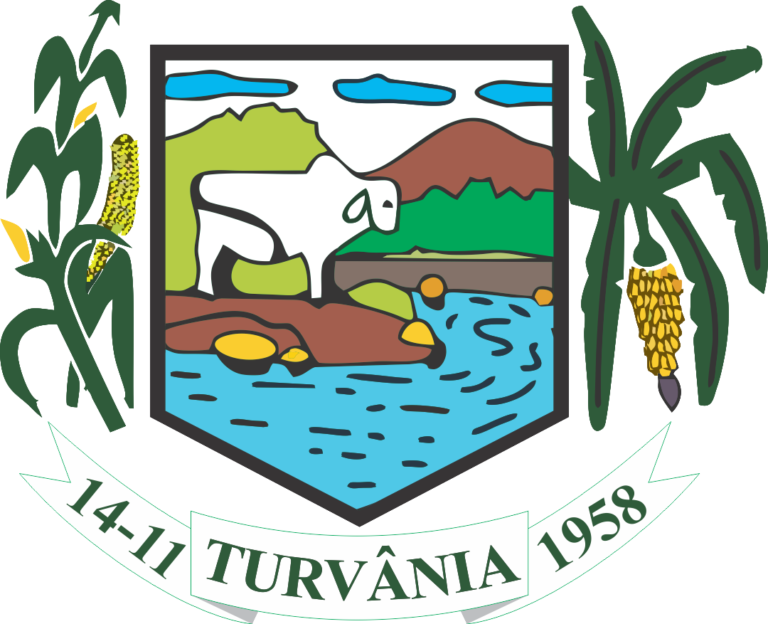
- Flag Coat of arms

- Location in Goiás state

- Location in Brazil
- Coordinates: 16°36′23″S 50°08′14″W
- Country: Brazil
- Region: Central-West
- State: Goiás
- Microregion: Anicuns Microregion

Area
  - Total: 472.3 km^{2} (182.4 sq mi)
- Elevation: 659 m (2,162 ft)

Population (2020)
  - Total: 4,564
  - Density: 9.663/km^{2} (25.03/sq mi)
- Time zone: UTC−3 (BRT)
- Postal code: 76110-000

Turvânia is a municipality in eastern Goiás state, Brazil.

== Location ==
Turvânia is located west of Goiânia, 28 km (17 mi) east of São Luís de Montes Belos. Highway connections from Goiânia are made by state highway BR-069 west from Goiânia, through Trindade, Santa Bárbara de Goiás, and then 50 kilometers west to Turvânia. Neighboring municipalities are Firminópolis, São Luís de Montes Belos, Adelândia, Nazário and Anicuns.

== Demographics ==
The population density was 10.51 people/km^{2} (27.2 people/mi^{2}) (2007). The urban population was 4,036 (2007) and the rural population was 926.

== The economy ==
The economy is based on subsistence agriculture, cattle raising, services, public administration, and small transformation industries. There was one dairy in 2007. The cattle herd had 65,000 (2006). The main crops were rice, bananas, sugarcane (2,200 hectares; 5,400 ac), beans, manioc, corn, tomatoes, and soybeans.

== Health and education ==
The adult literacy rate was 85.5% (2000) (the national average was 86.4%). There were 2 hospitals with 37 beds. The infant mortality rate was 26.08 (2000) (the national average was 33.0). The classification on the Municipal Human Development Index was 0.736 (state ranking: 122 out of 242 municipalities and national ranking of 1,267 out of 5,507 municipalities. For the complete list see frigoletto.com.br

== History ==
Turvânia began in 1930 with the establishment of a settlement called Poções, from the nearby stream. The site originally had a cemetery called "por enquanto" (for the time being). In 1943 land was donated to build a chapel and the first constructions and streets appeared. In the beginning progress was difficult because of malaria, the lack of medicine and roads. In 1958 it became a municipality with the name "Turvânia" because of the Turvo River that crosses the region. Source: Sepin

== See also ==
- List of municipalities in Goiás
- Microregions in Goiás
