= Israelândia =

- Municipality
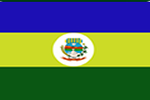
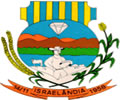
- Flag Coat of arms

- Location in Goiás state

- Location in Brazil
- Coordinates: 16°19′32″S 50°53′58″W
- Country: Brazil
- Region: Central-West
- State: Goiás
- Microregion: Iporá Microregion

Area
  - Total: 577.4 km^{2} (222.9 sq mi)
- Elevation: 378 m (1,240 ft)

Population (2020)
  - Total: 2,786
  - Density: 4.825/km^{2} (12.50/sq mi)
- Time zone: UTC−3 (BRT)
- Postal code: 76205-000

Israelândia is a municipality in eastern Goiás state, Brazil.

== Location ==
Israelândia is located in the Iporá Microregion, 28 km. northeast of regional center Iporá. State capital Goiânia is 199 km. to the east. The Rio Claro, a tributary of the Rio Araguaia, flows through the municipality. Highway connections with Goiânia are made by taking state highway BR-069 west from Goiânia, through Trindade, São Luís de Montes Belos, and then 31 kilometers northeast to Amorinópolis. Neighboring municipalities: Jaupaci, Fazenda Nova, Moiporá, and Iporá.

Districts, villages, and hamlets

- District: Piloândia

== Demographics ==
- Population growth rate 1996/2007: -1.69%
- Population in 1980: 3,583
- Population in 2007: 2,827
- Urban population in 2007: 2,137
- Rural population in 2007: 690 (Sepin)

== The economy ==
The economy is based on services, small industries, cattle raising, and agriculture. There were 2 industrial establishments and 25 retail establishments in 2007. The cattle herd had 50,000 head. The main crops are rice, bananas, manioc, and corn, all in modest planted areas.

- GDP (PIB)(R$1,000.00): 17,792 (2005)
- GDP per capita (R$1.00): 6,393 (2005)

Motor Vehicles

- Automobiles: 132
- Pickup trucks: 21
- Number of inhabitants per motor vehicle: 18.4

Agricultural data 2006

- Farms: 290
- Total area: 52,914 ha.
- Area of permanent crops: 118 ha.
- Area of perennial crops: 742 ha.
- Area of natural pasture: 38,152 ha.
- Area of woodland and forests: 12,586 ha.
- Persons dependent on farming: 1,200
- Farms with tractors: 41
- Number of tractors: 54
- Cattle herd: 50,000 head

== Education and Health(2006) ==
In 2006 there were 3 schools in activity with 788 students. There was one hospital with 20 beds. The literacy rate was 84.5% while the infant mortality rate was 24.39 in 1,000 live births. The score on the Municipal Human Development Index was 0.730.

== History ==
The history of Israelândia begins in 1942 when Fernando Martins Marques discovered gold and diamonds in the Rio Claro. The first name was Monchão do Vaz when the village became a district of Iporá in 1953. In 1958 it achieved municipal status and took the name Israelândia, in honor of Israel de Amorim, who fought for its autonomy.

== See also ==
- List of municipalities in Goiás

Microregions of Goiás
