= Avelinópolis =

- Municipality
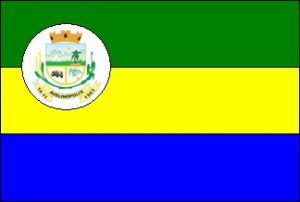
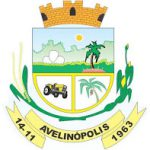
- Flag Coat of arms

- Location in Goiás state

- Location in Brazil
- Coordinates: 16°27′S 49°45′W
- Country: Brazil
- Region: Central-West
- State: Goiás
- Microregion: Anicuns Microregion

Area
  - Total: 164.6 km^{2} (63.6 sq mi)
- Elevation: 729 m (2,392 ft)

Population (2020)
  - Total: 2,409
  - Density: 14.64/km^{2} (37.91/sq mi)
- Time zone: UTC−3 (BRT)
- Postal code: 75395-000

Avelinópolis is a municipality in eastern Goiás state, Brazil.

== Communications and Location ==
The distance to the regional center of (Anicuns)is 26 km. Highway connections from the state capital are made by state highway BR-069 west from Goiânia, through Trindade, Santa Bárbara de Goiás, and then 25 kilometers northwest to Avelinópolis. Neighboring municipalities are Santa Bárbara de Goiás, Anicuns, Nazário, Araçu, and Americano do Brasil.

== Demographic and Political Data ==
- Population density: 14.48 inhabitants/km^{2} (2007)
- Population growth rate 2000/2007: -0.77%
- Urban population in 2007: 1,804
- Rural population in 2007: 571 (In 1980 the rural population was greater than the urban: 1,449 rural and 1,238 urban.)
- Eligible voters: 2,717(12/2007)
- City government in 2005: mayor (Waltenir Peixoto de Miranda), vice-mayor (Leonardo Protásio Evangelista da Rocha), and 09 councilmembers

== Economy ==
The main economic activities were cattle raising, agriculture, commerce, and small transformation industries. There was a substantial informal economy. The largest employer was public administration. There were 29,000 head of cattle (8,000 dairy cows) in 2006. The poultry industry was important with over 170,000 chicks registered in 2006. The main agricultural products in 2006 were bananas, coffee, oranges, rice, sugarcane, beans, manioc, corn, and tomatoes.

In 2007 there were 260 automobiles and pickup trucks, giving a ratio of 9 inhabitants for each motor vehicle.

== Health and education ==
- Infant mortality in 2000: 23.49
- Infant mortality in 1990: 43.64
- Hospitals: 01 with 16 beds (2006)
- Literacy rate in 2000: 82.8
- Schools and Student Enrollment: 2, 709 (2006)
- Higher education: none reported for 2007
- MHDI: 0.736
- State ranking: 121 (out of 242 municipalities)
- National ranking: 2,261 (out of 5,507 municipalities)

For the complete list see frigoletto.com.br

== See also ==
- List of municipalities in Goiás
- Microregions of Goiás
