= Buriti de Goiás =

- Municipality
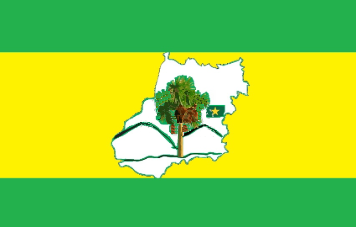
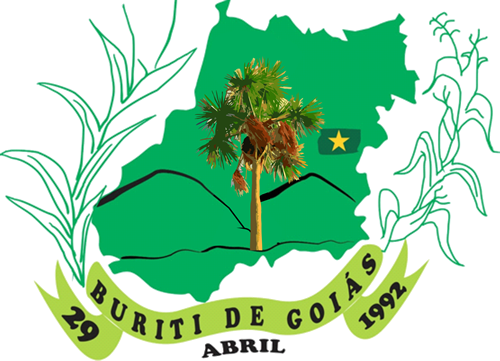
- Flag Coat of arms

- Location in Goiás state

- Location in Brazil
- Coordinates: 16°09′S 50°26′W
- Country: Brazil
- Region: Central-West
- State: Goiás
- Microregion: Anicuns Microregion

Area
  - Total: 200.0 km^{2} (77.2 sq mi)
- Elevation: 520 m (1,710 ft)

Population (2020)
  - Total: 2,476
  - Density: 12.38/km^{2} (32.06/sq mi)
- Time zone: UTC−3 (BRT)
- Postal code: 76152-000

Buriti de Goiás is a municipality in eastern Goiás state, Brazil.

== Location and Communications ==
- Distance to regional center (São Luís de Montes Belos): 58 km.

Highway connections are made by state highway BR-069 west from Goiânia, through Trindade, Santa Bárbara de Goiás, São Luís de Montes Belos, and then 58 kilometers northeast to Buriti de Goiás. Neighboring municipalities are Córrego do Ouro, Fazenda Nova, Novo Brasil, Goiás, Mossâmedes, and Sanclerlândia.

The municipality contains part of the 26,626-hectare (65,790-acre) Serra Dourada State Park, created in 2003.

== Demographics ==
- Population density in 2007: 11.23 inhabitants/km^{2}
- Population growth rate 2000-2007: -2.43%
- Urban population in 2007: 1,487
- Rural population in 2007: 751
- Eligible voters in 2007: 2638
- City government in 2007: mayor (Altamiro Antônio da Silva), vice-mayor (José Sérgio Magno), and 09 councilpersons
- Income distribution: In 823 households, 407 earned less than one minimum salary in 2000.

== Economy ==
The economy is based on cattle raising, agriculture and small transformation industries. In 2006 there were 24,000 head of cattle, including 3,570 head of milking cows. There was modest production of rice, bananas, coconut, papaya, manioc, corn, and hearts of palm.

== Health and education ==
- Infant mortality in 2000: 24.88
- Hospitals: 01 with 14 beds (2007)
- Literacy rate: 86.8 in 2000
- Schools: 03 in 2006
- Students: 765
- Higher education: none in 2006
- MHDI: 0.731
- State ranking: 142 (out of 242 municipalities)
- National ranking: 2396 (out of 5507 municipalities)

== See also ==
- List of municipalities in Goiás
- Microregions of Goiás
