= Ary Ribeiro Valadão =

Brazilian politician (1918–2021)

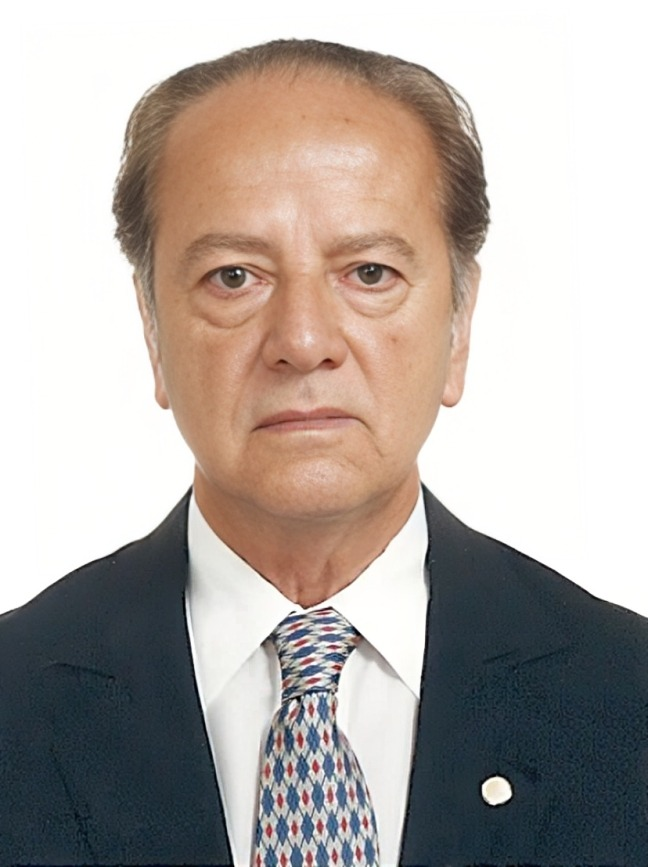

Governor of Goiás
- In office 1979–1983
- Preceded by: Irapuan Costa Júnior
- Succeeded by: Iris Rezende

Member of the Chamber of Deputies of Brazil
- In office 1989–1991
- Constituency: Tocantins
- In office 1967–1979
- Constituency: Goiás

Member of the Legislative Assembly of Goiás
- In office 1959–1967

Mayor of Anicuns
- In office 1955–1959
- In office 1947–1951

Personal details
- Born: 14 November 1918; Anicuns, Brazil
- Died: 9 August 2021 (aged 102); Goiânia, Brazil
- Political party: UDN; ARENA; PDS; PPR; PP; PODE

Ary Ribeiro Valadão (14 November 1918 – 9 August 2021) was a Brazilian politician, farmer, and lawyer. He served in the Chamber of Deputies of Brazil and as Governor of Goiás.

== Biography ==
Ary was the son of Benedito Teodoro Valadão and Emília Parrodi Valadão. He began his career as a farmer and industrial worker before joining the National Democratic Union and being elected Mayor of Anicuns, serving from 1947 to 1951 and again from 1955 to 1959. He served in the Legislative Assembly of Goiás from 1959 to 1967. A graduate of the Federal University of Goiás, he also worked as a lawyer.

Valadão was elected to the Chamber of Deputies in 1967, representing Goiás until 1979. That year, he was selected by President Ernesto Geisel to serve as Governor of Goiás for a four-year term. In 1989, he rejoined the Chamber of Deputies, this time representing Tocantins and serving until 1991. In 1994, he was elected as an alternate deputy for the Reform Progressive Party.

He was married to Maria Valadão, who served in the Chamber of Deputies for Goiás from 1990 to 1994.

Ary Ribeiro Valadão died in Goiânia on 9 August 2021 at the age of 102.
