= Córrego do Ouro =

- Municipality
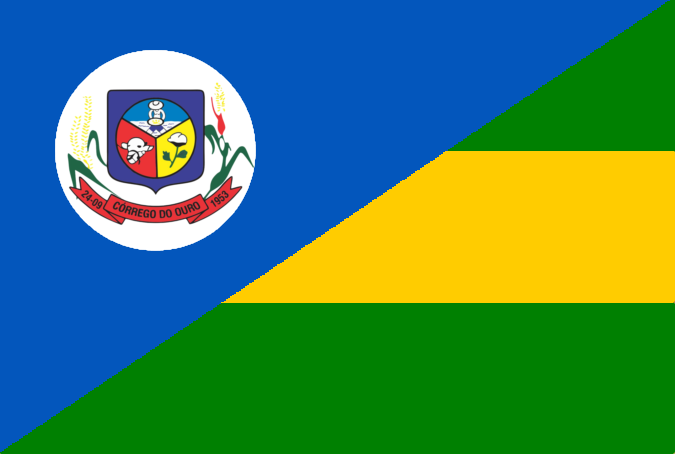
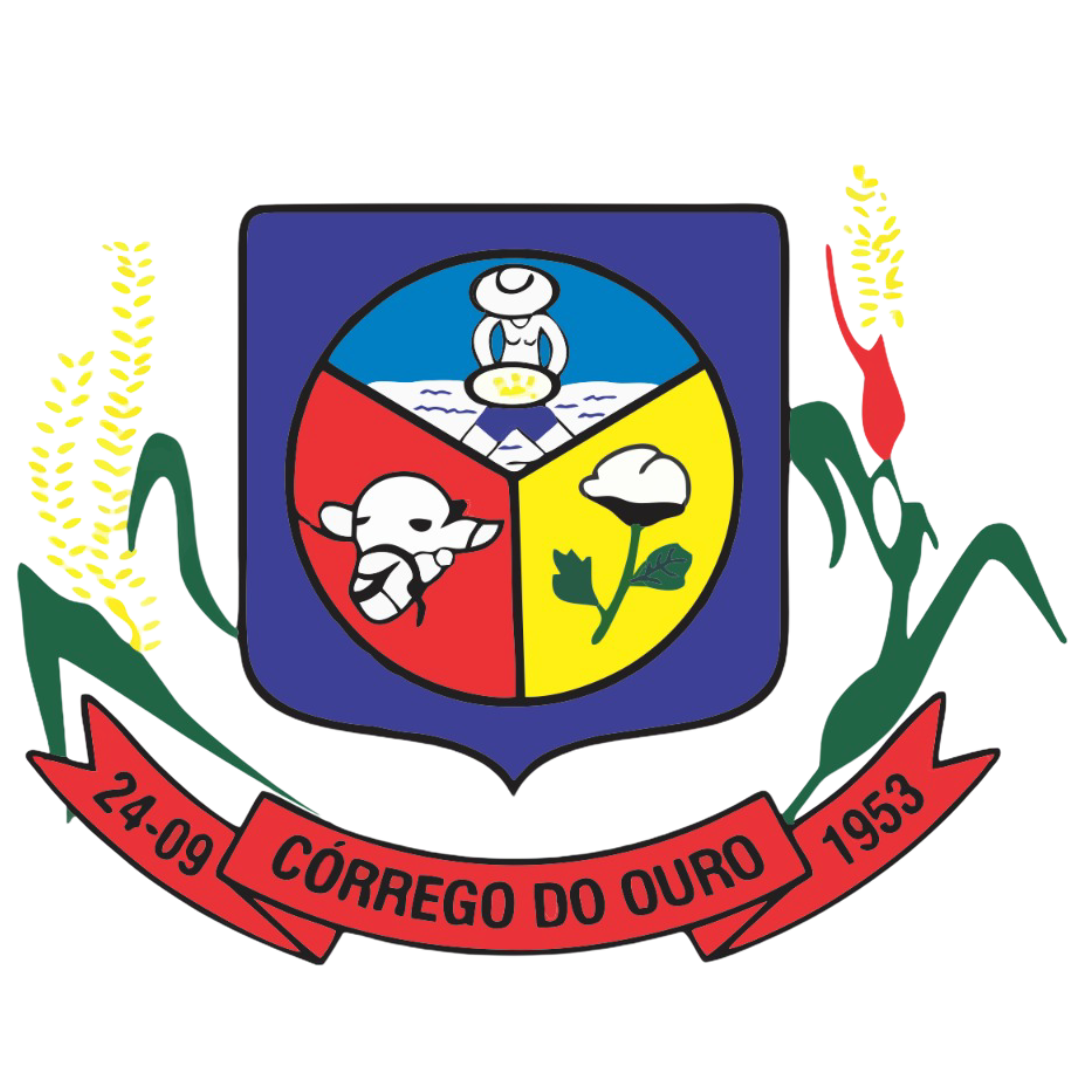
- Flag Coat of arms

- Location in Goiás state

- Location in Brazil
- Coordinates: 16°38′50″S 50°32′52″W
- Country: Brazil
- Region: Central-West
- State: Goiás
- Microregion: Iporá Microregion

Area
  - Total: 463.9 km^{2} (179.1 sq mi)
- Elevation: 563 m (1,847 ft)

Population (2020)
  - Total: 2,290
  - Density: 4.94/km^{2} (12.8/sq mi)
- Time zone: UTC−3 (BRT)
- Postal code: 76145-000

Córrego do Ouro is a municipality in eastern Goiás state, Brazil.

== Location and Highway Connections ==
Córrego do Ouro is located in the Iporá Microregion west of the state capital, Goiânia. It is 45 km. northwest of São Luís de Montes Belos, the largest town in the region. Goiânia lies at a distance of 171 km. Highway connections from Goiânia were made by GO-060 / Trindade / Claudinápolis (district) / GO-326 / Anicuns / GO-222 / GO-326 / Sanclerlândia / Buriti de Goiás / GO-518. Seplan. Neighboring municipalities: Moiporá, Israelândia, Fazenda Nova, Novo Brasil, Buriti de Goiás, and Adelândia

== Demographics ==
- Population in 1980: 4,367
- Population in 2007: 2,633
- Urban population: 1,571
- Rural population: 1,062
- Population growth rate: -1.77%

== The economy ==
The main economic activities were cattle raising (64,200 in 2006) and agriculture. Main crops were rice, bananas, and corn. There was one dairy: Laticínios Farlat - Indústria e Comércio Ltda (2007)

- GDP (R$1,000.00) in 2005: 18,252
- Per capita GDP (R$1.00) in 2005: 6,577

Agricultural data 2006

- Farms: 368
- Total area: 40,656 ha.
- Area of permanent crops: 299 ha.
- Area of perennial crops: 496 ha.
- Area of natural pasture: 29,174 ha.
- Area of woodland and forests: 9,691 ha.
- Persons dependent on farming: 900
- Farms with tractors: 27
- Number of tractors: 29
- Cattle herd: 54,200 head

== Health and education ==
- Literacy rate: 85.6% (2000)
- Schools: 4 (2007)
- Students: 728
- Infant mortality rate: 27.14 in 1,000 live births (2000)
- Hospitals: 1 with 16 beds
- Municipal Human Development Index: 0.726

== History ==
The history of Córrego do Ouro began in 1934 with the dynamism of Padre Alexandre Pereira. A bridge was built across the Rio Fartura and the population began to grow. In 1948 it was raised to the status of district belonging to Goiás to be granted autonomy in 1953.

== See also ==
- List of municipalities in Goiás
- Microregions of Goiás
