= Sanclerlândia =

- Municipality
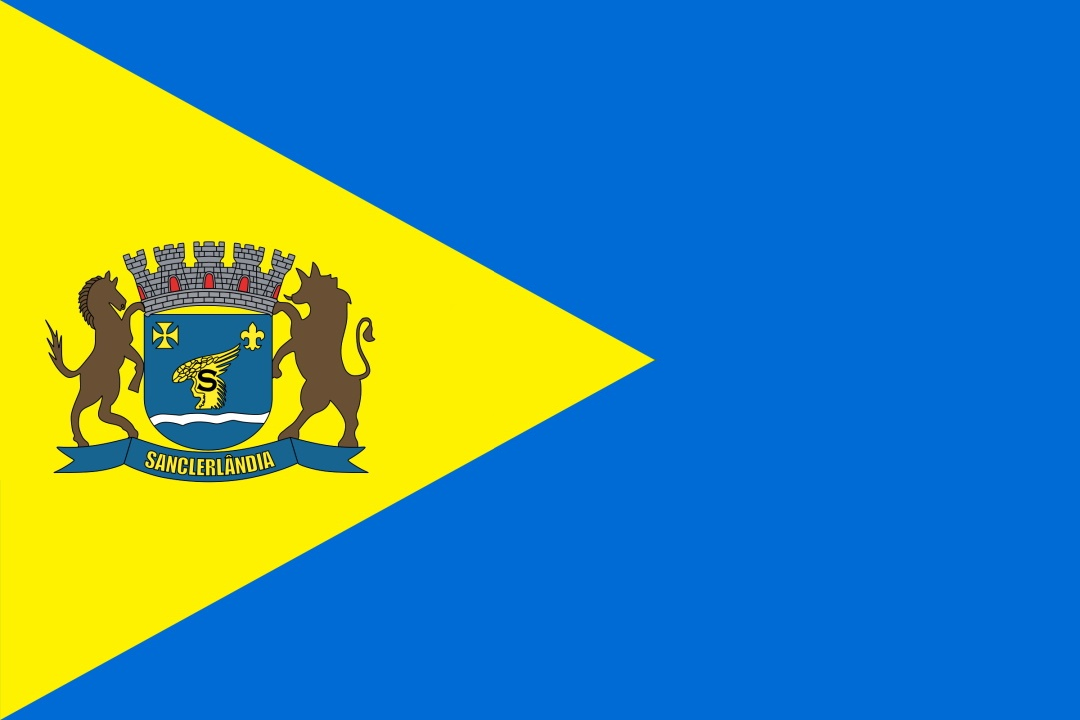
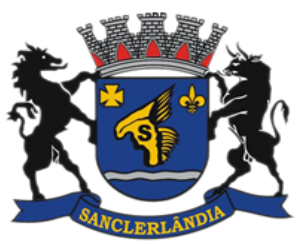
- Flag Coat of arms

- Location in Goiás state

- Location in Brazil
- Coordinates: 16°12′06″S 50°18′39″W
- Country: Brazil
- Region: Central-West
- State: Goiás
- Microregion: Anicuns Microregion

Area
  - Total: 496.8 km^{2} (191.8 sq mi)
- Elevation: 607 m (1,991 ft)

Population (2020)
  - Total: 7,632
  - Density: 15.36/km^{2} (39.79/sq mi)
- Time zone: UTC−3 (BRT)
- Postal code: 76160-000

Sanclerlândia (Portuguese pronunciation: [sãkleʁˈlãdʒjɐ]) is a municipality in western Goiás state, Brazil. The population was 7,641 in 2005 and the total area of the municipality was 496.8 km^{2}.

Panorama of Sanclerlandia

== Location ==
Sanclerlândia belongs to the Anicuns Microregion and is northwest of the state capital, Goiânia. It has paved road connections with Itaberaí and São Luís de Montes Belos. Neighboring municipalities are Buriti de Goiás, Mossâmedes, São Luís de Montes Belos, Adelândia, and Córrego do Ouro. The distance to Goiânia is 134 km. Highway connections are made by GO-060 / Trindade / GO-326 / Anicuns / GO-222 / GO-326 / Choupana.

== Demographics ==
The population density was 15.39 inhabitants/km^{2} (2007). There were 6,038 people living in urban areas and 1,609 living in rural areas (2007). Over the past two years the population has risen due to the establishment of several new industries in the town.

== The economy ==
The economy consists primalriy on the production from the agriculture farms surrounding the town (rice, bananas, and corn), cattle raising is a major cornerstone to the local economy (74,170 head in 2006). In addition there are numerous services in public administration, and small locally run industries. In 2007 there were three financial institutions. The main industries established in the town are, LeitBom milk factory (being the largest and longest established industry in the town) followed by several medium-sized clothing factories producing a wide range of clothing for nationally known labels.

Panorama of the centre of Sanclerlandia

== Health and education ==
In the educational area there is a campus of the UEG - faculdade Estadual de Agronomia e Zootecnia de Sanclerlândia. The adult literacy rate was 85.3% (2000) (national average was 86.4%). In 2006 there were 2 hospitals with 63 beds. The infant mortality rate was 23.49 (2000) (the national average was 33.0)

- The Municipal Human Development Index was 0.734
- State ranking: 129 (out of 242 municipalities)
- National ranking: 2,324 (out of 5,507 municipalities)

== History ==
Sanclerlândia was founded in 1943 with a handful of people settling along the highway connecting Goiânia and Córrego do Ouro. The first few dwellings were simple and consisted of several homes and a general store. Soon other homes appeared and the town quickly took shape drawing more and more people to the area. In 1958, the settlement was called Officially named Sanclerlândia. The municipality received emancipation in 1963. Today the city is most commonly known for the statewide competition hosted there every year called "Jeep Cross" the annual Jeep Competition.

== See also ==
- List of municipalities in Goiás
- Microregions of Goiás
