= Adelândia =

- Municipality
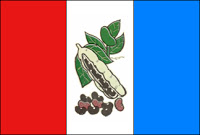
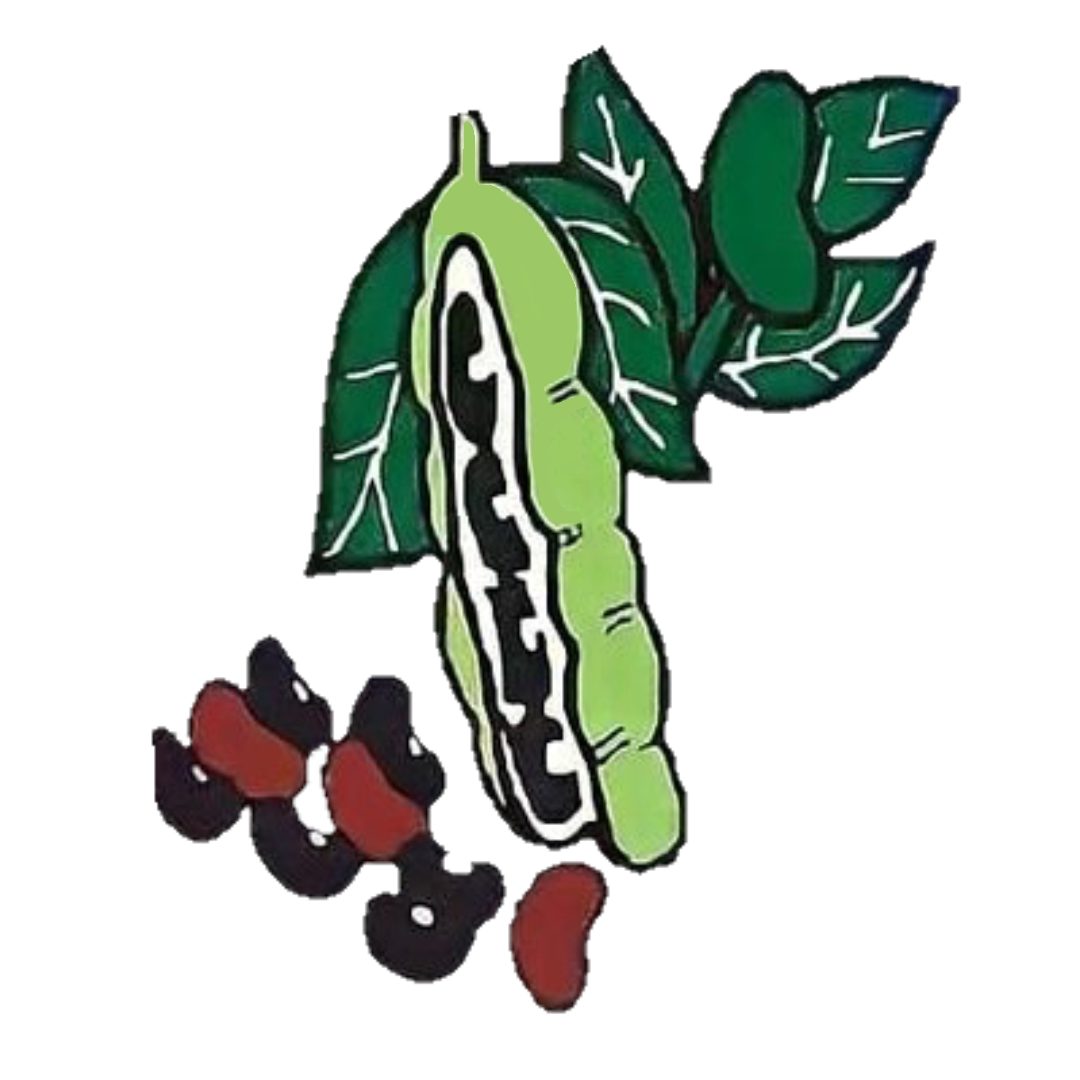
- Flag Coat of arms

- Location in Goiás state

- Location in Brazil
- Coordinates: 16°23′39″S 50°10′04″W
- Country: Brazil
- Region: Central-West
- State: Goiás
- Microregion: Anicuns Microregion

Area
  - Total: 115.7 km^{2} (44.7 sq mi)
- Elevation: 649 m (2,129 ft)

Population (2020)
  - Total: 2,516
  - Density: 21.75/km^{2} (56.32/sq mi)
- Time zone: UTC−3 (BRT)
- Postal code: 76155-000

Adelândia is a municipality in eastern Goiás state, Brazil.

== Location ==
The distance to the state capital Goiânia is 129 km. while the distance to the regional center São Luís de Montes Belos is 6 km. Highway connections are made by state highway BR-069 west from Goiânia, through Trindade, São Luís de Montes Belos, and then 6 kilometers to Adelândia. Neighboring municipalities are Mossâmedes, Anicuns, Turvânia, São Luís de Montes Belos, and Sanclerlândia.

== Political Information ==
The number of registered voters was 1971 (09/06/2004) while the mayor was Mauricio Martins de Freitas), vice-mayor (Adma Duarte Gomes e Silva), and there were 9 council members.

The ex-mayor Lourival de Assis Lobo (1951-2007) was the first independent mayor of the city and the emancipator. His first lady was D. Luciene Rocha Malheiros Lobo.

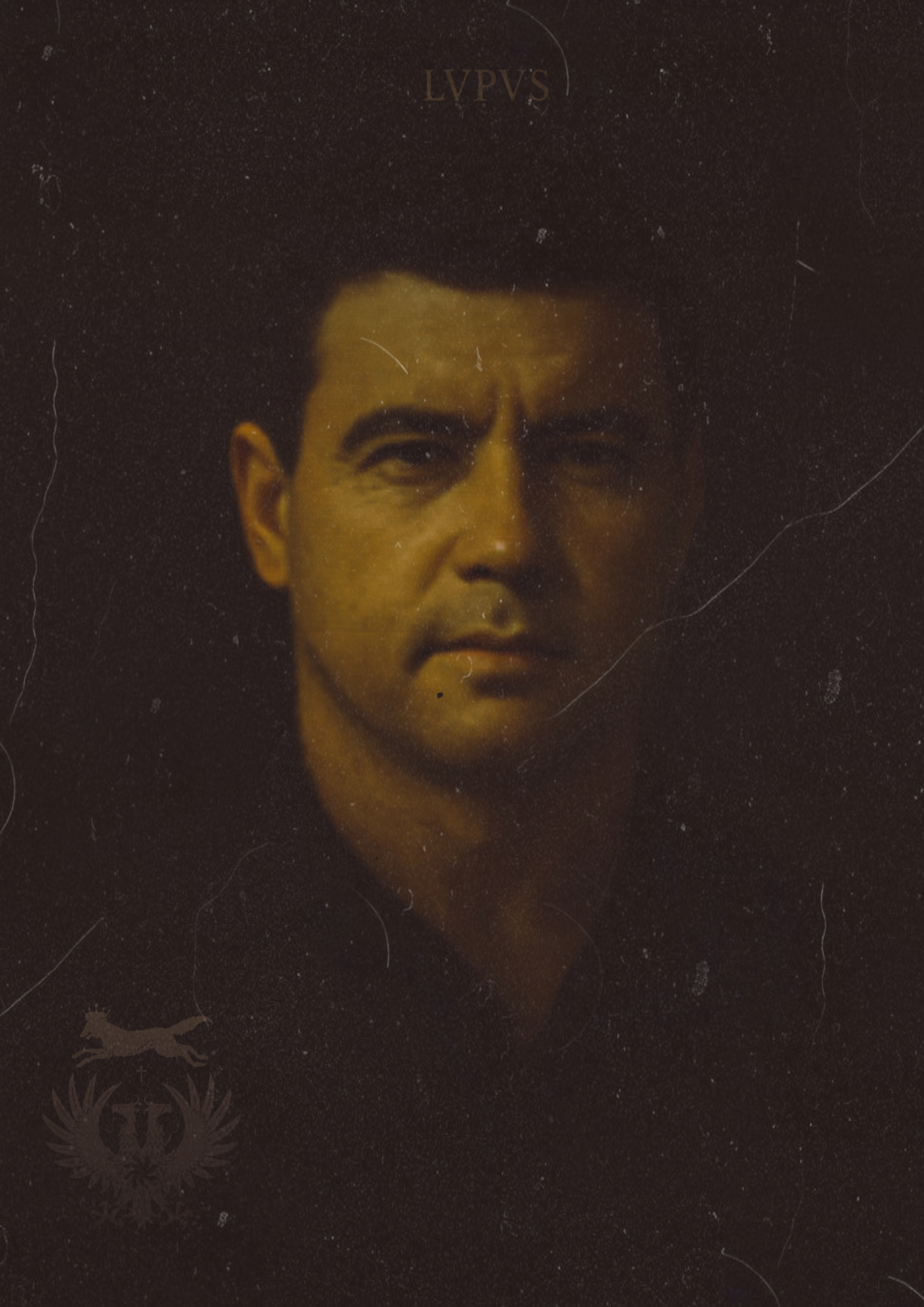
Lourival de Assis Lobo

He had seven descendants in his lineage: Fabio Lobo, Renata Lobo, Patricia Lobo, Elmo Lobo, Lourival Filho, Raphael Lobo and Yuri Lobo.

== The economy ==
The economy is based on cattle raising and growing of corn, bananas, and beans. There is also some wood extraction and transformation. The size of the cattle herd was 12,331 head.

== Health and education ==
The infant mortality rate in 2000 was 24.88. There was 1 small hospital in 2002 with 22 beds, 4 doctors and 2 nurses. In the educational sector there were 2 primary schools with 527 students (2004) and 1 middle school (State College Francisco de Assis Lobo Sobrinho) with 143 students. The literacy rate in 2000 was 80.9%. (Source: IBGE)

Adelândia had a score of 0.715 on the Municipal Human Development Index, giving it a state ranking of 184 (out of 242 municipalities) and a national ranking of 2,712 (out of 5,507 municipalities). (All data are from 2000)

== See also ==
- List of municipalities in Goiás
- Microregions in Goiás
