= Santa Bárbara de Goiás =

- Municipality
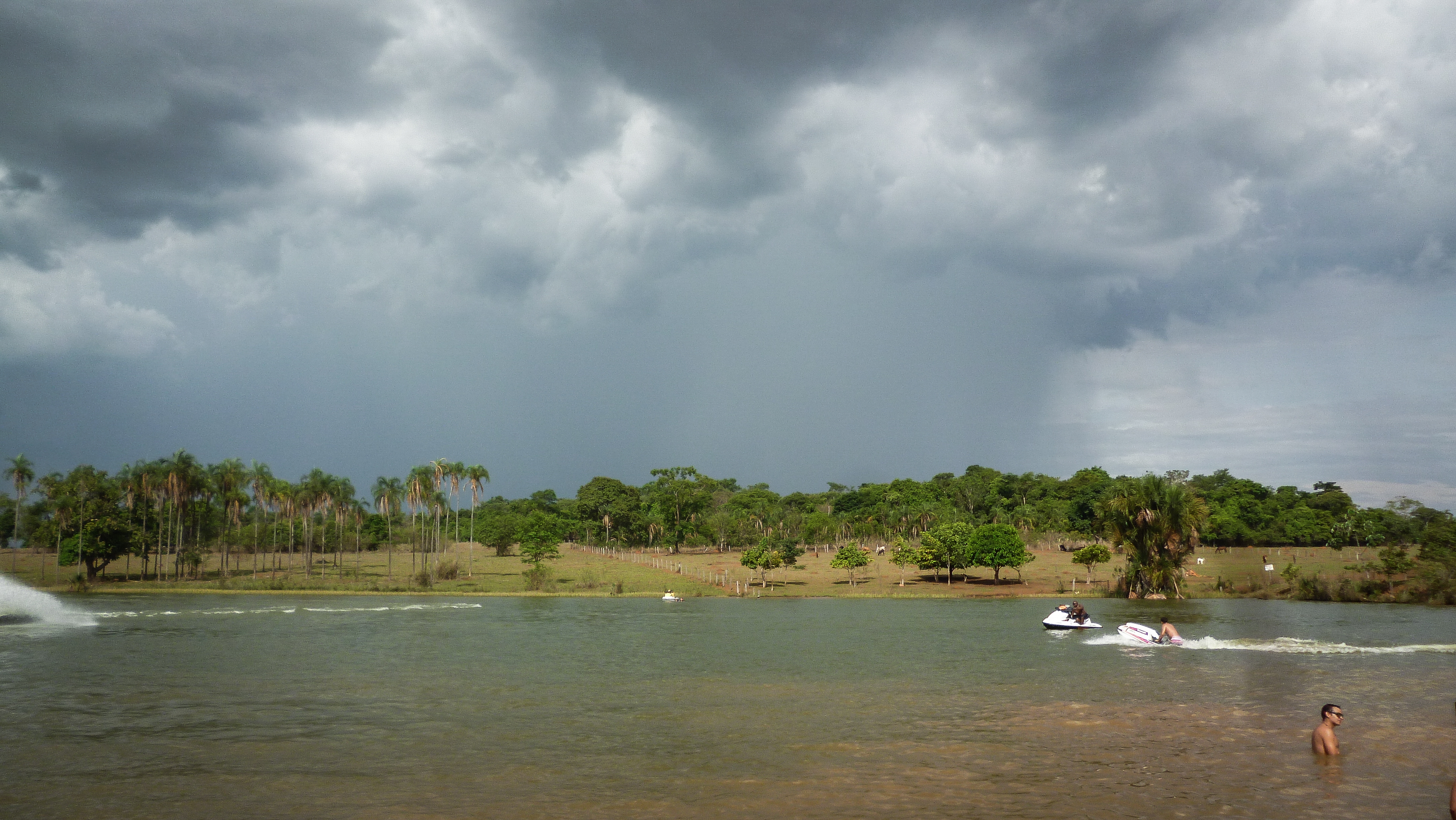

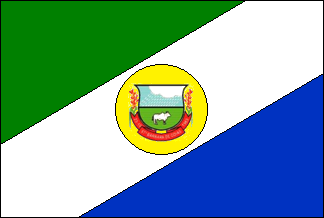
- Flag

- Location in Goiás state

- Location in Brazil
- Coordinates: 16°34′19″S 49°41′45″W
- Country: Brazil
- Region: Central-West
- State: Goiás
- Microregion: Anicuns Microregion

Area
  - Total: 139.5 km^{2} (53.9 sq mi)
- Elevation: 639 m (2,096 ft)

Population (2020)
  - Total: 6,634
  - Density: 47.56/km^{2} (123.2/sq mi)
- Time zone: UTC−3 (BRT)
- Postal code: 75390-000

Santa Bárbara de Goiás is a municipality in eastern Goiás state, Brazil.

== Location ==
Santa Bárbara is located due west of Goiânia. Nearby towns are Trindade (40 km. to the east), and Nazário (17 km. to the west). The regional center, Anicuns) is 25 km. to the northwest. Highway connections are made from Goiânia by state highway BR-069 west from Goiânia, through Trindade, and then 40 kilometers west to Santa Bárbara de Goiás. Neighboring municipalities are Avelinópolis, Nazário, Campestre de Goiás, and Guapó.

Demographics

- In 2007 the population density was 40.53 inhabitants/km^{2}. In 2007 there were 5,003 people living in the urban area and 655 people living in the rural area.

== The economy ==
The economy is based on services, public employment, cattle raising, and agriculture. There was one financial institution, a branch of Itaú Bank. In 2006 there were 16,600 head of cattle. The main agricultural products were rice, bananas, beans, manioc, corn, soybeans, and tomatoes.

== Health and education ==
There was 1 hospital with 13 beds in 2007. In 2000 the infant mortality rate was 23,42—below the national average of 33.0. In 2006 the school system had 4 schools and 1,609 students. In 2000 the adult literacy rate was 85.5%--below the national average of 86.4%. The ranking on the Municipal Human Development Index was 0.733

- State ranking on MHDI: 134 (out of 242 municipalities)
- National ranking on MHDI: 2.357 (out of 5,507 municipalities)

== History ==
The settlement of Santa Bárbara began in 1930 with the arrival in the area of its first settlers, Pedro Luís Tavares, Antônio José de Araújo, and Tomás Lobo. Two years later the construction began of a chapel honoring Saint Barbara, known as defender against storms and lightning, which were very common in the area. At first it was a district of the municipality of Trindade and got city status in 1963. Source: Sepin

== See also ==
- List of municipalities in Goiás
- Microregions of Goiás
