= Mossâmedes =

- Municipality
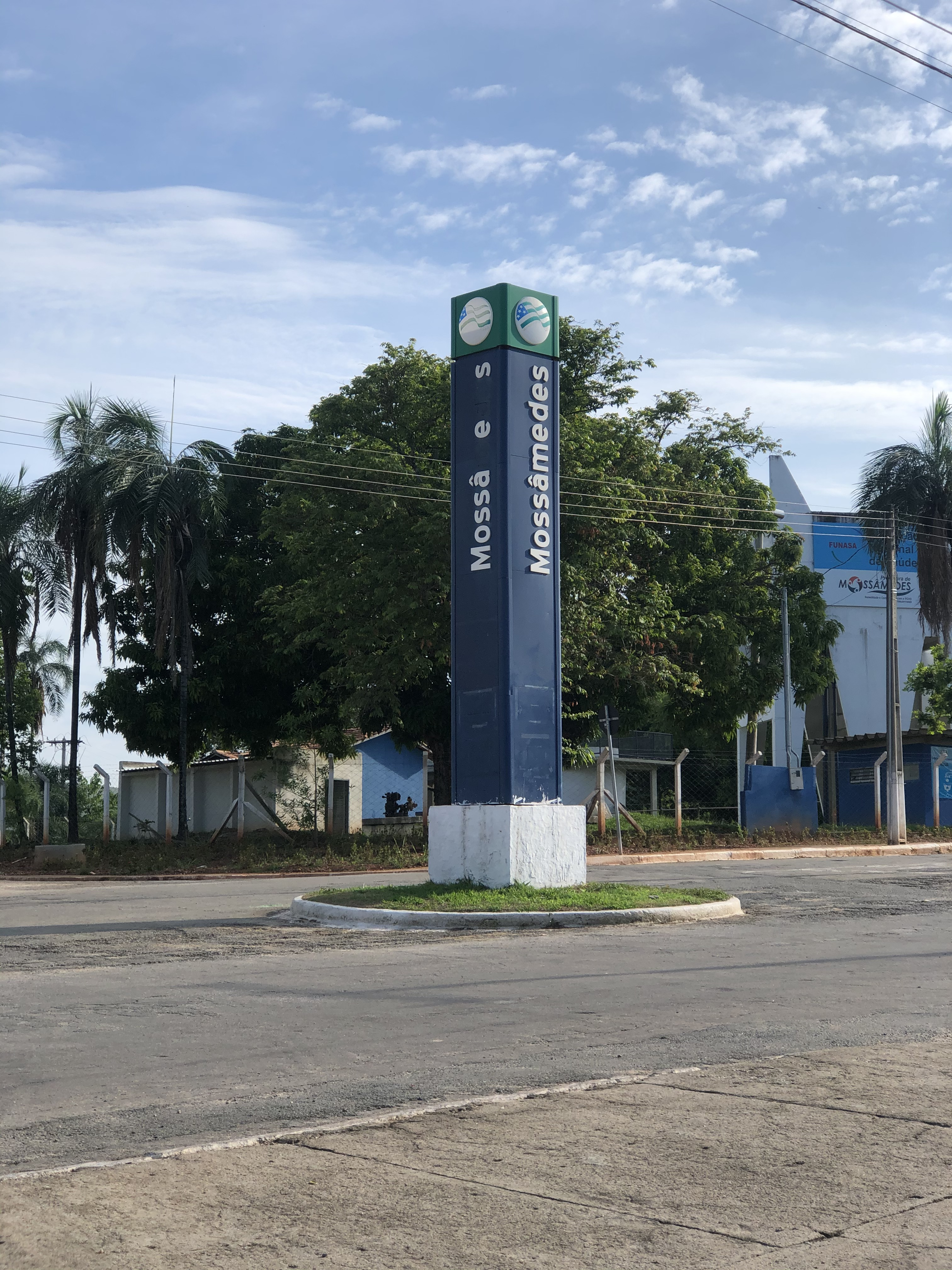

- Flag

- Location in Goiás state

- Location in Brazil
- Coordinates: 16°07′15″S 50°12′32″W
- Country: Brazil
- Region: Central-West
- State: Goiás
- Microregion: Anicuns Microregion

Area
  - Total: 684.4 km^{2} (264.2 sq mi)
- Elevation: 615 m (2,018 ft)

Population (2020)
  - Total: 4,206
  - Density: 6.146/km^{2} (15.92/sq mi)
- Time zone: UTC−3 (BRT)
- Postal code: 76150-000

Mossâmedes is a municipality in western Goiás state, Brazil.

== Location ==
Mossâmedes is located northwest of the state capital, Goiânia in the Anicuns Microregion. It is connected by paved roads with Itaberaí to the north and Anicuns to the south. The distance to the state capital is 142 kilometers. Road connections from Goiânia are made by GO-060 / Trindade / GO-326 / Anicuns / GO-222 / Chopana / GO-326 / Sanclerlândia / GO-164.

Municipal boundaries are with Goiás, Sanclerlândia, Adelândia, Americano do Brasil, Anicuns, Itaberaí and Buriti de Goiás

The municipality contains the 144-hectare (360-acre) Professor José Ângelo Rizzo Biological Reserve, a strictly protected conservation unit created in 1969 and administered by the Federal University of Goiás (UFG). It also contains part of the 26,626-hectare (65,790-acre) Serra Dourada State Park, created in 2003.

== Demographics ==
The population has decreased by more than 50% since 1980, when it was 12,208. At that time most of the population was rural and did not transfer to the urban area but to other urban centers in the state. From 1991 to 2000 the geometric population growth rate was -4.83.%. In 2007 3,472 inhabitants lived in the urban area and 1,482 lived in the rural area.

== The economy ==
The main economic activities are cattle and poultry raising, small-scale farming, services, and government employment. In 2007, there were 3 industrial units and 44 retail units. There was one banking institution represented: Banco Itaú S.A. There were 83,400 head of cattle. The main agricultural products in planted area were rice, bananas, sugarcane, manioc, corn, and hearts of palm. None exceeded 1,000 hectares of planted area.

== Health and education ==
In the health sector there was 1 hospital with 20 beds and 4 walk-in health clinics. The infant mortality rate was 20.33 in every 1,000 live births, which was below the national rate of 35.0 in the same year.

The school system had 6 schools and 1,170 students. There was 1 middle school and no institutions of higher learning. The adult literacy rate was 84.6%, below the national average of 86.4% in 2000. The ranking on the Municipal Human Development Index was 0.751, which placed Mossâmedes 74 out of 242 municipalities in the state of Goiás and 1,862 out of 5,507 municipalities in the country. For the complete list see frigoletto.com.br

== History ==
The settlement of Mossâmedes began as a village for the Indian tribes of Naundós, Acroás, and Caiapós in 1755. Its first name was São José de Mossâmedes in honor of the Captain-General Dom José de Almeida Soveral de Carvalho, Governor of the Capitania of Goiás, who was from the village of Mossâmedes in Portugal. From 1770 to 1774 the village went through a complete restructure due to its near disappearance due to the Indians' inability to adapt to life there. Damiana da Cunha, granddaughter of the chief of the Caiapós was instrumental in converting the Indians. In 1780 the village was designated a freguesia with the name of São José de Mossâmedes. In 1781, due to the continuing evasion of the Indians, another group of 800 Javaés and Carajás was brought from the Ilha do Bananal. In 1845 Mossâmedes became a district, belonging to Itaberaí. In 1890 it was a district of Goiás, the territorial capital. Finally in 1938 it was raised to municipal status as Mossâmedes. Source: Sepin

== See also ==
- List of municipalities in Goiás
- Microregions of Goiás
