= Damiana da Cunha =

Indigenous leader

- Born: c. 1779; Captaincy of Goiás, Colonial Brazil
- Died: 1831; São José de Mossâmedes, Province of Goiás, Empire of Brazil
- Spouse(s): José Luiz da Costa (died 1809); Manuel Pereira da Cruz (m. 1822)

Damiana da Cunha (1779–1831) was a cacique of the Kayapo people in what is now Brazil. She was also a colonial-era captain major and sertanista who was an important political figure in Colonial Brazil in the late 18th and early 19th centuries. Her position as a cultural mediator between the Indigenous peoples and the Portuguese is highlighted in the historiography of Indigenous women for its historical importance, comparable to those of Bartira, Catarina Paraguaçu and Clara Camarão.

== Biography ==
Damiana was the granddaughter of cacique Angraí-oxá, and was sponsored by colonial governor Luís da Cunha Menezes, from whom she received her Christian name and her Portuguese last name. There is no available information about her Indigenous name. She spent part of her infancy in the house of Cunha Menezes, often being raised between her Indigenous roots and the culture of the Portuguese colonizers. Her role has been revised with regards to the historiography.

=== Marriage ===
Damiana was married two times. The first, at around 14 years old, to sergeant José Luiz da Costa, to whom she became widowed in 1809, when she was close to 30 years old. The second marriage occurred in 1822, when she married soldier Manuel Pereira da Cruz who, from what is known, was of racially mixed background and that he had little wealth.

=== Death ===
At the beginning of 1831, Damiana returned from her last travel to the sertão and was received in the village (or aldeia) by the president of the province and various local authorities. Despite the joy at the arrival of the Kayapo leader, she returned sick due to the conditions of the sertão. From what is known, she died at some point between 2 February and 9 March 1831. Her body was interred at a local church.

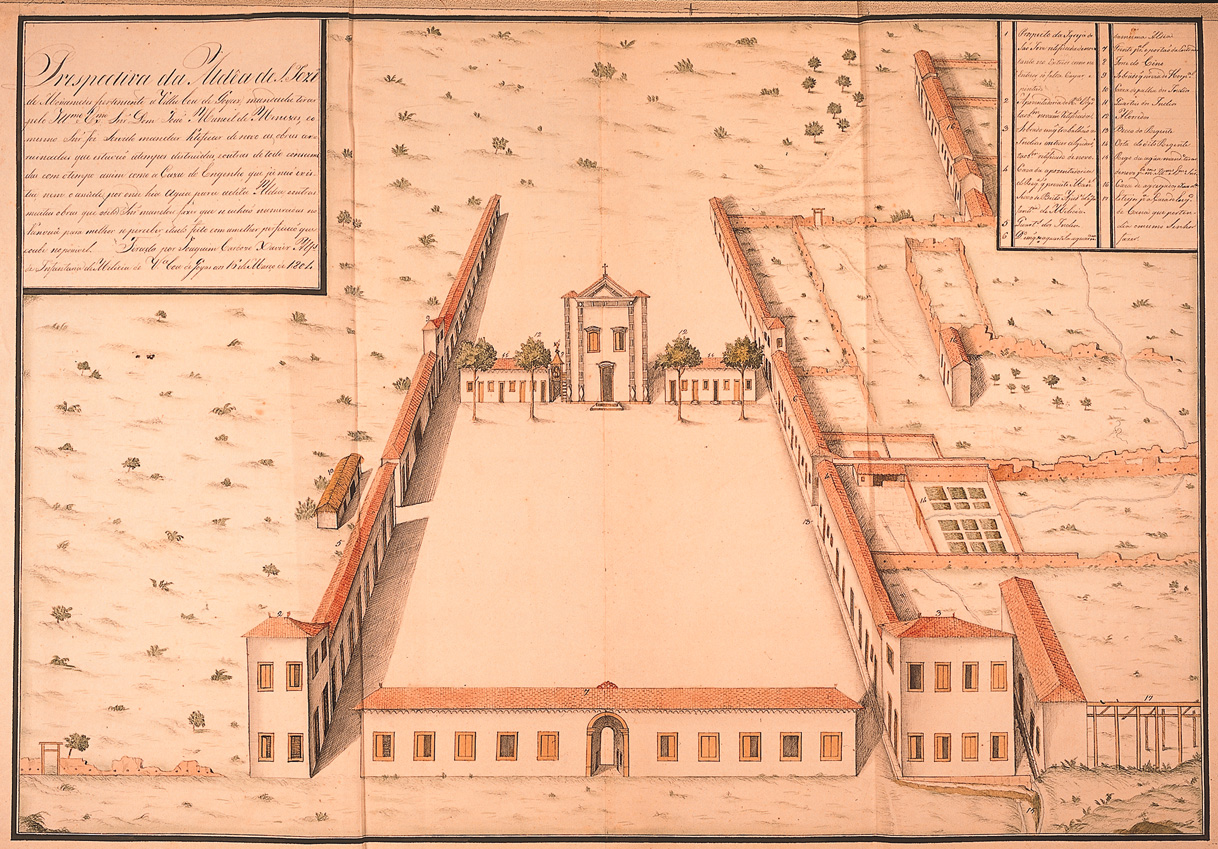
"Perspective of the Village of São José de Mossâmedes belonging to Villa Boa de Goyas sent to be taken by Ilmo. Exmo. Snr. Dom João Manoel de Menezes... Taken by Joaquim Cardozo Xavier Afs. from the infantry of the Va. boa de Goyas militia on 16 March 1801."

== Historical context ==
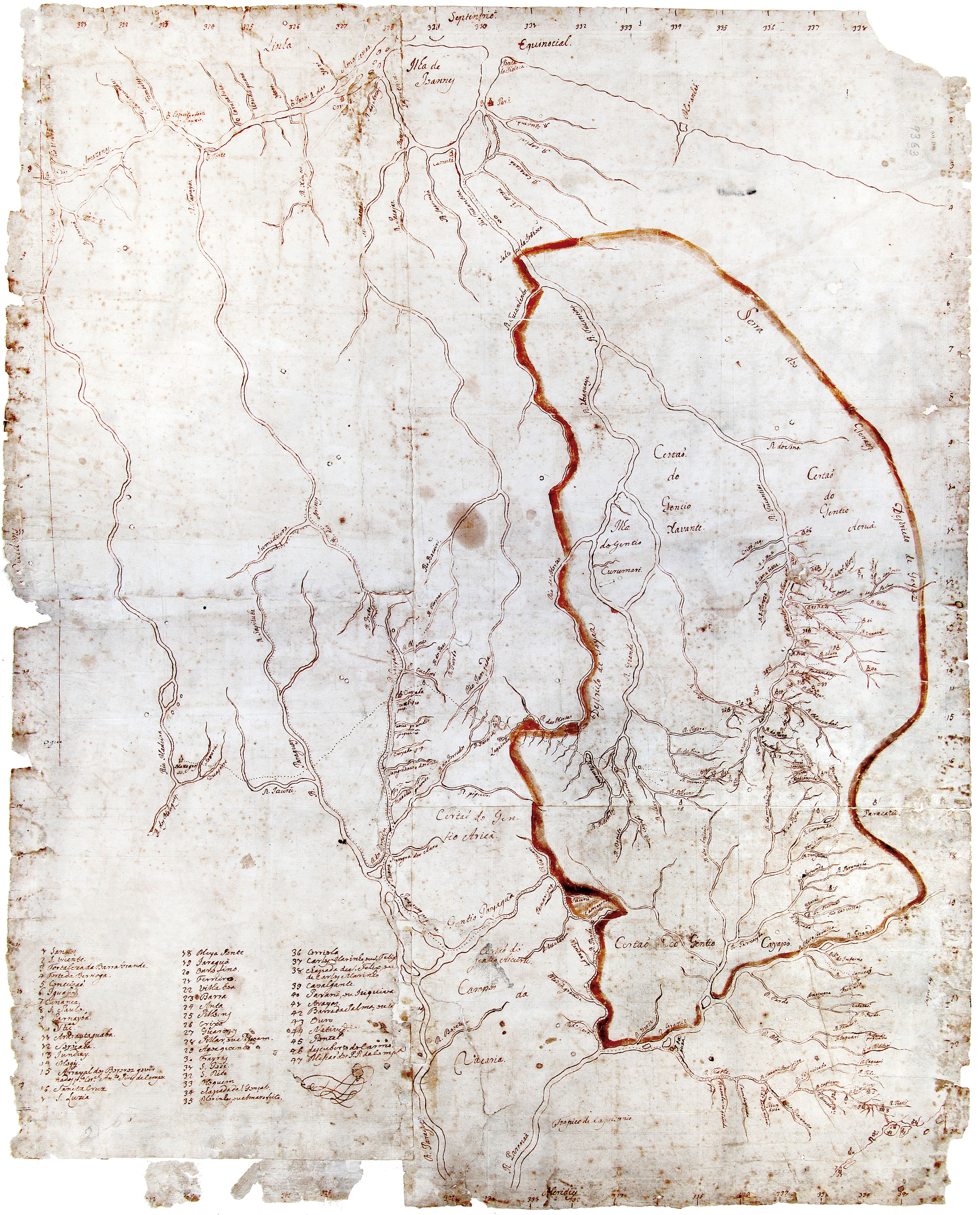
The map assigning the limits of Goiás. This configuration of the captaincy was the proposal of Dom Marcos de Noronha, Count of Arcos, the first governor and captain-general of the Captaincy of Goiás (1749–1754). It was presented in a letter sent on 12 January 1750 to the Portuguese government. In the territory outlined in red, there is an inscription about the Terras do Gentio Cayapó.

At the 17th century, the bandeirantes began to carry out expeditions into what is now central Brazil in search of precious metals. They encountered gold in the Captaincy of Goiás in the 1720s. As a result, the region began needing proper structures to use the discoveries to its best benefit and eventually became independent of the Captaincy of São Paulo in 1749. Meanwhile, the exploitation of minerals created conflicts between the colonizers and the Indigenous peoples that had lived in the region prior. Among them were the Kayapo. The clashes, along with the violent and racist attitudes that the miners had against the Indigenous peoples, led to various ramifications. Among others, due to not being a renewable resource, there increasingly became a scarcity of gold and other minerals. This brought about an era known as the "mining crisis" that would provoke future problems in colonial Brazil.

In the middle of the 18th century, the Portuguese Empire began to encounter economic difficulties and issues with the line of royal succession during the final years of Dom John V (1706–1750), which were marked by a "disintegration of central power, by a break in revenue coming from Brazil, and by the decline in health of the king." Dom Joseph I (1750– 777) ascended to the throne in Portugal, putting at the helm his minister Sebastião José de Carvalho e Melo, the future Marquis of Pombal, who carried out a series of reforms with the objective of stopping the crisis. The goals promulgated by the minister were aimed, above all, to strengthen the Portuguese state, the administrative reorganization of the empire and stronger control in colonial areas.

The Indigenous peoples were central in these reforms, as the Portuguese authorities were worried about guarding the borders of the Portuguese colony and strengthening the colonial dominion. Among the measures made by the Marquis de Pombal were the "good treatment" to be given to the Natives, envisioning them being turned into "civilized" and "useful" subjects, capable of proving and becoming "lucrative/productive" in the territory colonized by the Portuguese. In Goiás, the Pombal-led legislation later gained force when the appeal of Indigenous labor could potentially assist in the prosperity of the captaincy, having in mind the decadence of the mining industry.

The Kayapos were the main Indigenous group affected by the Marquis de Pombal's policies in Goiás, with the establishment of two Indigenous missionaries (known as aldeamentos) created specifically for them: Maria I and São José de Mossâmedes. The latter would later become the modern-day city of Mossâmedes. The aldeamentos were central in the colonial administration's policies towards the Native peoples since the middle of the 16th century. They were the principal form of forced assimilation of the Indigenous peoples into colonial society and functioned as a way of guaranteeing the formation of colonial borders through the occupation of these spaces by Indigenous peoples under the control of the Portuguese colony. Having been forced into accepting the demands made by the Portuguese, the Indigenous peoples were immensely dissatisfied with the living situation they were put into, resulting in a high number of people fleeing the aldeamentos. Due to this, daily life in the aldeias came to depend on the constant arrival of new groups of Indigenous people going into unoccupied spaces made by the colonial administrators, then called the sertão.

== Political circumstances ==
Damiana da Cunha had been integrated into colonial society and had an important role in the regional political scene of the time. As she was sponsored by the captaincy's governor, she had intense contact with Catholic, Portuguese culture. She represented, even as a child, an intersection between two different and often antagonistic worlds: one of the Kayapo (where she came from and based her worldview on), and that of the Portuguese colonizers. The knowledge of both cultures, as well as her familial links with both an important cacique and the governor of the captaincy, made her qualified to act as a political mediator.

Damiana was known for her command in expeditions that had captured fugitive Indigenous people from the aldeamentos or had contacted those that had not already been integrated into colonial society. Her political abilities created the possibility of links between the Native peoples in the sertão and, because of this, Damiana was able to convince some of the Kayapos to go to the aldeamentos. Along with having the respect of her people, she was also recognized by colonial authorities.

After her fourth and last expedition into the sertão, which lasted 8 months, Damiana returned to Mossâmedes in 1831, accompanied by 32 Indigenous people. She was received by the people of the aldeamento, by the provincial president and by other authorities that were hosting a party. However, due to the conditions she faced during the expedition, she returned very sick and died, most likely between 2 February and 9 March 1831, being interred at the local church.

== Legacy ==
=== Literature ===
Damiana da Cunha was represented in Brazilian literature by various means over time. Biographies produced in the 19th century had searched to portray her as a "model Indian". This utilization was the consequence of the political agenda at the time, the objective of which was to create a unified national identity. To that end, the intellectuals involved in this project chose people with notable accomplishments and created narratives for them to be transformed into national heroes. Damiana da Cunha had also been subject to these revisions through the lens of Indianist literature, as she embodied attributes that were assigned to Native peoples at the time, such as noble attitudes and their conversion to Catholicism. Meanwhile, the religious issue was a prominent talking point in the literary works of the 19th century, being used as a justification for the creation of missions and expeditions.

Already by the 20th century, those who recorded her history created a narrative during this time that sought to regionalize Damiana. Soon, along with religious issues, her credibility among both the colonizers and the Kayapos was fundamental for the project. This occurred due to the government's intention at the time to amend for the impacts of Portuguese colonization and foment a sense of belonging among the people of Goiás. Works made during the 21st century, such as with Maria José Silveira and "Guerra no Coração do Cerrado", seek to counteract the narrative constructed in previous centuries about the Kayapo people. In the book, Silveira intended to explore Damiana's feelings during various situations in her live, instead of explaining her accomplishments in an irreverent and grandiose manner.

For a long time, Damiana as an idea was appropriated for political ends, without the idea of understanding her as a complex individual. Above all, as a consequence of the current political atmosphere, her memory has been disputed to counteract the current historical narrative, still heavily based on a Eurocentric worldview.

=== Museums ===
The Museu das Bandeiras (MUBAN), affiliated with the Brazilian Institute of Museums (IBRAM), has a collection where they have highlighted objects significant to the history of the presence of Black, Indigenous, and Portuguese people in Goiás. Out of a total of 590 items, 12 items in the collection are related to Damiana.

The "Imaginar os Sertões de Damiana da Cunha" exposition was open to visits in the courtyard of the museum from October to December 2021. One of the objectives of the proposal was to create an exposition circuit that recounts the history of Damiana, for the first time, through the eyes of Indigenous women, quilombolas, traditional healers, and masters of oral traditions. Of the works present at the exposition, 7 items had been incorporated into the visual arts collection of the Museu das Bandeiras through donations by artists. These items fit into an ethnographic theme and were compiled as a result of educational actions made by museums, returning to the community of the city of Goiás and its surroundings. In addition, one highlighted item within the mobile collection is a 17th-century version of a rosewood chair, attributed to Damiana da Cunha. Little is known about the providence of the item, with it only known to have been sold at auction in 1953.

=== São José de Mossâmedes ===
The conflicts in between Indigenous groups and the low quality of life in the aldeamentos led to constant escapes by the Indigenous inhabitants. Soon, the expeditions into the sertão of Goiás led by Damiana da Cunha, which had the objective of recapturing the Indigenous people, above all the Kayapos of the aldeamento of São José de Mossâmedes, progressively declined. The first and second expeditions, in 1809 and 1819 respectively, led to the capture of 70 Indigenous people, while the third, fourth, and fifth expeditions, in 1821, 1827, and 1830 respectively, demonstrated the lessening amounts of forced assimilation among the Native peoples. This became most evident due to the fact that, after Damiana's death in 1831, and her being recognized as a leader by various colonial administrators, the majority of Kayapo fled. The aldeamento was disestablished in 1879.

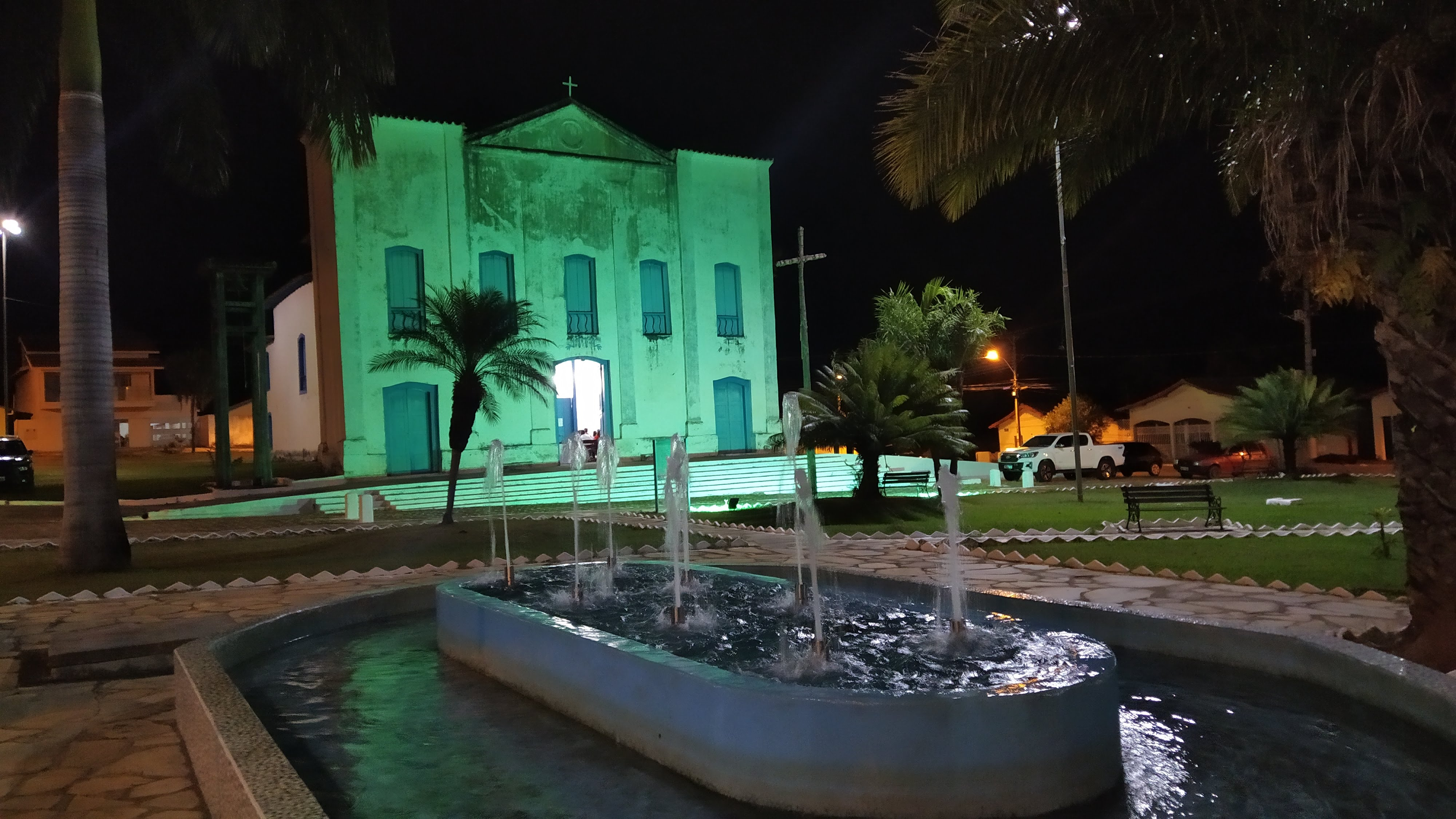
Igreja de São José, constructed at the time of the establishment of the aldeamento.

Despite the end of the Indigenous village (or aldeia) itself, in the middle of the 19th century, there was the creation by provincial law of the district of São José de Mossâmedes. In 1911, it became a new administrative division, turning the region into a district of the municipality of Goiás. By 1953, Mossâmedes was elevated to a municipality itself. In this territory, during the time that it was an aldeamento, the mother church of São José was built. This became the element that allowed the building of connections during the expeditions to be made, echoing the history of the city and its cultural value. It officially became a part of the historical heritage of the state of Goiás, enacted by State Law nº 9.843/85. The church is located in a plaza that bears Damiana da Cunha's name.

== Historiographical revisions ==
Historiographical debates have pointed towards the idea that the representation of Damiana as a "sertanista" who was "civilized", a figure who favored the creation of aldeamentos in colonial Brazil, reinforces colonial attitudes and practices. The representation of Indigenous women became a primary focus in the 21st century, due to in part the demands of the Brazilian Indigenous woman's movement and the strengthening of the movement to revise previous conceptions about Brazilian Indigenous history.
