= Americano do Brasil =

- Municipality
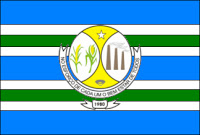
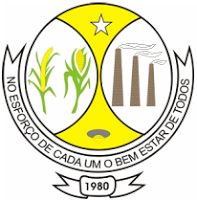
- Flag Coat of arms

- Location in Goiás state

- Location in Brazil
- Coordinates: 16°15′20″S 49°58′57″W
- Country: Brazil
- Region: Central-West
- State: Goiás
- Microregion: Anicuns Microregion

Area
  - Total: 134.0 km^{2} (51.7 sq mi)
- Elevation: 890 m (2,920 ft)

Population (2020)
  - Total: 6,164
  - Density: 46.00/km^{2} (119.1/sq mi)
- Time zone: UTC−3 (BRT)
- Postal code: 76165-000

Americano do Brasil is a municipality in eastern Goiás state, Brazil.

== Location ==
Americano do Brasil is located in the Anicuns Microregion, which is northwest of the state capital, Goiânia. It is 37 kilometers southwest of Itaberaí and 113 kilometers northwest of Goiânia. Highway connections from Goiânia are made by GO-060 / Trindade / GO-326 / Anicuns / GO-156. Sepin. Neighboring municipalities are Mossâmedes, Anicuns, Itaberaí and Itauçu.

== Demographics ==
- Population density: 35.17 inhabitants/km^{2} (2007)
- Population growth rate: -1.06%
- Population in 1991: 4,861
- Population in 2007: 4,698
- Urban population: 4,371
- Rural population: 327

== The economy ==
The main economic activities are cattle raising (19,054 head in 2003) and agriculture, especially corn, sugarcane, rice, and bananas.

- Industrial establishments: 9
- Commercial retail establishments: 63
- Dairies: Amarildo José Missiato. (22/05/2006)
- Meat packing plant: Vitacharque Indústria e Comércio de Alimentos Ltda. (22/05/2006)
- Motor vehicles in 2007: 515 automobiles and pickup trucks, giving a ratio of 9 inhabitants for each motor vehicle.

Area of Main crops in 2006

- Corn: 950 ha.
- Sugarcane: 1,990 ha.
- Rice: 350 ha.
- Bananas: 100 ha.
- Soybeans: 250 ha.

Farm data

- Number of farms: 197
- Total agricultural area: 9,472 ha.
- Planted area: 2,604 ha.
- Area of natural pasture: 5,657 ha.
- Persons employed in agriculture: 500

== Health and education ==
The infant mortality rate in 2000 was 24.88. There were 2 small hospitals with 24 beds. The literacy rate in 2000 was 83.2. In 2004 there were 3 primary schools and 1 secondary school. Source: IBGE 2004

Americano do Brasil had a score 0.732 on the Municipal Human Development Index, giving it a state ranking of 138 (out of 242 municipalities) and a national ranking of 2,384 (out of 5,507 municipalities). All data are from 2000

== See also ==
- List of municipalities in Goiás
- Microregions of Goiás
