= Microregion of Anicuns =

Coordinates: 16°27′39″S 49°57′43″W

Anicuns
- Microregion
- Location in Goias state
- Country: Brazil
- State: Goiás
- Mesoregion: Centro Goiano
- Municipalities: 13

Area
  - Total: 5,483.0 km^{2} (2,117.0 sq mi)

Population (2007)
  - Total: 100,759
  - Density: 18.377/km^{2} (47.595/sq mi)

The Anicuns Microregion is a geographical division in the state of Goiás, Brazil. It is made up of 13 municipalities located around Anicuns, a municipality west of Goiânia.

== Municipalities ==
The microregion consists of the following municipalities:

Name	Population (2007)
Adelândia	2,510
Americano do Brasil	4,698
Anicuns	17,705
Aurilândia	3,719
Avelinópolis	2,375
Buriti de Goiás	2,238
Firminópolis	10,286
Mossâmedes	4.954
Nazário	7,223
Sanclerlândia	7,647
Santa Bárbara de Goiás	5,658
São Luís de Montes Belos	26,784
Turvânia	4,962

== See also ==
- Microregions of Goiás
- List of municipalities in Goiás
