= Serra Dourada State Park =

State park in Goiás, Brazil

- Parque Estadual da Serra Dourada
- IUCN category II (national park)
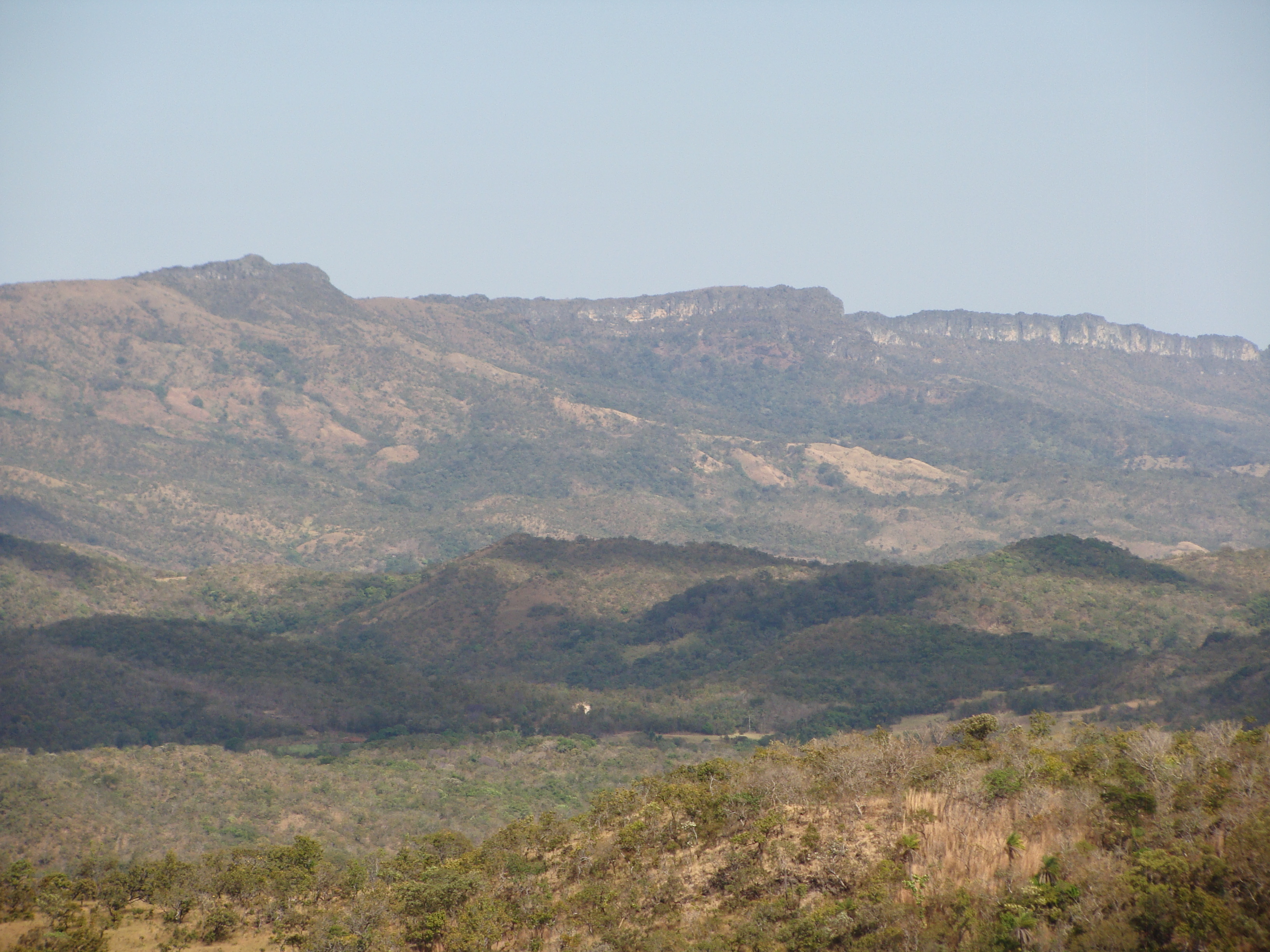
- Cliffs of the Serra Dourada

- Location within Brazil
- Coordinates: 16°05′27″S 50°16′43″W
- Area: 28,625 ha (110.52 sq mi)
- Designation: State park
- Created: 2003
- Administrator: Secretaria Estadual de Meio Ambiente e dos Recursos Hídricos

The Serra Dourada State Park (Portuguese: Parque Estadual da Serra Dourada) is a state park in the state of Goiás, Brazil.

== Location ==
The Serra Dourada State Park is in the northwest of Goiás, divided between the municipalities of Buriti de Goiás, Mossâmedes and the city of Goiás. As of 2014 it had an area of 28,625 hectares (70,730 acres). The park is about 40 kilometres (25 mi) from the city of Mossâmedes. It is on top of a mountain range, and can be reached with a four-wheel drive car. Within the park the trails are level and lead to interesting rock formations called "stone cities" surrounded by typical cerrado vegetation.

== History ==
The Serra Dourada State Park was established in 2003. It included 188 properties. A 2008 thesis on sustainable ecotourism in the park found that nothing had been done following the decree creating the park. Although there was large potential, there was no management plan and no environmental education for visitors.

In June 2014 it was reported that the State Secretariat for the Environment and Water Resources (Semarh) was studying a proposal by the Union of Rural Producers of the city of Goiás to reduce the size of the park from 28,625 to 16,500 hectares (70,730 to 40,770 acres). According to a consultant for the Federation of Agriculture and Livestock of Goiás, "the park exists only on paper, was created without the studies required by the legislation, and to this day no one knows where it begins and where it ends. The vice-president of the Goiás branch of the Association of Brazilian Geographers (AGB-GO) said the proposal made no sense when efforts were being made to preserve what was left of the cerrado and even to recover degraded areas.

== Sources ==
- Barbosa, Marciana Alves (2008), O ecoturismo e a sustentabilidade - Parque Estadual da Serra Dourada - GO (PESD) (Thesis) (in Portuguese), PUC GOIÁS
- Burigato, Thiago (7 June 2014), "Parque Serra Dourada pode ser reduzido em 42%", Jornal Opção (in Portuguese)
- "Parque Estadual da Serra Dourada", Férias Brasil (in Portuguese)
