= Professor José Ângelo Rizzo Biological Reserve =

- IUCN category Ia (strict nature reserve)
- Location within Brazil
- Coordinates: 16°06′07″S 50°12′36″W
- Designation: Biological reserve
- Administrator: ICMBio

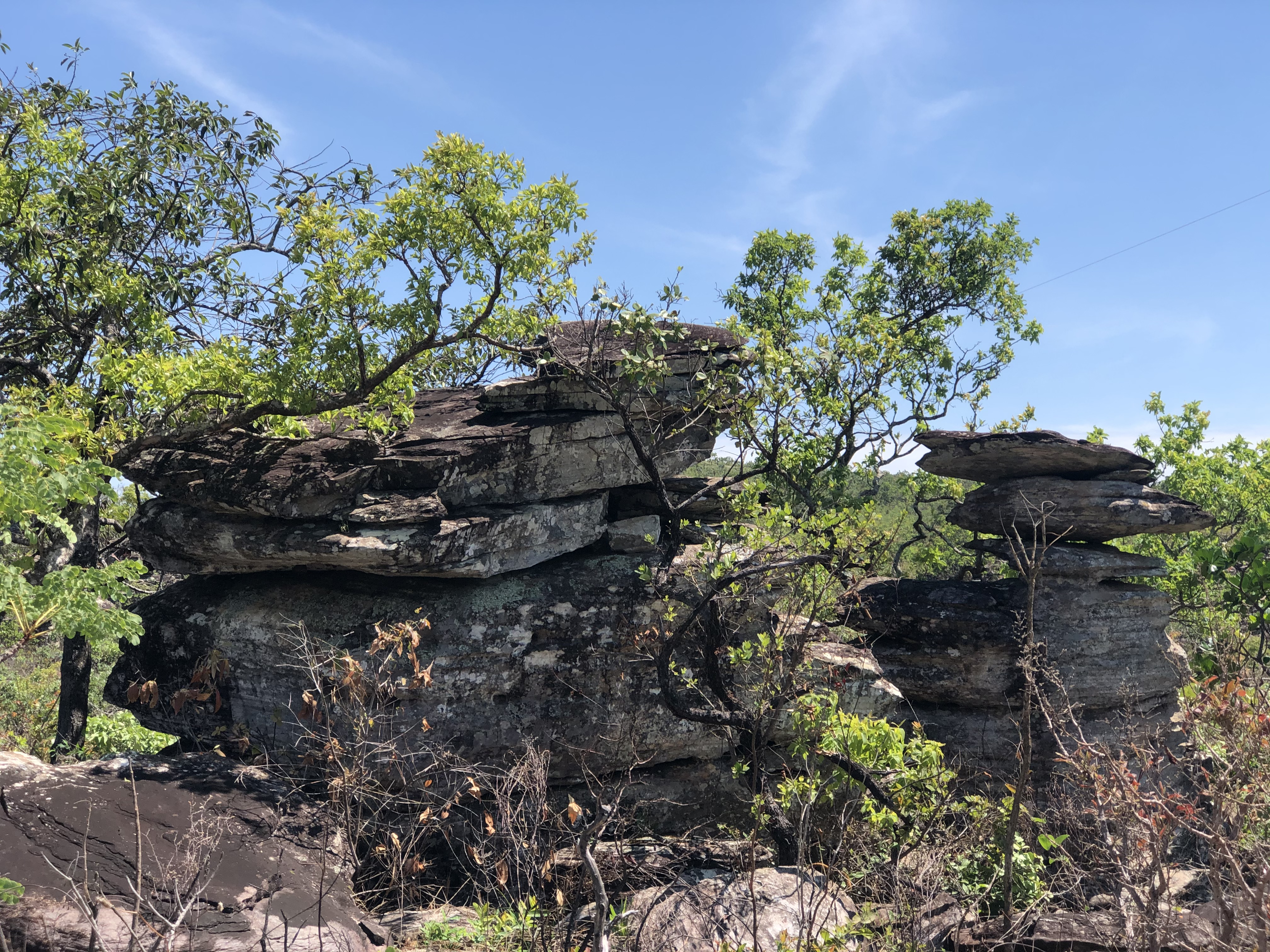

Professor José Ângelo Rizzo Biological Reserve (Portuguese: Reserva Biológica Professor José Ângelo Rizzo) is a biological reserve in the state of Goiás, Brazil.

== Location ==
The reserve was created in 1969 in the municipality of Mossâmedes, about 146 kilometres (91 mi) from Goiânia. It is located in the Serra Dourada. The reserve, which covers 144 hectares (360 acres), is the responsibility of the Federal University of Goiás (UFG), and is also known as the Reserva Biológica da UFG. It is within the Serra Dourada State Park. The reserve is surrounded by a fence, and accessible by dirt road. It contains laboratories and housing which provide a base for researchers, students and visitors.

== Environment ==
The reserve is of interest for its vegetation, geological formation, wildlife and scenic beauty. The area includes slopes of the Sierra, and is well preserved. It displays cerrado characteristics, including the presence of endemic species. Some areas are devoid of high plants and covered mostly by grass of the Vellozia and Tibouchina papyrus species. The fauna is composed mainly of insects, birds, amphibians, reptiles and small mammals.

== Sources ==
- Goias, Fatbirder
- Palmeira Trindade, Luma Mota; Sousa Fernandes, Yanne; Almeida Gonçalves, Letícia de (3 September 2013), Diversidade e desenvolvimento dos tricomas glandulares de Lomatozona artemisiifolia Baker (Asteraceae - Eupatorieae) - uma planta endêmica do Cerrado de Goiás (in Portuguese)
- Reserva Biológica prof. José Ângelo Rizzo (in Portuguese), UFG
- "Reserva Biológica da UFG", eco.tur.br (in Portuguese)
