= Aurilândia =

- Municipality
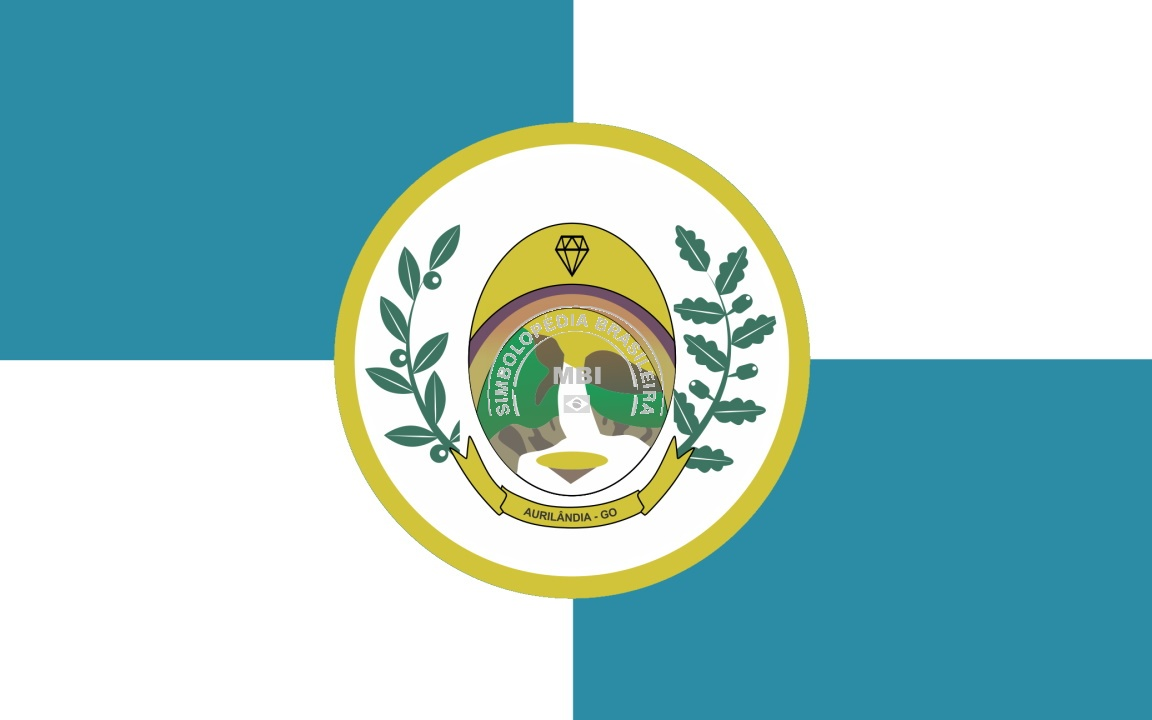
- Flag

- Location in Goiás state

- Location in Brazil
- Coordinates: 15°41′06″S 50°28′54″W
- Country: Brazil
- Region: Central-West
- State: Goiás
- Microregion: Anicuns Microregion

Area
  - Total: 567.0 km^{2} (218.9 sq mi)
- Elevation: 520 m (1,710 ft)

Population (2020)
  - Total: 3,058
  - Density: 5.393/km^{2} (13.97/sq mi)
- Time zone: UTC−3 (BRT)
- Postal code: 76120-000

Aurilândia is a municipality in eastern Goiás state, Brazil.

== Location ==
The distance to the state capital is 146 km. while the distance to the main regional center São Luís de Montes Belos is 23 km. Highway connections from Goiânia are made by state highway BR-069 west from Goiânia, through Trindade, São Luís de Montes Belos, and then 23 kilometers south to Aurilândia.

Neighboring municipalities are São Luís de Montes Belos, Firminópolis, São João da Paraúna, and Paraúna.

== Demographics ==
- Population density: 6,58 inhabitants/km^{2} (2007)
- Population growth rate: -1.93% 1996/2007
- Population in 1980: 4,953
- Population in 2007: 3,719
- Urban population: 2,762

== Economy ==
The main economic activities are cattle raising, agriculture, commerce, and small transformation industries. Public administration is the largest employer. There is a large informal economy. There were 61,200 head of cattle (6,000 milking cows) in 2006. The main agricultural products were bananas, hearts of palm, rice, manioc, and corn. There were 400 automobiles and pickup trucks in 2007, giving a ratio of 9 inhabitants for each motor vehicle.

- Number of farms: 341
- Total agricultural area: 50,397 ha.
- Planted area: 610 ha.
- Area of natural pasture: 39,767e
- Persons employed in agriculture: 986 (IBGE 2006)

== Health and education ==
The infant mortality rate in 2000 was 24.88. There was 1 small hospital (2007) with 19 beds. The literacy rate in 2000 was 84.3%. There were 3 schools with 826 students in 2006. The score on the Municipal Human Development Index was 0.732, giving it a state ranking of 140 (out of 242 municipalities) and a national ranking of 2,390 (out of 5,507 municipalities). For the complete list see frigoletto.com.br
