= Federal University of Goiás =

Public university in Goiânia, Goiás, Brazil

Coordinates: 16.6062°S 49.2614°W

- Universidade Federal de Goiás
- Other names: UFG
- Type: Public University
- Established: December 14, 1960
- Endowment: R$ 1,364,727,449.00 (2015)
- Rector: Dr. Angelita Pereira de Lima
- Academic staff: 2,038 (2010)
- Administrative staff: 2,336 (2010)
- Undergraduates: 19,908 (2010)
- Postgraduates: 2,484 (2010)
- Location: Goiânia (Headquarters), Catalão; Jataí and Cidade de Goiás, Goiás, Brazil
- Campus: Urban
- Website: ufg.br

The Federal University of Goiás (Portuguese: Universidade Federal de Goiás, UFG) is a publicly funded university located in the Brazilian state of Goiás, headed in Goiânia and with campuses in the municipalities of Catalão, City of Goiás, and Jataí.

Founded on December 14, 1960, after the merger of previously existing colleges, UFG is the only federally funded institution of higher education in the state, the richest and most populous in the Central-West Region of Brazil. The activities of the university involves 28,899 students in 150 undergraduate courses.

According to the National Institute of Studies and Research on Education, linked to the Ministry of Education, UFG is the second best university in the Central-West Region, behind only University of Brasília.

The university administers the 144 hectares (360 acres) Professor José Ângelo Rizzo Biological Reserve, a strictly protected conservation unit created in 1969 in the municipality of Mossâmedes.

== Undergraduate courses ==
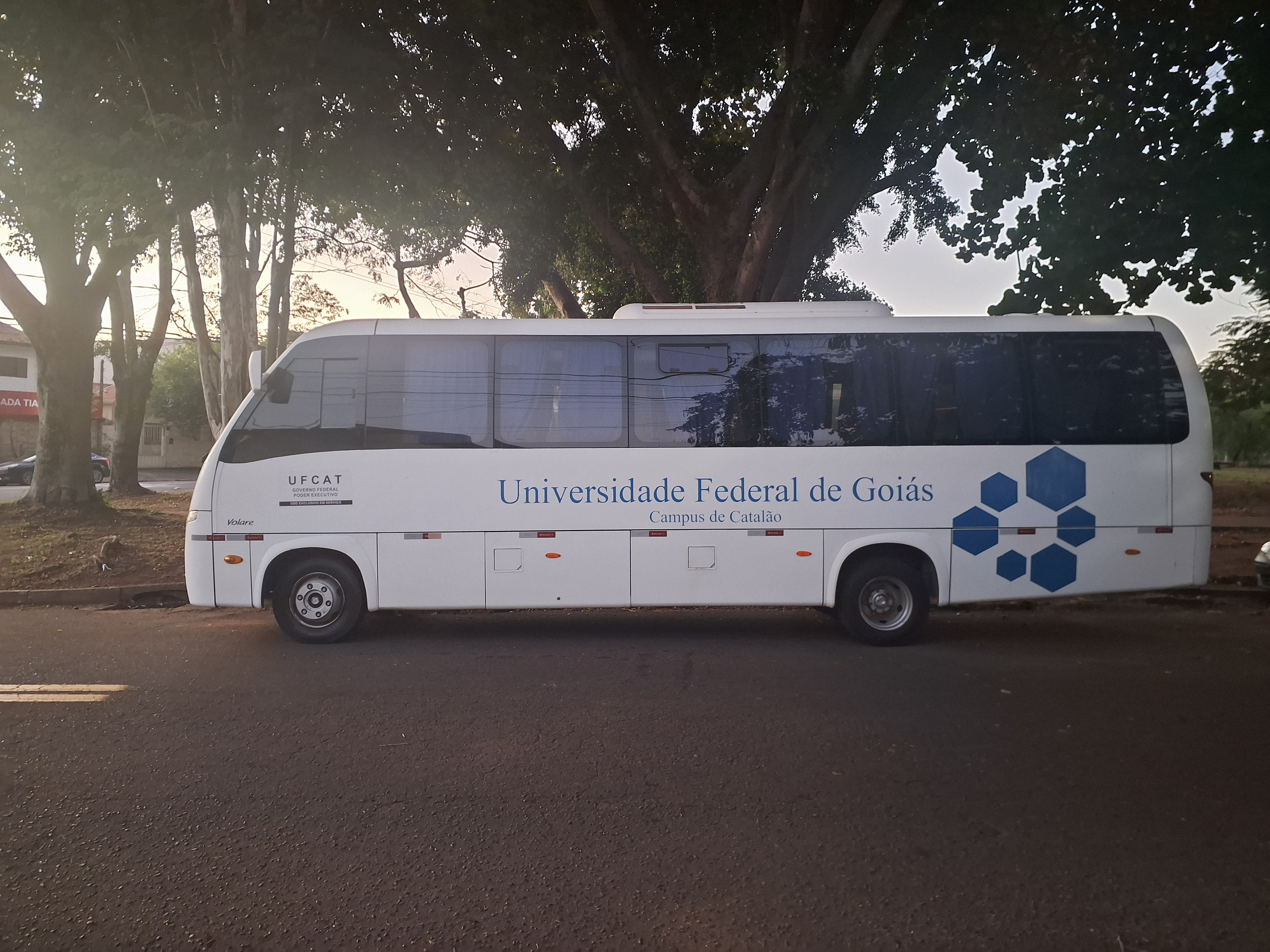
Bus belonging to the Federal University of Goiás parked in Barão Geraldo, Campinas, São Paulo.

Portuguese Name	English name	Campus City
Administração	Administration	Goiânia
Administração	Administration	Catalão
Artes Cênicas	Performing arts	Goiânia
Artes Visuais	Visual arts	Goiânia
Arquitetura e Urbanismo	Architecture, Urbanism	Goiânia
Agronomia	Agronomy	Goiânia
Agronomia	Agronomy	Jataí
Biblioteconomia e Gestão de Unidades de Informação	Library science	Goiânia
Biotecnologia	Biotechnology	Goiânia
Biomedicina	Biomedicine	Goiânia
Ciências Biológicas	Biology	Goiânia
Ciências Biológicas	Biology	Catalão
Ciências Biológicas	Biology	Jataí
Ciências Contábeis	Accountancy	Goiânia
Ciência da Computação	Computer science	Goiânia
Ciência da Computação	Computer science	Catalão
Ciência da Computação	Computer science	Jataí
Ciências Econômicas	Economics	Goiânia
Ciências Sociais	Social sciences	Goiânia
Ciências Sociais	Social sciences	Catalão
Comunicação Social	Social communication	Goiânia
Licenciatura em Dança	Graduate in Dance	Goiânia
Design Gráfico	Graphic design	Goiânia
Design de Moda	Fashion design	Goiânia
Direito	Law	Goiânia
Direito	Law	Goiás
Direito	Law	Jataí
Ecologia e Análise Ambiental	Ecology & Environmental Analysis	Goiânia
Educação Física (Licenciatura)	Physical education (Graduate)	Goiânia
Educação Física (Bacharelado)	Physical education (Bachelor)	Goiânia
Educação Física	Physical education	Catalão
Educação Física	Physical education	Jataí
Educação Musical	Musical education	Goiânia
Enfermagem	Nursing	Goiânia
Enfermagem	Nursing	Jataí
Engenharia Civil	Civil engineering	Goiânia
Engenharia Civil	Civil engineering	Catalão
Engenharia de Alimentos	Food engineering	Goiânia
Engenharia de Computação	Computer engineering, Information engineering	Goiânia
Engenharia de Software	Software engineering	Goiânia
Engenharia de Produção	Industrial engineering	Catalão
Engenharia de Transportes	Transportation engineering	
Engenharia de Minas	Mining engineering	Catalão
Engenharia Mecânica	Mechanical engineering	Goiânia
Engenharia Elétrica	Electrical engineering	Goiânia
Engenharia Física	Physics Engineering	Goiânia
Estatística	Statistics	Goiânia
Farmácia	Pharmacy	Goiânia
Filosofia	Philosophy	Goiânia
Física	Physics	Goiânia
Física Médica	Medical Physics	Goiânia
Fisioterapia	Physical Therapy	Jataí
Geografia	Geography	Goiânia
Gestão da Informação	Information Management	Goiânia
História	History	Goiânia
História	History	Catalão
História	History	Jataí
Inteligência Artificial	Artificial Intelligence	Goiânia
Letras	Linguistics	Goiânia
Letras	Linguistics	Catalão
Letras	Linguistics	Jataí
Matemática	Mathematics	Goiânia
Matemática	Mathematics	Catalão
Matemática Industrial	Industrial Mathematics	Catalão
Matemática	Mathematics	Jataí
Medicina	Medicine	Goiânia
Medicina Veterinária	Veterinary Medicine	Goiânia
Medicina Veterinária	Veterinary Medicine	Jataí
Musicoterapia	Music Therapy	Goiânia
Música	Music	Goiânia
Nutrição	Nutrition	Goiânia
Odontologia	Dentistry	Goiânia
Pedagogia	Pedagogy	Goiânia
Pedagogia	Pedagogy	Catalão
Pedagogia	Pedagogy	Jataí
Psicologia	Psychology	Goiânia
Psicologia	Psychology	Catalão
Psicologia	Psychology	Jataí
Química	Chemistry	Goiânia
Química	Chemistry	Catalão
Química	Chemistry	Jataí
Relações Internacionais	International Relations	Goiânia
Sistemas de Informação	Information Systems	Goiânia
Zootecnia	Zootechny	Jataí

== See also ==
- List of federal universities of Brazil
