= São Luís de Montes Belos =

- Municipality
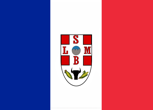
- Flag Coat of arms

- Location in Goiás state

- Location in Brazil
- Coordinates: 16°31′20″S 50°22′44″W
- Country: Brazil
- Region: Central-West
- State: Goiás
- Microregion: Anicuns

Area
  - Total: 826.2 km^{2} (319.0 sq mi)
- Elevation: 579 m (1,900 ft)

Population (2020)
  - Total: 34,157
  - Density: 41.34/km^{2} (107.1/sq mi)
- Time zone: UTC−3 (BRT)
- Postal code: 76100-000
- Website: saoluisdemontesbelos.go.gov.br

São Luís de Montes Belos (also written São Luis de Montes Belos) is a municipality in the State of Goiás, Brazil.

== Location ==
It is located in the Anicuns Microregion, 123 kilometers from the state capital, Goiânia, to which it is connected by highway GO-060. It is bounded by the following municipalities: Sanclerlândia, Adelândia, Turvânia, Firminópolis, Aurilândia, Sanclerlândia and Córrego do Ouro. The distance to Goiânia is 129 km. Highway communications are made by GO-060 / Trindade / Nazário / Turvânia / Firminópolis.

== Demographics ==
The population density was 32.42 inhabitants/km^{2} (2007). The urban population was 23,439 and the rural population was 3,345 (2007).

== Geography ==
The average elevation is 630 meters above sea level and most of the land is flat or hilly. There are many rivers, the most important being the Fartura, Cerrado, and São Domingos. The main streams are the Santana, Santa Rosa, São Manoel and Diamantina. The climate of the region is hot and semi-humid, with an average temperature ranging from 27 °C fto 28 °C. According to the weather station in São Luís, the minimum temperature is 19 °C and the maximum, 35 °C.

== The economy ==
Cattle raising is the most important economic activity in São Luís. The pasture land is extensive and the main breeds raised are Gir and Nelore. Most cattle are shipped out to be slaughtered in larger urban centers. Swine, poultry, and horse raising are also important activities, as well as traditional agriculture. The size of the cattle herd was 120,000 in 2006. IBGE

Milk production is important in the region and there are two dairies. The town has been chosen to implement a Technological Milk Center (Centro Tecnológico do Leite (CTL)), which will be a training site for the technicians who assist the cattle farmers.

The main natural resource is wood, which is used in construction and in the furniture industry. This small furniture industry has given the town the rather exaggerated nickname, ""Capital Industrial do Oeste Goiano"". The main agricultural products are bananas 425 hectares, hearts of palm, rice, and corn.

== Education and health ==
There was a campus of the UEG - Faculdade de Educação, Ciências e Letras de São Luiz de Montes Belos (763 students in 2004) The adult literacy rate was 87.9% (2000) (the national average was 86.4%). In the health sector there were 2 hospitals with 72 beds (2006). The infant mortality rate was 26.08 (2000) (national average was 33.0). On the Municipal Human Development Index São Luís had a classification of 0.752. This ranked it 71 out of 242 municipalities in the state and 1,812 out of 5,507 municipalities in the country (2000).

For the complete list see frigoletto.com.br

== History ==
The settlement of São Luís began in 1857 with a ranch belonging to the Neto family. This was near a stream flowing near the São Luíz hills, where there were fertile lands that lent themselves to the cultivation of sugar cane and the raising of cattle. The founder, José Neto Cerqueira Leão Sobrinho gave the name of São Luíz de Montes Belos in honor of Saint Louis and the beautiful hills nearby. In 1948 it was raised to the category of district belonging to Goiás. In 1953 it became a municipality. The spelling of the name "Luís" is sometimes with "z" instead of "s" and is often without the accent on the letter "i". Official spelling used by Seplan is São Luis de Montes Belos. The first mayor was "Nenen de Brito", Deusdedit de Brito, his birth certificate name; respectful man who continually served the people of São Luis de Montes Belos as a representative for 28 years.

The first Mayor was "Nenen de Brito", Deusdedit Brito.

== See also ==
- List of municipalities in Goiás
- Microregions of Goiás
