= Anicuns =

- Municipality
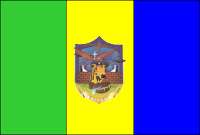
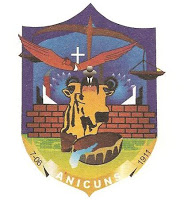
- Flag Coat of arms

- Location in Goiás state

- Location in Brazil
- Coordinates: 16°27′46″S 49°57′38″W
- Country: Brazil
- Region: Central-West
- State: Goiás
- Microregion: Anicuns Microregion

Area
  - Total: 1,750.0 km^{2} (675.7 sq mi)
- Elevation: 692 m (2,270 ft)

Population (2020)
  - Total: 21,981
  - Density: 12.561/km^{2} (32.532/sq mi)
- Time zone: UTC−3 (BRT)
- Postal code: 76170-000
- Website: anicuns.go.gov.br

Anicuns is a city and municipality in central Goiás state, Brazil.

== Geographys ==
Anicuns is located in the Anicuns Microregion, which includes 13 cities with a population of 103276 inhabitants in a total area of 5483.10 km^{2}. It forms boundaries with the following the municipalities:

- North and Northeast: Itaberaí, Mossâmedes and Aurilândia
- South: Nazário and Palmeiras de Goiás
- East: Inhumas and Trindade
- West: São Luís de Montes Belos

The distance to Goiânia is 86 km. Highway connections are made by GO-060 / Trindade / Claudinápolis de Goiás / GO-326. See Seplan

Anicuns is situated on the right bank of the Rio dos Bois, the main river in the region and a tributary of the Paranaíba River. The important Rio Turvo also has its source in the municipality. The average elevation is 600 meters. The climate is tropical humid and the average annual temperature is 23 °C.

Districts, Villages and Hamlets

- Districts: Capelinha and Choupana.
- Village: Poncionário.
- Hamlet: Boa Vista.

== Demographics ==
- Population density: 18.41 inhabitants/km^{2} (2007)
- Population growth rate: -0.13%
- Population in 1980: 23,150
- Population in 2007: 17,705
- Urban population: 15,228

== The economy ==
Economically, Anicuns has a variety of industrial activities. It produces bricks and tiles (six brickworks) and has 16 small shoe factories, specializing in leather boots. There is also cattle raising, both for meat and dairy, together with growing of sugarcane, coffee, and corn. There were three financial institutions in 2004: Banco do Brasil, Bradesco, and Itaú S.A. There was also an alcohol distillery using the availability of sugarcane. Most of the workers were engaged in transformation industries, public administration, and commerce. (IBGE 2005)

- Industrial establishments: 39
- Retail commercial establishments: 185
- Dairy: LEE Laticínios Ltda. (22/05/2006)
- Distillery: Anicuns S/A Álcool e Derivados (July/2007)
- Industrial park: Distrito Agroindustrial de Anicuns (June/2006)

Agricultural Data

- Number of farms: 1,237
- Total farming area: 52,201 ha.
- Planted area: 13,100 ha.
- Area of natural pasture: 33,078
- Persons working in agriculture: 4,500
- Number of cattle (head): 115.400
- Area of corn: 4,200 ha.
- Area of rice: 800 ha.
- Area of sugarcane: 7,000 ha.
- Area of soybeans: 400 ha.
- Area of banana: 150 ha.
- Area of coffee: 230 ha.

== Health and education ==
In the health sector there were 6 hospitals with 142 hospital beds. The infant mortality rate was 38.99 in 2000. (IBGE 2002). In the educational sector there were 17 primary schools and 4 secondary schools. There was a campus of the state university. The literacy rate was 85.8% in 2000.

Municipal Human Development Index

- MHDI: 0.720
- State ranking: 173 (out of 242 municipalities)
- National ranking: 2,616 (out of 5,507 municipalities)

All data are from 2000

== Origin of the name ==
The name of the city comes from the Guanicuns Indians, who would hunt a bird with the same name (extinct). The anicuns bird was known for its beautiful feathers and song. The Indians made adornments from the feathers and ate the bird's tongue believing that it would allow them to imitate its beautiful singing.

== History ==
Anicuns had its beginnings with the search for gold in the rivers. After the gold had run out the settlers stayed to raise cattle and grow crops. In 1841 Anicuns was already a district of the municipality of Palmeiras, becoming a municipality in 1911. In 1931 the name was changed from Anicuns to Novo Horizonte. In 1933 the district of Nazário was created to become part of Novo Horizonte. In 1938 the name was changed back to Anicuns. In 1952 Nazário separated to become a municipality.

== Tourism ==
Anicuns has taken advantage of the Rio dos Bois to put on a canoe championship called Copa Brasil de Canoagem, which is accompanied by parades, cultural activities and regional musical shows. The competition, lasting three days, is one of the most important in the country.

Tourist sites: · Poço do Boi de Ouro: craters with a depth of 30 meters. · Serra do Felipe: much used in hang gliding. · Morro do Chapéu: highest point in the region. · Morro de Monte Castelo: 7 km from the center of town, still has native forest on the top of the mountain. · Serra da Canjica: only 3 km from the town, is next to the São José Jica waterfall, with a rocky wall and a free fall of more than 70 meters · Cachoeira São José: 2 km from the town, the place is made up of rapids and small waterfalls.

== See also ==
- List of municipalities in Goiás
- Microregions of Goiás
