= Military Police of Goiás State =

Auxiliary police of the Brazilian state of Goiás

Military Police of Goiás State Polícia Militar do Estado de Goiás
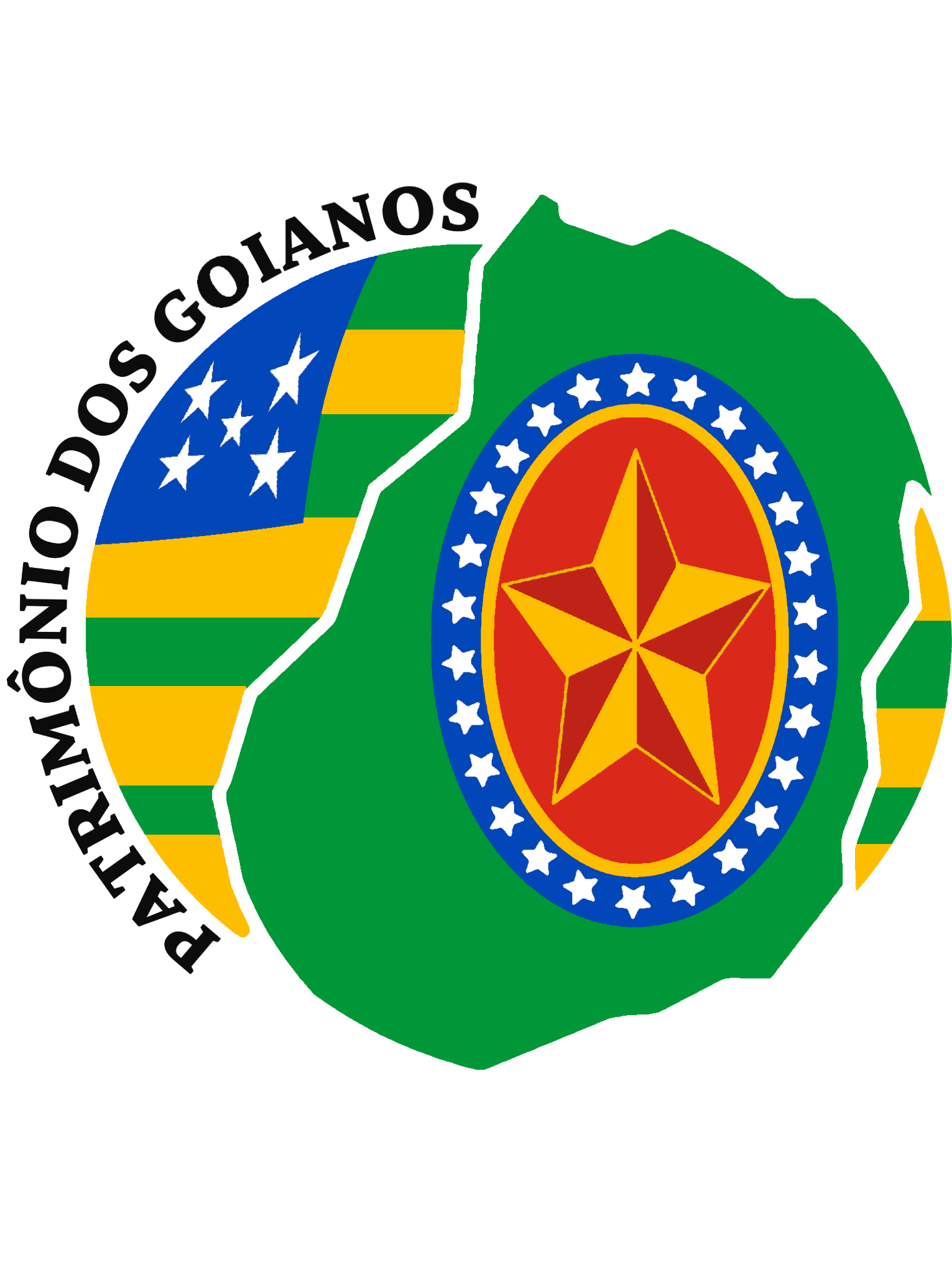
- Abbreviation: PMGO

Agency overview
- Formed: July 28, 1858

Jurisdictional structure
- Operations jurisdiction: Goias, Brazil
- Map of police jurisdiction.
- Area: 340,086 km^{2} (131,308 sq mi)
- Population: 5.926.300 (2009)
- Constituting instrument: Article 42 of Constitution of Brazil
- General nature: Gendarmerie

Operational structure
- Headquarters: Goiânia

Website
- www.pm.go.gov.br/2008

The Military Police of Goiás State (Portuguese: Polícia Militar do Estado de Goiás) are the preventive police force of the state of Goiás. In Brazil, Military Police are reserve and ancillary forces of the Brazilian Army, and part of the System of Public Security and Brazilian Social Protection. Its members are called "State Military" personnel.

== Organization ==
The Military Police of Goiás State is formed by battalions, companies, and platoons. The battalions (Portuguese: Batalhão de Polícia Militar - BPM) and independent companies (Portuguese: Companhia Independente de Polícia Militar - CIPM) are organized into Regional Commands (Portuguese: Comandos Regionais de Polícia Militar - CRPM). These Commands are in major urban centers, and their battalions and companies are distributed according to population density in cities.

=== Regional commands of Military Police ===
1st CRPM - Goiânia

- 1st Battalion - Goiânia;
- 7th Battalion - Goiânia;
- 9th Battalion - Goiânia;
- 13th Battalion - Goiânia;
  - 1st Independent Company - Goiânia;
  - 6th Independent Company - Goiânia;
  - 9th Independent Company - Goiânia;
  - 15th Independent Company - Goiânia;
  - 28th Independent Company - Goiânia;
  - 29th Independent Company - Goiânia.

2nd CRPM - Aparecida de Goiânia

- 8th BPM - Aparecida de Goiânia;
- 22nd BPM - Trindade;
  - 8th CIPM - Aparecida de Goiânia;
  - 16th CIPM - Aparecida de Goiânia;
  - 17th CIPM - Senador Canedo;
  - 25th CIPM - Aparecida de Goiânia;
  - 26th CIPM - Aparecida de Goiânia.

3rd CRPM - Anápolis

- 4th BPM - Anápolis;
  - 18th CIPM - Pirenópolis;
  - 23rd CIPM - Inhumas;
  - 24th CIPM - Anápolis.

4th CRPM - Goiás

- 6th BPM - Goiás;
  - 19th CIPM - Jussara.

5th CRPM - Luziânia

- 10th - BPM - Luziânia;
- 17th BPM - Águas Lindas de Goiás;
- 19th BPM - Novo Gama;
- 20th BPM - Valparaíso de Goiás;
  - 2nd CIPM - Luziânia;
  - 3rd CIPM - Cidade Ocidental;
  - 11th CIPM - Santo Antônio do Descoberto;
  - 25th CIPM - Aguas Lindas de Goiás;
  - 32nd CIPM - Cristalina;
  - 36th CIPM - Padre Bernardo.

6th CRPM - Itumbiara

- 5th BPM - Itumbiara;
  - 10th CIPM - Morrinhos;
  - 14th CIPM - Caldas Novas;
  - 20th CIPM - Goiatuba.

7th CRPM - Iporá

- 12th BPM - Iporá;
- 25th BPM - Palmeiras de Goias;
  - 4th CIPM - Aragarças.

8th CRPM - Rio Verde

- 2nd - BPM - Rio Verde;
  - 5th CIPM - Indiara;
  - 12th CIPM - Quirinópolis.

9th CRPM - Catalão

- 18th BPM - Catalão;
- 11th BPM - Pires do Rio.

10th CRPM - Ceres

- 14th BPM - Uruaçu;
- 23rd BPM - Goianésia;
  - 22nd CIPM - Ceres.

11th CRPM - Formosa

- 16th BPM - Formosa;
- 21st BPM - Planaltina de Goiás.

12th CRPM - Porangatu

- 3rd BPM - Porangatu;
  - 13th CIPM - São Miguel do Araguaia.

13th CRPM - Posse

- 24th BPM - Posse.

14th CRPM - Jataí

- 15th BPM - Jataí;
  - 7th CIPM - Mineiros.

=== Special Units ===
- Regiment of Mounted Police;
- Battalion of Riot Control;
- Battalion of Highway Patrol;
- Battalion of Environmental Police;
- Battalion of Control of Urban Traffic.

== See also ==
- Military Firefighters Corps (Brazil)
- Brazilian Federal Police
- Federal Highway Police
- Brazilian Civil Police
- Brazilian Armed Forces
- Military Police
- Gendarmerie
