= Novo Gama =

- Municipality
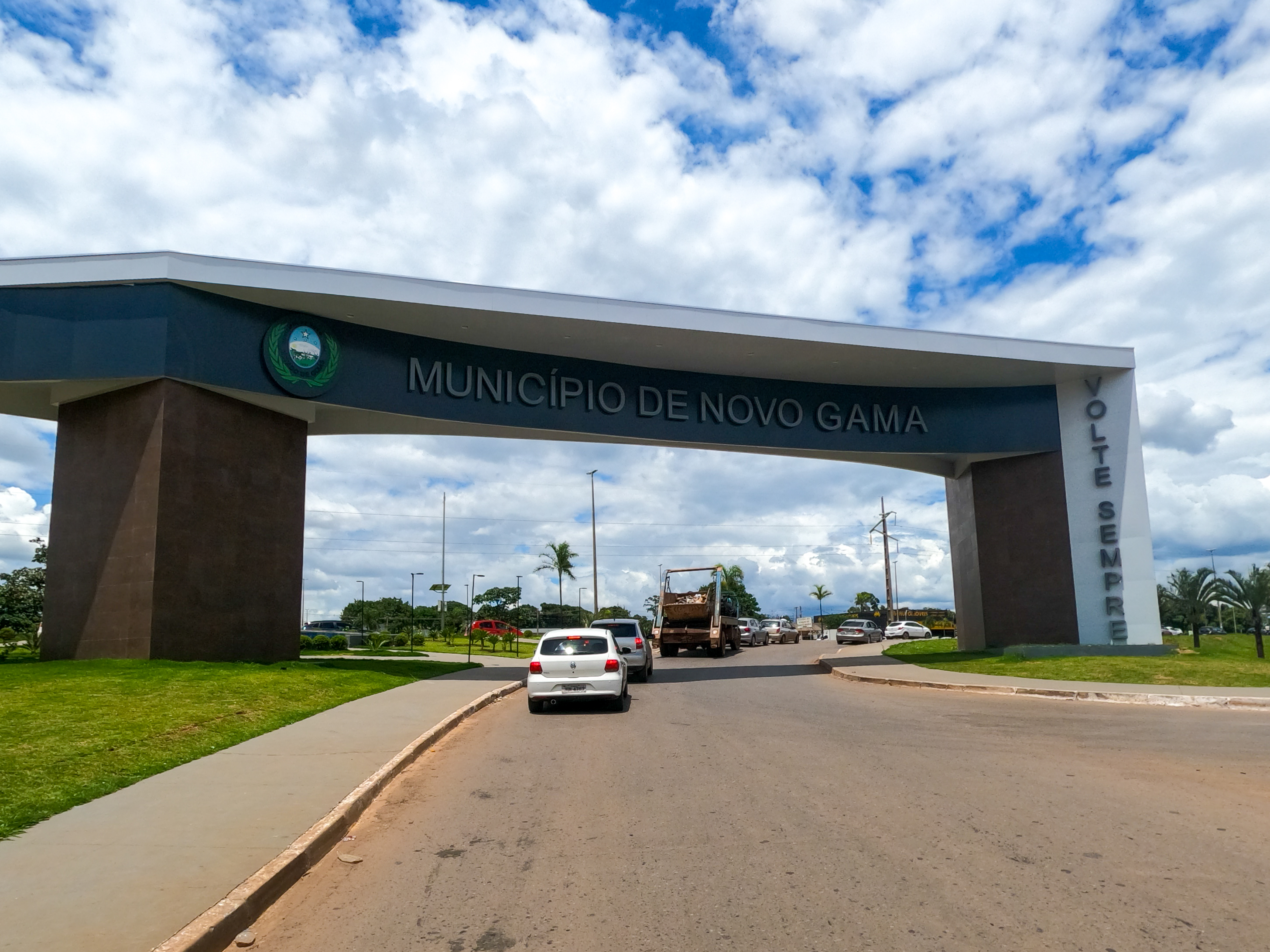

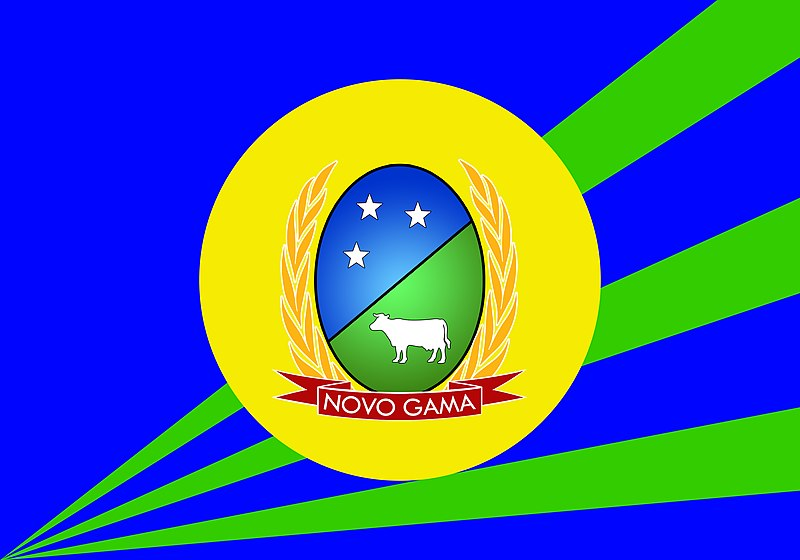
- Flag

- Location in Goiás state

- Location in Brazil
- Coordinates: 16°03′13″S 48°01′46″W
- Country: Brazil
- Region: Central-West
- State: Goiás
- Microregion: Entorno do Distrito Federal

Government
  - Mayor: Sonia Chavez (PSDB)

Area
  - Total: 191.6 km^{2} (74.0 sq mi)
- Elevation: 1,100 m (3,600 ft)

Population (2022 Census)
  - Total: 103,804
  - Estimate (2025): 107,663
  - Density: 541.8/km^{2} (1,403/sq mi)
- Time zone: UTC−3 (BRT)
- Postal code: 72860-000

Novo Gama is a municipality in eastern Goiás state, Brazil. In 2022 Census the population was 103,804 inhabitants.

== Geography ==
=== Location ===
Novo Gama is part of the Entorno do Distrito Federal, the statistical micro-region that includes the cities in the state of Goiás that surround the Federal District. It is 190 kilometers from the state capital of Goiânia and 40 kilometers from the national capital of Brasília, being located in the fast-growing urban conurbation south of Brasília, which includes Valparaíso de Goiás, Cidade Ocidental, and Luziânia. The main highways that provide access to the city are: DF-060, 020, 040, and BR-040.

Municipal boundaries are with:

- North: Federal District
- South: Luziânia
- East: Cidade Ocidental
- West: Santo Antônio do Descoberto

== Demographics ==
In 2007 the population density was 436.15 inhabitants/km^{2}. In 2007 there were 81,668 inhabitants in the urban area and 1,931 inhabitants in the rural area. The population has been growing rapidly since the first census of 2000.

The industrial sector is growing, with factories of bricks and tiles, milk processing, sweets and meat processing. A large part of the population works in Brasília and travels back and forth by bus. Workers often have to take two or more buses. On Sunday there is the traditional Feira do Pedregal, considered the third largest market in the Central-West region.

== Economy ==
Few inhabitants make their living from agriculture. In 2006 there were 6,400 head of cattle and modest production of rice, bananas, sugarcane, beans, oranges, guava, manioc, and tangerines.

== Health and Education ==
In 2006 there were no hospitals. In 2000 the infant mortality rate was 24.95, well below the national average of 33.0. In 2006 the school system had 51 schools and 25,403 students. There were no institutions of higher learning. In 2000 the adult literacy rate was 89.0%, higher than the national average of 86.4%. Human Development Index: 0.742

- State ranking: 100 (out of 242 municipalities)
- National ranking: 2,096 (out of 5,507 municipalities)

== History ==
Novo Gama first appeared in 1974, with the housing development called Parque Estrela D'Alva VI. The population increased due to the great migratory influx, mainly from the Northeast and Goiás. Because of the rocky soil the place was popularly known as Pedregal. The region was then part of the municipality of Luziânia.

The project of the creation of Núcleo Habitacional Novo Gama arose from popular movements associated with the famous open-air market of Pedregal. The Núcleo Habitacional Novo Gama was created in t1980, by a real estate group called Economisa. With the fast population growth Luziânia recognized the necessity of dividing the space in districts, and the place was called district of Novo Gama. In 1995 it became independent of Luziânia.

For the complete list see frigoletto.com.br

== See also ==
- List of municipalities in Goiás
- Microregions of Goiás
