= Luziânia Airport =

Brig. Araripe Macedo Airport Aeroporto Brig. Araripe Macedo
- IATA: none; ICAO: SWUZ; LID: GO0025

Summary
- Airport type: Public
- Operator: Infraero (2024–present)
- Serves: Luziânia
- Time zone: BRT (UTC−03:00)
- Elevation AMSL: 996 m (3,268 ft)
- Coordinates: 16°15′42″S 047°58′07″W
- Website: www4.infraero.gov.br/aeroporto-de-luziania/

Map
- Location in Brazil

Runways
Direction	Length		Surface
Direction	m	ft	Surface
11/29	1,200	3,937	Asphalt

Statistics (2025)
- Passengers: 144
- Aircraft Operations: 2,551
- Statistics: Infraero; Sources: Airport Website, ANAC, DECEA

Brigadeiro Araripe Macedo Airport (ICAO: SWUZ), is the airport serving Luziânia, Brazil.

It is operated by Infraero.

== History ==
On November 27, 2024, the airport started being operated by Infraero.

== Access ==
The airport is located 2 km (1 mi) from downtown Luziânia.

== See also ==
- List of airports in Brazil
