= Diego Sorgatto =

Brazilian politician (born 1990)

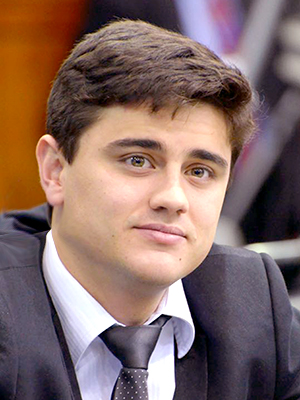
- Sorgatto in 2017

Mayor of Luziânia
- Incumbent
- Assumed office 1 January 2021
- Preceded by: Professora Edna

Personal details
- Born: 10 August 1990 (age 36)
- Party: Brazil Union (since 2022)

Diego Vaz Sorgatto (born 10 August 1990) is a Brazilian politician serving as mayor of Luziânia since 2021. From 2015 to 2020, he was a member of the Legislative Assembly of Goiás.
