= Goiás =

State of Brazil

- State
- Flag Coat of arms
- Nickname(s): Verdão and Esmeraldino
- Motto(s): Terra Querida, fruto da vida (Portuguese) "Beloved land, fruit of life"
- Anthem: Hino de Goiás
- Location in Brazil
- Coordinates: 15°56′S 50°8′Wcoordinates are the middle of Goiás
- Country: Brazil
- Region: Central-West
- Capital and largest city: Goiânia

Government
  - Type: Unitary state
  - Governor: Daniel Vilela (MDB)
  - Vice Governor: Vacant
  - Senators: Jorge Kajuru (PSB); Vanderlan Cardoso (PSD); Wilder Morais (PL)
  - Legislature: Legislative Assembly of Goiás

Area
  - Total: 340,086 km^{2} (131,308 sq mi)
  - Rank: 7th

Population (2025)
  - Total: 7,423,629
  - Rank: 11th
  - Density: 21.8287/km^{2} (56.5360/sq mi)
  - Rank: 19th
- Demonym: Goiano

GDP (2024)
  - Total: R$357.145 billion (US$66.274 billion)

HDI
  - Year: 2024
  - Category: 0.815 – very high (7th)
- Time zone: UTC-3 (BRT)
- Postal Code: 73700-000 to 76790-000
- ISO 3166 code: BR-GO
- Website: goias.gov.br

Goiás (English: /ɡɔɪˈɑːs/, UK also /ɡɔɪˈæs/; Brazilian Portuguese: [ɡo(j)ˈjas]) is a Brazilian state located in the Central-West region. Goiás borders the Federal District and the states of (from north clockwise) Tocantins, Bahia, Minas Gerais, Mato Grosso do Sul and Mato Grosso. The state capital is Goiânia. With 7.2 million inhabitants, Goiás is the most populous state in the Central-West region and the 11th most populous in the country. It has the ninth largest economy among Brazilian federative units. In Brazil's geoeconomic division, Goiás belongs to the Centro-Sul (Center-South), being the northernmost state of the southern portion of Brazil. The state has 3.3% of the Brazilian population and is responsible for 2.7% of the Brazilian GDP.

The history of Goiás dates back to the beginning of the 18th century, with the arrival of pioneers from São Paulo. The Rio Vermelho region was the first to be occupied, where Vila Boa (later renamed Goiás) was founded. The development and settlement of the state took place, in a more intensified way, starting in the 1930s with the founding of the new capital, Goiânia, and especially with the construction of Brasília in the 1950s.

Goiás is characterized by a landscape of chapadões (plateaus). In the height of the drought season, from June to September, the lack of rain makes the level of the Araguaia River go down and exposes almost 2 kilometres (1.2 mi) of beaches. At the Emas National Park in the municipality of Mineiros, it is possible to observe the typical fauna and flora from the region. At the Chapada dos Veadeiros the main attractions are the canyons, valleys, rapids and waterfalls. Other attractions include the historical city of Goiás and the hot springs of Caldas Novas.

As a symbolic landmark and tribute to the former capital, the state government moves its headquarters to the city of Goiás annually on the day commemorating its founding, June 25th, since 1962.

== Geography ==
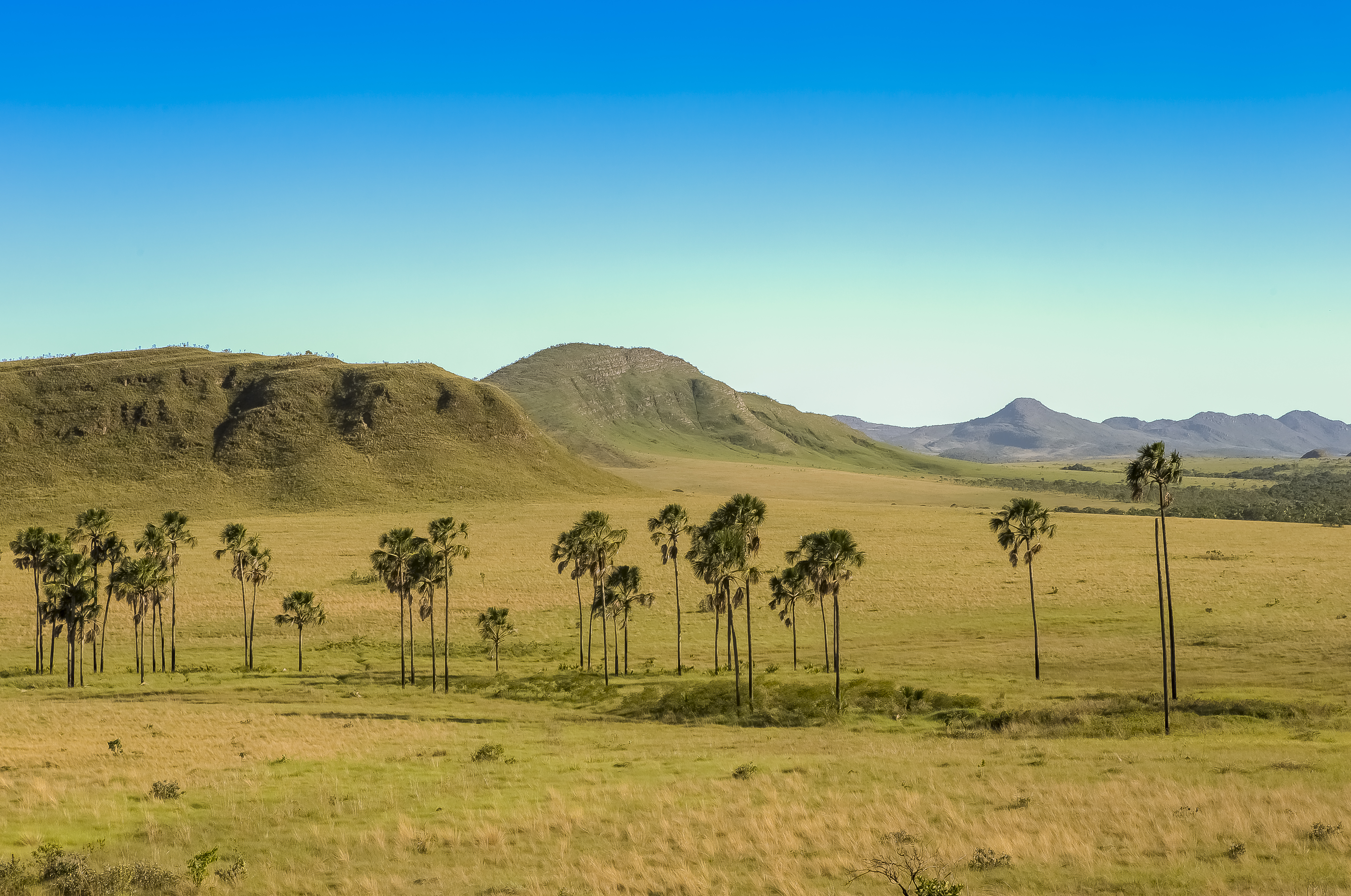
Chapada dos Veadeiros National Park

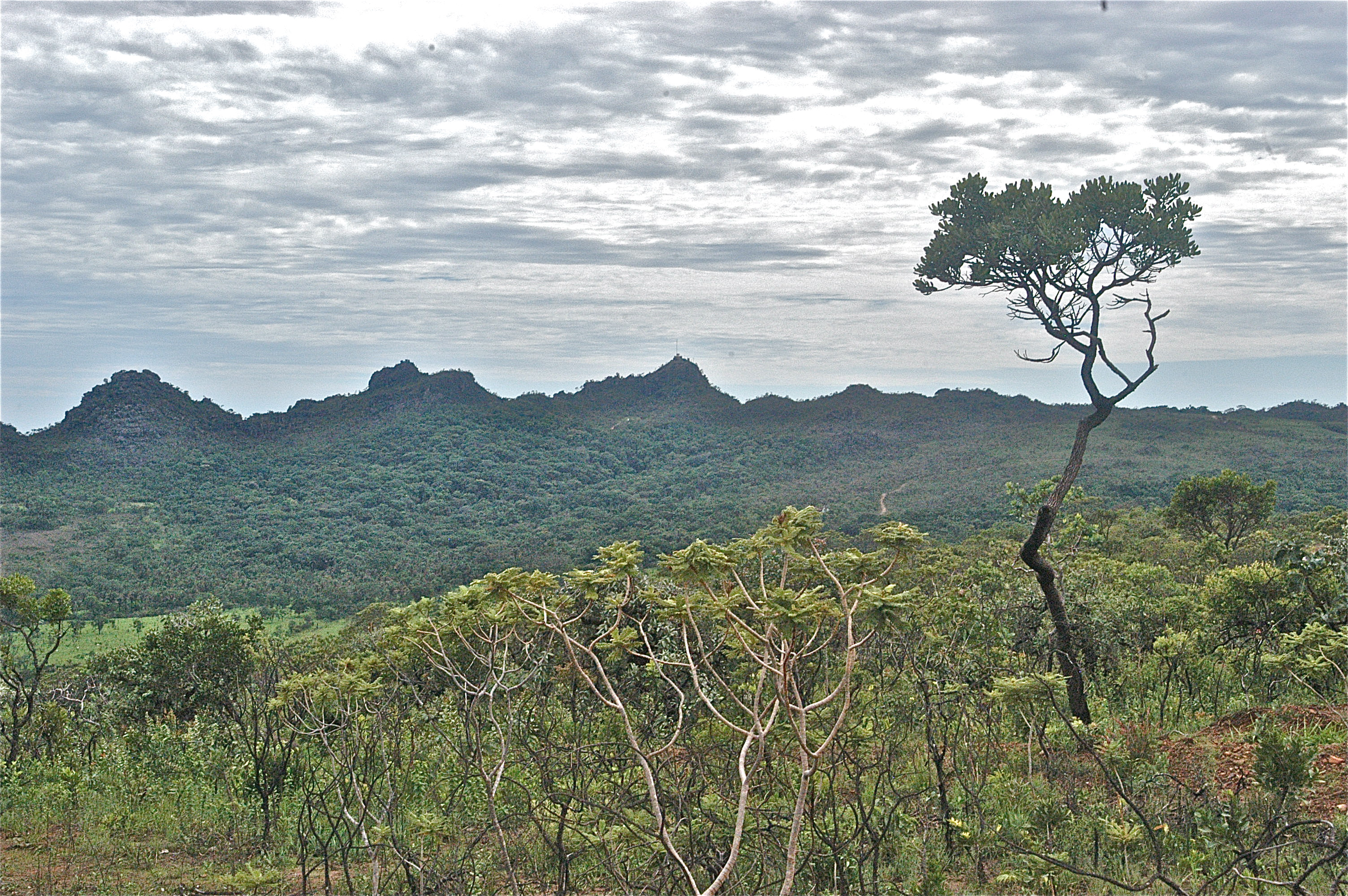
Serra dos Pirineus in Goiás

Goiás occupies a large plateau, the vast almost level surface of which stands between 750 and 900 m above sea level and forms the divide between three of Brazil's largest river systems: to the south, Goiás is drained by the Paranaíba river, a tributary of the Paraná River; to the east it is drained by tributaries of the São Francisco River; and northward the state is drained by the Araguaia River and the Tocantins River and their tributaries. Other major rivers in the state are the Meia Ponte, Aporé, São Marcos, Corumbá River, Claro, Maranhão, Paranã and Preto. None of these rivers is navigable except for short distances by small craft.

The state's highest point is Pouso Alto, at 1,676 metres (5,499 ft) above sea level, in the Chapada dos Veadeiros.

Goiás is covered with a woodland savanna known in Brazil as campo cerrado, although there are still tropical forests along the rivers. The climate of the plateau is tropical. Average monthly temperatures vary from 26 °C (79 °F) in the warmest month to 22 °C (72 °F) in the coldest. The year is divided into a rainy season (October–March) and a dry season (April–September). Average annual rainfall is about 1,700 millimetres (67 in), but this varies due to elevation and microclimate. Some parts of the state, however, have small remnants of tropical Atlantic forest, that mostly appears around rivers and valleys.

The Great Midwest Region, consisting of the states of Goiás, Mato Grosso, Mato Grosso do Sul, and the Federal District, is among the fastest-growing regions of Brazil. The population of Goiás state tripled in size in the period from 1950 to 1980 and is still growing very quickly. However, outside the Federal District and the Goiânia metropolitan region (with a population of over a million) most of Goiás is very thinly populated. The chief concentration of settlement is in the southeast, in the area of Goiânia (Goiânia and Aparecida de Goiânia), across the border from Minas Gerais (Catalão, Rio Verde, Jataí, and Caldas Novas), and around the Federal District (Formosa, Planaltina de Goiás, and Luziânia).

== History ==
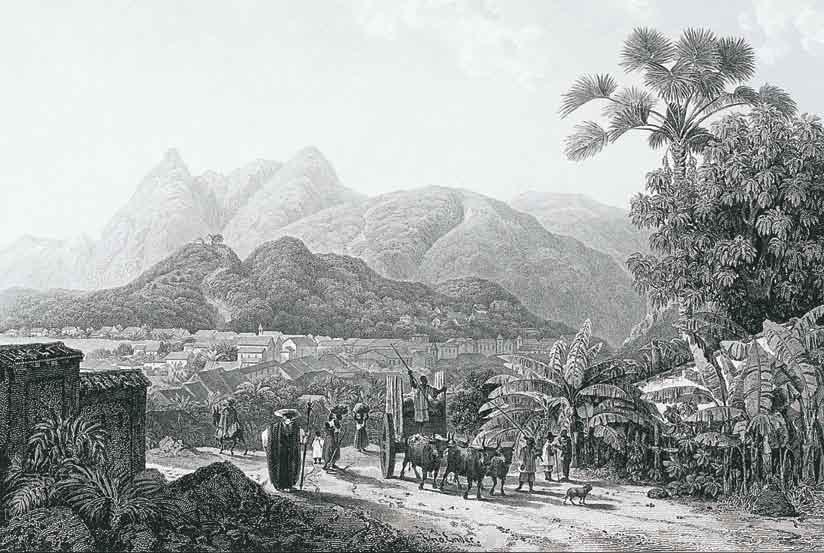
The Province of Goiás in 1830, during the Empire of Brazil

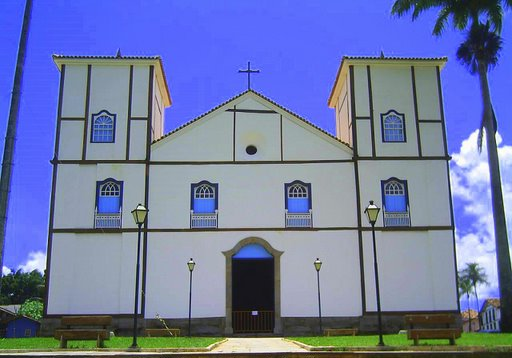
The Church of Pirenópolis, the oldest Baroque Catholic church in Goiás, built in 1728

The first European exploration of this interior part of Brazil was carried out by expeditions from São Paulo in the 17th century. Gold was discovered in the gravel of a tributary of the Araguaia River by the bandeirante Bartolomeu Bueno da Silva (the Anhanguera) in 1682. The settlement he founded there, called Santa Anna, became the colonial town of Goiás Velho, the former state capital. In 1744 the large inland area, much of it still unexplored by Europeans, was made a Captaincy General, and in 1822 it became a province of the empire of Brazil. It became a state in 1889. The Brazilian constitution of 1891 specified that the nation's capital should be moved to the Brazilian Highlands (Planalto Central), and in 1956 Goiás was selected as the site for the federal district and capital national, Brasília. The seat of the federal government was officially moved to Brasília in 1960.

Goiânia, the largest city and capital was planned in 1933 to replace the old, inaccessible former state capital of Goiás, 110 kilometres (68 mi) northwest. In 1937 the state government moved there, and in 1942 the official inauguration was held. Goiânia is now one of the fastest-growing cities in Brazil and one of the most livable cities in the country. It stands out as both an industrial center (along with the neighboring towns of Anápolis and Aparecida de Goiânia) and as a cultural center for country culture and music, known as Sertanejo.

Due to the relatively large territory of the state, which was over 600,000 square kilometres (230,000 mi^{2}), communications were obviously very difficult. The northern part of the state began to feel abandoned by the southern government and began a movement for separation. Local political leaders also encouraged the movement. In 1988 the northern half of Goiás became a separate state called Tocantins.

== Demographics ==
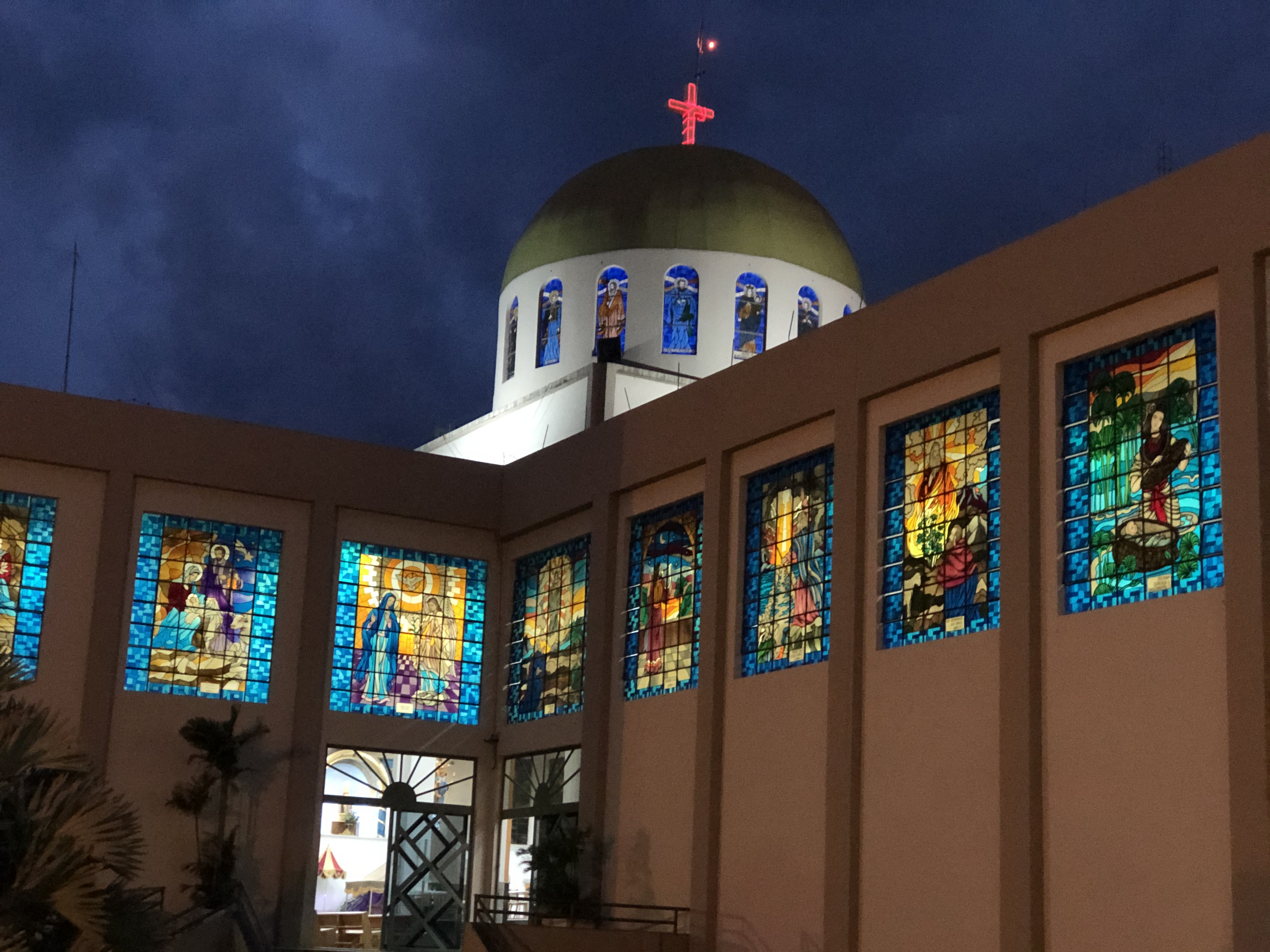
Basilica of the Eternal Father

According to the 2022 census, there were 7,056,495 people residing in the state. The population density was 20.7 inh./km^{2}.

Urbanization: 88.6% (2006); Population growth: 2.5% (1991–2000); Houses: 1,749,000 (2006).

The 2022 census revealed the following numbers: 3,822,864 Pardo (Multiracial) people (54.2%), 2,557,454 White people (36.2%), 648,560 Black people (9.2%), 16,985 Asian people (0.2%), 10,432 Amerindian people (0.1%).

Ethnic groups found in Goiás include: Italians, Amerindians, Portuguese, Africans, Germans, Arabs, Lebanese and Syrian.

According to an autosomal DNA study from 2008, the ancestral composition of Goiás is 83.70% European, 13.30% African and 3.0% Amerindian.

Largest cities or towns in Goiás (2011 census by the Brazilian Institute of Geography and Statistics)
| Rank | | Pop. | Rank | | Pop. |
|---|---|---|---|---|---|
| 1 | Goiânia | 1,516,113 | 11 | Itumbiara | 104,742 |
| 2 | Aparecida de Goiânia | 578,179 | 12 | Jataí | 100,882 |
| 3 | Anápolis | 386,923 | 13 | Catalão | 88,353 |
| 4 | Rio Verde | 235,647 | 14 | Senador Canedo | 87,848 |
| 5 | Luziânia | 212,440 | 15 | Planaltina de Goiás | 82,258 |
| 6 | Águas Lindas de Goiás | 208,299 | 16 | Caldas Novas | 72,071 |
| 7 | Valparaíso de Goiás | 168,468 | 17 | Santo Antônio do Descoberto | 64,119 |
| 8 | Trindade | 127,599 | 18 | Goianésia | 60,346 |
| 9 | Formosa | 121,617 | 19 | Cidade Ocidental | 57,108 |
| 10 | Novo Gama | 115,711 | 20 | Mineiros | 54,003 |

Historical population
| Year | Pop. | ±% |
|---|---|---|
| 1872 | 160,395 | — |
| 1890 | 227,572 | +41.9% |
| 1900 | 255,284 | +12.2% |
| 1920 | 511,919 | +100.5% |
| 1940 | 661,226 | +29.2% |
| 1950 | 1,010,880 | +52.9% |
| 1960 | 1,626,376 | +60.9% |
| 1970 | 2,460,007 | +51.3% |
| 1980 | 3,229,219 | +31.3% |
| 1991 | 4,012,562 | +24.3% |
| 2000 | 5,004,197 | +24.7% |
| 2010 | 6,003,788 | +20.0% |
| 2022 | 7,056,495 | +17.5% |

=== Religion ===
Religion in Goiás (2010)
1. Catholic Church (58.9%)
2. Protestantism (28.1%)
3. Spiritism (2.46%)
4. Other religions (3.38%)
5. Irreligious (8.11%)

According to the Census of the Brazilian Institute of Geography and Statistics (IBGE), in 2010 58.89% of the state's population was Roman Catholic, 28.07% were Protestants or evangelicals, 8.11% had no religion, 2.46% were Spiritists, 0.67% Jehovah's Witnesses, 1.01% other Christian religions (which include the Brazilian Catholic Apostolic Church, Eastern Orthodox Church, Mormonism and others) and 0.79% from other religions.

=== Education ===
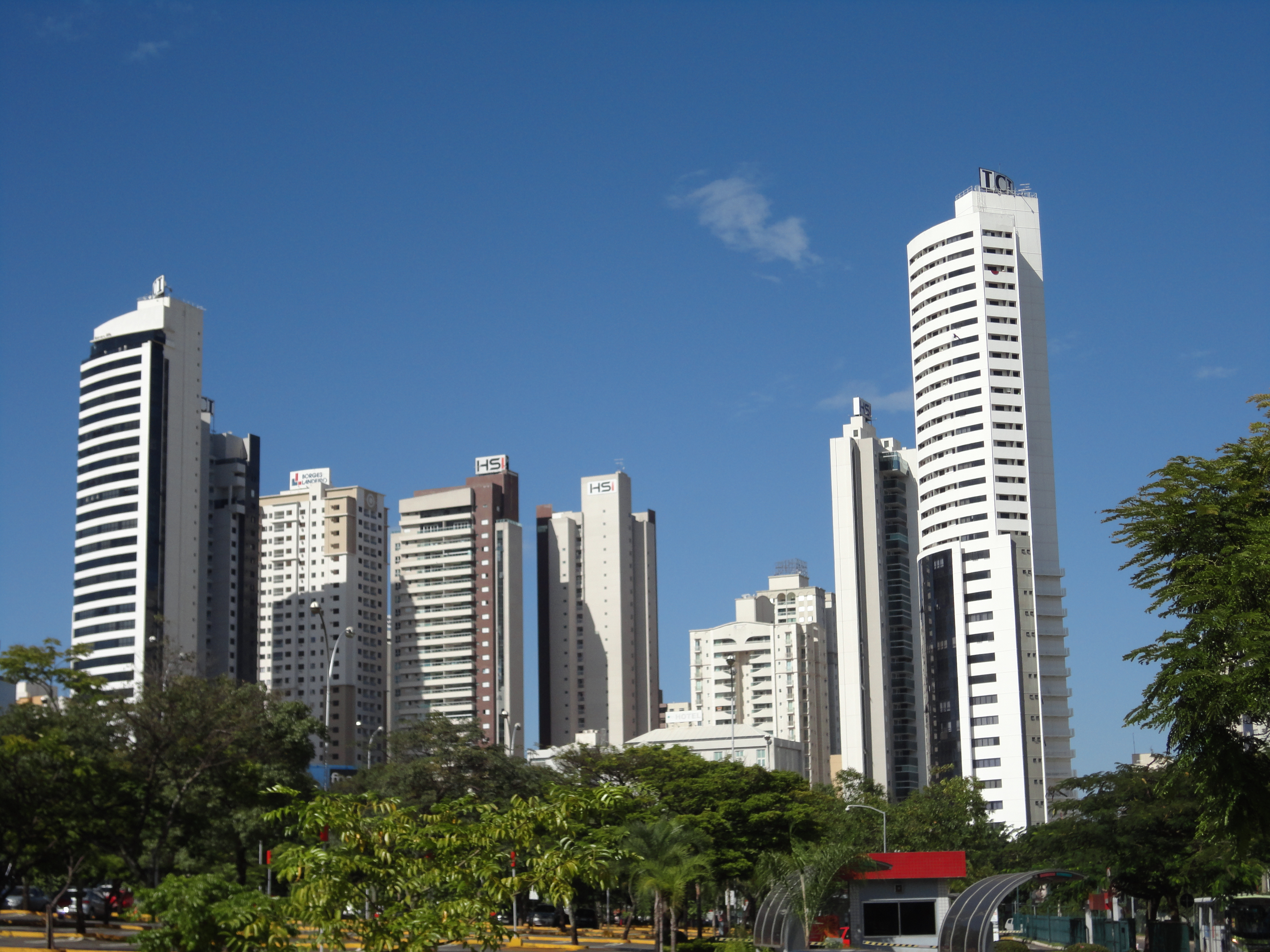
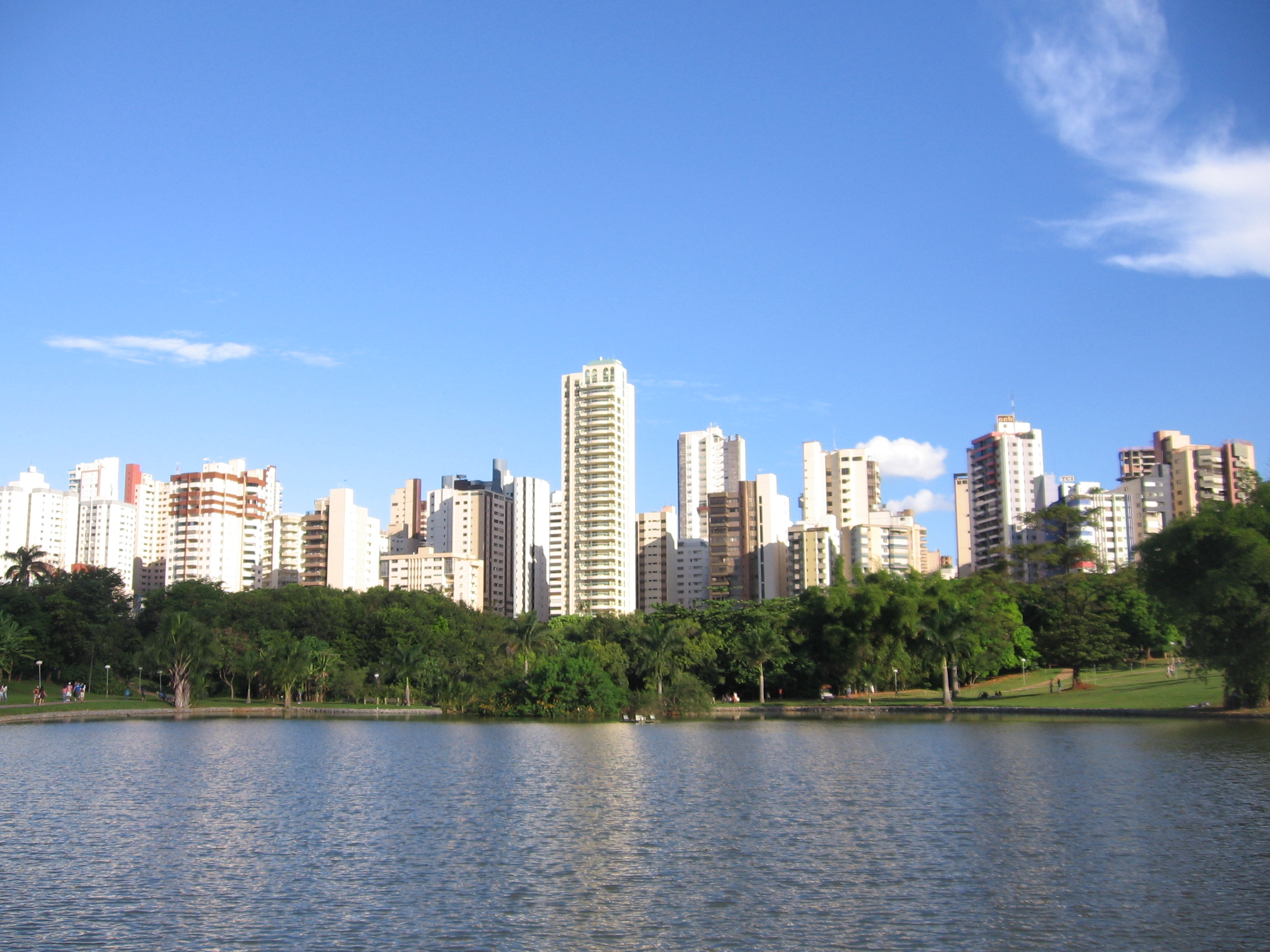
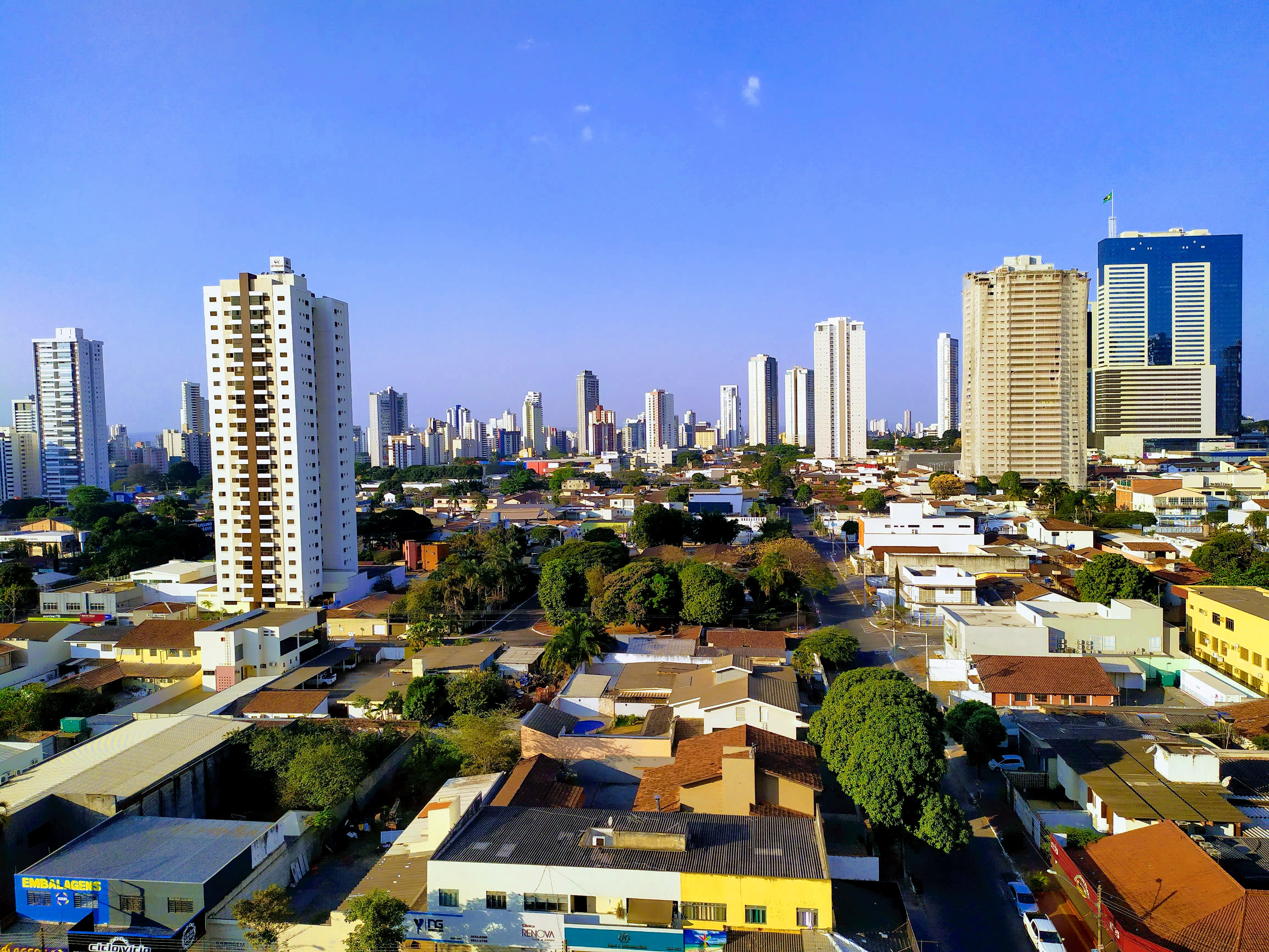
The capital city of Goiânia is the largest city and education center of the state.

Portuguese is the official national language, and thus the primary language taught in schools. English and Spanish, however, are also part of the official high school curriculum.

==== Educational institutions ====
- Universidade Federal de Goiás (UFG);
- Universidade Federal de Jataí (UFJ);
- Pontifícia Universidade Católica de Goiás (PUC GOIÁS);
- Instituto Federal de Educação, Ciência e Tecnologia de Goiás (IFG);
- Instituto Federal de Educação, Ciência e Tecnologia Goiano (IFGoiano);
- Universidade Estadual de Goiás (UEG);
- Universidade Paulista (UNIP Flamboyant);
- Universidade de Rio Verde;
- and many others.

== Economy ==
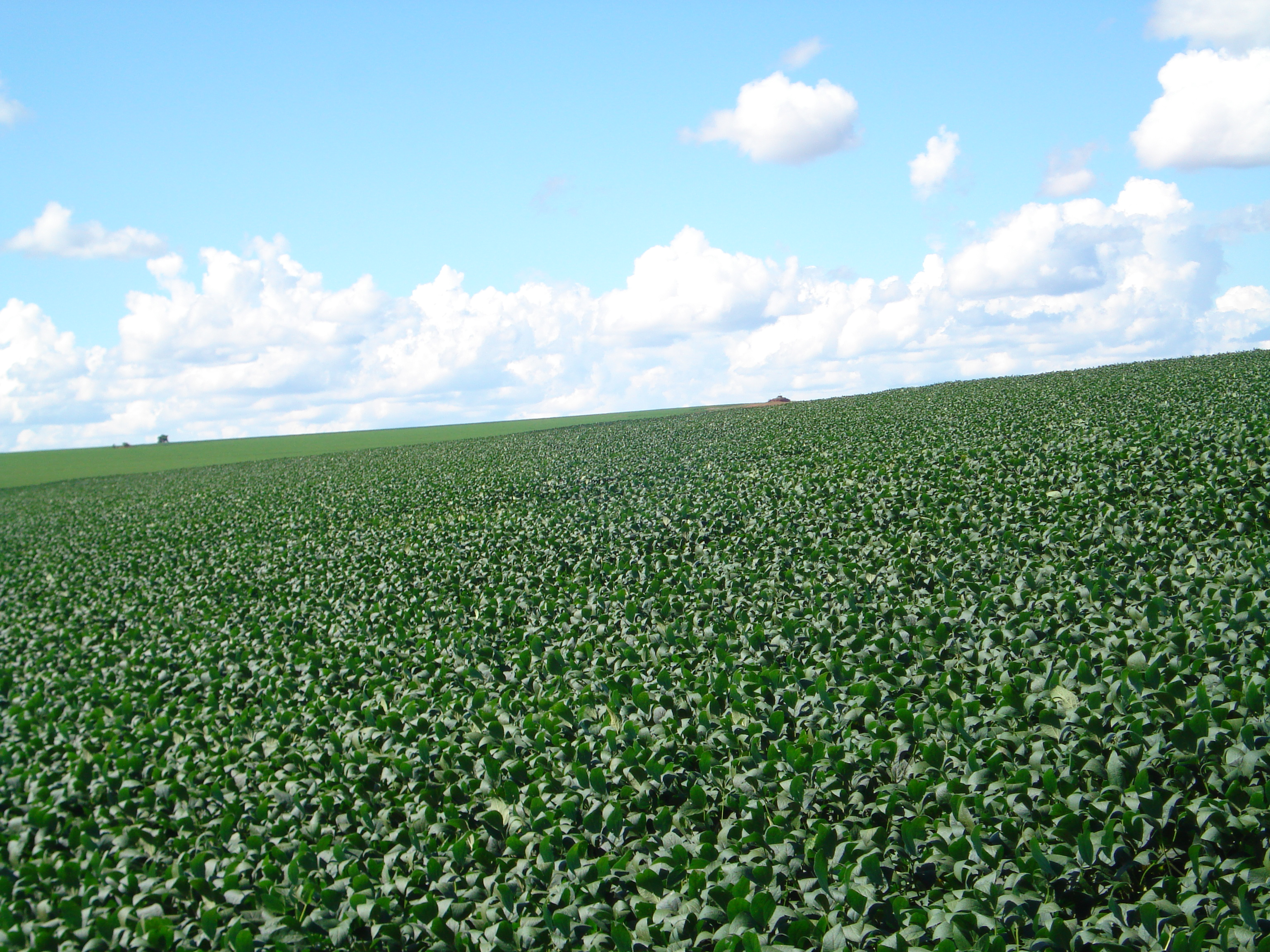
Soybean plantation in Goiás.

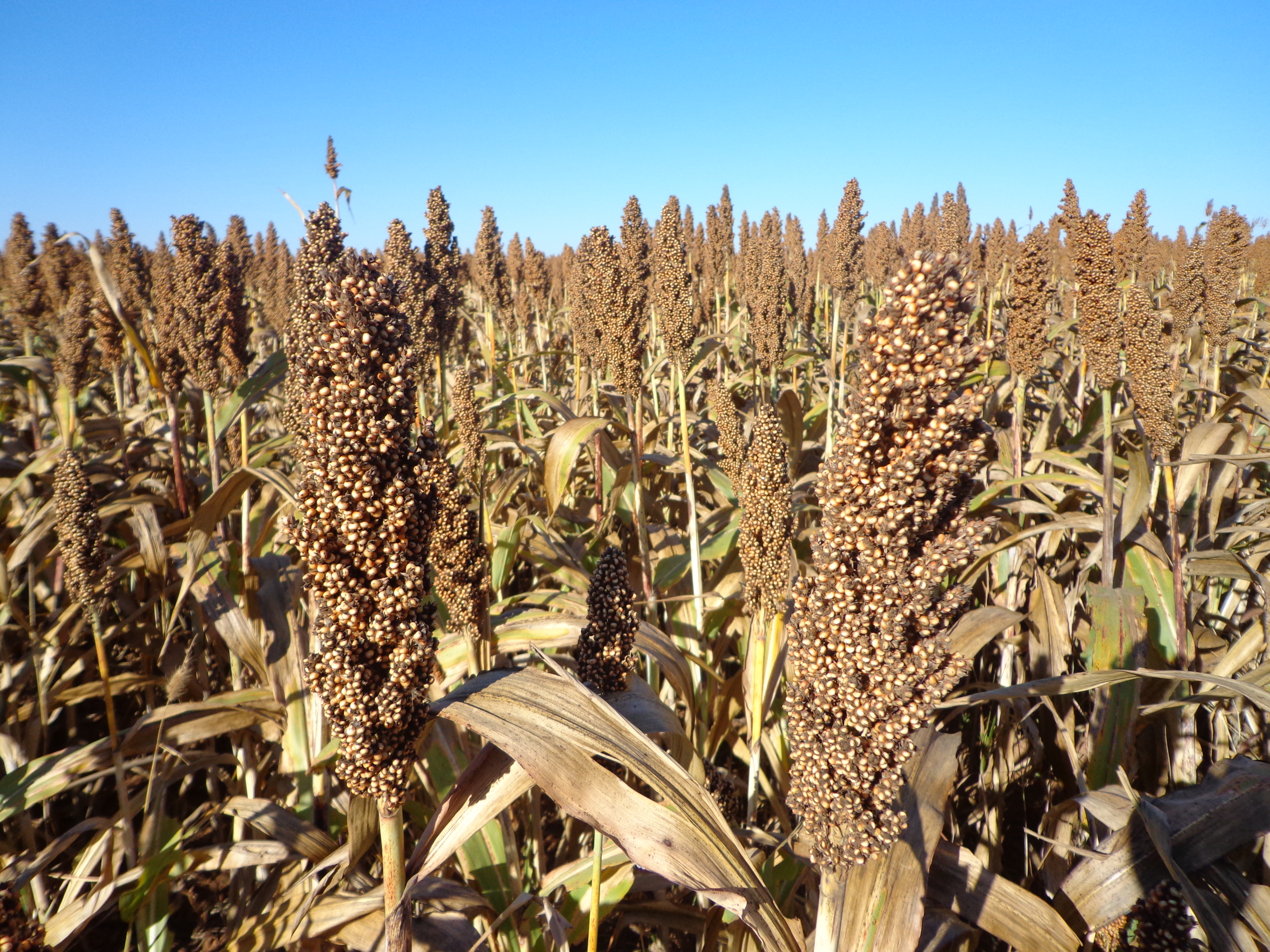
Sorghum production in Cristalina, Goiás

The service sector is the largest component of GDP at 43.9%, followed by the industrial sector at 35.4%. Agriculture represents 20.7%, of GDP (2004). Goiás exports: soybean 49.2%, meat of cattle 10.5%, gold 9.1%, other meat 7.5%, iron 7.4%, leather 4% (2002).

Share of the Brazilian economy: 2.4% (2005).

Goiás is a leader in the country in crop raising. In 2016, Goiás had the 3rd largest cattle herd in Brazil: 22.6 million head of cattle. The number of pigs in Goiás was approximately 2.0 million head in 2015. The State had the 6th largest Brazilian herd, 5% of the national herd. Among the municipalities in Goiás that stood out, Rio Verde had the 3rd largest national population. In 2016, Goiás was the 4th largest milk producer, accounting for 10.1% of the country's milk production. The number of chickens in the State was 64.2 million head in 2015. The production of chicken eggs this year was 188 million dozens. Goiás was the 9th largest producer of eggs, 5% of national production.

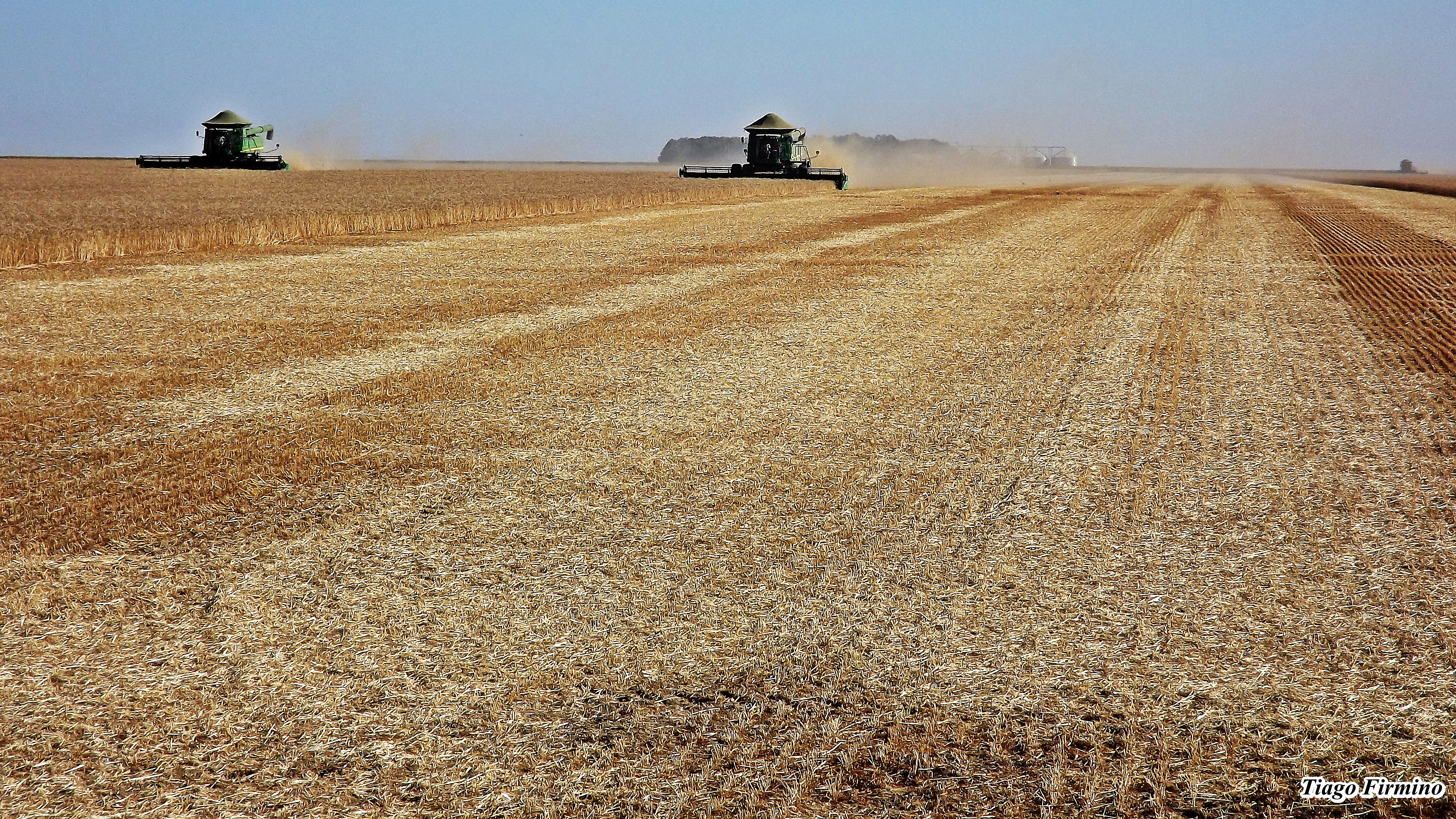
Wheat harvest in Goiás

Agriculture as a total represented 21% of the GDP of the state. The state of Goiás stands out in the production of sugarcane, corn, soy, sorghum, beans, sunflower, tomato, garlic, in addition to also producing cotton, rice, coffee and wheat. In 2019, Goiás was the Brazilian state with the 4th highest grain production, 10% of the national production. Goiás is the 2nd largest producer of sugarcane in the country, 11.3% of national production, with 75.7 million tons harvested in the 2019–20 harvest. In the same year, it was the 4th largest producer of soy, with 12.46 million tons. It has the national leadership in the production of sorghum: it produced 44% of the Brazilian crop production in the 2019–2020 cycle, with a harvest of 1.09 million tons. In 2017, it was the 4th largest producer of maize in the country. The state is also the Brazilian leader in tomato production: in 2019 it produced over 1.2 million tons, a third of the country's total production. In 2019, Goiás became the leader of the Brazilian production of garlic. Goiás was the 4th largest producer of beans in Brazil in the 2017–18 harvest, with 374 thousand tons, and has about 10% of the country's production. The state is also in 3rd place in the national production of cotton, however, most of the national production is from Mato Grosso and Bahia - Goiás has only 2.3% of participation. In sunflower, in 2020 Goiás was the 2nd largest national producer, with 41.8%, losing only from Mato Grosso. In rice, Goiás is the 8th largest producer in Brazil, with 1% of national production.

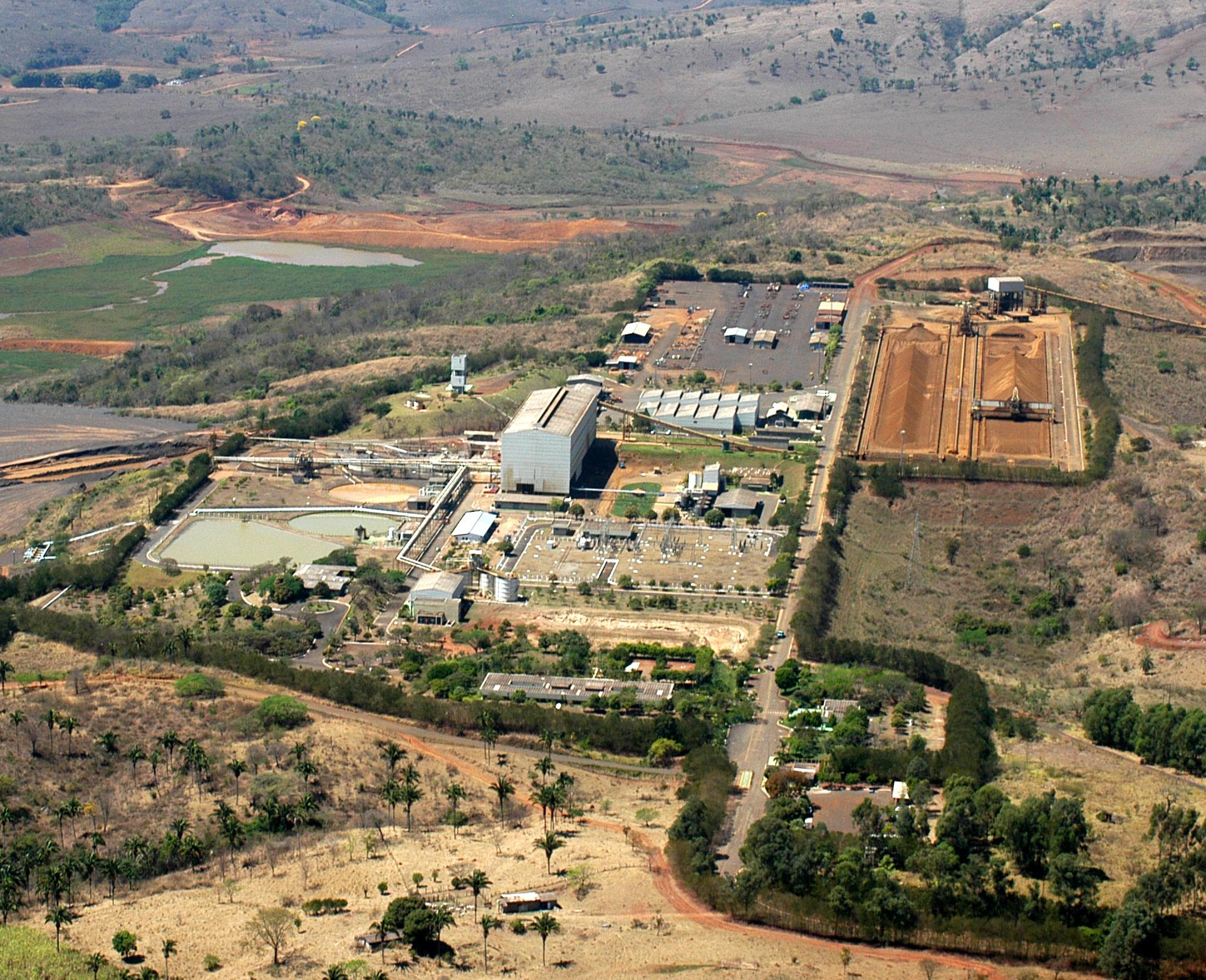
Chemical-mineral complex of the Fosfértil company in Catalão

Minerals are also important with the state being a major producer of nickel, copper, gold, niobium and aluminum (bauxite). Goiás had 4.58% of the national mineral participation (3rd place in the country) in 2017. At nickel, Goiás and Pará are the only two producers in the country, Goiás being the 1st in production, having obtained 154 thousand tons at a value of R$1.4 billion. In copper, it was the 2nd largest producer in the country, with 242 thousand tons, at a value of R$1.4 billion. In gold, it was the 4th largest producer in the country, with 10.2 tons, at a value of R$823 million. In niobium (in the form of pyrochlorine), it was the 2nd largest producer in the country, with 27 thousand tons, at a value of R$312 million. In aluminum (bauxite), it was the 3rd largest producer in the country, with 766 thousand tons, at a value of R$51 million.

In gemstones, Goiás is one of the emerald producing states in Brazil. Campos Verdes is considered the "Capital of the Emeralds". The state also has known production of tourmaline (Brazil is one of the biggest productors of this gem), and sapphire (in a scarce mode).

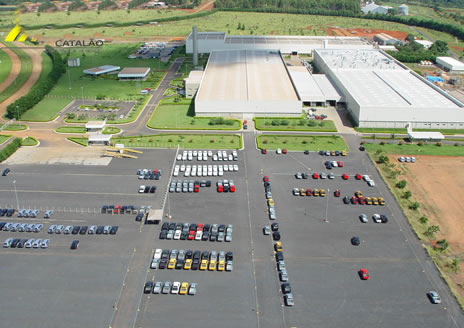
The Mitsubishi plant in Catalão

The strongest growing area in the state has been in industry and commerce. Goiás had in 2017 an industrial GDP of R$37.1 billion, equivalent to 3.1% of the national industry. It employs 302,952 workers in the industry. The main industrial sectors are: Construction (25.6%), Food (25.2%), Industrial Public Utility Services, such as Electricity and Water (17.2%), Petroleum Products and Biofuels (7.4%) and Chemicals (3.7%). These 5 sectors concentrate 79.1% of the state's industry.

Goiânia and Aparecida de Goiânia have become centers of food-processing industries, Anápolis of pharmaceutical factories. Rio Verde, in the southwest, is one of the fastest growing small cities with many new industries locating in the area and Catalão is a metal-mechanical and chemical center.

In Brazil, the automotive sector represents close to 22% of industrial GDP. Goiás has Mitsubishi, Suzuki and Hyundai factories.

=== Economic indicators ===
- Agriculture (in tons): sugarcane (9,251,798), soybeans (3,420,653), corn (3,414,601), tomato (759,009), rice (352,135), cotton (278,363), manioc (255,639), beans (200,977)--(1999).
- Livestock (in head): fowl (80,000,000 est.), cattle (18,000,000 est.), pigs (1,000,000 est.) --(1999).
- Minerals: titanium-ilmenite (1,624 t), nickel (52,302 t), manganese (23,242 t), cobalt (484 t), iron (199 brute tons), niobium-pirocloride (54,953 t), gold (4,512,882 grams), silver (211,917)--(1998).
- Industry: food, metallurgy, extraction of non-metallic minerals.

=== Statistics ===
- Vehicles: 1,610,972 (March/2007);
- Mobile phones: 3.6 million (April/2007); Telephones: 1.3 million (April/2007)
- Cities: 246 (2007).

== Infrastructure ==
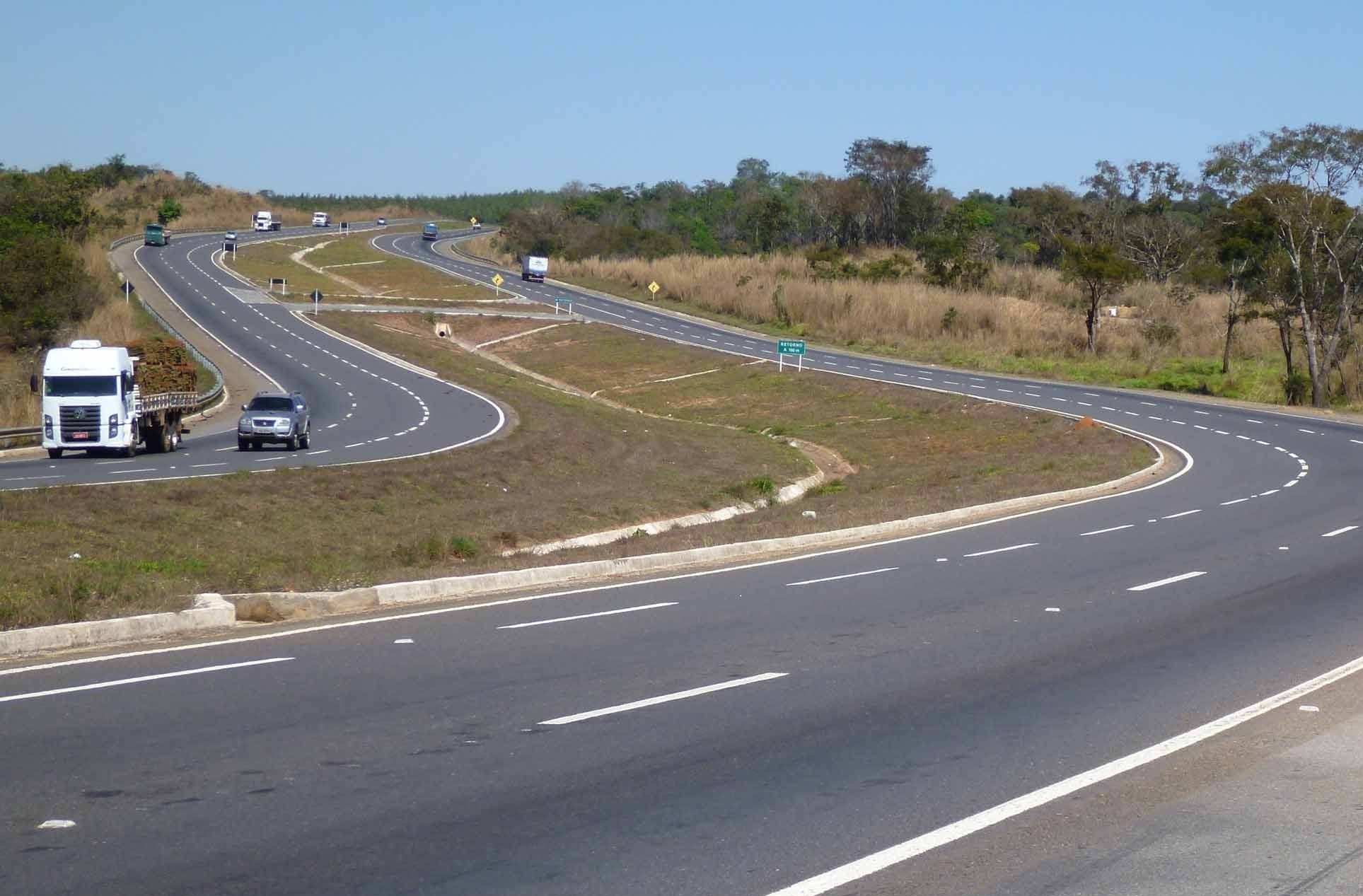
BR-060 Highway

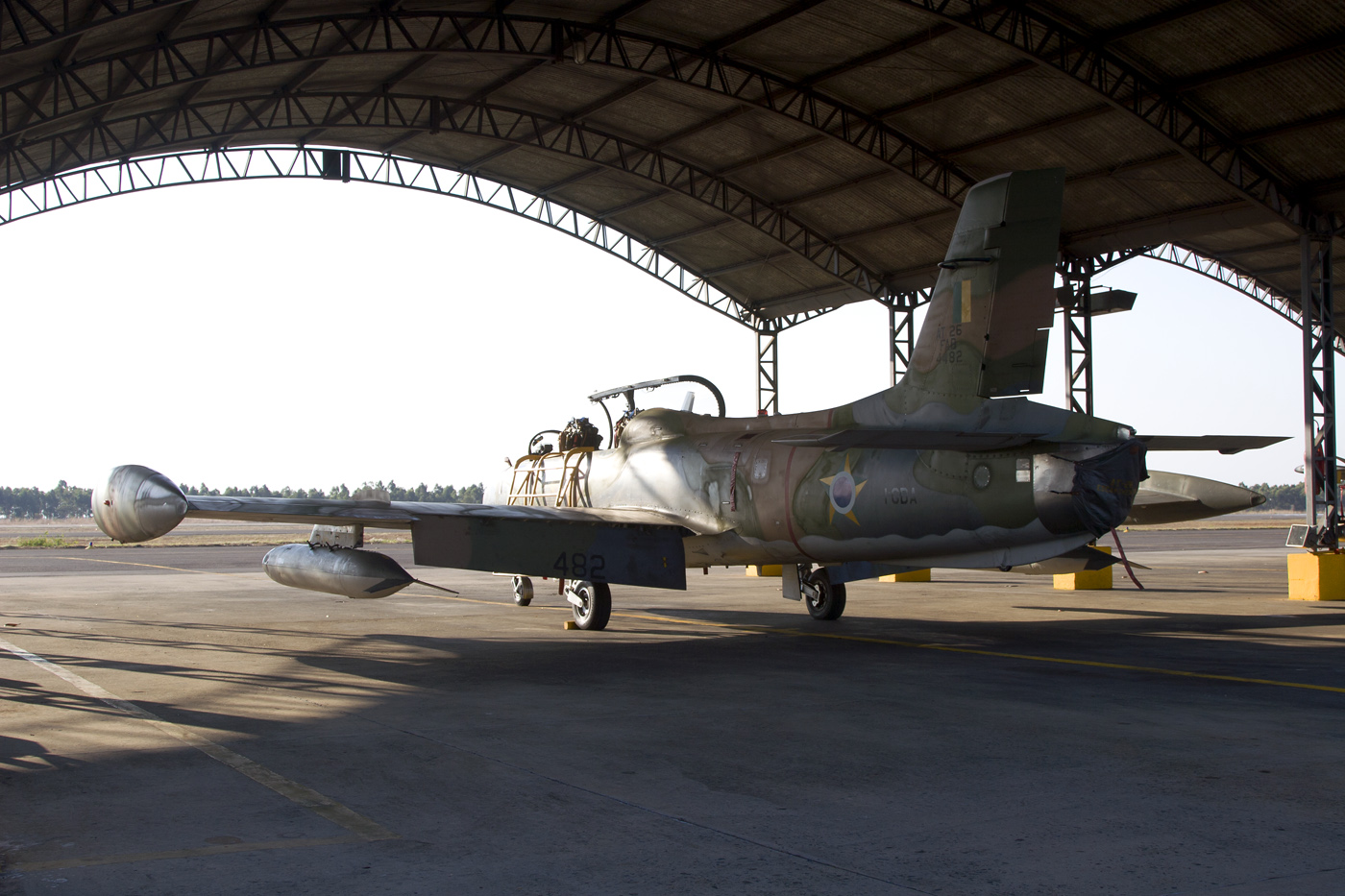
Anápolis Air Force Base

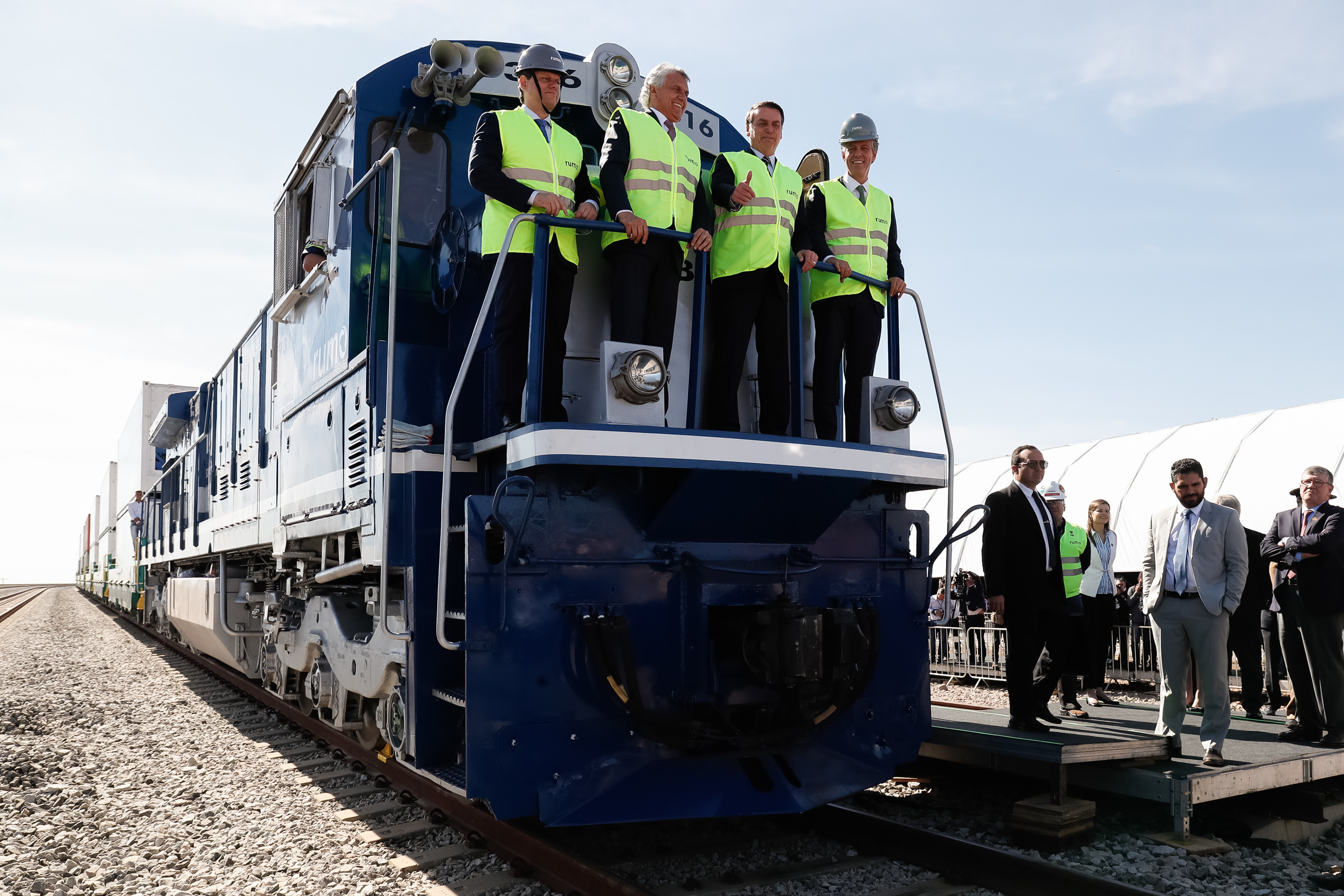
The President of the Republic, Jair Bolsonaro, poses for a photo during the signing ceremony of the concession contract for the north–south section, in 2019, in Anápolis.

In 2017, the state had a total road network of 96,642.1 km, including municipal, state and federal roads. As of December 2021, Goiás owned, in addition to municipal roads, 21,212.67 km of Goiás state roads and 2,094.3 km of federal roads. There are more than 13,000 km of paved roads and about 1,200 km are duplicated highways. The BR-060 has more than 520 km duplicated between Brasília, Goiânia and Jataí. The BR-050 is almost entirely duplicated in the state, with more than 200 km of highways between Cristalina and the border with Minas Gerais. The BR-153 between Goiânia and the border with Minas Gerais is also duplicated, in addition to the highways that connect Goiânia with the BR-070. Duplication of highways in the state began in the 2000s and has been constantly evolving ever since. There is currently a project to duplicate the BR-153 between Anápolis and the border with Tocantins.

Highways in the Brazilian Highway System include BR-020, BR-040, BR-050, BR-060, BR-070, BR-080, Rodovia Transbrasiliana (BR-153), BR-158, BR-251, BR-364, BR-414, BR-452; additionally, over 60 state highways run through the state.

Modernization work will soon get under way at Santa Genoveva Airport in the northeast side of Goiânia. With nominal yearly capacity of 600,000 passengers, in 2004 it received 950,000. With its new terminal, it will be able to handle up to 2 million users a year. Air traffic in Goiás has several airports. An airbase has been built in Anápolis for the supersonic aircraft of the Brazilian Air Force.

There is only a waterway on the Paranaíba River, and its main port is São Simão, which forms part of the Hidrovia Tietê-Paraná.

One of the most important railways in the state is the Ferrovia Norte-Sul (North-South Railway). On March 4, 2021, the section between São Simão (GO) and Estrela d'Oeste (SP) entered into operation. In São Simão, a terminal with a static capacity of 42,000 tons and the capacity to process 5.5 million tons of soybeans, corn and soybean meal per year was built. On May 29, 2021, the first railway composition loaded with soybeans departed from the multimodal terminal of Rio Verde (GO), bound for the Port of Santos. This trip marked the inauguration of the section between Rio Verde and São Simão (GO) with just over 200 km.

== Main sights ==
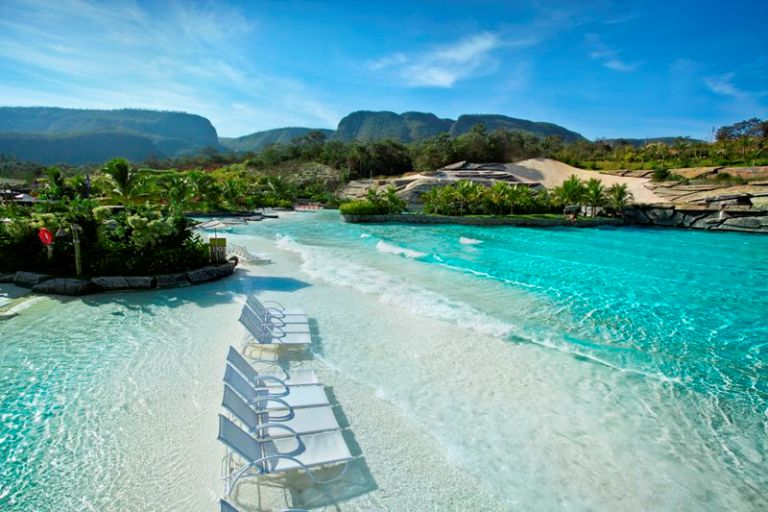
Wave pool, where thermal water is used, located in Rio Quente Resorts, Caldas Novas

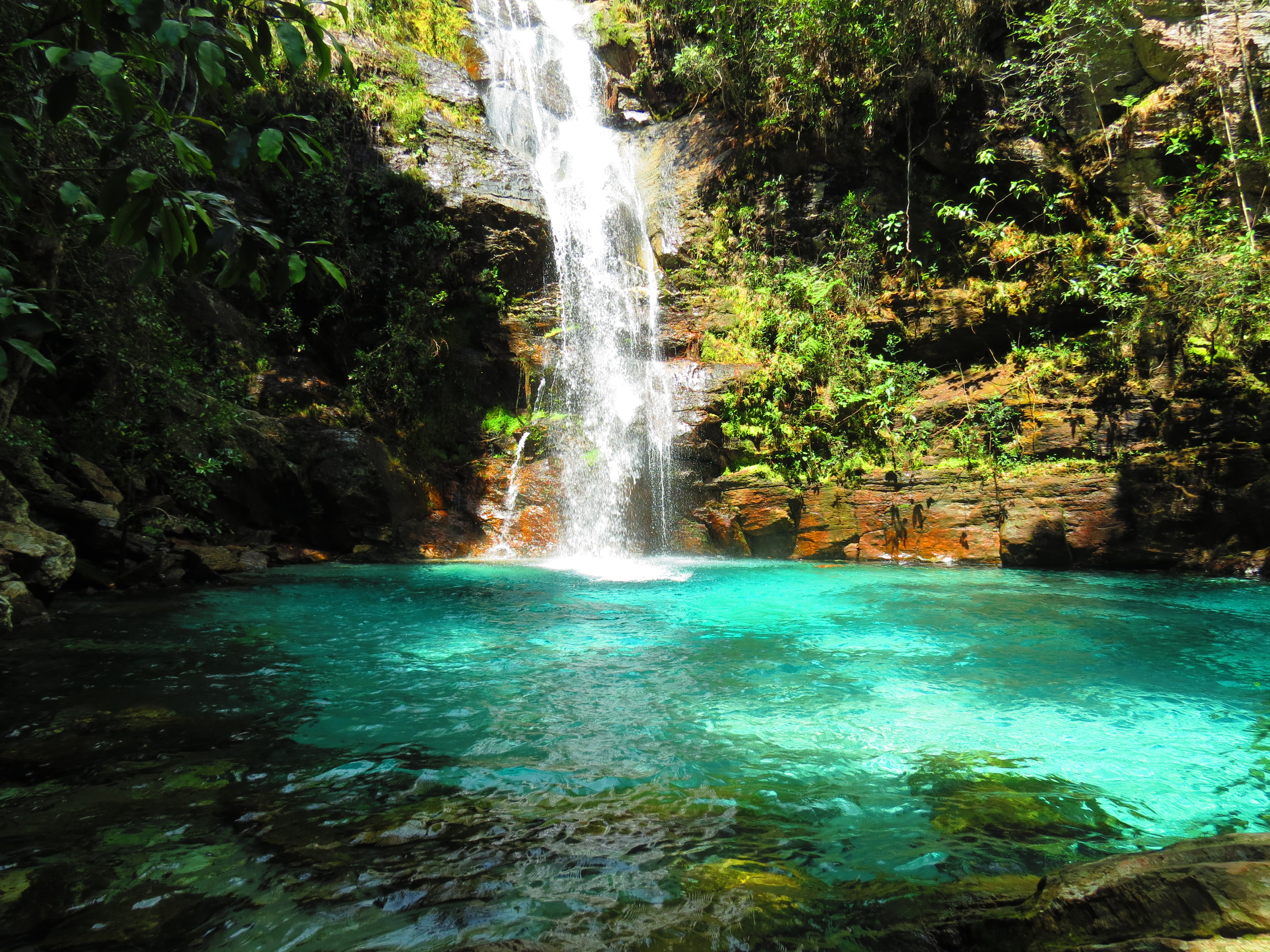
Santa Barbara Waterfall in Cavalcante

- Caldas Novas

It is a city located in the southeast of the state, where hot springs are located, being the largest hydrothermal resort in the world, with several resorts that use the waters of these thermal springs for therapeutic and leisure purposes. Some resorts in the city are inspired by the ancient Roman Baths. The Region attracts tourists from all over Brazil and the world.

- Chapada dos Veadeiros

It is an ecological national park famous for the diversity of its landscape and the richness of its fauna and flora.

- City of Goiás

An internationally famous World Heritage Site, the city is notable for its historical importance and colonial architecture.

- Parque Nacional das Emas

The Emas National Park is another World Heritage Site in Goiás.

- Pirenópolis

Pirenópolis is a city in the interior of the State of Goiás, known for its preserved colonial homes and steep stone streets.

== Cities ==
The state is divided into 246 municipalities

View of Catalão in Goiás

The 15 most populous cities as estimated in 2017 by IGBE:

- Goiânia (1,466,105)
- Aparecida de Goiânia (542,090)
- Anápolis (375,142)
- Rio Verde (217,048)
- Luziânia (199,615)
- Águas Lindas de Goiás (195,810)
- Valparaíso de Goiás (159,500)
- Trindade (121,266)
- Formosa (115,789)
- Novo Gama (110,096)
- Senador Canedo (105,459)
- Itumbiara (102,513)
- Catalão (102,393)
- Jataí (98,128)
- Santo Antônio do Descoberto (90,525)

See City population of Goiás for table showing population from 1991 to 2005 in the 37 largest cities.

Some cities known for their tourist interest

| Name | Population |
|---|---|
| Caldas Novas | 65,637 |
| Cristalina | 51,133 |
| Ipameri | 22,600 |
| Pirenópolis | 21,241 |
| Goiás | 14,173 |
| Paraúna | 10,900 |
| Corumbá de Goiás | 9,915 |
| Cavalcante | 9,725 |
| Alto Paraíso de Goiás | 7,688 |
| Aruanã | 5,212 |
| Rio Quente | 4,612 |

== Sport ==
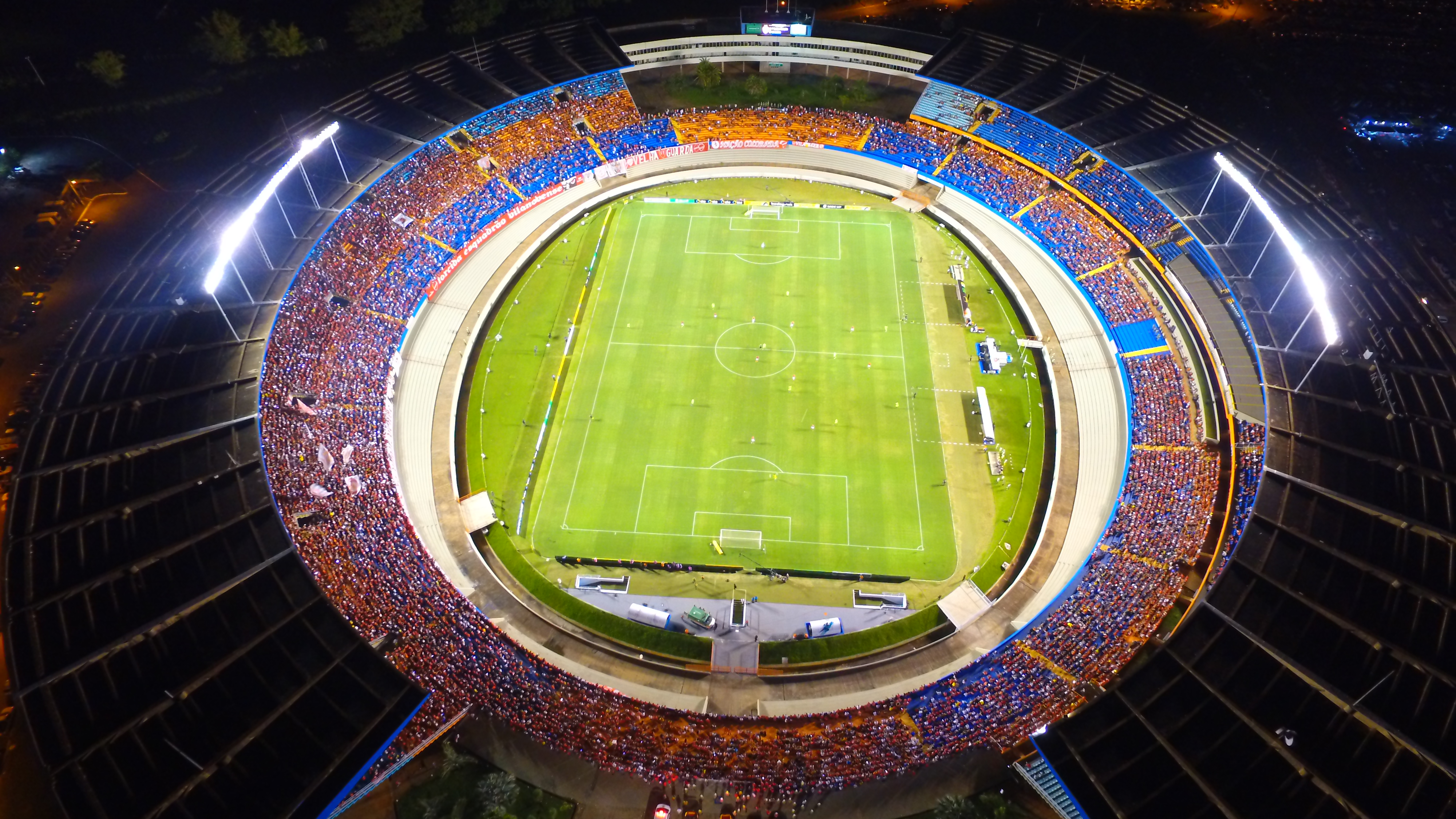
Serra Dourada Stadium

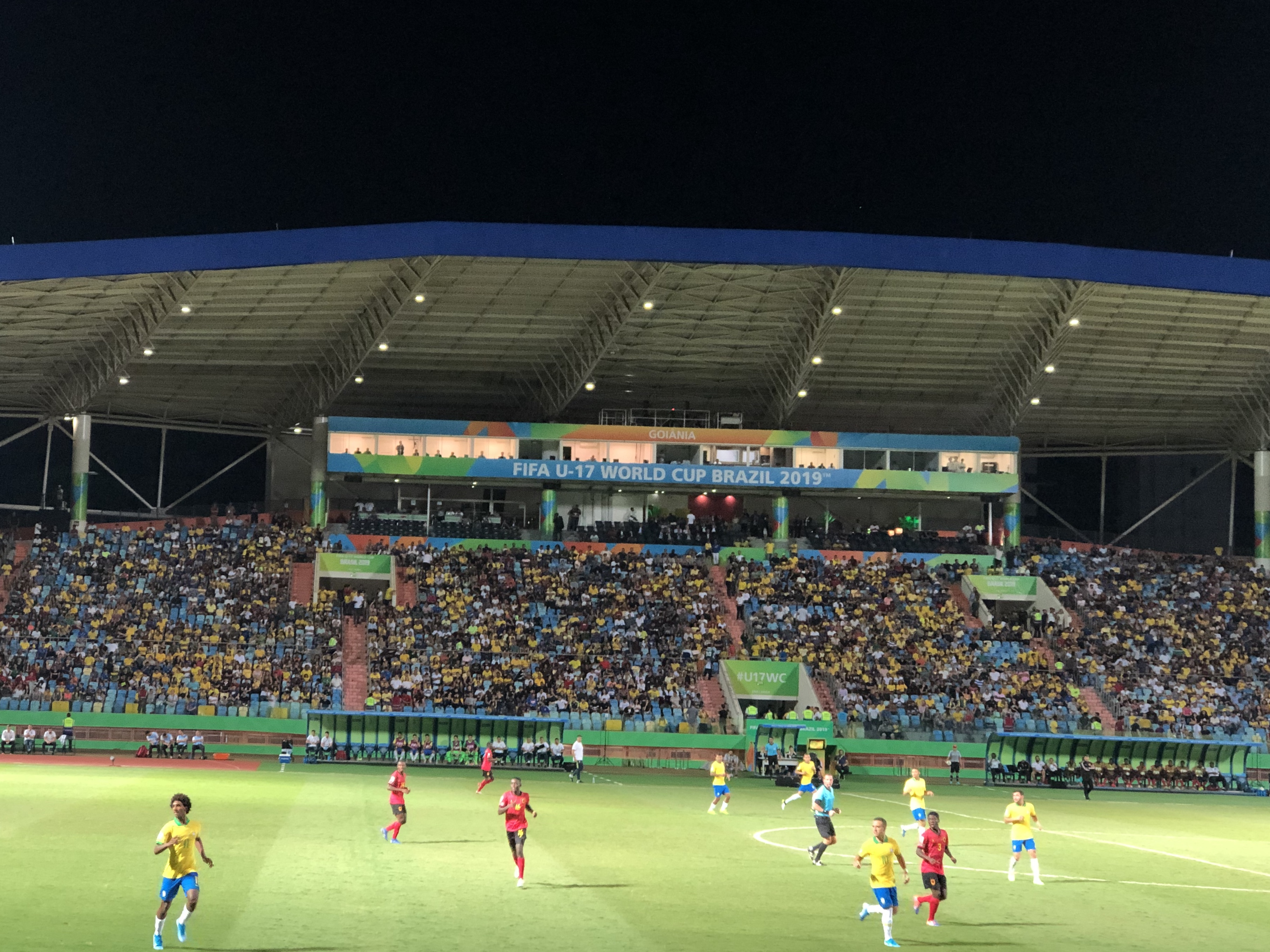
Pedro Ludovico Teixeira Olympic Stadium

The main sport in the state is football. The main football clubs are Goiás, Atlético Goianiense, Vila Nova, Anápolis, Itumbiara, Anapolina, CRAC and Goiânia. The main stadiums in Goiás are the Serra Dourada Stadium and the Pedro Ludovico Teixeira Olympic Stadium, which was chosen as one of the hosts of the 2019 FIFA U-17 World Cup.

Volleyball is also widely practiced by the population of Goiás, occupying the 3rd place in preference, with futsal in second place. Rugby occupies the fourth place in the preference of Goiás. A place where volleyball and futsal are widely practiced is in the city of Anápolis, which has an international gymnasium capable of hosting official matches, the Newton de Faria International Gymnasium.

Olympic medalists Dante in volleyball and Carlos Jayme in swimming were born in the state, as well as medalists in world championships, such as César Sebba in basketball and Diogo Villarinho in aquatic marathon.

== Flag ==
The green bars in the flag symbolize the spring and the yellow bars gold. The blue rectangle in the topleft corner symbolizes the sky, with the five stars forming the constellation of the Southern Cross. The flag was adopted on 30 July 1919. It is a toned down version of the original Republican flag of Brazil, in itself not original.

== Notable people ==
- Joaquim Xavier Curado, Count of São João das Duas Barras, military officer, nobleman and politician
- Carlos Jayme, swimmer, Olympic medallist
- Amado Batista, singer
- Arthur, footballer
- Douglas Lima, MMA champion
- Diogo Villarinho, swimmer specialized in open water marathon
- Henrique Meirelles, president of Banco Central do Brasil
- Mahau Suguimati, athlete
- Leandro e Leonardo, singers
- Léo Jaime, singer and songwriter
- Bruno Bonfim, swimmer
- Marcos Hummel, Rede Record presenter
- Nana Gouvêa, adult model
- Dudu, football player
- Ronaldo Caiado, governor
- Fernandão, football player, world champion playing for Sport Club Internacional
- Túlio Maravilha, former soccer player
- Wanessa, singer
- Zezé Di Camargo & Luciano, singers
- Paulo Nunes, former soccer player
- Dante Amaral, Brazilian national volleyball team

== See also ==
- Goiânia accident
- Government of Goiás
