= Luziânia =

Luziânia, Goiás Municipality of Luziânia
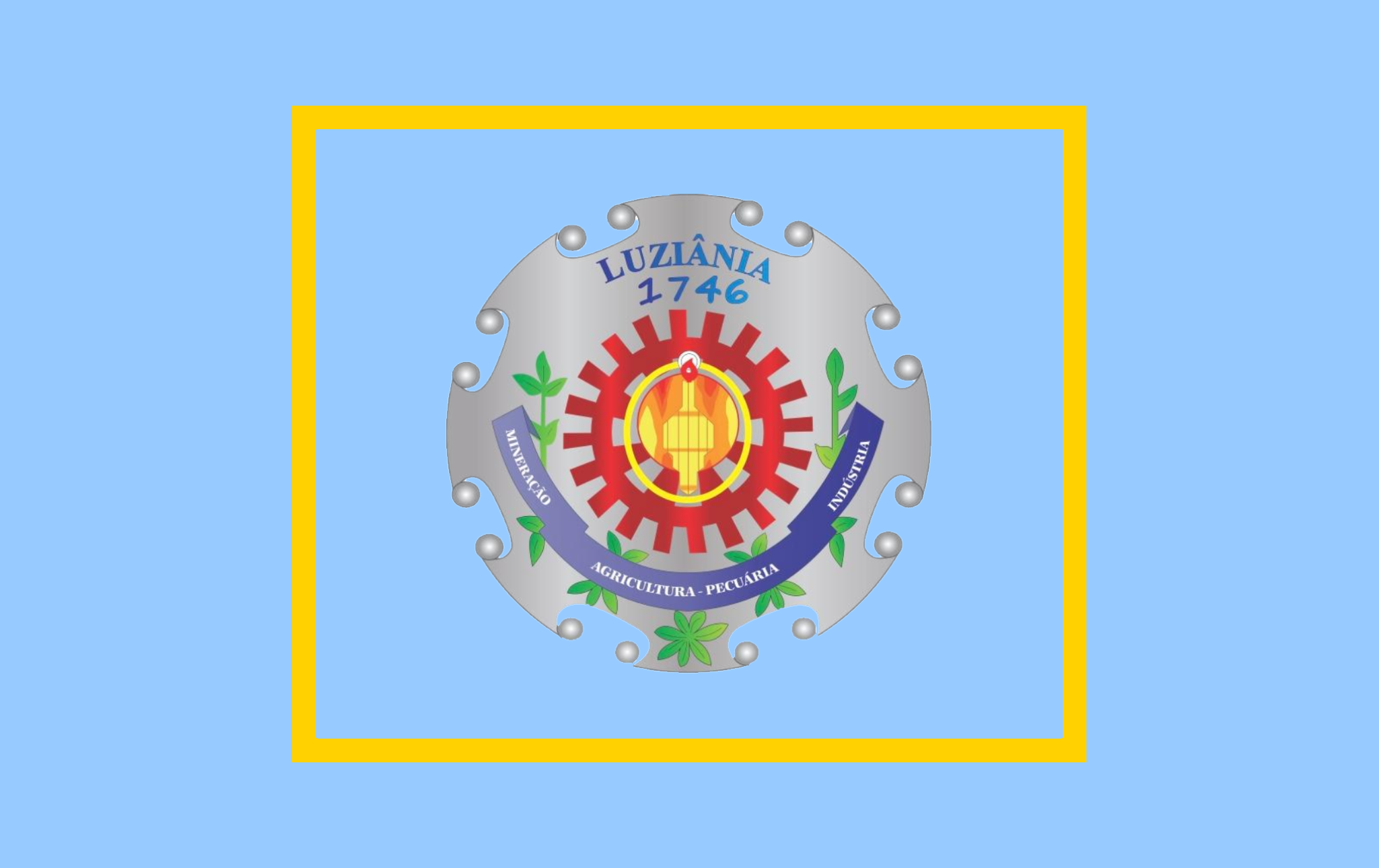
- Flag Coat of arms

- Location in the state of Goiás and Brazil

- Location in Brazil
- Coordinates: 16°15′10″S 47°57′00″W
- Country: Brazil
- Region: Central-West
- State: Goiás
- Founded: December 13, 1746

Government
  - Mayor: Diego Sorgatto (UNIÃO)

Area
  - Total: 3,961.536 km^{2} (1,529.558 sq mi)
- Elevation: 930 m (3,050 ft)

Population (2022 Brazilian census)
  - Total: 209,129
  - Estimate (2025): 221,262
  - Density: 52.7899/km^{2} (136.725/sq mi)
- Demonym: luzianiense
- Time zone: UTC−3 (BRT)
- Postal code: 72800-000
- Website: www.luziania.go.gov.br

Luziânia is a municipality in the state of Goiás, Brazil. This city is a producer of agricultural products, including soybeans and beans.

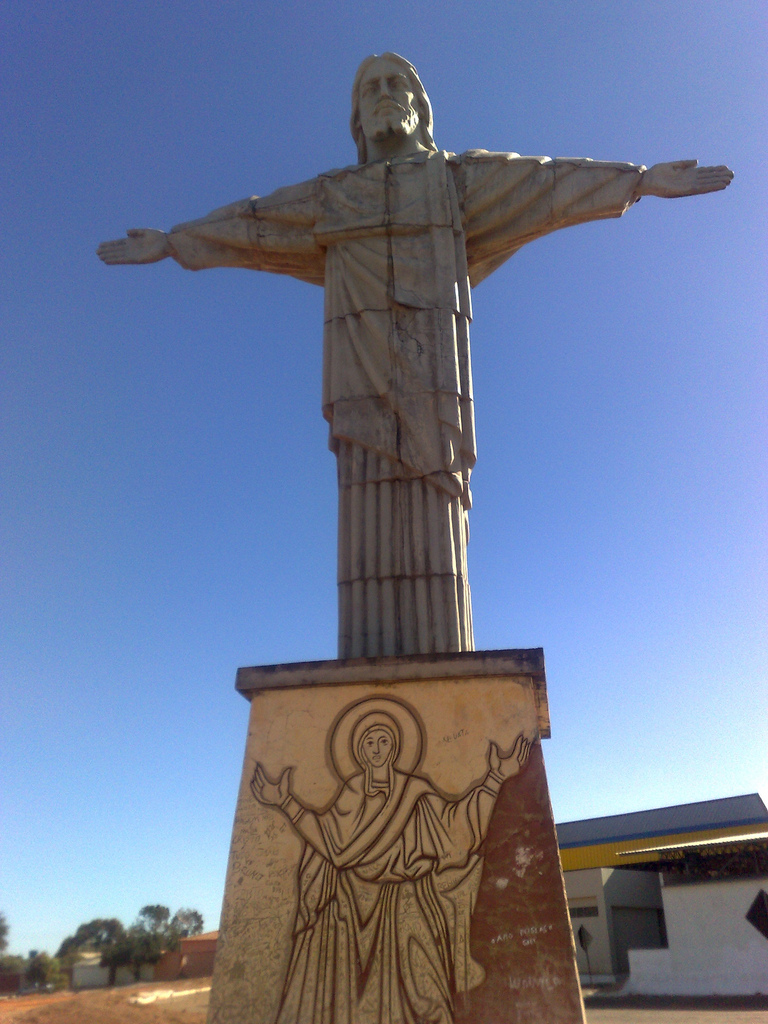
A statue of Jesus Christ in Luziânia.

== Geography ==
=== Location ===
Luziânia is located 68km south of Brasília and is part of the area, called Entorno do Distrito Federal.

Although the city has existed as a settlement since colonial days, its rapid growth occurred in the eighties and nineties with the population explosion of the federal capital and the need for less expensive living areas outside the planned city.

The municipality is limited in the north by Valparaíso de Goiás and Novo Gama; in the south by Orizona and Ipameri; in the west by Santo Antônio do Descoberto, Alexânia, and Silvânia; and in the east by Cristalina.

== Demographics ==
In 2007 population density was 49.49 inhabitants/km^{2}. The population has almost doubled since 1980, when it was 92,817. Today it is over 190,000 with fewer than 20,000 living in the rural area. (IBGE/Sepin)

In 1996 the population had grown to 246,000, but then the city lost much of its territory and population due to the formation of new municipalities like Valparaíso de Goiás and Cidade Ocidental. Since 1996 the population has continued to grow, showing an increase of 4.81% from 2000 to 2007. (IBGE/Sepin)

== Economy ==
Until the 1980s, Luziânia was a sleepy little agricultural town a half hour's drive away from Brasília. Then agribusiness discovered the relatively flat lands that could produce high yields of soybeans with central pivot irrigation. Today, the city is one of the most prosperous in the state, the second largest producer of beans and potatoes in the state, and the third largest producer of cotton and corn. In fruit cultivation, it is the first producer in the state of guava and the fourth of tomatoes and passion fruit (maracujá). The planted area of the main crops in 2006 was: cotton, 1,334 hectares; rice, 1,000 hectares; beans, 24,000 hectares; corn, 15,000 hectares; and soybeans, 40,000 hectares.

The economy is also strong in cattle raising (187,000 head in 2006), both for meat and dairy, as well as semi-precious stones, gravel, bricks, and a well-known sweet made from quince. Due to the proximity to Brasília there is extensive production of fruits and garden vegetables. The poultry industry is highly developed with 1,227,000 birds in 2006.

In a study made by the Secretaria do Planejamento e Desenvolvimento (Seplan) Luziânia was ranked in seventh place in the state in competitiveness.

Agricultural data 2006

- Farms: 1,767
- Total area: 216,990 ha.
- Area of permanent crops: 10,019 ha.
- Area of perennial crops: 39,146 ha.
- Area of natural pasture: 112,084 ha.
- Area of woodland and forests: 51,021 ha.
- Persons dependent on farming: 6,100
- Number of tractors: 440
- Cattle herd: 187,000

Products in 2005
Product	Area (km^{2})
Beans	140
Coffee	3.2
Corn	110
Cotton	5
Guava	1.3
Rice	12
Sorghum	6
Soybeans	500
Wheat	12

The municipality is rich in gold, rock crystals and hardwoods like jatobá, aroeira, peroba, and angico are still found in the fast disappearing forests, now existing mainly on the river banks.

The Corumbá River passes west of the city and receives its untreated sewage, seriously polluting the river waters.

== Health and education ==
In 2006 the city had two hospitals with 106 beds and 35 walk-in clinics. The infant mortality rate was 21.11 in 2000, well below the state and national average.

The school system had 108 schools in 2007, with 51,799 students and 1,603 teachers. In July 2007 there were two institutions of higher learning: a private school—Faculdades Integradas do Planalto Central-FIPLAC; and a campus of the state university—Unidade Universitária da UEG. The literacy rate was 89.2% in 2000.

- MHDI: 0.756
- State ranking: 65 (out of 242 municipalities)
- National ranking: 1,706 (out of 5,507 municipalities)

(All data are from 2000.)

== Transportation ==
The city is served by Brig. Araripe Macedo Airport.

== See also ==
- List of municipalities in Goiás
