= Cristalina =

Cristalina, Goias
- Municipality
- Municipality of Cristalina
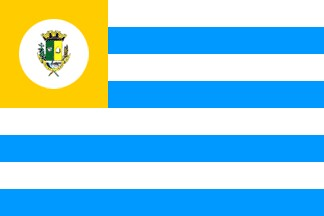
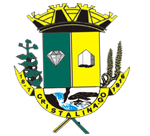
- Flag Coat of arms
- Nickname: Terra dos Cristais (Land of Cristals)
- Location of Cristalina in the State of Goiás

- Location in Brazil
- Coordinates: 16°46′08″S 47°36′56″W
- Country: Brazil
- Region: Central-West
- State: Goiás
- Established: July 18, 1916

Government
  - Mayor: Daniel Sabino Vaz (2020-atual) (MDB)

Area
  - Total: 6,160.72 km^{2} (2,378.67 sq mi)
- Elevation (AMSL): 1,189 m (3,901 ft)

Population (2020)
  - Total: 60,210
  - Density: 7.87/km^{2} (20.4/sq mi)
- Time zone: UTC−3 (BRT)
- Postal code: 73850-000
- Area code: +55 (Brazil) 61 (Region)
- Website: Prefeitura Municipal de Cristalina

Cristalina is a municipality located in the southeast of the state of Goiás, Brazil.

== Location ==
Cristalina is located directly south of the federal capital, Brasília, and is connected to that city by BR-040. It lies on a plateau between the basins of two rivers: the Corumbá River and the São Marcos. Cristalina is 274 kilometers from Goiânia and 125 kilometers from Brasília. Cristalina belongs to the micro-region called Entorno do Distrito Federal, which consists of several cities in Goiás state located outside the boundaries of the Federal District.

Cristalina has municipal boundaries with:

- North: Federal District
- South: Ipameri
- East: Mundo Novo
- West: Luziânia and Cidade Ocidental

Cristalina is located at the junction of two important highways—the BR 040, which links Brasília to Belo Horizonte, and the BR 050, which links Brasília to São Paulo. This location alone has been responsible for much of the growth of the city, which had an increase in population with the foundation and continuous growth of Brasília, which is located at a distance of 125 km.

As the name indicates the town is famous for being one of the largest centers of production and commerce of precious and semi-precious stones and crystals in Brazil. The immense variety of stones (such as amethysts, sapphires, emeralds, blue topazes, and tourmaline) and of crystals (found in diverse sizes, shapes and colors) are responsible for the large number of tourists that visit the city. Because of the altitude the climate is mild, with temperatures between 10 and 28 degrees Celsius.

== Economy ==
Today Cristalina is known for its large production of grains, especially seeds. It produces soybeans (140,000 hectares), corn (21,000 hectares), beans (34,000 hectares), sorghum (5,000 hectares), and rice (3,000 hectares). The cattle herd is large with 125,000 head in 2006. In 2007 there were 03 financial institutions (Banco do Brasil S.A, BRADESCO S.A., and Banco Itaú S.A.) and 01 meat-packing house—Cooperativa Agrícola Três Barras Ltda. (22/05/2006)

Agricultural data 2006

- Farms: 1,136
- Total area: 330,663 ha.
- Area of permanent crops: 7,837 ha.
- Area of perennial crops: 143,532 ha.
- Area of natural pasture: 101,157 ha.
- Area of woodland and forests: 72,679 ha.
- Persons dependent on farming: 4,800
- Number of tractors: 967
- Cattle herd: 125,000

Cristalina was the state's largest producer of garlic, coffee, onions, peas, beans, tomatoes, and wheat.

== Health and education ==
- Literacy rate in 2000: 82.3
- Infant mortality rate in 2000: 16.88 in 1,000 live births
- Schools: 36 with 13,555 students
- Hospitals: 02 with 30 beds
- Higher education was represented by two schools: Faculdade Central de Cristalina and Pólo Universitário da UEG.
- MHDI (2000): 0.760
- State ranking: 53 (out of 242 municipalities in 2000)
- National ranking: 1.571 (out of 5,507 municipalities in 2000)

== History ==
The history of Cristalina began in the eighteenth century with gold exploration. An abundance of rock crystal and in 1879 two Frenchmen, Etienne Lopes and Leon Laboissière, residents of Paracatu, bought some of the crystal and exported it to Paris. They then settled in a place called Serra Velha where they set up their operations. Later, after the failure of the first miners, another Frenchman, Emílio Levy, arrived trading cloth for crystal and built his house, stimulating others to arrive. In 1901 the district of Serra dos Cristais was created belonging to the municipality of Santa Luzia, now Luziânia. In 1916 it was emancipated as São Sebastião dos Cristais, later changed to Cristalina.

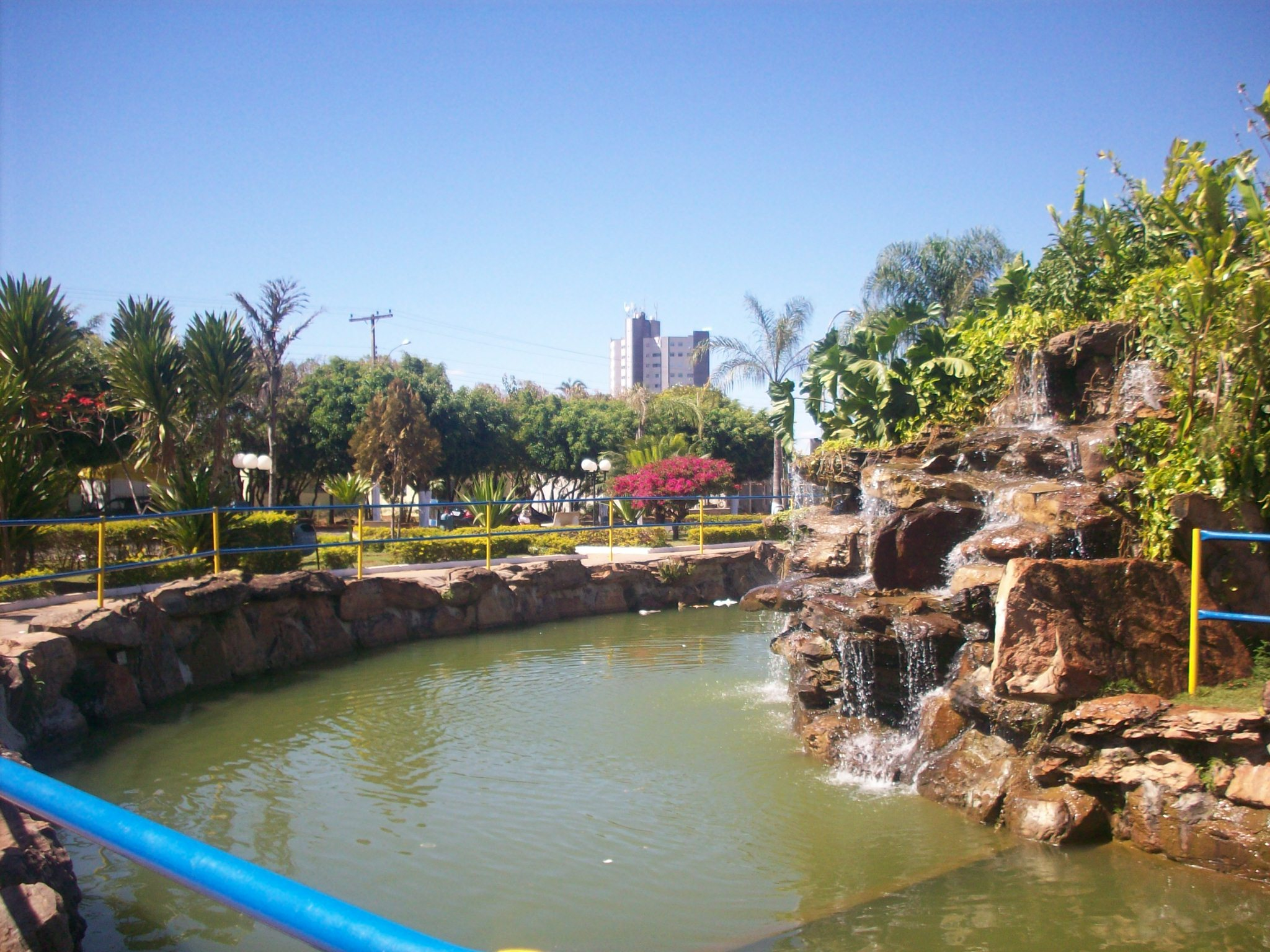
Otto Monh Garden in Lake Cachoeira

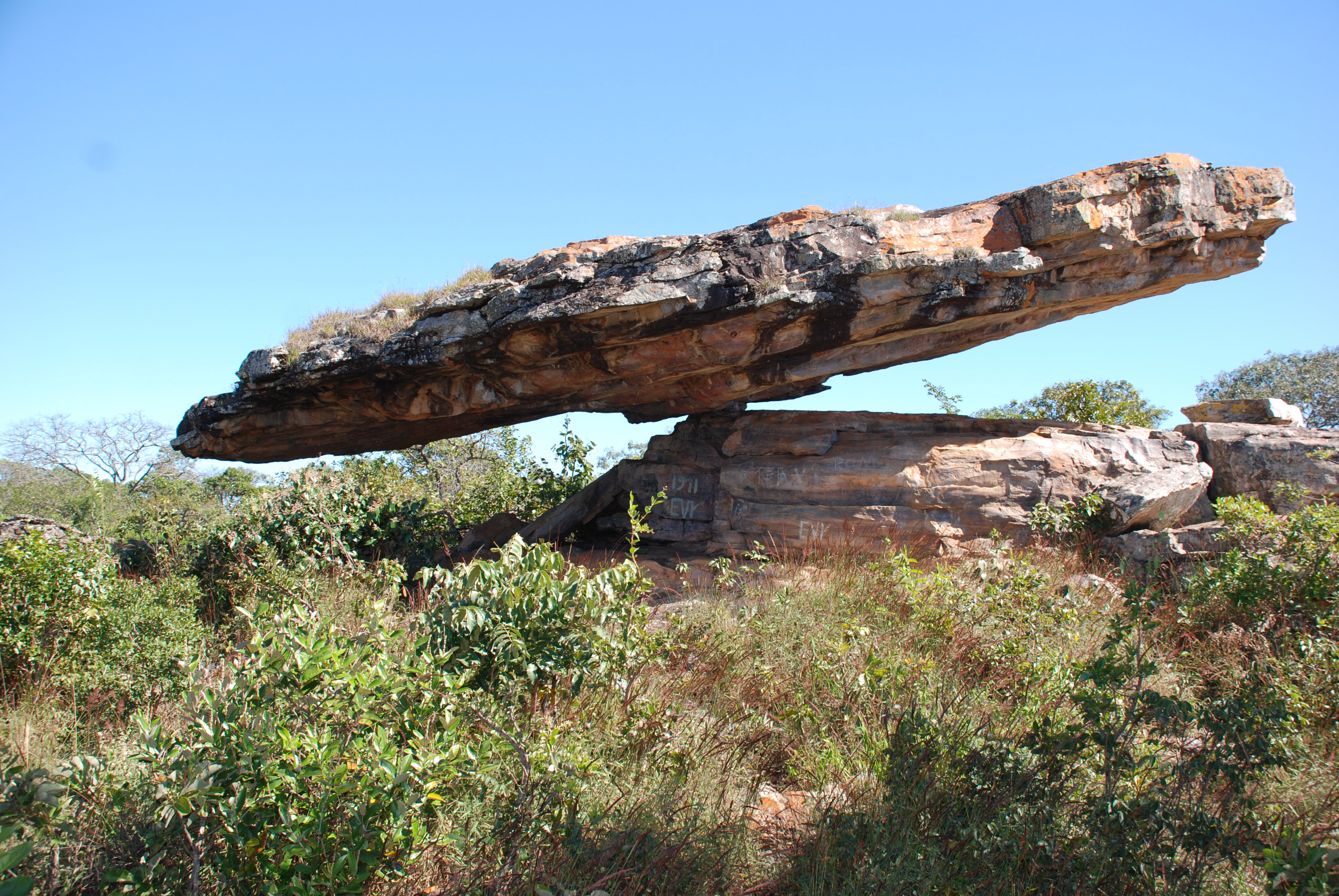
Pedra Chapéu do Sol (Rock Sun Hat), about five miles from downtown Cristalina

== See also ==
- List of municipalities in Goiás
