= BR-070 (Brazil highway) =

Highway in Brazil

BR-070

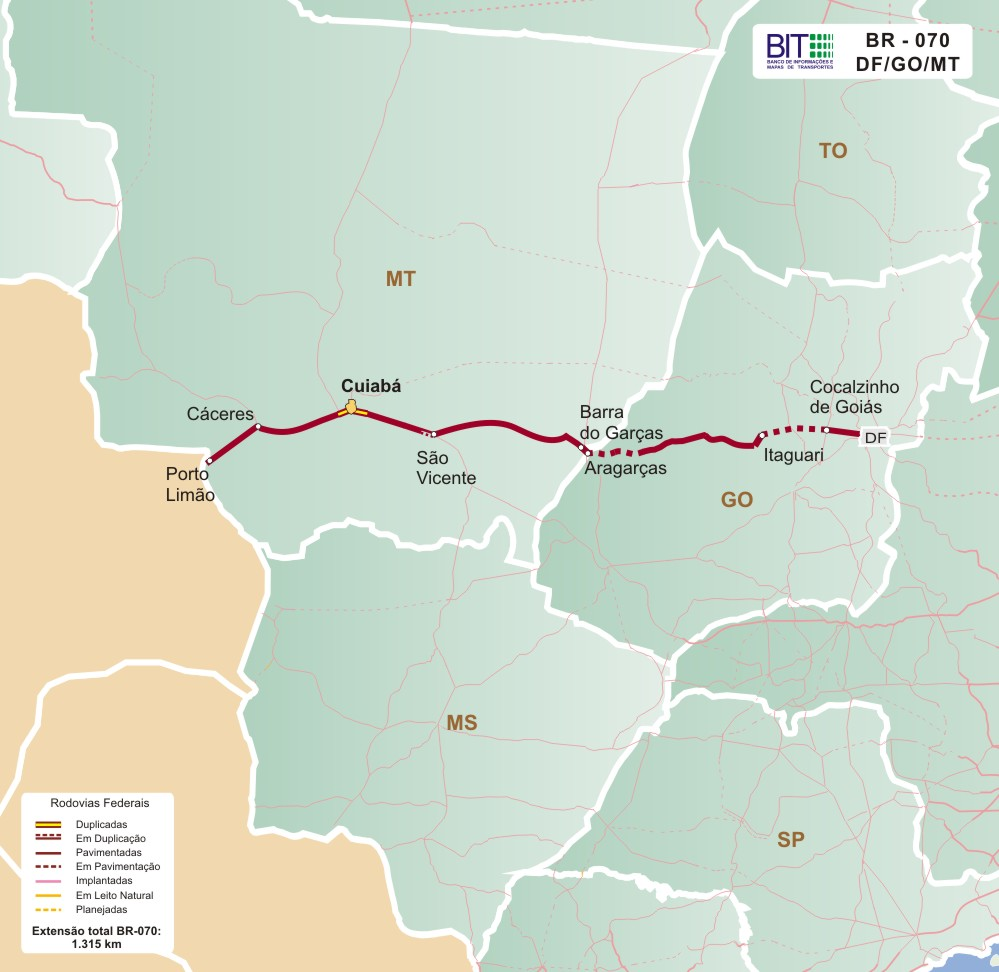

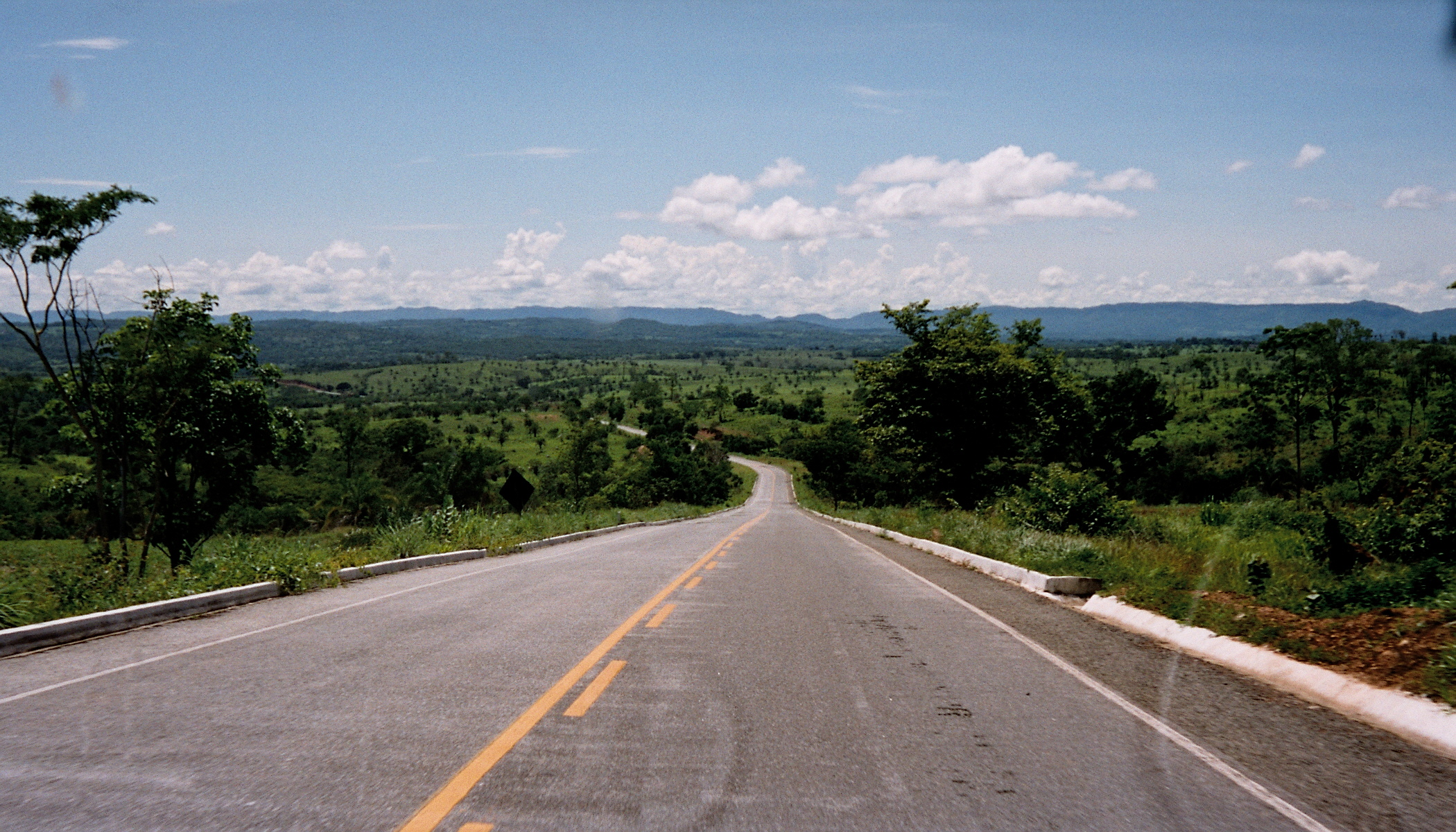
- BR-070 between Jussara and Goiás Velho

Route information
- Length: 1,317.7 km (818.8 mi)

Major junctions
- East end: Brasília, Federal District
- West end: Cáceres, Mato Grosso

Location
- Country: Brazil

Highway system
- Highways in Brazil; Federal

BR-070 is a federal highway of Brazil. The 1,315 kilometres (817 mi) road connects Brasília to Porto Corixó, Cáceres, Mato Grosso.

== Duplication ==
BR-070 is duplicated in the 52 km between Brasília and Águas Lindas de Goiás.

At the end of 2018, the duplication of the GO-070 motorway was completed, in the section between Goiânia and the city of Goiás, which totaled approximately 150 kilometers. The section between the cities of Itaberaí and Goiás is on BR-070.
