= Valparaíso de Goiás =

- Municipality
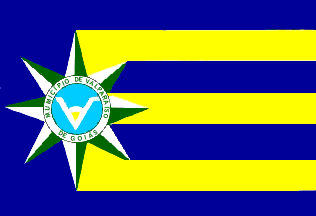
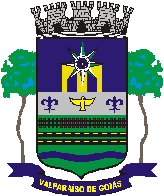
- Flag Coat of arms

- Location in Goiás state

- Location in Brazil
- Coordinates: 16°04′07″S 47°58′35″W
- Country: Brazil
- Region: Central-West
- State: Goiás
- Microregion: Entorno do Distrito Federal

Area
  - Total: 60.950 km^{2} (23.533 sq mi)
- Elevation: 1,080 m (3,540 ft)

Population (2022 Brazilian Census)
  - Total: 198,861
  - Estimate (2025): 218,416
  - Density: 3,262.7/km^{2} (8,450.3/sq mi)
- Time zone: UTC−3 (BRT)
- Postal code: 72870-000

Valparaíso de Goiás is a municipality in east-central Goiás state, Brazil.

== Geography ==
=== Location ===
Valparaíso is located on the plateau known as Planalto Central, southwest of Brasília and is part of the area known as the Entorno do Distrito Federal. The distance to the state capital, Goiânia, is 188 km and the estimated time of travel is 2:22 hours.

It has boundaries with:

- North: Federal District
- South: Luziânia
- East: Cidade Ocidental
- West: Novo Gama

It is served by highways BR-040, BR-060, BR-020 BR-251, and DF-290. The distance to the state capital of Goiânia is 191 km and to Brasília, 25 km Highway connections with Goiânia are made by BR-153 / Anápolis / BR-060 / Alexânia / Gama. For the complete list see Distâncias Rodoviárias

== Demography ==
It is considered one of the most densely populated municipalities in the state. All of the inhabitants live in the urban area since there is no rural area. The population has grown by over 25,000 inhabitants since the first census in 2000.

== Economy ==
Commerce, small industries and service-providing enterprises are the base of the economy. The potential for development, with its stands of trees, water sources, abundant energy and strategic location make it an attractive city for investment. The city is cut by highway BR 040, with a daily traffic of approximately 50,000 vehicles, in addition to the railway line, and this is attracting companies specializing in cargo transport.

Where the less privileged economic sectors could afford housing, it is still very dependent on the informal economy, which represents 40% of the base, with civil construction representing 30%, and the rest made up of workers commuting to Brasília. In recent years Valparaíso has been attracting furniture industries and the city has implanted a center (polo) for 120 new furniture factories. At the date of this writing there were approximately 100 furniture stores in the city operated by micro businessmen, with 500 carpenters registered in the area.

== Health and education ==
In 2007 there were no hospitals. The infant mortality rate was 18.98, well below the national average of 33.0. There were 3 institutions of higher learning. In 2000 the adult literacy rate was 93.1%, one of the highest in the state and well above the national average of 86.4%.

- MHDI: 0.795 (2000)
- State ranking: 12 (out of 242 municipalities)
- National ranking: 679 (out of 5,507 municipalities)

== History ==
The history of the city is very recent, appearing in 1979 as a housing development with precarious services. The name is a tribute to a civil engineer who was from Valparaíso, Chile, and had come to Brazil to be in charge of the first housing project of the future city. There are two neighborhoods whose names are written with the letter "z" – Valparaízo I e II –, according to the Chilean city. But, according to Portuguese spelling, the name of the city began to be written with the letter "s".

== See also ==
- List of municipalities in Goiás
- Microregions of Goiás
