= Cidade Ocidental =

- Municipality
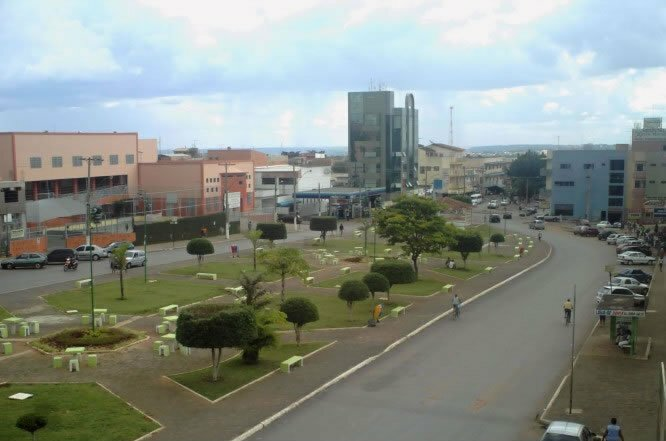

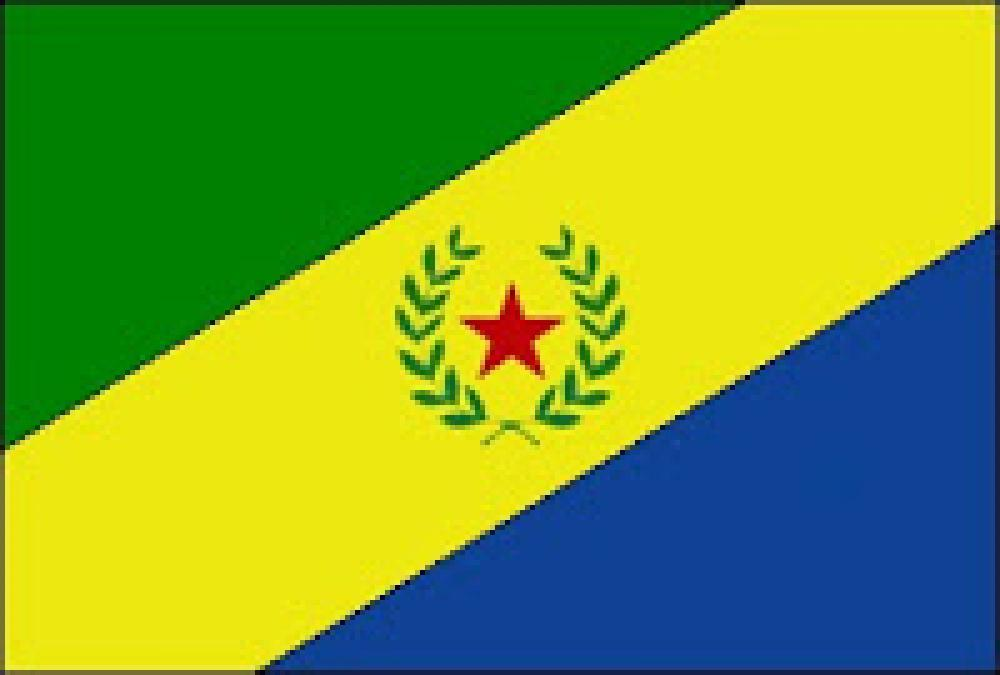
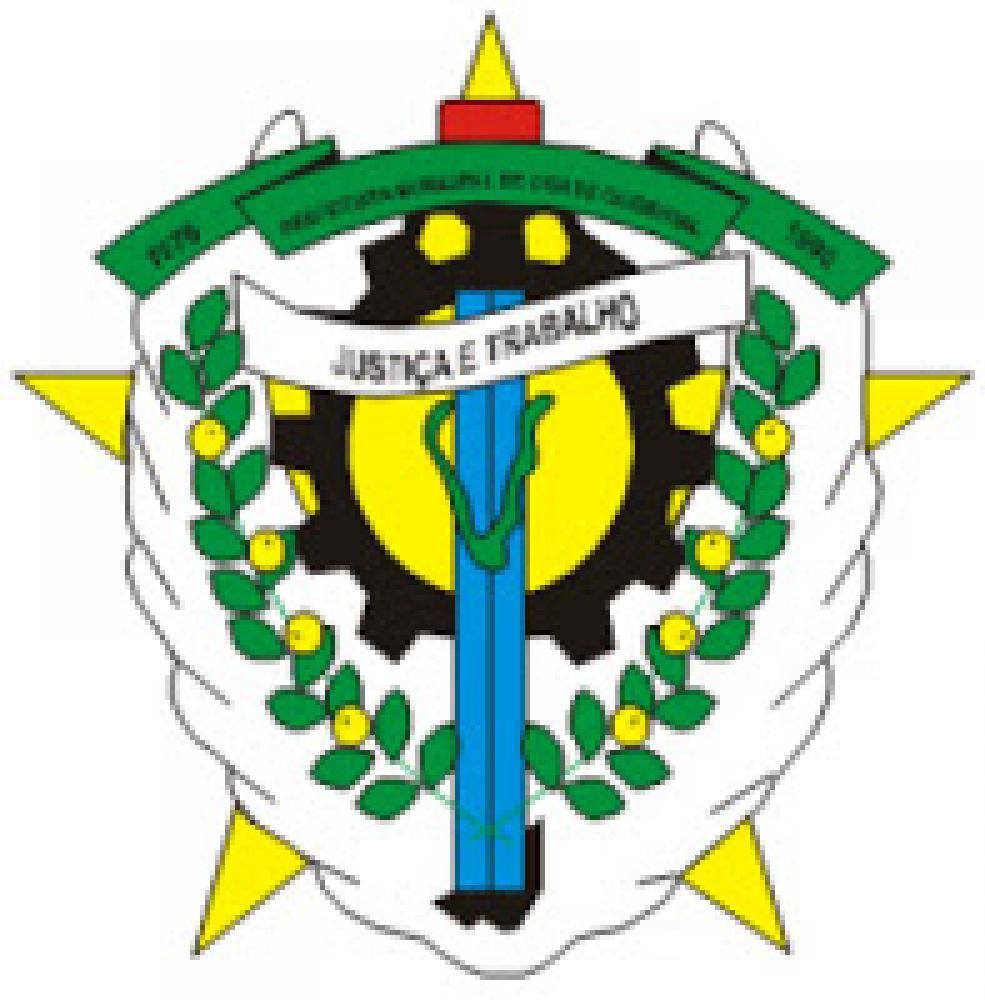
- Flag Coat of arms

- Location in Goiás state

- Location in Brazil
- Coordinates: 16°06′36″S 47°56′37″W
- Country: Brazil
- Region: Central-West
- State: Goiás

Area
  - Total: 389.8 km^{2} (150.5 sq mi)
- Elevation: 952 m (3,123 ft)

Population (2025)
  - Total: 101,570
  - Density: 260.6/km^{2} (674.9/sq mi)
  - City/Urban Place: 100,570
- Time zone: UTC−3 (BRT)
- Postal code: 72880-000
- Website: www.cidadeocidental.net.br

Cidade Ocidental is a municipality located in central Goiás state, Brazil.

== Geography ==
It is bordered on the north by the Federal District, on the south by Luziânia, on the east by Cristalina and Luziânia, and on the west by Luziânia and Valparaíso de Goiás.

The municipality has a tropical with altitude climate with temperature variations between 18 °C and 28 °C. The vegetation is typical of the cerrado with short and twisted trees, with some pockets of tropical tree growth. The main rivers are the São Bartolomeu, Saia Velha and Mesquita.

== Characterization ==
Cidade Ocidental is the case of a community formed by the need to give inexpensive housing to the lower and lower-middle sectors in the Federal District. With no more housing available inside the District new communities have sprung up in neighboring Goiás. The city, with poor infrastructure and serious budgetary problems, makes up an urban sprawl extending for more than 40 km. from Luziânia to the limit of the Federal District, where rules for construction are more rigid. A neighboring city created under the same conditions is Valparaíso de Goiás.

== Economy ==
Livestock processing, services, small industries, government employment and modest agriculture are the main sources of income for the municipality. The presence of packing houses and slaughter houses has created a good number of direct and indirect jobs. In the agricultural sector there was modest production of rice, coffee, sugarcane, beans, oranges, lemons, manioc and tangerines.

Agricultural data 2006

- Farms: 257
- Total area: 24,359 ha.
- Area of permanent crops: 489 ha.
- Area of perennial crops: 3,090 ha.
- Area of pasture: 13,587 ha.
- Area of woodland and forests: 6,235 ha.
- Cattle herd: 12,423

== Health and education ==
- Literacy rate in 2000: 93.9% (higher than the state average)
- Schools: 74 (2006)
- Students: 43,150 (2006)
- Higher education: A private institute called Faculdade Brasil Central - FBC; campus of the Universidade Estadual de Goiás - UEG.
- Infant mortality rate in 2000: 18.49 in 1,000 live births
- Hospitals: 01 with 68 beds (2007)
- MHDI (2000): 0.795
- State ranking: 11 (out of 242 municipalities)
- National ranking: 664 (out of 5,507 municipalities)

== See also ==
- List of municipalities in Goiás
- Microregions of Goiás
