= Lázaro Barbosa de Sousa =

Brazilian serial killer (1988–2021)

- Born: 27 August 1988; Barra do Mendes, Bahia, Brazil
- Died: 28 June 2021 (aged 32); Águas Lindas de Goiás, Goiás, Brazil
- Cause of death: Gunshot wounds
- Other names: O Carrasco do Incra 9; Índio; Satanista
- Known for: Mass murder and long police chase
- Criminal charges: Manslaughter, robbery, kidnapping, rape
- Capture status: Killed
- Wanted by: Civil Police of Goiás; Military Police of Goiás; Civil Police of the Federal District; Military Police of the Federal District; Federal Highway Police
- Escaped: 23 July 2018
- Escape end: 28 June 2021

Details
- Victims: 9
- Span of crimes: 2007–2021
- Killed: 6
- Injured: 3
- Weapons: Knife, .32 caliber revolver, handgun

Lázaro Barbosa de Sousa (27 August 1988 – 28 June 2021) was a Brazilian mass murderer, serial killer, and rapist. He murdered two people in 2007 and escaped prison several times. On 9 June 2021, he murdered four members of a family in Ceilândia and fled, triggering a 20-day manhunt which culminated with his death in a shootout with police.

== Criminal history ==
He was arrested in Bahia in 2007 for killing two people, but escaped ten days later, and moved to the Federal District. Two years later, he was arrested again in Brasília and sent to Papuda prison, this time he was convicted of theft, rape, and illegal possession of a firearm. In 2013, a team of doctors concluded that he had serious mental issues, and described Lázaro as impulsive, anxious, mentally unstable, and with "sexual worries". During Easter of 2016, he again escaped after being temporarily allowed to leave prison.

In 2018, he was recaptured but escaped again.

== Timeline of 2021 criminal activities ==
=== 9 June 2021 ===
On 9 June 2021, de Sousa invaded a smallholding located in Incra 9, in the city of Ceilândia, where he murdered 48-year-old local businessman Cláudio Vidal and his sons Gustavo Marques, aged 21, and Carlos Eduardo Marques, aged 15. While he was running away, he took in hostage 43-years-old Cleonice Marques, wife and mother of the three killed.

Before being kidnapped, Marques managed to contact her brother and alert him about what happened at her home. Cleonice's brother went to the house and called the police. Marques was however murdered, and her remains were found three days later.

=== 10 June ===
On the following day, Barbosa broke into another smallholding, three kilometers away from the one he had broken into previously, keeping as hostages the owner and the caretaker of the house for three hours. While there, he forced the owner to cook for him while he boasted about his previous crime, which was already getting media coverage. Barbosa also forced the victims to drink and do drugs with him. After that, he ran away taking cellphones, a jacket and 200 reais with him. This time, he did not kill nor hurt anyone.

=== 11 June ===
Barbosa stole a car in Ceilândia and then drove to Cocalzinho de Goiás, in the neighboring state of Goiás, where he arsoned the car to make it harder for police to follow him. A partner aided him in his escape.

=== 12 June ===
On 12 June, Barbosa invaded a smallholding and held a caretaker hostage, and forced the man to drink with him, on this day he did not rob nor hurt the caretaker.

On this day, police intelligence discovered some places he had used as a hideout, police officers also located the remains of Cleonice, the woman he had kidnapped on 9 June.

On the same night, Barbosa broke into another smallholding. Three persons were inside the house, they fought back and were shot, all three were wounded, and two were left in critical condition. After shooting the house occupants, Barbosa fled taking two guns from the smallholding. Later, on the same day, he arsoned a house and exchanged fire with the police, but managed to evade them.

=== 13 June ===
Barbosa evaded police, stole a parked car, and drove for 30 km until coming close to a barrier set up by the police, then he abandoned the car and ran away by foot to the woods where he kept hiding.

=== 14 June ===
During 14 June, there were no registers about Barbosa's movements around the region, a farm caretaker allegedly exchanged fire with the criminal and said he shot and wounded Barbosa in the dawn between 14 and 15 June. Police did not investigate if the caretaker's account was true. The caretaker was not hurt during the shootout.

=== 15 June ===
Barbosa was found by rural patrollers who were participating in the siege for him after he attacked a family, he exchanged fire with the police and nicked a police officer, the officer fled to a hospital and recovered quickly. Barbosa was apparently unharmed, thus discrediting the story told by the caretaker. The Public Security Secretariat could not inform if Barbosa was injured during the shootout.

=== 16 June ===
Barbosa was spotted by inhabitants of Cocalzinho de Goiás. After being spotted, he invaded a house where there were three persons, subjugating two of the three victims. One of the hostages, a teenager, contacted the police while hiding in a bedroom. The house was under police surveillance and Barbosa broke into the house after the departure of the officers.

Barbosa found the teenager and took the three hostages to the woods, where he destroyed their phones. When he noticed the police helicopters surrounding him, he set the hostages free and ran away. Authorities suspect that Barbosa spent the night in an abandoned smallholding, after finding signs of recent home invasions and a blood-stained shirt, which meant that Barbosa might have been hurt or that he had hunted an animal recently.

=== 17 June ===
Barbosa and the police exchange fire during a siege in Cocalzinho de Goiás rural zone. The shootout left some men injured, but no further information was published.

=== 18 June ===
Barbosa was spotted in a sty during a siege in Girassóis district, but he managed to evade the police. Public Security secretary, Rodney Miranda, allegedly saw Barbosa in a valley a kilometer away from him.

=== 19 June ===
Barbosa was supposedly seen hiding in a cave around Águas Lindas de Goiás, a city near Federal District, which prompted the police to search for him in the vicinity. Investigations later concluded that this information was false.

=== 24 June ===
After searches, the secretary of Public Security said in a press conference that the police had arrested two men who were supposedly helping Barbosa escape. They were the farmer Elmir Caetano Evangelista and the caretaker Alain Reis dos Santos. According to Alain's testimony to the police, Barbosa slept for five days on Elmir's house, and had lunch and dinner there. Alain also said that Elmir would call Barbosa by shouting to the woods. Elmir, nonetheless, according to his defense, denied everything, and said that he was just kidding when he shouted for Barbosa.

=== 26 June ===
On this day, the police revealed that Barbosa had created a fake Facebook profile that went by the name of "Patrik Sousa", probably to follow the news around him. The account was created from a stolen phone that the criminal kept with him between 15 and 18 June.

== Death ==
On 28 June, the governor of Goiás, Ronaldo Caiado, announced that Barbosa had been arrested. He was found at his ex-mother-in-law's house. He died during a shootout with the police after being surrounded and shooting back.

Brazil president Jair Bolsonaro celebrated Barbosa's death on social media. "Congratulations to the PM-GO heroes for putting an end to the terror carried out by the criminal Lazaro, who humiliated and murdered men and women in cold blood."
