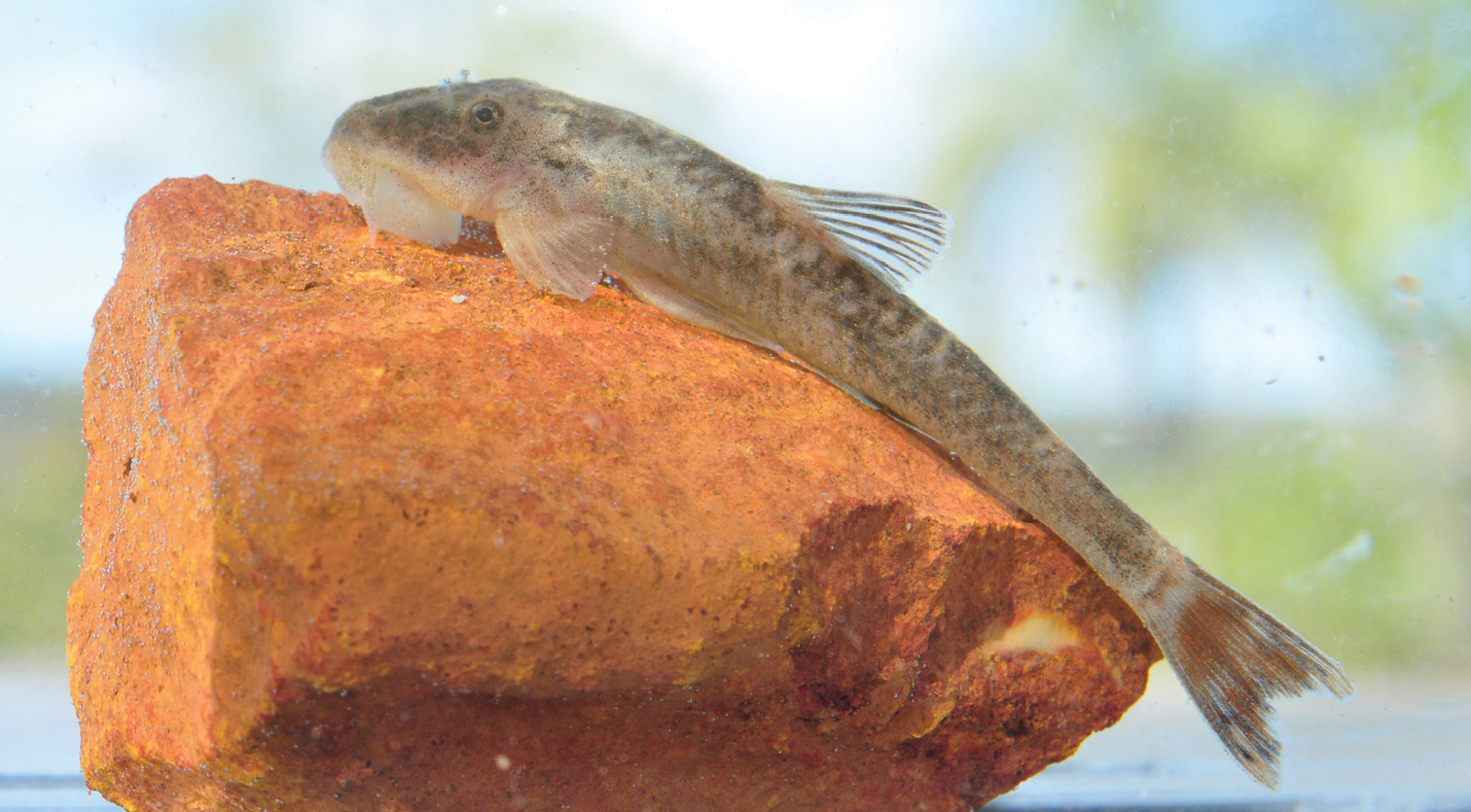

Conservation status
- Near Threatened (IUCN 3.1)

Scientific classification
- Kingdom: Animalia
- Phylum: Chordata
- Class: Actinopterygii
- Order: Siluriformes
- Family: Loricariidae
- Genus: Rhinolekos
- Species: R. capetinga

Binomial name
- Rhinolekos capetinga Roxo, Ochoa, G. S. C. Silva & Oliveira, 2015

= Rhinolekos capetinga =

Species of catfish

Rhinolekos capetinga is a species of freshwater ray-finned fish belonging to the family Loricariidae, the suckermouth armoured catfishes, and the subfamily Hypoptopomatinae, the cascudinhos. This catfish is endemic to Brazil.

== Taxonomy ==
Rhinolekos capetinga was first formally described in 2014 by the Brazilian ichthyologists Fábio Fernandes Roxo, Luz E. Orrego Ochoa, Gabriel de Souza da Costa e Silva and Claudio de Oliveira with its type locality given as the da Branca stream in Água Fria de Goiás in the drainage of the Tocantizinho River, part of the Tocantins River basin at 14°53'47.2"S, 47°34'58.4"W in the Brazilian state of Goiás. Eschmeyer's Catalog of Fishes classified the genus Pseudotocinclus in the subfamily Hypoptopomatinae, the cascudinhos, within the suckermouth armored catfish family Loricariidae.

== Etymology ==
Rhinolekos capetinga is the classified in the genus Rhinolekos, this name combines rhinos, which is the genitive of rhis, meaning "beak" or "snout", with lekos, a "dish", "pot" or "pan", an allusion to the large plate located between second infraorbital plate and nostrils, projected forward and surrounding the nares. The specific name, capetinga, is a Tupí-Guarani word which means "white or clear water", this was an old name which had fallen into disuse for the municipality of São João d'Aliança. a location where a paratype was collected.

== Description ==
Rhinolekos capetinga has its dorsal fin supported by 8 or 9 soft rays while its anal fin contains 6 soft rays. This species has an elongated body and reaches a standard length of 3.9 cm (1.5 in). It can be told apart from the other Rhinolekos species by the combination of the following characteristics: having 31 vertebrae, the front part of the compound supraneural-first dorsal-fin proximal radial touches the neural spine of the 9th vertebra, this species has no transverse dark bands on the fin rays of the pectoral, pelvic and anal fins, the row of plates on the back contains between 24 and 28 plates; there are no odontodes on the lower part of the tip of the snout; there are no accessory teeth; the prenasal is longer, the head smaller and the snout is longer.

== Distribution and habitat ==
Rhinolekos capetinga is endemicto Brazil where its kniwn distribution is restricted to two localities, both tributaries of the Tocantizinho River, part of the Tocantins River system, in the state of Goiás. The localities this species has been recorded in had clear, shallow water and medium to fast current, with these catfishes being found in and around submerged and riparian vegetation.

== Conservation status ==
Rhinolekos capetinga has onlt been recorded from two streams, both tributaries of the Tocantizinho River in the Tocantins River basin, Goiás State, Brazil. A continuing deteriation in habitat quality may be inferred based on the threats that include agricultural intensification, cattle ranching, mineral extraction and siltation which are widespread factors in this region. The International Union for Conservation of Nature has classified this species as Near Threatened.
