= Mimoso =

Mimoso refers to several cities in Brazil.

- Mimoso, a city in the state of Mato Grosso do Sul
- Mimoso, a city in the state of Pernambuco
- Mimoso de Goiás, a city in the state of Goiás
- Mimoso do Sul, a city in the state of Espírito Santo
