= Água Fria de Goiás =

- Municipality
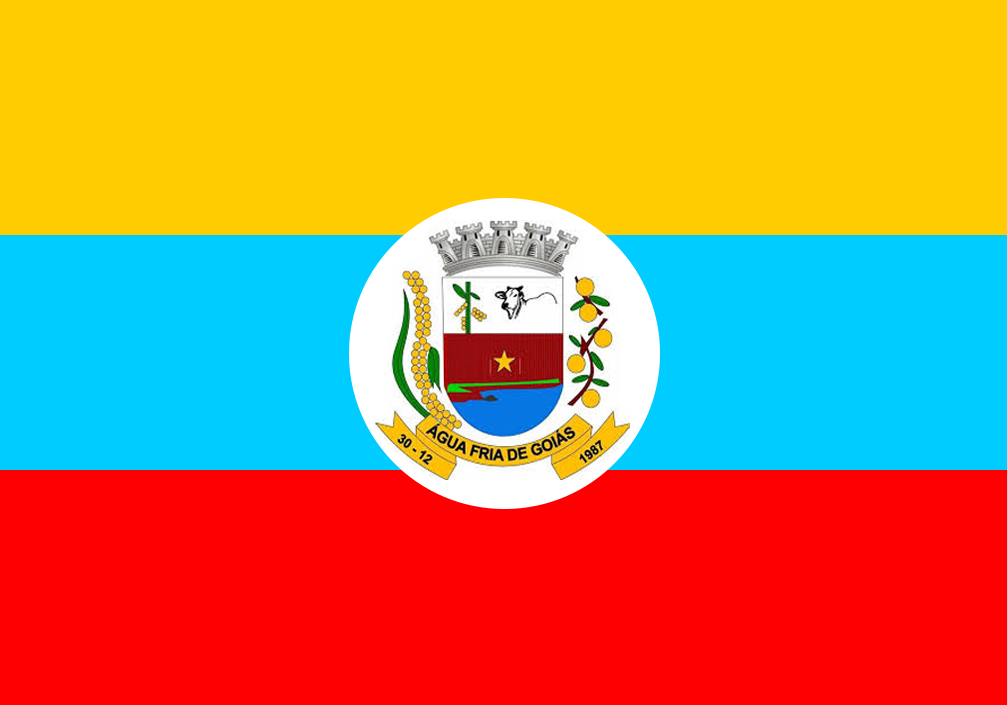
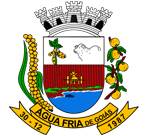
- Flag Coat of arms

- Location in Goiás state

- Location in Brazil
- Coordinates: 14°58′51″S 47°46′08″W
- Country: Brazil
- Region: Central-West
- State: Goiás
- Microregion: Entorno do Distrito Federal

Area
  - Total: 2,029.4 km^{2} (783.6 sq mi)
- Elevation: 980 m (3,220 ft)

Population (2020)
  - Total: 5,793
  - Density: 2.855/km^{2} (7.393/sq mi)
- Time zone: UTC−3 (BRT)
- Postal code: 73780-000

Água Fria de Goiás is a municipality in northern Goiás state, Brazil.

== Location ==
Água Fria became a city in 1989 when it was dismembered from Planaltina de Goiás in 1989. Água Fria is located in the microregion called Entorno do Distrito Federal, although it is almost 156 kilometers of national capital of Brasília. Communications are made by BR-020 to Planaltina, then north, passing through Goiás. Another road links Água Fria by way of Mimoso de Goiás and Padre Bernardo.

The distance to the state capital, Goiânia, is 342 km. Highway connections are made by BR-153 / Anápolis / BR-060 / Alexânia / Planaltina (DF) / GO-430 / BR-010/GO-118 / São Gabriel (district) / GO-230.

Municipal boundaries:

- north: Niquelândia and Colinas do Sul
- east: Formosa
- west: Mimoso de Goiás
- south: Planaltina

== Description ==
Água Fria is a quiet rural town, far from the urban phenomena common to the cities located near Brasília. The urban area is made up of one main avenue, paved, and some cross streets. Along the avenue are the main public services which include the following: post office, telephone station, police station, town hall, health center, community center, tax office, a small library, and some small commercial shops and bars. The residences, of adobe or brick, are on the side streets, which are also unpaved. Water is furnished to the population but is untreated. The sewage system consists of individual dwellings using septic tanks. There is only one health clinic (with a non-resident doctor) and one school.

== Economy ==
The economy is based on cattle raising (44,900 head in 2006) and plantations of oranges (990 hectares), soybeans (19,000 hectares in 2006), corn (12,000 hectares in 2006), and beans. Orange production of 13,058 tons in 2006 made Água Fria the largest producer in the state. In 2006 there were 618 farms with a total area of 128,625 hectares, of which 26,500 hectares were cropland and 56,200 hectares were pasture. About 1,600 persons were directly connected to agriculture. Local commerce offers few employment possibilities and the biggest employer is the local government.

Motor vehicles

- Number of automobiles: 210
- Number of pickup trucks: 27
- Number of inhabitants per motor vehicle: 21.13

Main crops in hectares

- Rice: 500
- Banana: 56
- Sugarcane: 24
- Beans: 7,600
- Oranges: 990
- Corn: 15,000
- Soybeans: 20,000
- Sorghum: 700 (All data are from 2006)

== Health and education ==
Água Fria had a score of 0.69 on the 2000 Municipal Human Development Index, which gave it a state ranking of 212 (out of 242 municipalities) and a national ranking of 3064 (out of 5507 municipalities).

- Hospitals: none (February 2007)
- Schools: 13 with 1,531 students (2006)
- Literacy rate in 2000: 80.3%
- Infant mortality rate in 2000: 25.57

== See also ==
- List of municipalities in Goiás
- Microregions of Goiás
