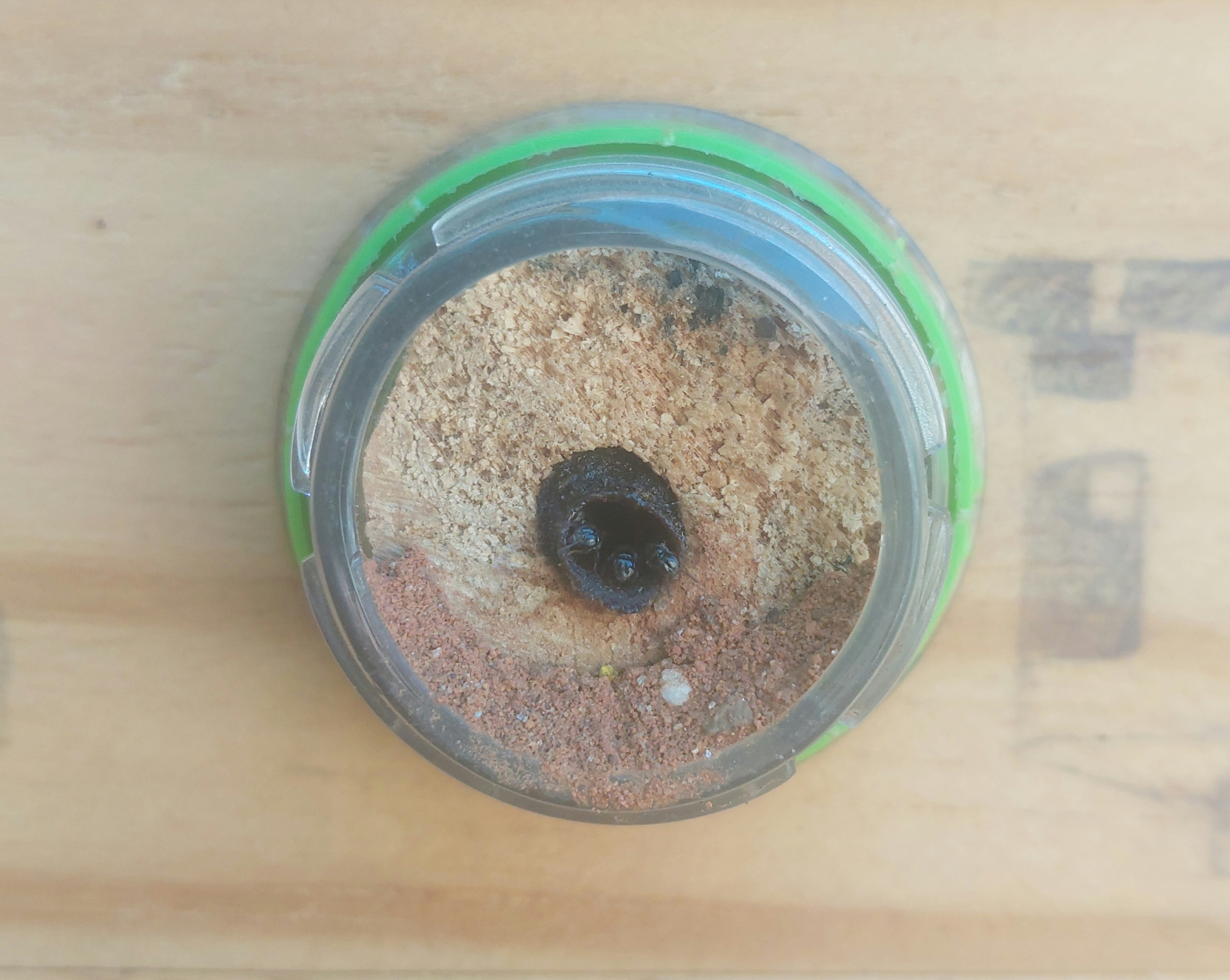
- Leurotrigona muelleri photographed in Águas Lindas de Goiás, Brazil

Scientific classification
- Kingdom: Animalia
- Phylum: Arthropoda
- Class: Insecta
- Order: Hymenoptera
- Family: Apidae
- Genus: Leurotrigona
- Species: L. muelleri

Binomial name
- Leurotrigona muelleri (Friese, 1900)

= Leurotrigona muelleri =

Species of bee

Leurotrigona muelleri is a species of very small stingless bee native to Brazil, mainly found in the states of Goiás, Distrito Federal, Tocantins, Pará, and Rondônia.

== Description ==
Leurotrigona muelleri is one of the tiniest stingless bees, measuring between 1.5 and 3.0 mm in length. It has a dark-colored body and is known for its extremely fast and agile movements.

== Behavior ==
This species is social and lives in colonies. It collects nectar and pollen from flowers, often visiting small flowers that larger bees cannot access. Despite its small size, it can defend its nest collectively, as is typical for stingless bees.

== Ecology ==
Leurotrigona muelleri plays an important role in pollinating native plants. Its colonies produce honey, although in very small amounts.

== Distribution ==
This bee is found in central and northern Brazil, including the states of Goiás, Distrito Federal, Tocantins, Pará, and Rondônia. It typically inhabits forested areas, gardens, and urban environments where flowers are present.

== Curiosities ==
- Leurotrigona muelleri is known locally as "abelha lambe-olhos" (eye-licking bee) due to its habit of licking the tears of mammals for salt and other minerals.
- It is extremely small, often less than 2 mm, making it one of the tiniest bees in the world.
- Despite its size, it is capable of efficient pollination and contributes significantly to local ecosystems.
