= Planaltina, Goiás =

Planaltina Municipality
- Municipality
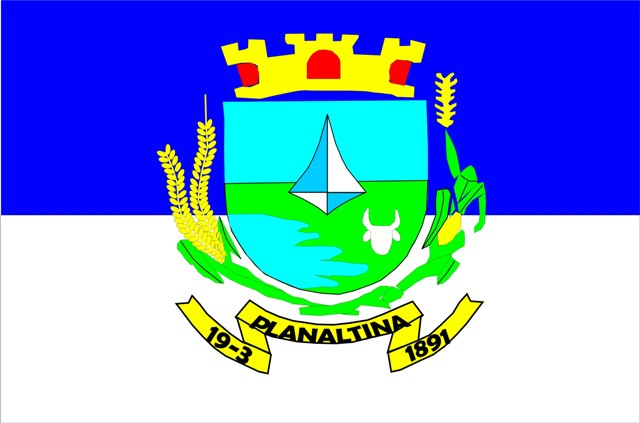
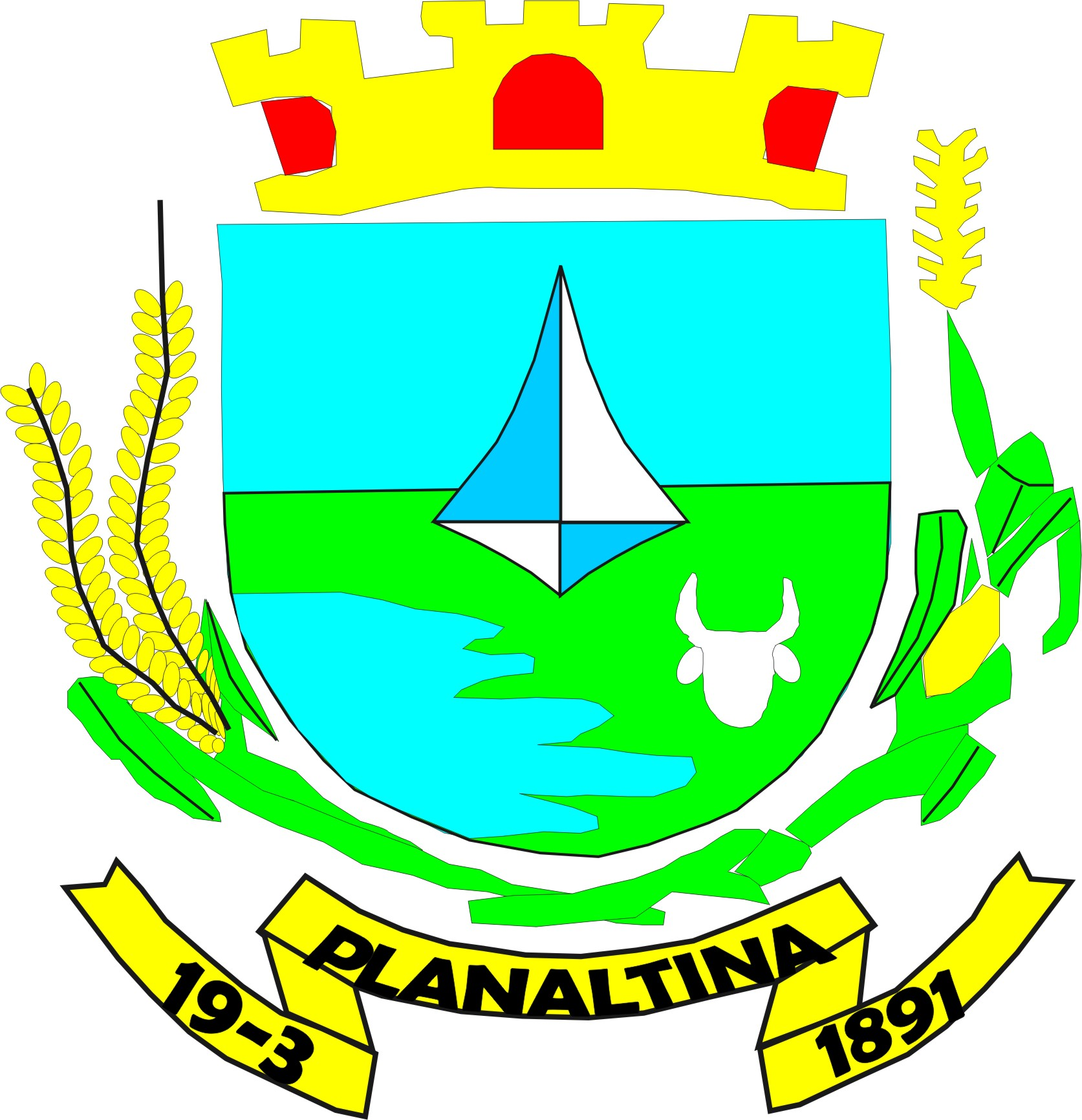
- Flag Coat of arms

- Location in Goiás state

- Location in Brazil
- Coordinates: 15°10′21″S 49°40′07″W
- Country: Brazil
- Region: Central-West
- State: Goiás
- Microregion: Entorno do Distrito Federal

Area
  - Total: 2,539.1 km^{2} (980.4 sq mi)
- Elevation: 944 m (3,097 ft)

Population (2022 Census)
  - Total: 105,031
  - Estimate (2025): 112,304
  - Density: 41.365/km^{2} (107.14/sq mi)
- Time zone: UTC−3 (BRT)
- Postal code: 73750-000
- Website: www.planaltina.go.gov.br/index.htm

Planaltina is a city located in the Metropolitan Region of Brasilia, center of the state of Goiás, Brazil. While the official city name is Planaltina, it is also informally referred to as Planaltina de Goiás or Brasilinha (Little Brasília).

== Location and Geography ==
Planaltina is part of micro-region 12 of the state, the so-called Entorno do Distrito Federal. It borders Água Fria de Goiás, Formosa, Mimoso de Goiás, Padre Bernardo and, the Distrito Federal.

It is located on the northeastern boundary of the Federal District north of the satellite city of Planaltina, DF. It is 273 kilometers from the state capital Goiânia and 43 km (27 mi). from Central Zone (Plano Piloto).

Planaltina is the gateway to an enormous area of ecological preservation, in which can be found the important Chapada dos Veadeiros national park. Nearby is Lagoa Formosa, which, with its 17 square kilometers of surface area, is the largest natural lake in the state of Goiás. Also nearby is the source of the Maranhão River, which flows north into the Tocantins

The population is very poor and there is a serious deficit in infrastructure with no hospitals and poor commercial facilities. Most of the inhabitants work in Plano Piloto (Central Zone of Brasília) and spend hours on buses due to the intense traffic of urban public transport and cars of the thousands of workers from the suburbs who move towards the Plano Piloto (Central Zone of Brasilia). According to studies, at least one member of each family works in the Plano Piloto. The per capita income is from one to two minimum salaries.

== Economy ==
The economy is based on agriculture (soybeans (9,000 hectares in 2006), corn, manioc and citrus fruits), cattle raising (62,000 head in 2006), services, public administration (1,328 workers in 2003), and small transformation industries. In 2007 there were 02 financial institutions.

Agricultural data 2006

- Farms: 959
- Total area: 134,617 ha.
- Area of permanent crops: 2,114 ha.
- Area of perennial crops: 25,659 ha.
- Area of natural pasture: 66,928 ha.
- Area of woodland and forests: 27,905 ha.
- Persons dependent on farming: 1,350
- Number of tractors: 205 IBGE

== History ==
Planaltina had already become a municipality in 1981, but with the installation of the Federal District in 1960 it lost part of its territory, including the municipal seat. As a consequence a new city had to be built, which for some time was called Brasilinha. The traditional Planaltina became a satellite city of Brasília.

The site chosen for the new Planaltina was the farmhouse Brasília belonging to Joaquim Gonçalves, known as Joaquim Mineiro. In 1967 the city hall was built and it was given the name Planaltina after a plebiscite carried out in the same year.

The early years were similar to those of the development of Brasília, with the cerrado being cleaned and wooden shacks being put up. The similarity with Brasília was such that people would say "they are building a little Brasília, a Brasilinha, thus baptizing the new city.

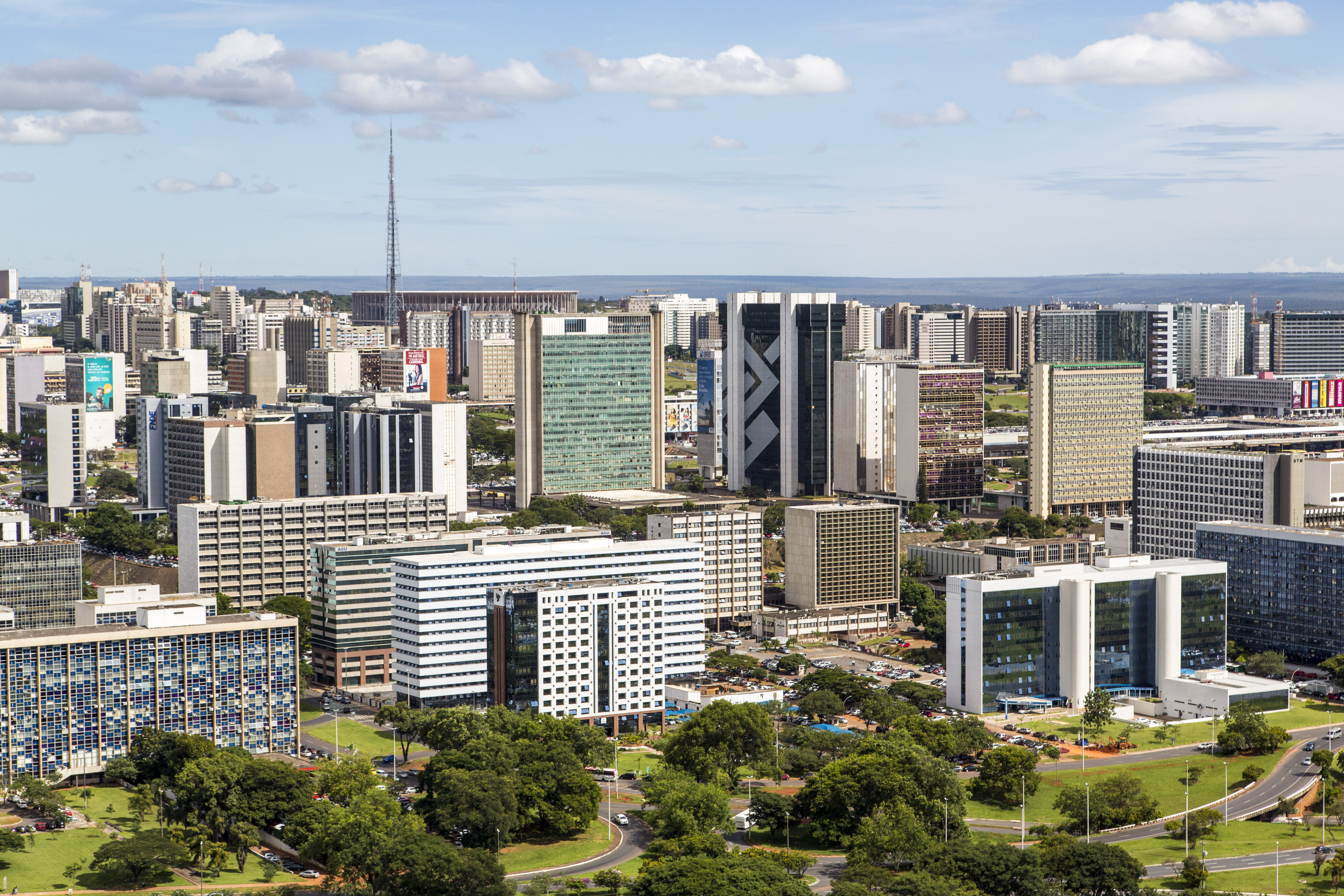
Plano Piloto, Central Zone of the Metropolitan Region of Brasilia, where thousands of residents of satellist cities like Planaltina-Go, Taguatinga, Águas Claras, Valparaiso-Go, Águas Lindas de Goiás, and other satellites cities work.

The first plan envisioned 22 thousand lots that would each house 5 persons. In fewer than 30 years the population had reached 80 thousand inhabitants. Much of the population explosion came about because of the construction of Brasília. A massive migratory wave came to the federal capital and there was no space in the original plan. The military government at the time would not allow these families to squat on federal lands and sent the excess population to Planaltina.

Planaltina gave up most of its territory including its municipal seat to form the new Federal District, but never received any indemnification for this loss. See History of Planaltina

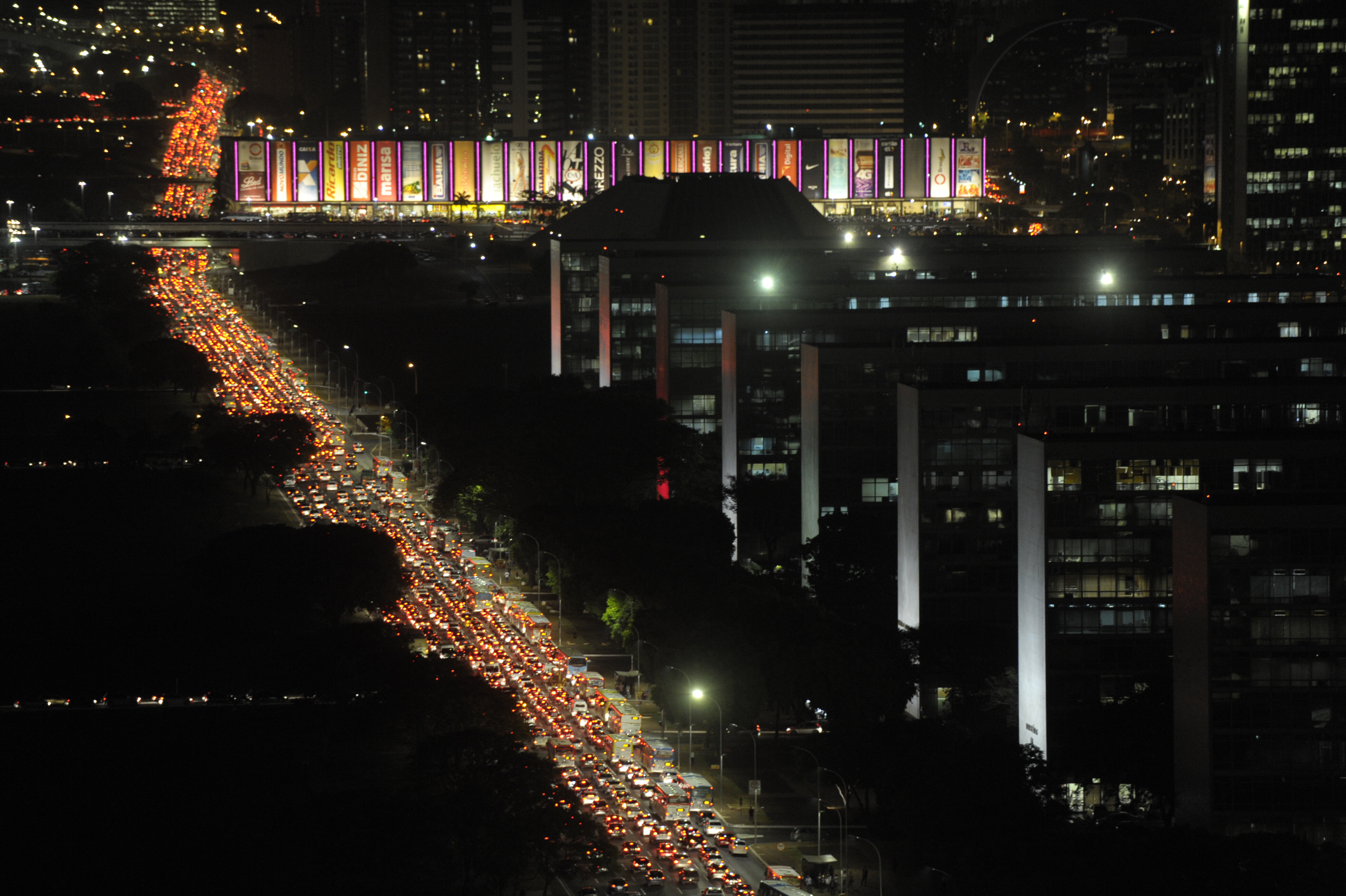
Intense traffic faced every day by residents of the Metropolitan Region of Brasilia, who travel at the end of the day of the Plano Piloto towards the satellite cities, such as Planaltina-Go, Ocidental-Go, Recanto das Emas, Gama, among other satellite cities.

== Health and education ==
- Schools: 58 with 26,000 students (2006)
- Higher education: campus of the UEG

Municipal Human Development Index: 0.723 (medium classification)

- State ranking: 167 (out of 242 municipalities)
- National ranking: 2,577 (out of 5,507 municipalities)
- Literacy rate (2000): 85.6%
- Infant mortality rate (2000): 24.5

== See also ==
- List of municipalities in Goiás
