= Rhinolekos schaeferi =

Conservation status
- Least Concern (IUCN 3.1)

Scientific classification
- Kingdom: Animalia
- Phylum: Chordata
- Class: Actinopterygii
- Order: Siluriformes
- Family: Loricariidae
- Genus: Rhinolekos
- Species: R. schaeferi

Binomial name
- Rhinolekos schaeferi Martins & Langeani, 2011

Species of catfish

Rhinolekos schaeferi is a species of freshwater ray-finned fish belonging to the family Loricariidae, the suckermouth armoured catfishes, and the subfamily Hypoptopomatinae, the cascudinhos. This catfish is endemic to Brazil.

== Taxonomy ==
Rhinolekos schaeferi was first formally described in 2011 by the Brazilian ichthyologists Fernanda de Oliveira Martins and Francisco Langeani with its type locality given as the Fazenda stream at Chácara Fernanda, Alexânia, in the Paranaíba River drainage, at around 16°07'S, 48°31'W, in the Brazilian state of Goiás. Eschmeyer's Catalog of Fishes classified the genus Pseudotocinclus in the subfamily Hypoptopomatinae, the cascudinhos, within the suckermouth armored catfish family Loricariidae.

== Etymology ==
Rhinolekos schaeferi is the classified within the genus Rhinolekos, this name combines rhinos, which is the genitive of rhis, meaning "beak" or "snout", with lekos, a "dish", "pot" or "pan", an allusion to the large plate located between second infraorbital plate and nostrils, projected forward and surrounding the nares. The specific name honours the American ichthyologist Scott Allen Schaefer in recognition of his remarkable contributions to the study of the cascudinhos.

== Description ==
Rhinolekos schaeferi has its dorsal fin supported by 8 or 9 soft rays while its anal fin contains 6 soft rays. It can be told apart from the other Rhinolekos species using the following characteristics: the presence of accessory teeth on the premaxilla and dentary; its shallower caudal peduncle ; having fewer, 18 to 20, mid-dorsal plate. It can be distinguished from R. britskii in the fin rays of the pectoral, pelvic and anal fins do not have transverse dark bands, having 32 vertebrae; it can be identified from R. garavelloi by having 26-28 dorsal plates, 20-22 mid-ventral plates, a larger postanal length; shorter thorax and a slender head. This species has an elongated body and it reaches a standard length of 3.8 cm (1.5 in).

== Distribution and habitat ==
Rhinolekos schaeferi is endemic to Brazil where it is only known from its type locality which is located in the Paranaíba River basin, in the upper Paraná River system. Little is known aboutis biology and ecology.

== Conservation status ==
Rhinolekos schaeferi is classified by the International Union for Conservation of Nature as Near Threatened because its known range is restricted to the immediate vicinity of its type locality where it is threatened by agricultural expansion and domestic sewage pollution.
