= São Gabriel =

São Gabriel (Portuguese for "Saint Gabriel") may refer to:

== Brazil ==
=== Municipalities ===
- São Gabriel, Bahia
- São Gabriel, Rio Grande do Sul
- São Gabriel do Oeste, in Mato Grosso do Sul
- São Gabriel da Cachoeira, in Amazonas
- São Gabriel da Palha, Espírito Santo

=== Other uses ===
- São Gabriel (ship), flagship of Vasco da Gama's armada
- São Gabriel Futebol Clube — de São Gabriel (Rio Grande do Sul)
