= Rhinolekos britskii =

Conservation status
- Least Concern (IUCN 3.1)

Scientific classification
- Kingdom: Animalia
- Phylum: Chordata
- Class: Actinopterygii
- Order: Siluriformes
- Family: Loricariidae
- Genus: Rhinolekos
- Species: R. britskii

Binomial name
- Rhinolekos britskii Martins, Langeani & Costa, 2011

Species of catfish

Rhinolekos britskii is a species of freshwater ray-finned fish belonging to the family Loricariidae, the suckermouth armoured catfishes, and the subfamily Hypoptopomatinae, the cascudinhos. This catfish is endemic to Brazil.

== Taxonomy ==
Rhinolekos britskii was first formally described in 2011 by the Brazilian ichthyologists Fernanda de Oliveira Martins, Francisco Langeani and Filipe Cezaro Costa with its type locality given as Bela Vista de Goiás, a tributary of the Arapuca stream, Fazenda Arapuca, in the Paranaíba River drainage at 17°04'06"S, 48°43'59"W in the Brazilian state of Goiás. R. britskii was described at the same time as two other new species, R. garavelloi and R. schaeferi which wer all placed in the new genus Rhinolekos with this species designated as the type species. Eschmeyer's Catalog of Fishes classified the genus Pseudotocinclus in the subfamily Hypoptopomatinae, the cascudinhos, within the suckermouth armored catfish family Loricariidae.

== Etymology ==
Rhinolekos britskii is the type species of the genus Rhinolekos, this name combines rhinos, which is the genitive of rhis, meaning "beak" or "snout", with lekos, a "dish", "pot" or "pan", an allusion to the large plate located between second infraorbital plate and nostrils, projected forward and surrounding the nares. The specific name honours the Brazilian ichthyologist Heraldo A. Britski in recognition of his work on the cascudinhos and his contributions to Neotropical ichthyology.

== Description ==
Rhinolekos britskii has its dorsal fin supported by 8 or 9 soft rays while its anal fin contains 6 soft rays. It can be told apart from the other Rhinolekos species by the possession of transverse dark bands on the rays of the pectoral, pelvic and anal fins. It also has 31 rather than 32 vertebrae and other skeletal differences. It differs from R. garavelloi in some meristic measurements and in having ferwer dorsal plates. It is distinguished from R. schaeferi by lacking accessory teeth on the premaxilla and the dentary and in the greater number of dorsal plates. This species has an elongated body and it reaches a standard length of 4 cm (1.6 in).

== Distribution and habitat ==
Rhinolekos britskii is endemic to Brazil where its distribution is restricted to the drainage system of the Paranaíba River, part of the Parana basin in the state of Goiás. There is however, little information on the ecology and biology of this species.
