= Cidade Eclética =

Coordinates: 15°52′S 48°20′W

Cidade Eclética (Eclectic City) is a religious commune founded by the spiritualist Mestre Yokaanam (died 1985), and is located 62 km west of Brasília, Brazil, in the state of Goiás. It belongs to the municipality of Santo Antonio do Descoberto. It has a population of around 1,500 persons, of whom 790 were registered to vote in 2004. The inhabitants depend on agriculture, leather handicrafts, and cattle raising for their livelihood.

Mestre Yokaanam said that his city was the world religious center, guided by the religion that he founded, the Igreja Eclética Espiritualista Universal. This sect is described as an eclectic-religious movement, philanthropic and universalist, and "pioneer in the unification of all the sects of the planet." There are strong connections with Umbanda, an Afro-Brazilian religion. Another name given to this religion by Yokaanam was Umbanda Eclética Maior.

== Mestre Yokaanam ==
Mestre Yokaanam, who was born in Maceió, Alagoas in 1911, considered himself a reincarnation of Elijah and John the Baptist. Yokaanam is supposedly an anagram of John the Baptist's name and means "The Diver".

Yokaanam's real name was Oceano de Sá and he was an officer and pilot in the Brazilian Air Force. Legend says that he was flying over the region where Brasília was to be built and was visited by an extraterrestrial being who told him that his real mission was on the Earth and not in the skies. But Oceano did not believe the visitor, with the result that the plane crashed and he woke up in the hospital. When he opened his eyes the same being was at his side, asking: "And now, did you learn?". The next day de Sá allegedly left the air force and changed his name to Yokaanam.

His abilities as a medium supposedly began when he was 13 years old. In one of his books, he claims to have visited 300 Kardecist spiritual centers, 18 Masonic temples, 15 Theosophist temples, 823 Candomblé centers, 100 Protestant churches, and 4 Rosicrucian temples.

== The community ==
The original community was founded in Rio de Janeiro in 1946 and was transferred in 1956 to the Planalto Central, the central high plain where Brasília was to be built. Approximately three hundred families were in the first group. Many left but new members arrived to join the commune.

According to the official site there are 600 people living in the community today who are called "internal workers". Outside, but in contact with the work of the organization, are the "external workers." The Fraternity has 12 branches (or regionals) in several states and two outside of Brazil: one in Argentina and another in Paraguay. The total number of people connected to the movement is estimated to be 3,000.

With the death of Yokaanam, on April 21, 1985, three long-time followers of the leader took over leadership of the movement.
