= Pireneus State Park =

State park in Goiás, Brazil

- Parque Estadual dos Pireneus
- IUCN category II (national park)
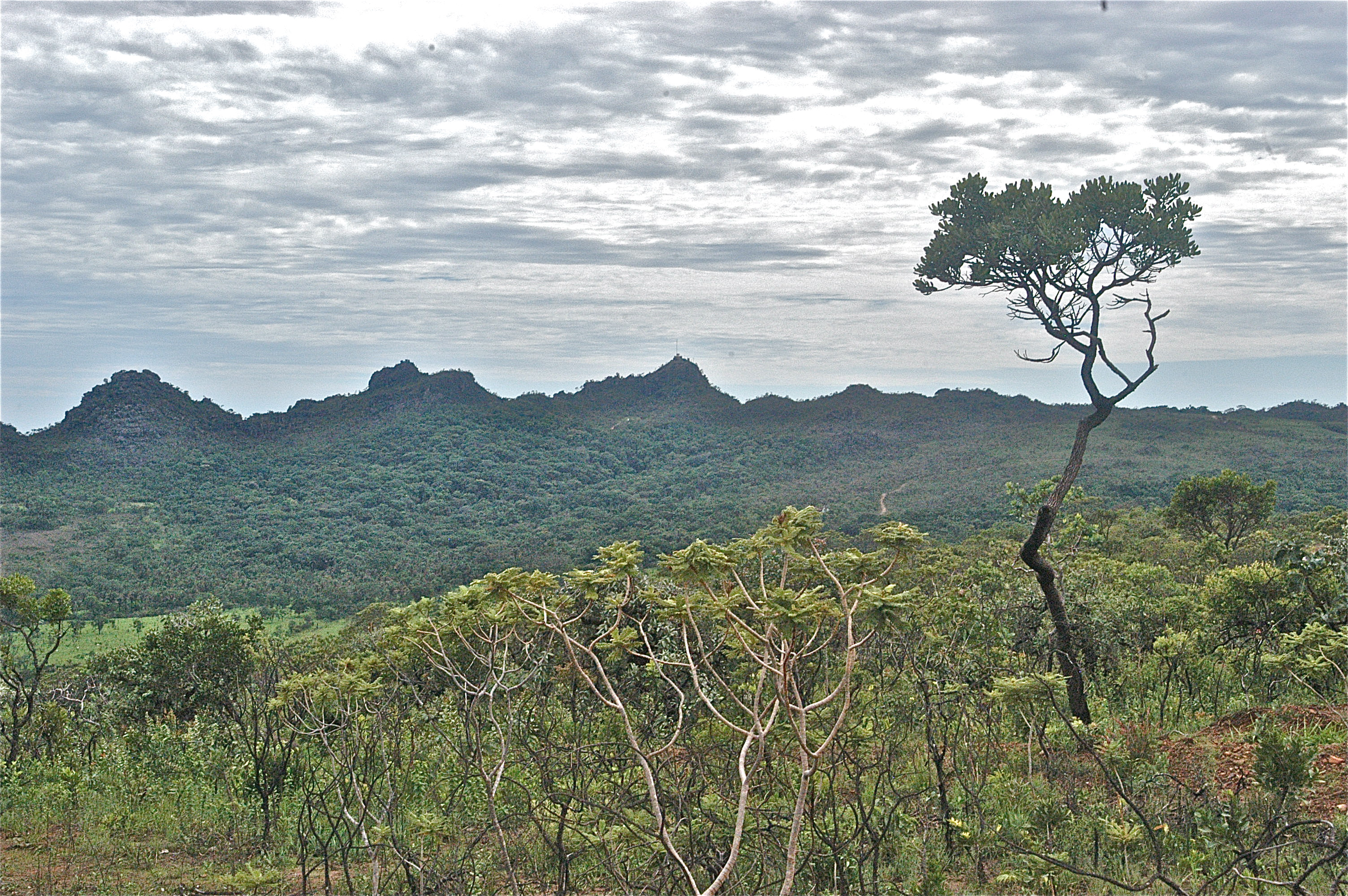
- Pico dos Pireneus

- Location within Brazil
- Nearest city: Pirenópolis, Goiás
- Coordinates: 15.796667°S 48.843611°W
- Area: 2,833.26 hectares (7,001.1 acres)
- Designation: State park
- Created: 1987
- Administrator: SEMARH: Secretaria de Meio Ambiente e Recursos Hídricos

The Pireneus State Park (Portuguese: Parque Estadual dos Pireneus, also called the Parque Estadual da Serra dos Pireneus), erroneously spelled "Pirineus", is a state park in the state of Goiás, Brazil. It protects an area of cerrado that includes the highest peak in the region, the 1,385 metres (4,544 ft) Pico dos Pireneus, on the watershed between the Plata and Tocantins river basins.

== Location ==
The Pireneus State Park is in the municipalities of Pirenópolis, Cocalzinho de Goiás and Corumbá de Goiás in the state of Goiás. It has an area of 2,833.26 hectares (7,001.1 acres). The park is 20 kilometres (12 mi) from the city of Pirenópolis by dirt road, and 6 kilometres (3.7 mi) from the town of Cocalzinho de Goiás.

The park is in rugged terrain in the Alto Tocantins-Paranaíba Plateau, with altitudes ranging from 140 to 1,000 metres (460 to 3,280 ft). There are dozens of small springs that feed the das Almas River in the Tocantins basin and the Corumbá River in the Plata basin. The Pico dos Pireneus is the highest point of the region at 1,385 metres (4,544 ft). There is a small chapel dedicated to the Holy Trinity at its summit. Its slopes define the edge of the Central Plateau of Brazil, and it forms the divide between the Plata and Tocantins river basins. The Morro Cabeludo is over 1,350 metres (4,430 ft), with quartzite rocks from the precambrian period formed about 1 billion years ago.

== Environment ==
The Pireneus State Park is classed as IUCN protected area category II (national park). The objectives are preservation of natural ecosystems of great ecological relevance and scenic beauty while enabling scientific research, education, environmental interpretation, recreation in contact with nature and ecological tourism. The park preserves the flora, fauna and water sources. Average annual rainfall is 1,500 millimetres (59 in). Average daily temperatures range from 19 to 33 °C (66 to 91 °F) and average 22 °C (72 °F). The park is in the cerrado biome. The park holds cerrado rupestre vegetation, which grows on rocks and includes endemic species of cacti, orchids and bromeliads. There are also forests, grasslands and other types of cerrado vegetation.

== History ==
A group of scientists who were demarcating the quadrilateral of the federal district of Brasília measured the altitude and coordinates of the Pico dos Pireneus on 8 August 1892. A small wooden chapel was erected on the peak in 1927, and the first mass was held on 18 June 1927 attended by 35 people. The chapel was destroyed by a gale in 1935, though a masonry chapel built the same year still stands.

The Pireneus State Park was created by law 10.321 of 20 November 1987 in the municipality of Pirenópolis, covering the area of the Picos de Pirineus, its mountains and slopes. Law 13.121 of 16 July 1997 altered the wording to include the municipalities of Corumbá and Cocalzinho de Goiás. Decree 4.830 of 15 October 1997 defined the boundaries, and gave an area of 2,833.26 hectares (7,001.1 acres). The park protects one of the highest ranges in the State of Goiás, the Serra dos Pireneus. It is administered by the Secretariat of Environment and Water Resources (SEMARH) of Goiás.

== Visiting ==
As of 2016, the park did not have a management plan, and there was no control over visits. The park is open from 8am to 5pm, or from 9am to 8pm during daylight saving time. Domestic animals are not allowed. Hunting, fishing, fires and the use of alcohol are prohibited, and visitors must not collect specimens of flora, fauna or rocks, or cause any damage to the environment. Although not required, a local guide is advisable, since there are no signposts or marked trails to the most attractive parts of the park. The main attractions are the Pico dos Pireneus, the highest point in the region, the rock formations near the Morro Cabeludo, which are used by climbers, the Pocinhos do Sonrisal and the trails that are used by ecotourists.

== Sources ==
- Parque Estadual da Serra dos Pireneus (in Portuguese), Municipality of Pirenópolis
- "Roteiros - Atrações Do Parque Estadual Dos Pireneus", Portal das Cachoeiras (in Portuguese)
- Santillo, Henrique Antônio; Freitas, Eugênio Alano Machado de (20 November 1987), Lei nº 10.321, de 20 de Novembro de 1987 (in Portuguese), Civil Cabinet of Goiás
- Unidade de Conservação: Parque Estadual dos Pirineus (in Portuguese), MMA: Ministério do Meio Ambiente
- Vilela, Luiz Alberto Maguito (16 July 1997), Lei nº 13.121, de 16 de Julho de 1997 (in Portuguese), Civil Cabinet of Goiás
- Vilela, Luiz Alberto Maguito; Cardoso, Josias Gonzaga (15 October 1997), Decreto nº 4.830, de 15 de Outubro de 1997 (in Portuguese), Civil Cabinet of Goiás
