= Vila Propício =

- Municipality
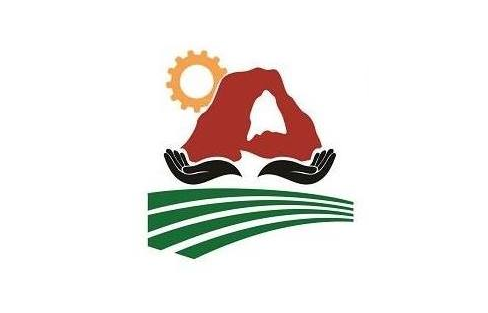
- Flag

- Location in Goiás state

- Location in Brazil
- Coordinates: 15°27′30″S 48°53′07″W
- Country: Brazil
- Region: Central-West
- State: Goiás
- Microregion: Entorno do Distrito Federal

Area
  - Total: 2,181.5 km^{2} (842.3 sq mi)
- Elevation: 744 m (2,441 ft)

Population (2020)
  - Total: 5,882
  - Density: 2.696/km^{2} (6.983/sq mi)
- Time zone: UTC−3 (BRT)
- Postal code: 72990-000

Vila Propício is a municipality in central Goiás state, Brazil. It is a large producer of sugarcane.

== Location ==
Vila Propício is located in the Entorno do Distrito Federal micro-region and has boundaries with the following municipalities:

- north: Barro Alto
- south: Pirenópolis and Cocalzinho de Goiás
- west: Goianésia
- east: Mimoso de Goiás and Padre Bernardo

Highway connections are made from Cocalzinho de Goiás and from Goianésia, which is 28 kilometers to the west. It is 195 kilometers to Brasília and 215 kilometers to Goiânia. From Goiânia take GO-080, passing through Nerópolis and São Francisco de Goiás; then BR-153 to Jaraguá; then GO-080 to Goianésia; then BR-251 / GO-230. For all distances see Distâncias Rodoviárias

== Economy ==
The economy is based on agriculture (cotton, rice rubber, corn, and soybeans), cattle raising (69,000 head in 2006), small commercial establishments, and public administration.

Agricultural data 2006

- Farms: 721
- Total area: 148,612 ha.
- Area of permanent crops: 1,194 ha.
- Area of perennial crops: 11,751 ha.
- Area of pasture: 93,882 ha.
- Area of woodland and forests: 39,430 ha.

== Health and Education ==
In 2007 there were no hospitals. The infant mortality rate (2000) was 21,46, well below the national average of 33.0, well the adult literacy rate was 75.2%, well below the national average of 86.4%, and one of the lowest in the state.

- Human Development Index: 0.674 (2000)
- State ranking: 225 (out of 242 municipalities)
- National ranking: 3,385 (out of 5,507 municipalities)

For the complete list see frigoletto.com.br.

Vila Propício first appeared in 1965 as a district of Pirenópolis, achieving municipal status in 1995.

=== See also ===
- List of municipalities in Goiás
- Microregions of Goiás
