= Corumbá de Goiás =

- Municipality
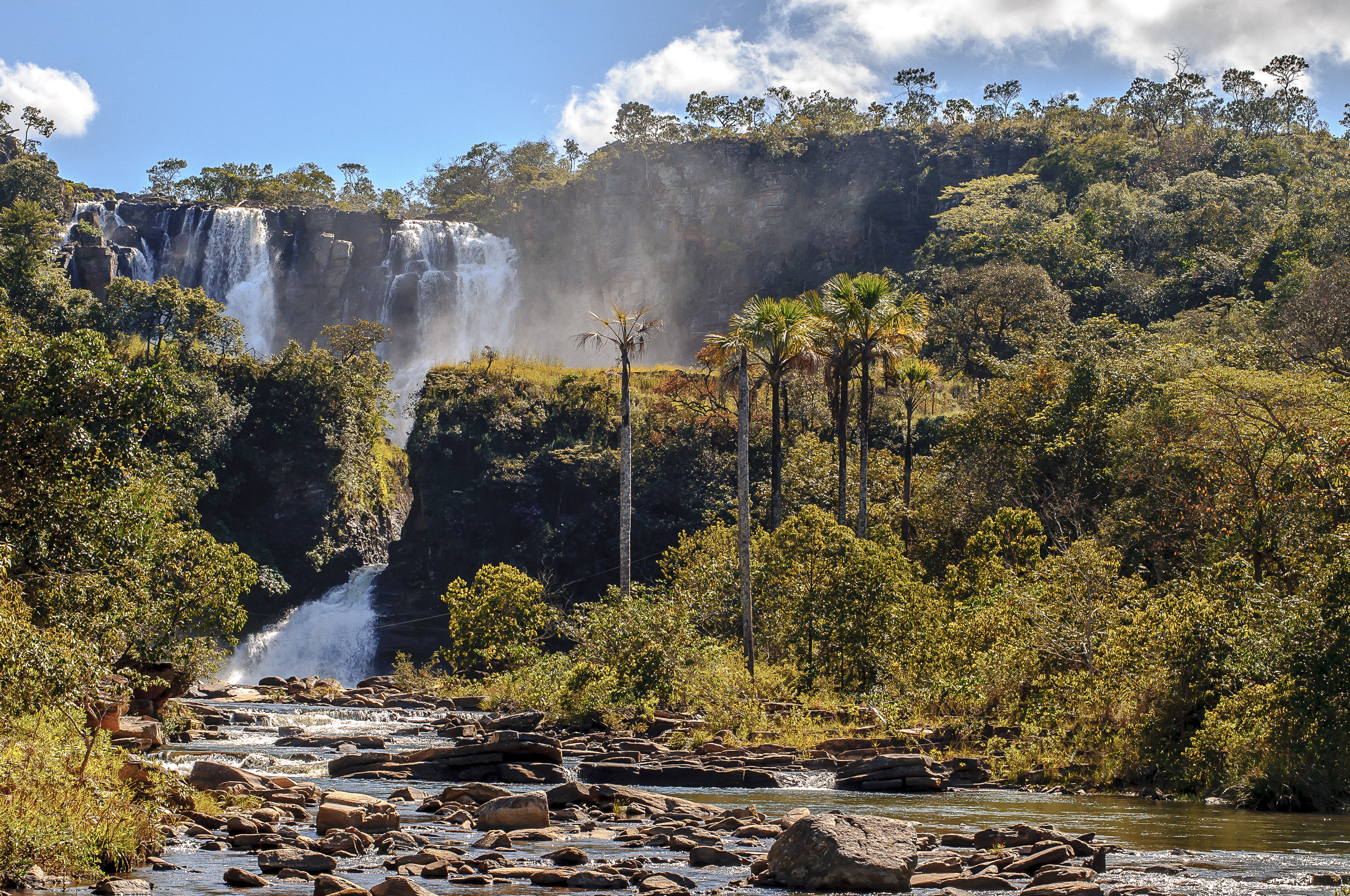

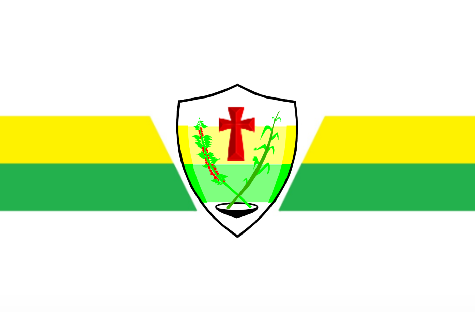
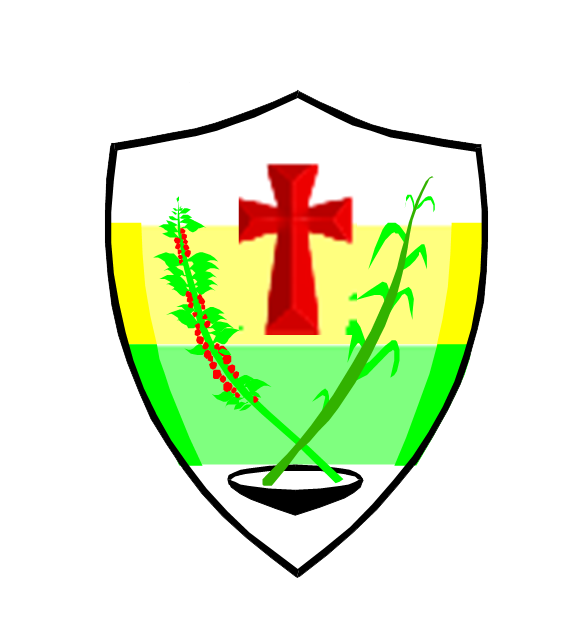
- Flag Coat of arms

- Location in Goiás state

- Location in Brazil
- Coordinates: 15°55′27″S 48°48′31″W
- Country: Brazil
- Region: Central-West
- State: Goiás
- Microregion: Entorno do Distrito Federal

Area
  - Total: 1,062.4 km^{2} (410.2 sq mi)
- Elevation: 950 m (3,120 ft)

Population (2020)
  - Total: 11,169
  - Density: 10.513/km^{2} (27.229/sq mi)
- Time zone: UTC−3 (BRT)
- Postal code: 72960-000
- Website: www.corumbatur.com.br

Corumbá de Goiás is a municipality in central Goiás state, Brazil. It is one of the oldest cities in the state and still preserves vestiges of its colonial heritage. The Areias River passes through the municipality.

== Location and Geography ==
Located in the micro-region of Entorno do Distrito Federal, is linked by highways BR-070 and BR-414. Important distances are: 110 km to Goiânia, 45 km to Anápolis and 130 km to Brasília. Corumbá is bounded by the following municipalities: Pirenópolis, Cocalzinho de Goiás, Santo Antônio do Descoberto, Alexânia and Abadiânia.

Due to variations in elevation, temperatures are quite varied. The average is around 26 °C; The rains obey a tropical pattern and are at their strongest in the period of October to March.

The municipality contains part of the 2,833 hectares (7,000 acres) Pirineus State Park, created in 1987. Nature is the tourist attraction of the municipality. The region is full of waterfalls, caverns, and rivers. The Salto de Corumbá is known throughout the region and attracts many tourists from Brasília and Goiânia. The Corumbá River crosses the municipality and has beaches and rapids.

The town is one of the oldest in the state and still preserves part of the houses from past centuries, with special notice given to the Igreja Matriz de Nossa Senhora da Penha de França. Corumbá, like neighboring Pirenópolis, receives a great number of tourists for the Festival of the Cavalhadas, which are mock battles between Moors and Christians.

== History ==
The settlement of Corumbá de Goiás began in 1731 when miners looked for gold at the confluence of the Corumbá River and the Bagagem River. In 1734 a chapel was built honoring Nossa Senhora da Penha da França. In 1840 the town was already a parish with its first priest Manoel Inocêncio da Costa Campos. In 1849 it was raised to the status of "vila" (like a municipality today) only to lose this status in 1863, becoming a district of Meia Ponte, which is today called Pirenópolis. The Vila de Corumbá became a city in 1902 changing its name to Corumbá de Goiás because of the confusion with the more important Corumbá in Mato Grosso. Corumbá de Goiás had grown to 20,212 inhabitants in 1980 with 17,765 living in the rural area. Between 1991 and 1996 the population dropped 15% with the rural population being reduced to 4,109 inhabitants. The population continued to diminish gradually until stabilizing after 2000.

== Economy ==
The economy is poorly developed due to isolation and is based on rural agricultural production and tourism. There is some cattle raising (59,000 head in 2006) both for beef and for milk. In 2007 there were two financial institutions. There was one dairy: S. Teixeira Produtos Alimentícios Ltda. (22/05/2006).

Agricultural data 2006

- Farms: 841
- Total area: 55,844 ha.
- Area of permanent crops: 263 ha.
- Area of perennial crops: 3,895 ha.
- Area of natural pasture: 40,296 ha.
- Area of woodland and forests: 9,952 ha.
- Persons dependent on farming: 2,100
- Number of tractors: 158
- Cattle herd: 59,000
- Main crop: corn with 1,300 planted hectares producing 5,200 tons

== Health and education ==
- Schools: 22 with 2,413 students (2006)
- Hospitals: 02 with 29 beds (2007)
- Literacy rate (2000): 82%
- Infant mortality rate (2000): 24.45
- MHDI (2000): 0.716
- State ranking: 182 (out of 242 municipalities in 2000)
- National ranking: 2,701 (out of 5,507 municipalities in 2000)

== See also ==
- List of municipalities in Goiás
