= Santo Antônio do Descoberto =

- Municipality
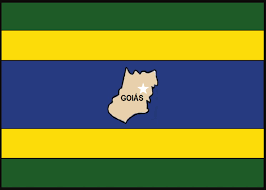
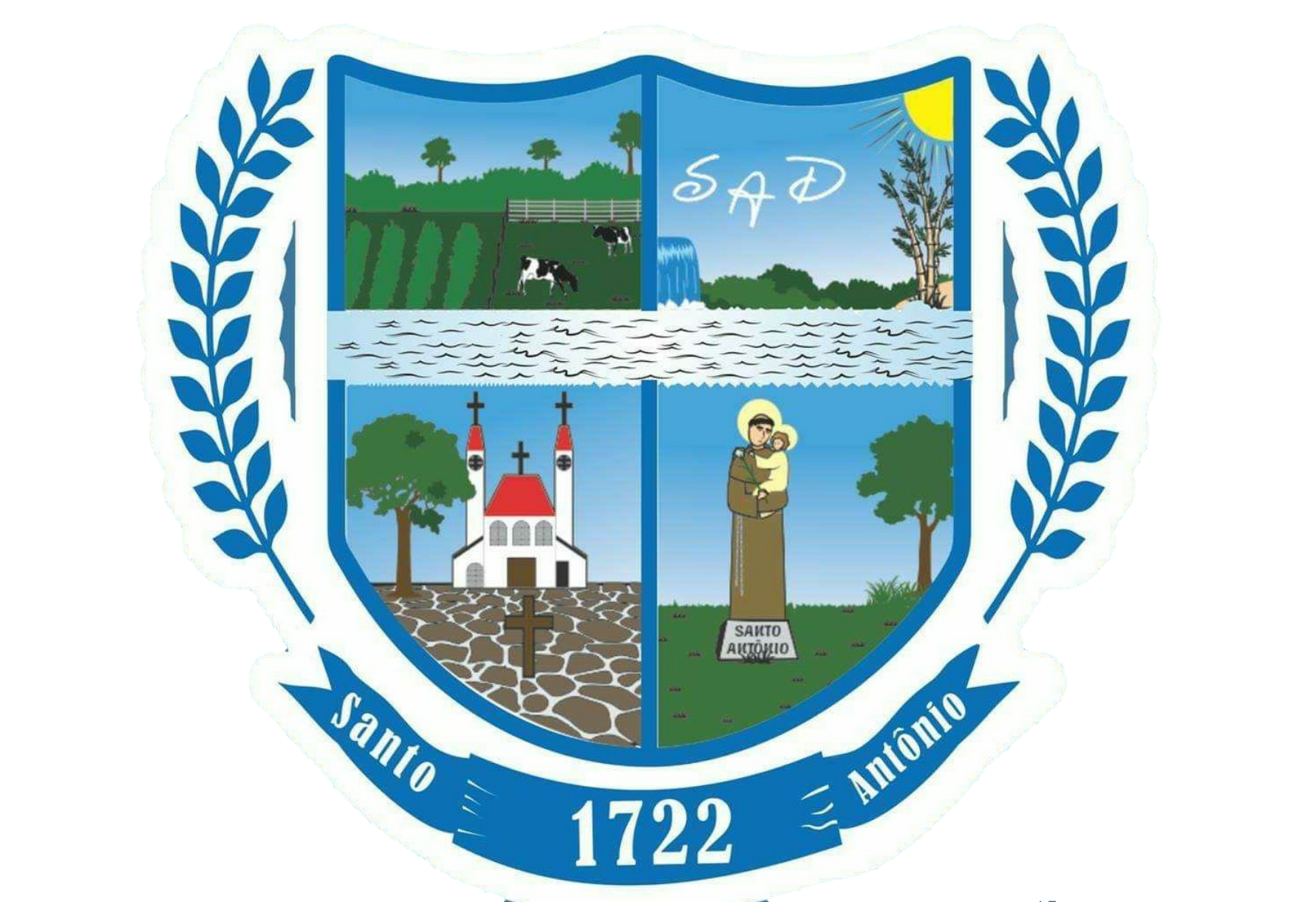
- Flag Coat of arms

- Location in Goiás state

- Location in Brazil
- Coordinates: 15°56′37″S 48°15′34″W
- Country: Brazil
- Region: Central-West
- State: Goiás
- Microregion: Entorno do Distrito Federal

Area
  - Total: 938.3 km^{2} (362.3 sq mi)
- Elevation: 912 m (2,992 ft)

Population (2020)
  - Total: 75,829
  - Density: 80.82/km^{2} (209.3/sq mi)
- Time zone: UTC−3 (BRT)
- Postal code: 72900-000

Santo Antônio do Descoberto is a municipality in central Goiás, Brazil.

== Location ==
Santo Antônio do Descoberto is located in the microregion called Entorno do Distrito Federal, the area of Goiás that surrounds the Federal District. It is 174 kilometers from the state capital, Goiânia.

Municipal boundaries are with:

- North: Águas Lindas de Goiás;
- South: Luziânia;
- West: Cocalzinho de Goiás, Corumbá de Goiás, and Alexânia;
- East: Federal District and Novo Gama.

== Economy ==
The economy is based on agriculture, cattle raising, services, public administration, and small transformation industries. There were 02 financial institutions in August 2007. The cattle herd had 31,000 head (2006) and the main crops planted were rice, sugarcane, beans, bananas, oranges, manioc, and corn (1,200 hectares 2006))

Agricultural data 2006

- Farms: 532
- Total area: 27,819 ha.
- Area of permanent crops: 1,203 ha.
- Area of perennial crops: 3,502 ha.
- Area of natural pasture: 15,906 ha.
- Area of woodland and forests: 9,580 ha.
- Persons dependent on farming: 1,450
- Number of tractors: 66 IBGE

== Health and education ==
- Higher education: Pólo Universitário da UEG.
- Adult literacy rate: 85.7% (2000) (national average was 86.4%)
- Hospitals: 2 with 77 beds (2007)
- Infant mortality rate: 26.65 (2000) (national average was 33.0)
- Human Development Index: 0.709 (2000)
- State ranking: 199 (out of 242 municipalities)
- National ranking: 2,843 (out of 5,507 municipalities) Frigoletto

== Tourism ==
The municipality attracts visitors to its waterfalls, caves and springs of crystal-clear water. Two of the water falls, lying 5 kilometers from the town, are surrounded by dense tropical vegetation, contrasting with the relatively dry cerrado nearby.

Ten kilometers from the town is Cidade Eclética, a nucleus of people who make up a universal fraternity, a spiritualist community founded by Oceano de Sá, known as Mestre Yokaanam.

The traditional festival of Santo Antônio do Descoberto is in homage to the patron saint and takes place on 13 June. It attracts thousands of pilgrims and followers of the saint and there are stands, processions and music.

== History ==
The history of European occupation of the region of Santo Antônio goes back to 1726 when, according to tradition, slaves belonging a Portuguese gold seeker sat down to rest and supposedly discovered an image of Santo Antônio in the branches of a tree. They took it to their master and a chapel was built in 1728. Soon the site became a place of pilgrimage attracting people from near and far. After a time the festivals disappeared and the town continued with the name of Santo Antônio de Montes Claros, district of Luziânia. In 1982 it got its emancipation and took the present name honoring the saint and the river that flows through the region.

== See also ==
- List of municipalities in Goiás
- Microregions of Goiás
