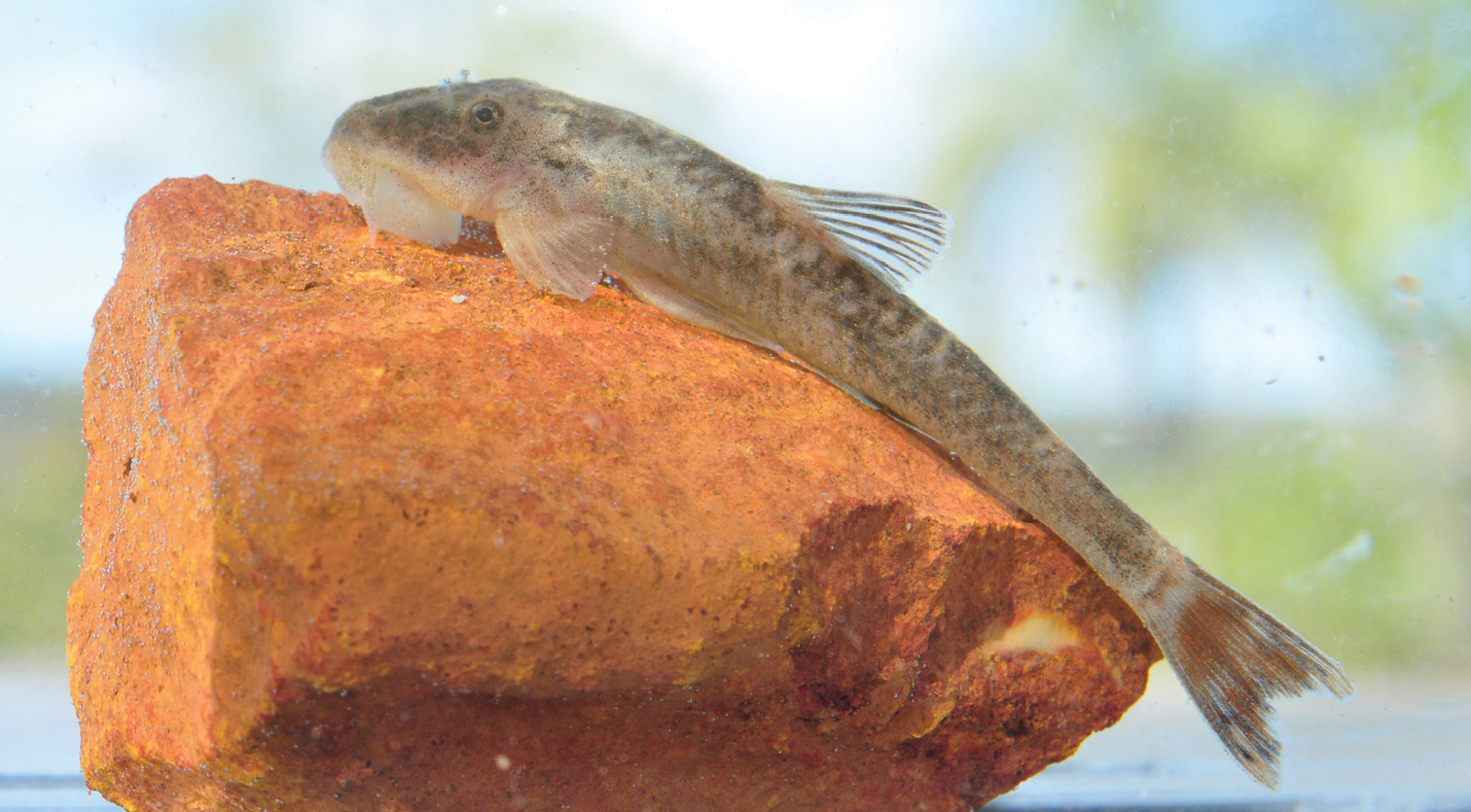
- Rhinolekos capetinga

Scientific classification
- Kingdom: Animalia
- Phylum: Chordata
- Class: Actinopterygii
- Order: Siluriformes
- Family: Loricariidae
- Subfamily: Hypoptopomatinae
- Genus: Rhinolekos; Martins & Langeani, 2011

Type species
- Rhinolekoa britskii Martins & Langeani, 2011

= Rhinolekos =

Genus of fishes

Rhinolekos is a genus of freshwater ray-finned fishes belonging to the family Loricariidae, the suckermouth armoured catfishes, and the subfamily Hypoptopomatinae, the cascudinhos. The catfishes in this genus are endemic to Brazil.

== Taxonomy ==
Rhinolekos was first formally proposed as a genus in 2011 by the Brazian ichthyologists Fernanda de Oliveira Martins and Francisco Langeani-Neto in 2011, Martins and Langeani described three new species in the new genus and they designated R. britski as the type species. The type locality of the type species was given as Bela Vista de Goiás, a tributary of the Arapuca stream, Fazenda Arapuca, in the Paranaíba River drainage at 17°04'06"S, 48°43'59"W in the Brazilian state of Goiás. Eschmeyer's Catalog of Fishes classified the genus Pseudotocinclus in the subfamily Hypoptopomatinae, the cascudinhos, within the suckermouth armored catfish family Loricariidae.

== Etymology ==
Rhinolekos combines rhinos, which is the genitive of rhis, meaning "beak" or "snout", with lekos, a "dish", "pot" or "pan", an allusion to the large plate located between second infraorbital plate and nostrils, projected forward and surrounding the nares.

== Species ==
Rhinolekos contains the following valid species:

- Rhinolekos britskii Martins, Langeani & F. C. Costa, 2011
- Rhinolekos capetinga Roxo, Ochoa, G. S. C. Silva & Oliveira, 2015
- Rhinolekos garavelloi Martins & Langeani, 2011
- Rhinolekos schaeferi Martins & Langeani, 2011

== Characteristics ==
Rhinolekos catfishes share the following characteristics which in combination separate them from related genera. The front part of the compound supraneural of the dorsal fin is touching the neural spine of the 9th or 10th vertebra; they lack a plate on the sides of the nose; there is a plate in the middle of the snout; juveniles possess a slit in the axillary of the pectoral fin; the median plate series is continuous until it reaches the nbase of the caudal fin; there is an operculum in the iris; there is a plate below the eye; the upper and lower surfaces of the snout have odontodes which are of a similar size to those present on the rest of the head; the caudal peduncle has a nearly round cross section; and some skeletal features are shared. These are small catfishes with standard lengths no greater than 4 cm (1.6 in).

== Distribution ==
Rhinolekos catfishes are endemic to central Brazil where they occur in the Parnaiba and Tocantins River drainages.
