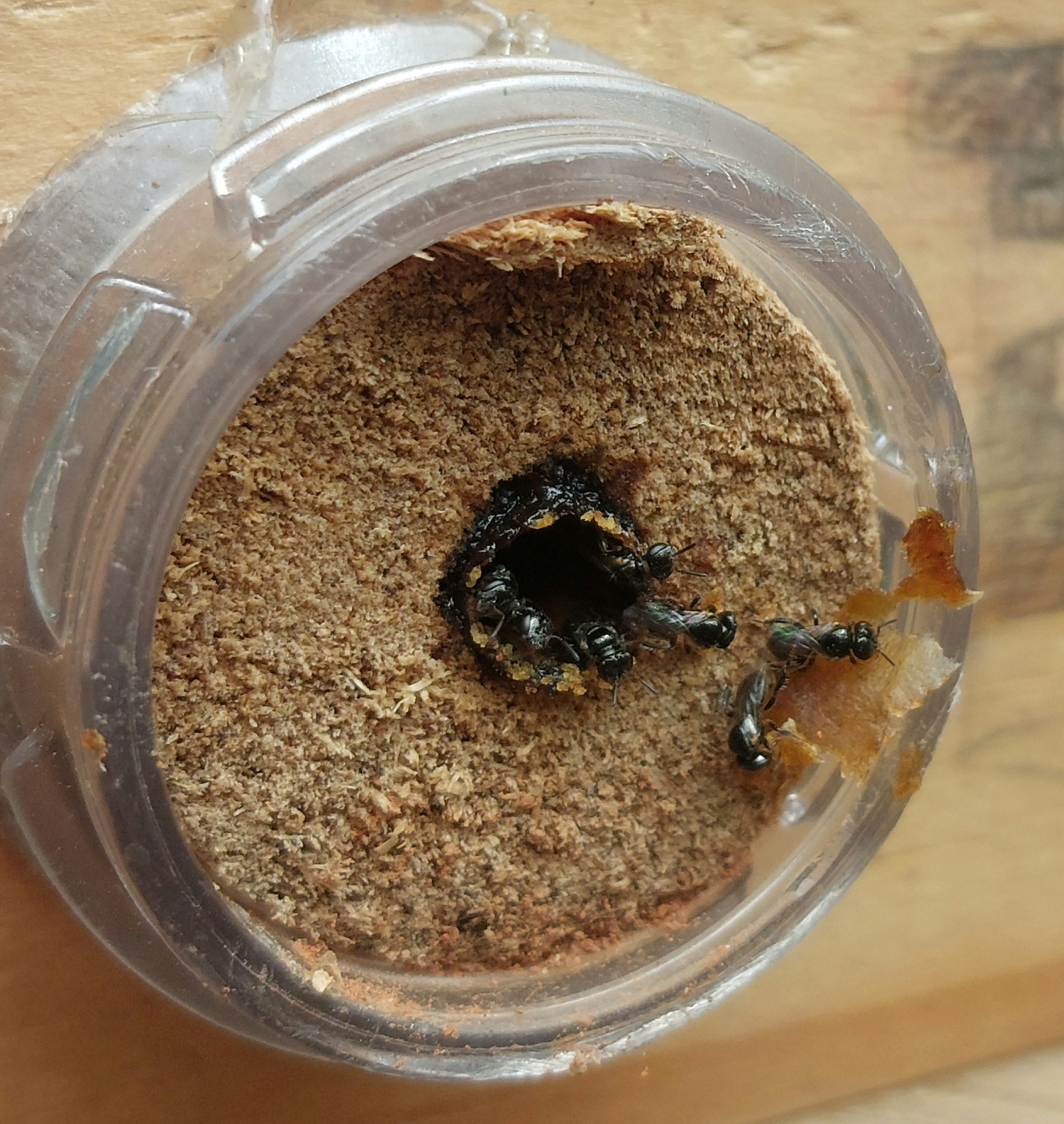
- Leurotrigona muelleri

Scientific classification
- Kingdom: Animalia
- Phylum: Arthropoda
- Class: Insecta
- Order: Hymenoptera
- Family: Apidae
- Tribe: Meliponini
- Genus: Leurotrigona; Moure, 1950

= Leurotrigona =

Genus of bees

Leurotrigona is a genus of stingless bees in the tribe Meliponini, first described by Jesus Santiago Moure in 1950. It comprises small-bodied species, commonly referred to as “mirim bees”, and locally known in Portuguese as “lambe-olhos”.

The genus Leurotrigona Moure, 1950 occurs in the Neotropical region, mainly in Brazil (widespread across multiple states), Colombia, Peru, French Guiana, and Paraguay.

Species:

- Leurotrigona crispula Pedro & Camargo, 2009
- Leurotrigona gracilis Pedro & Camargo, 2009
- Leurotrigona muelleri (Friese, 1900)
- Leurotrigona pusilla Moure & Camargo, 1988
