= Barra do Mendes =

Municipality of Bahia State, Brazil

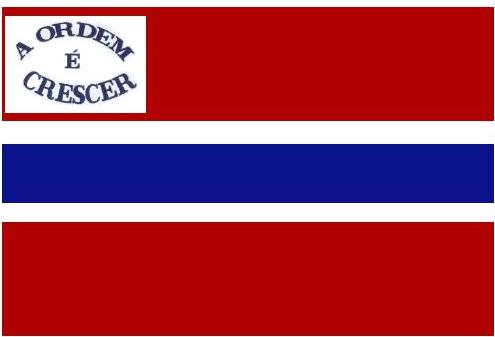
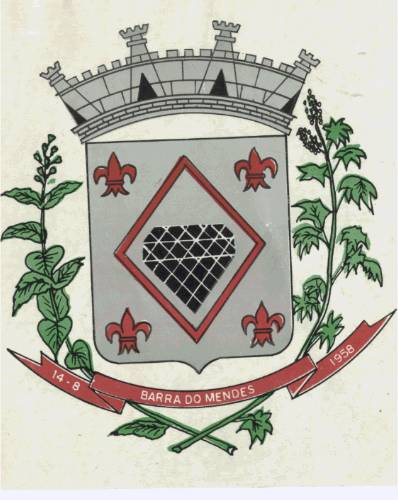
- Flag Coat of arms

- Coordinates: 11°48′36″S 42°03′32″W
- State: Bahia
- Founded: 21 July 1917
- Incorporated: 14 August 1958
- Elevation: 121 m (397 ft)

Population (2020)
  - Total: 13,833
- Time zone: UTC−3 (BRT)
- Postal code: 2903003

Barra do Mendes is a municipality in the state of Bahia in the North-East region of Brazil.

== Notable people ==
- Lázaro Barbosa de Sousa — Serial killer

== See also ==
- List of municipalities in Bahia
