= Microregion of Entorno do Distrito Federal =

Coordinates: 15°45′43″S 48°16′55″W

Entorno do Distrito Federal
- Microregion
- Location in Goias state
- Country: Brazil
- State: Goiás
- Mesoregion: Leste Goiano
- Municipalities: 20

Area
  - Total: 38,212.00 km^{2} (14,753.74 sq mi)

Population (2007)
  - Total: 960,141
  - Density: 25.1267/km^{2} (65.0778/sq mi)

Entorno do Distrito Federal Microregion (also: Entorno de Brasília) is a statistical microregion in Goiás state, Brazil, consisting of municipalities located in the vicinity of the Federal District of Brazil.

== Municipalities ==
The microregion consists of the following municipalities:

Name	Population (2007)
Abadiânia	12,640
Água Fria de Goiás	5,008
Águas Lindas de Goiás	131,884
Alexânia	20,033
Cabeceiras	6,610
Cidade Ocidental	48,589
Cocalzinho de Goiás	14,762
Corumbá de Goiás	9,190
Cristalina	36,614
Formosa	90,212
Luziânia	196,046
Mimoso de Goiás	2,836
Novo Gama	83,599
Padre Bernardo	25,969
Pirenópolis	20,460
Planaltina	76,376
Santo Antônio do Descoberto	55,621
Valparaíso de Goiás	114,450
Vila Boa	4,198
Vila Propício	5,044
