= Cocalzinho de Goiás =

- Municipality
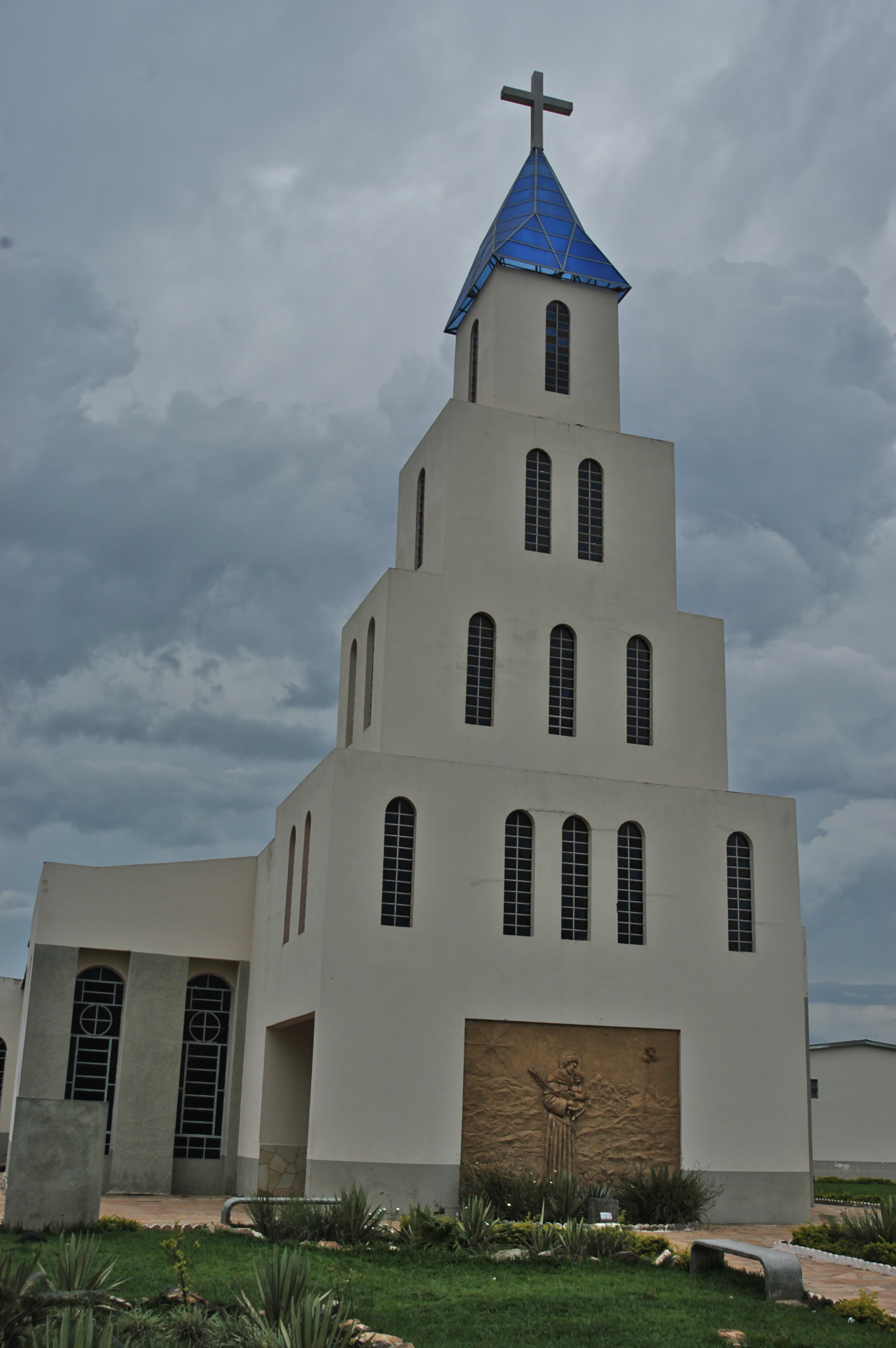

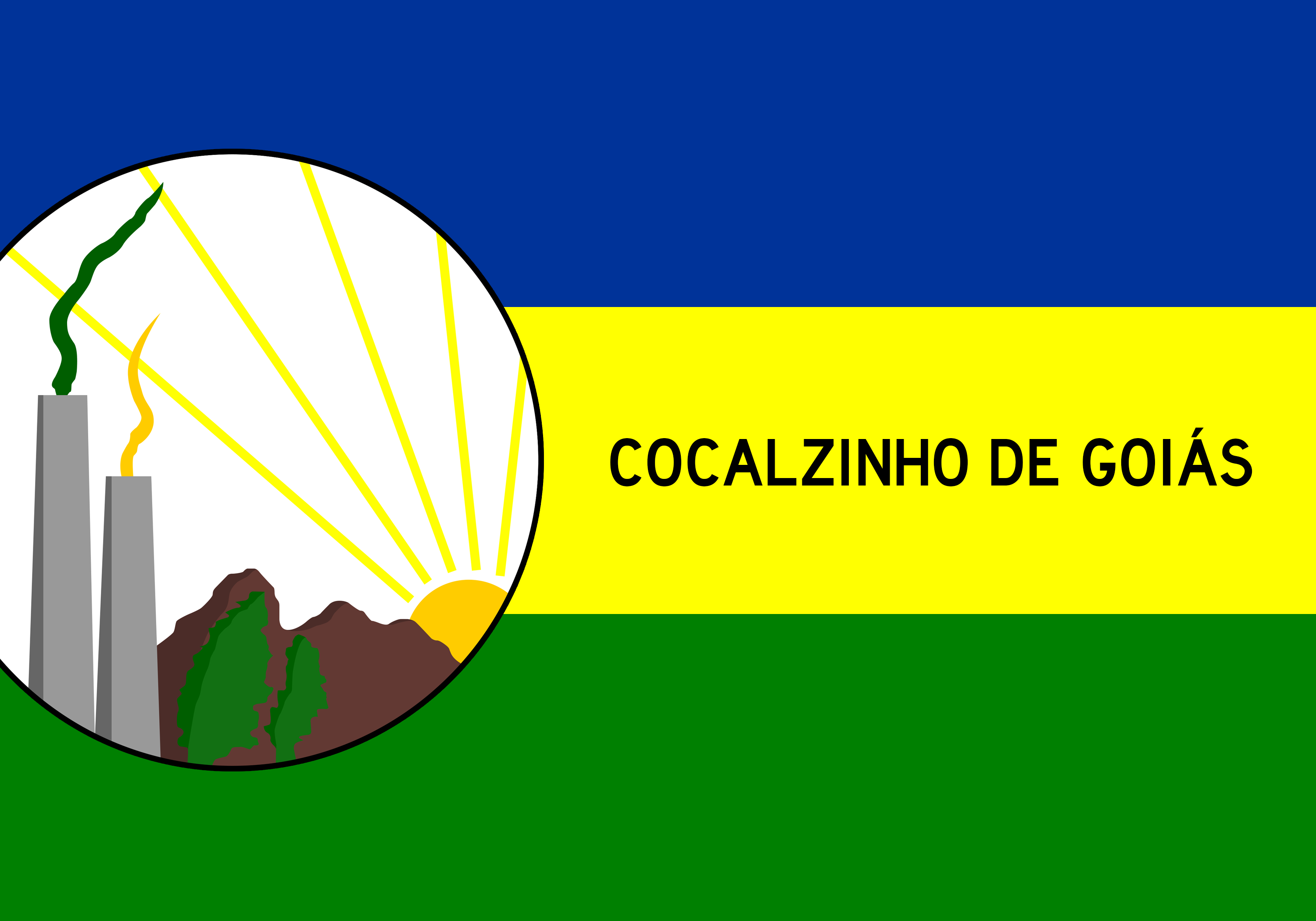
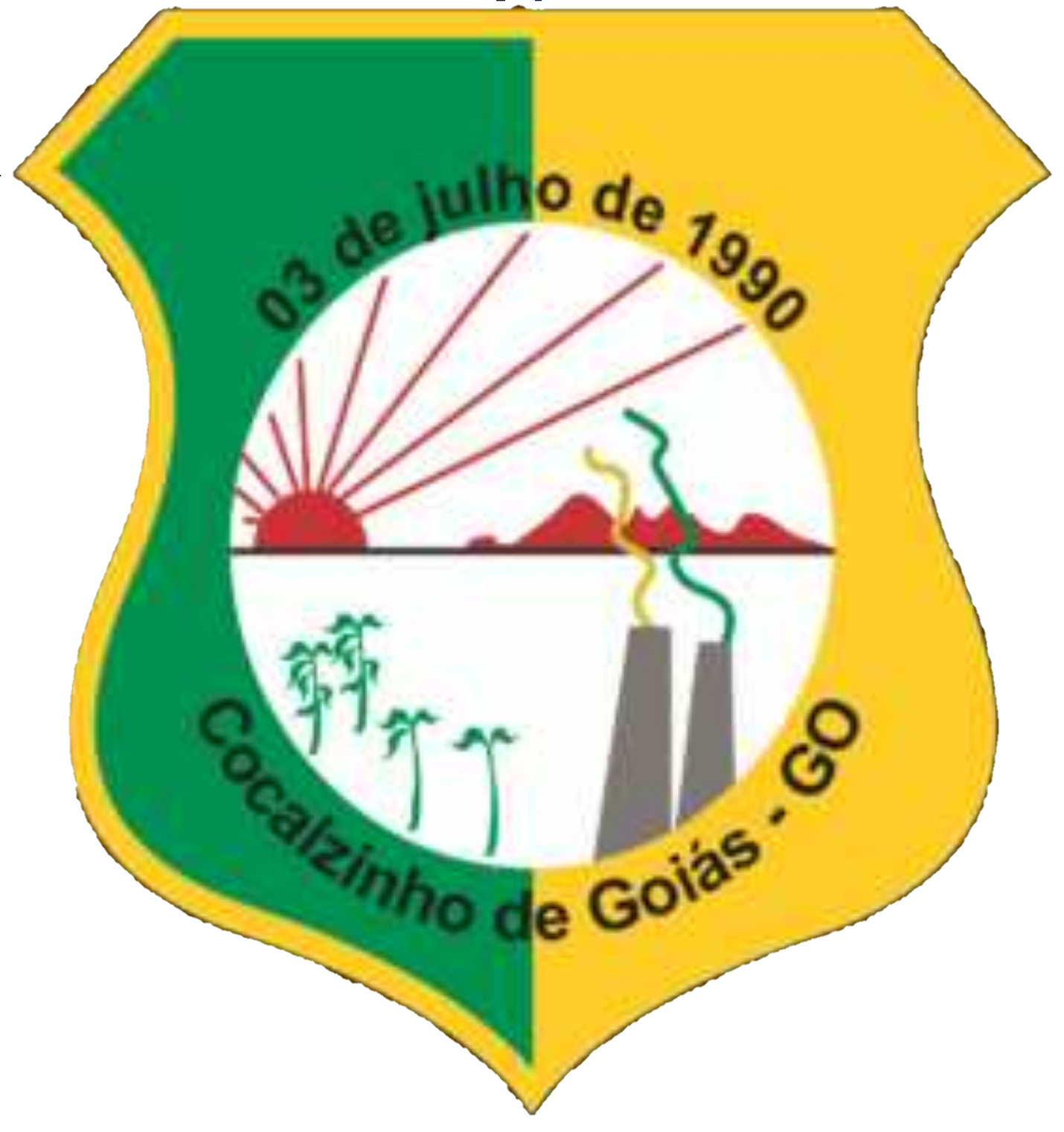
- Flag Coat of arms

- Location in Goiás state

- Location in Brazil
- Coordinates: 15°47′40″S 48°36′34″W
- Country: Brazil
- Region: Central-West
- State: Goiás
- Microregion: Entorno do Distrito Federal

Area
  - Total: 1,787.9 km^{2} (690.3 sq mi)
- Elevation: 1,152 m (3,780 ft)

Population (2020)
  - Total: 20,504
  - Density: 11.468/km^{2} (29.703/sq mi)
- Time zone: UTC−3 (BRT)
- Postal code: 72975-000

Cocalzinho de Goiás is a municipality in central Goiás state, Brazil.

== Location and geography ==
Cocalzinho, as it is known by the inhabitants, is located in the micro-region of Entorno do Distrito Federal, on highway BR-414, almost at the junction with highway BR-070. It is 132 kilometers from the state capital, Goiânia and is 127 km from the national capital, Brasília.

Municipal boundaries are with:

- North: Padre Bernardo and Vila Propício
- South: Corumbá de Goiás
- East: Santo Antônio do Descoberto and Águas Lindas de Goiás
- West: Pirenópolis

The elevation varies between 800 and 1,200 meters. Geographical relief is very irregular since the region is crossed by the Continental Divider of Waters, which separates the river basins of the Amazon and the Plata. Therefore, there are numerous springs that grow until they form the major rivers of South America. For this reason it is called the Berço das Águas (the Cradle of Waters). Major rivers are: Rio Verde, Oliveira Costa, Jacaré, Piqui, Taquaral, Corumbá, and Areias. There are many waterfalls and swimming spots. Nearby in neighboring Corumbá de Goiás there is a cavern called Gruta dos Ecos, with one of the largest subterranean lakes in South America.

The municipality contains part of the 2,833 hectares (7,000 acres) Pirineus State Park, created in 1987. This contains Pico dos Pireneus, the highest point in the region, with an elevation of 1,385 meters.

== History ==
Cocalzinho began in 1960 with the arrival of a cement plant, Companhia de Cimento Portland Itaú, which closed down in 1996 putting five thousand families out of work. Since then the local population has either left for better opportunities or continued working in agriculture. Today the economy is based on agriculture, cattle raising, dairy industries and rock quarries. The area is rich in sand and decorative rock.

The name "Cocalzinho" comes from a stream called Cocá or Cocal, which has its source near the seat of the municipality.

When highway BR-414 is paved up to Niquelândia, Cocalzinho will benefit from tourism since there will be a tourist route from the Serra da Mesa lake to the Chapada dos Veadeiros national park.

== Economy ==
The main economic activities were cattle raising (76,000 cattles in 2006), poultry raising, and agriculture (cotton, corn, and soybeans).

Agricultural data from 2006:

- Farms: 603
- Total area: 75,013 ha.
- Area of permanent crops: 442 ha.
- Area of perennial crops: 7,883 ha.
- Area of natural pasture: 54,373 ha.
- Area of woodland and forests: 29,307 ha.
- Persons dependent on farming: 1,475
- Number of tractors: 172
- Cattle herd: 76,000
- Main crop: soybeans producing 16,200 tons on 6,000 hectares

== Health and education ==
- Schools: 16
- Higher education: none in 2007
- Literacy rate (2000): 82.3%
- Infant mortality rate (2000): 23.61%
- Hospitals: 01 with 21 beds (2007)
- HDI-M (2000): 0.703
- State ranking: 207 (out of 242 municipalities in 2000)
- National ranking: 2935 (out of 5507 municipalities in 2000)

== See also ==
- List of municipalities in Goiás
- Microregions of Goiás
