= Padre Bernardo =

- Municipality
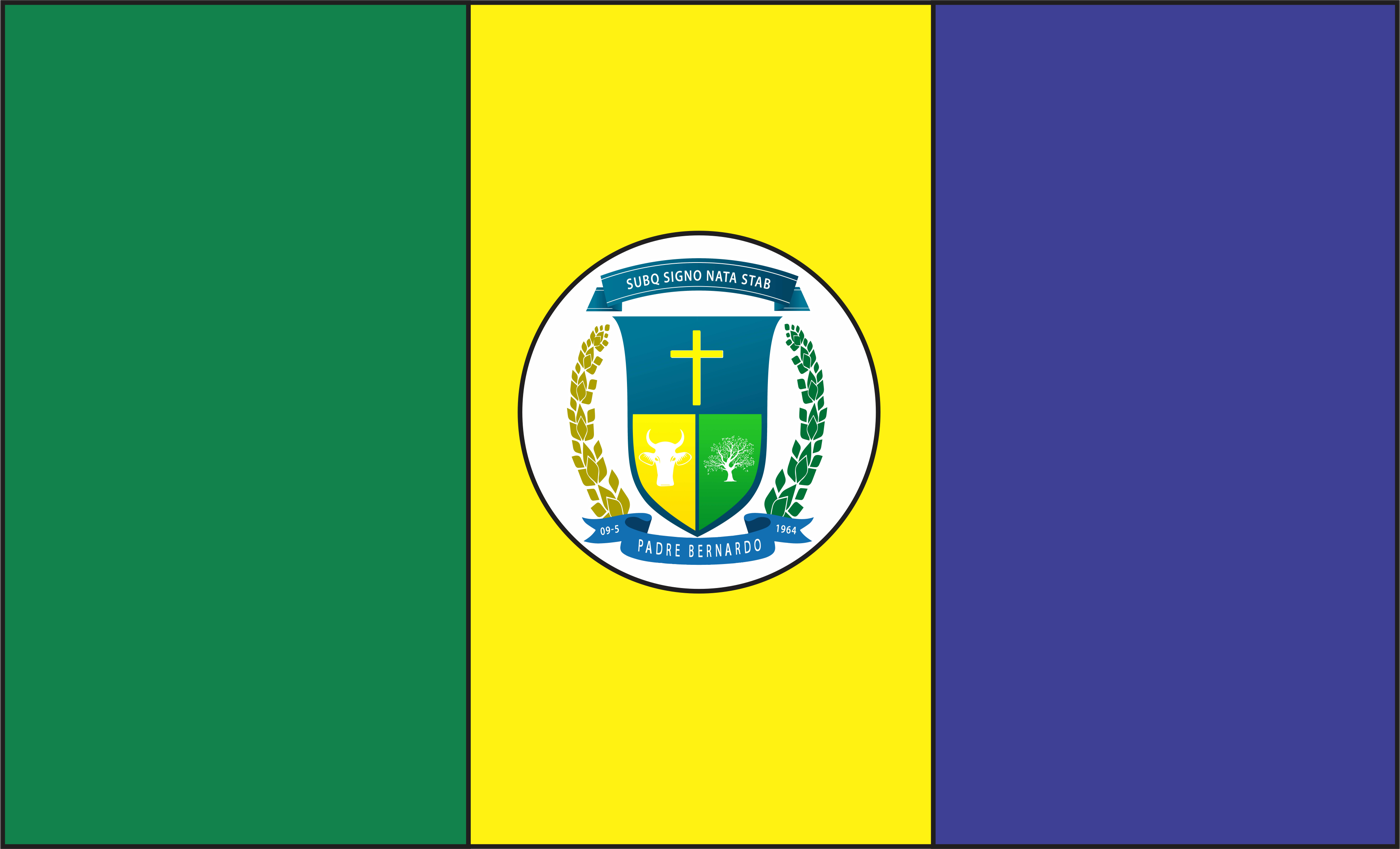
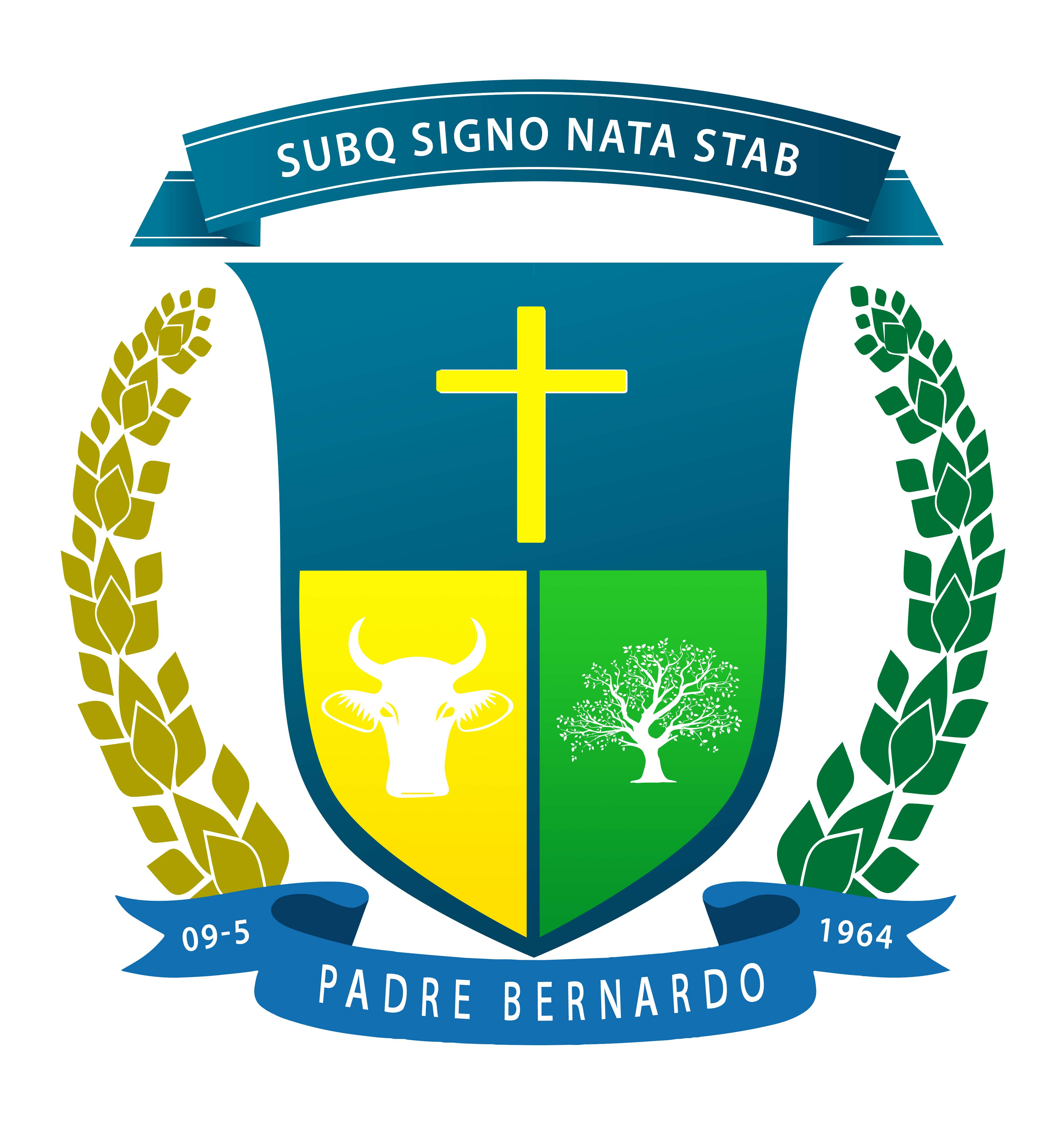
- Flag Coat of arms

- Location in Goiás state

- Location in Brazil
- Coordinates: 15°9′55.685″S 48°17′24.968″W
- Country: Brazil
- Region: Central-West
- State: Goiás
- Microregion: Entorno do Distrito Federal

Area
  - Total: 3,137.9 km^{2} (1,211.5 sq mi)
- Elevation: 629 m (2,064 ft)

Population (2020)
  - Total: 34,430
  - Density: 10.97/km^{2} (28.42/sq mi)
- Time zone: UTC−3 (BRT)
- Postal code: 73700-000
- Website: https://www.padrebernardo.go.gov.br/

Padre Bernardo is a municipality located in the state of Goiás, Brazil.

== Location ==
Padre Bernardo is located 42 km north of the boundary with the Federal District. It has boundaries with the following municipalities:

- North: Mimoso de Goiás
- South: Cocalzinho de Goiás
- East: Planaltina de Goiás
- West: Vila Propício

== The Economy ==
The main economic activities are cattle raising and growing of corn and soybeans. Local commerce, with restaurants, bars, clothing and shoe shops, banks, supermarkets, among others, supply the basic necessities of the population. There are small industries of brick making, milk produces and clothing manufacturing. The largest employer in the town was the government. There were 02 bank branches in August 2007.

In 2006 there were 137,000 head of cattle. The main agricultural products were rice, bananas, sugarcane, beans, coconuts, oranges, lemons, manioc, corn, and soybeans (11,000 hectares in 2006). Seplan

Agricultural data 2006

- Farms: 1,113
- Total area: 198,109 ha.
- Area of permanent crops: 1,462 ha.
- Area of perennial crops: 31,490 ha.
- Area of natural pasture: 124,040 ha.
- Area of woodland and forests: 35,582 ha.
- Persons dependent on farming: 3,400
- Number of tractors: 318
- Cattle herd: 137,000 IBGE

== Health and Education ==
In 2006 there were 26 schools with 8,495 students enrolled. The literacy rate was 82.6% in 2000. In 2007 there was 01 hospital with 27 beds. The infant mortality rate was 30.06% in 2000. The Municipal Human Development Index rating was 0.705 in 2000. Seplan

- State ranking: 204 (out of 242 municipalities)
- National ranking: 2,909 (out of 5,507 municipalities) For the complete list see Frigoletto.com

== See also ==
- List of municipalities in Goiás
