= Mimoso de Goiás =

- Municipality
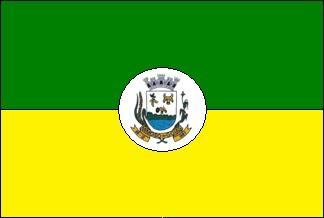
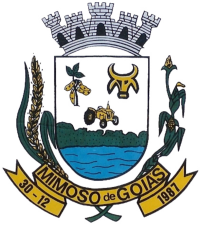
- Flag Coat of arms

- Location in Goiás state

- Location in Brazil
- Coordinates: 15°03′53″S 48°09′30″W
- Country: Brazil
- Region: Central-West
- State: Goiás
- Microregion: Entorno do Distrito Federal

Area
  - Total: 1,386.9 km^{2} (535.5 sq mi)
- Elevation: 675 m (2,215 ft)

Population (2020)
  - Total: 2,583
  - Density: 1.862/km^{2} (4.824/sq mi)
- Time zone: UTC−3 (BRT)
- Postal code: 73730-000

Mimoso de Goiás is a municipality in northeastern Goiás state, Brazil.

Mimoso is located in statistical microregion 012, called Entorno do Distrito Federal. It is almost directly north of Federal District and is on an unpaved highway linking Padre Bernardo to Água Fria de Goiás. Municipal boundaries are with:

- north: Niquelândia
- west: Vila Propício and Planaltina de Goiás
- east: Água Fria de Goiás
- south: Padre Bernardo

The economy is based on cattle raising, services consisting of shops selling the basic necessities, government employment, and subsistence farming. There are some larger plantations of soybeans, corn, and beans.

In 2006 there were 55,000 head of cows, with most of them being for meat production. The main agricultural products in planted area were cotton, rice, sugarcane, beans, manioc, corn, and soybeans (3,700 hectares). Only the last had a planted area exceeding 500 hectares. A recent agricultural product is the pupunha (Bactris Gasipaes Kunth), a type of palm from which is extracted oil and flour. Also see Palmitoseloverde

The ranking on the 2000 Human Development Index was 0.664

- State ranking: 229 (out of 242 municipalities in 2000)
- National ranking: 3,548 (out of 5,507 municipalities in 2000)
- Schools: 11 with 1,070 students (2006)
- Hospitals: none (2007)
- Literacy rate: 75.3% (2000)
- Infant mortality rate: 27.83 (2000)

Mimoso was created as a district of Niquelândia in 1951. In 1975 it was transferred to the municipality of Padre Bernardo. In 1987 it was dismembered from Padre Bernardo and elevated to a municipality, which was installed in 1989.

== See also ==
- List of municipalities in Goiás
