= São Gabriel, Bahia =

Coordinates: 11°13′44″S 41°54′43″W

- Municipality
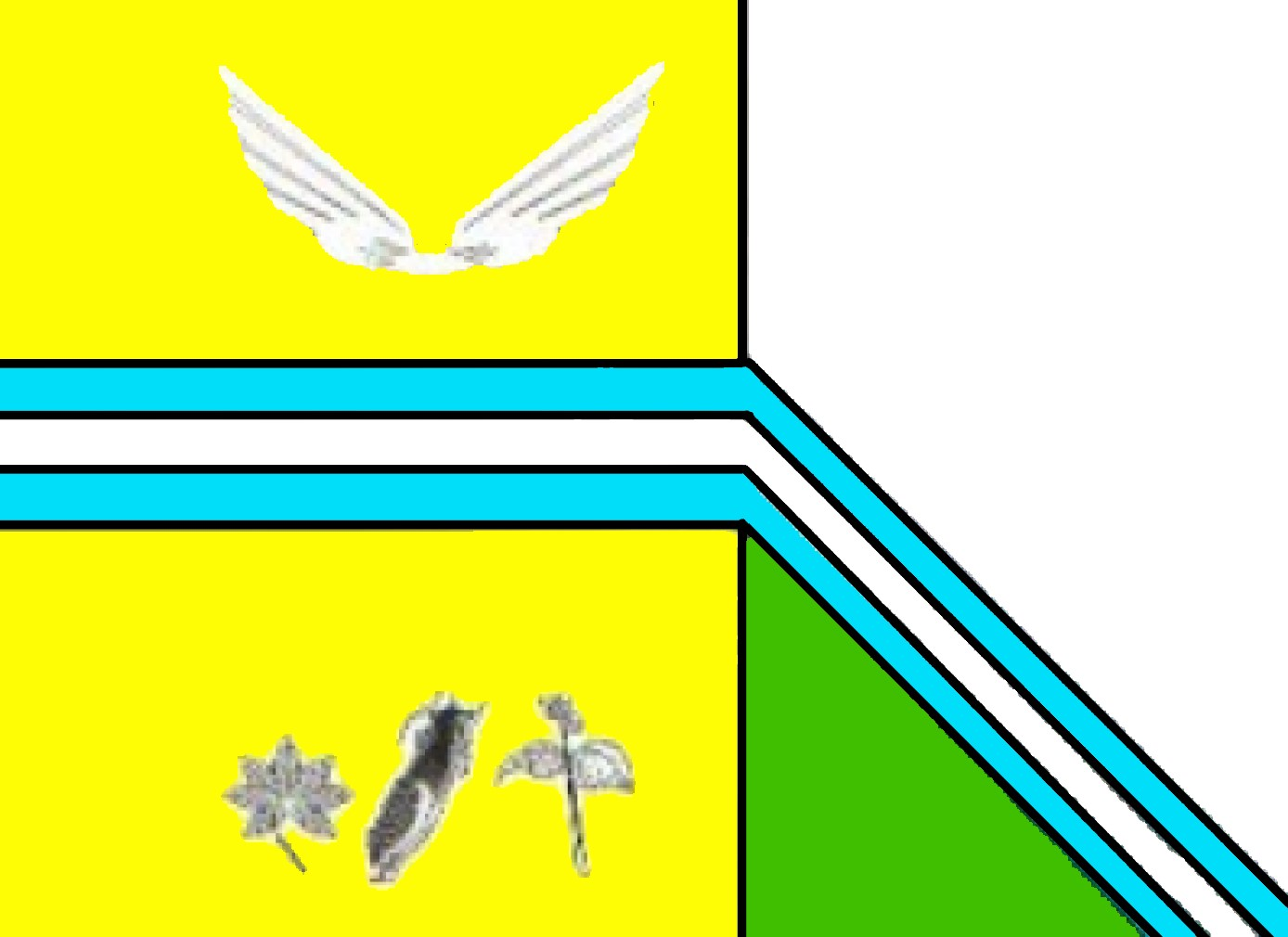
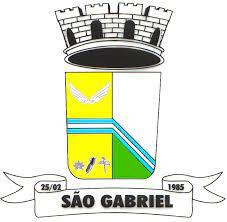
- Flag Coat of arms
- Interactive map of São Gabriel, Bahia
- Country: Brazil
- Region: Nordeste
- State: Bahia

Population (2020)
  - Total: 18,789
- Time zone: UTC−3 (BRT)

São Gabriel, Bahia is a municipality in the state of Bahia in the North-East region of Brazil.

== See also ==
- List of municipalities in Bahia
