= Rhinolekos garavelloi =

Conservation status
- Least Concern (IUCN 3.1)

Scientific classification
- Kingdom: Animalia
- Phylum: Chordata
- Class: Actinopterygii
- Order: Siluriformes
- Family: Loricariidae
- Genus: Rhinolekos
- Species: R. garavelloi

Binomial name
- Rhinolekos garavelloi Martins & Langeani, 2011

Species of catfish

Rhinolekos garavelloi is a species of freshwater ray-finned fish belonging to the family Loricariidae, the suckermouth armoured catfishes, and the subfamily Hypoptopomatinae, the cascudinhos. This catfish is endemic to Brazil.

== Taxonomy ==
Rhinolekos garavelloi was first formally described in 2011 by the Brazilian ichthyologists Fernanda de Oliveira Martins and Francisco Langeani with its type locality given as stream at Fazenda Lageado, near road GO-213, after the Corumbá River bridge, at Caldas Novas in the Paranaíba River drainage at 17°44'20"S, 48°28'27"W in the Brazilian state of Goiás. Eschmeyer's Catalog of Fishes classified the genus Pseudotocinclus in the subfamily Hypoptopomatinae, the cascudinhos, within the suckermouth armored catfish family Loricariidae.

== Etymology ==
Rhinolekos garavelloi is the classified within the genus Rhinolekos, this name combines rhinos, which is the genitive of rhis, meaning "beak" or "snout", with lekos, a "dish", "pot" or "pan", an allusion to the large plate located between second infraorbital plate and nostrils, projected forward and surrounding the nares. The specific name honours the Brazilian ichthyologist Julio C. Garavello in recognition of his work on the cascudinhos and his contributions to Neotropical ichthyology.

== Description ==
Rhinolekos garavelloi has its dorsal fin supported by 8 or 9 soft rays while its anal fin contains between 4 and 6 soft rays. It can be told apart from the other Rhinolekos species by the absence of transverse dark bands on the rays of the pectoral, pelvic and anal fins. This species has between 30 and 35 plates in the dorsal row and it has 32 vertebrae. There are no accessory teeth on the premaxilla and dentary. This species has an elongated body and it reaches a standard length of 3.6 cm (1.4 in).

== Distribution and habitat ==
Rhinolekos garavelloi is endemic to Brazil where its distribution is restricted to the Paranaíba River basin, in the upper Paraná River system. It has been recorded from a few localities near Caldas Novas, in tributaries of the Corumbá River.
