= Águas Lindas de Goiás =

- Municipality
- Municipality of Águas Lindas de Goiás
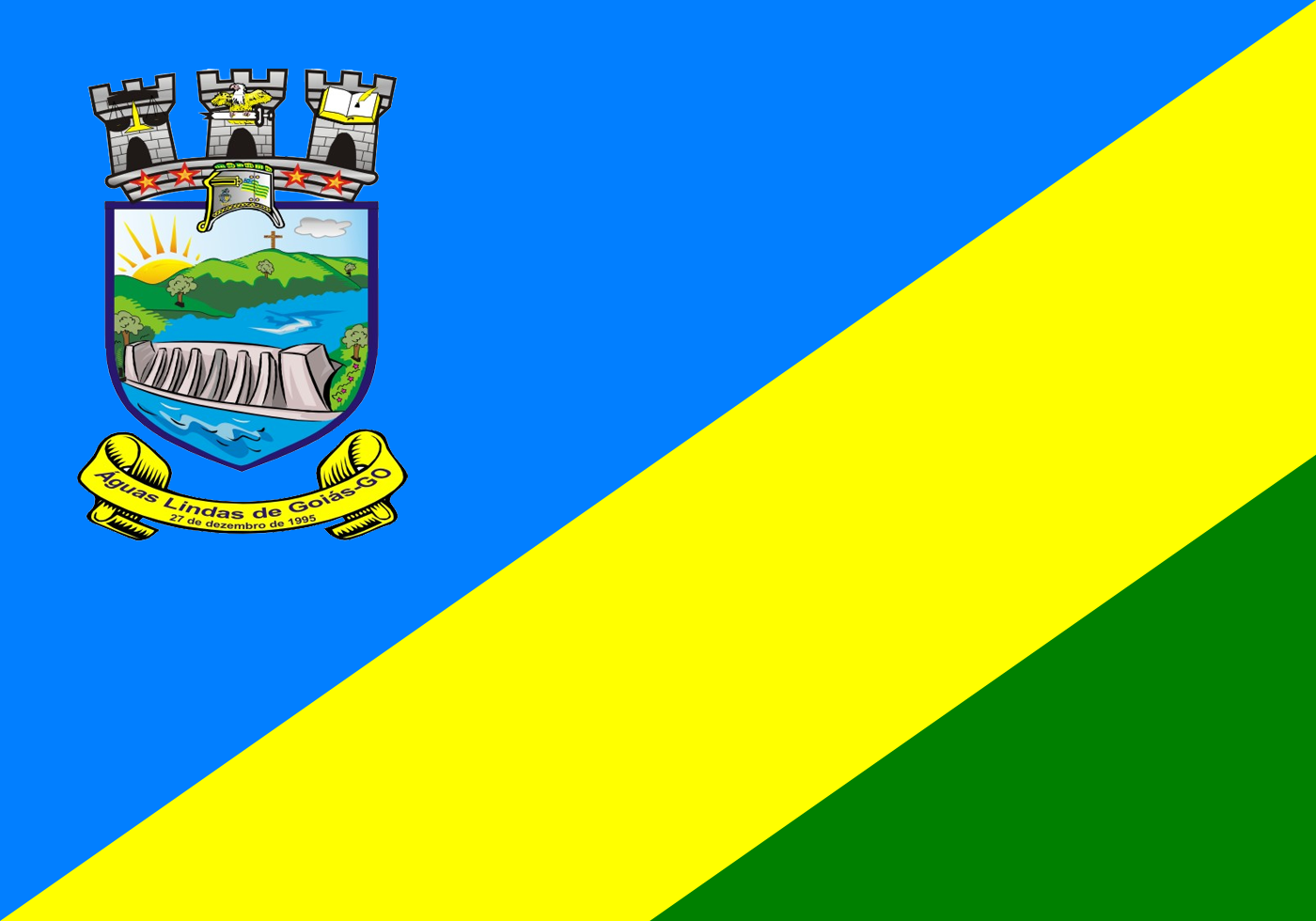
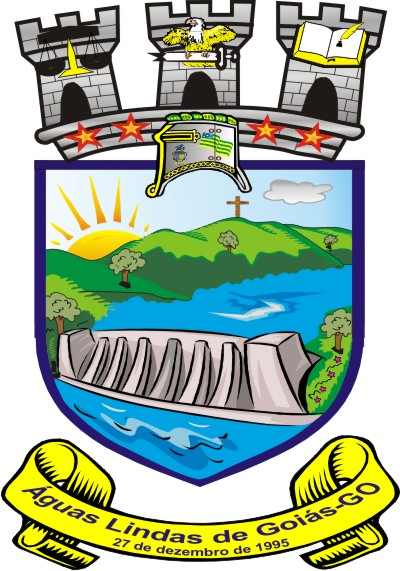
- Flag Coat of arms

- Location of Goiânia

- Location in Brazil
- Coordinates: 15°45′16″S 48°16′55″W
- Country: Brazil
- Region: Central-West
- State: Goiás
- City Established: December 27, 1995

Government
  - Mayor: Lucas de Carvalho Antonietti (PODE)

Area
  - Total: 191.18 km^{2} (73.82 sq mi)
- Elevation: 1,100 m (3,600 ft)

Population (2022 Brazilian census)
  - Total: 225,693
  - Estimate (2025): 245,352
  - Density: 1,180.5/km^{2} (3,057.5/sq mi)
- Demonym: aguas lindense
- Time zone: UTC−3 (BRT)
- Postal Code: 72910-000

Águas Lindas de Goiás is a municipality located in central Goiás, Brazil. It is the fifth largest city in the state and one of the fastest-growing cities in Brazil.

== Geography ==
=== Location ===
Águas Lindas is 193 km. from the state capital of Goiânia. Highway connections with Goiânia are made by BR-153 / Anápolis / BR-414 / Cocalzinho de Goiás / BR-070. For the complete list see It has borders with Santo Antônio do Descoberto, Cocalzinho de Goiás, and Brasília. It is located west of Brasília and borders on the boundary of the Federal District. It is part of the Entorno do Distrito Federal micro-region, which has over 960,000 inhabitants.

== Demographics ==
- Population: 245,352 (IBGE 2025)
- Population in 2000: 105,746
- Population density: 846.02 inhabitants/km^{2} (2017)
- Urban and Rural Population: 131,541 / 343
- Population growth rate 2000/2007: 3.21%

== Economy ==
The city has no major industries but has a variety of small commercial enterprises ranging from small offices, bars, grocery stores and larger supermarkets. Small industries manufacture furniture, sewage pipes, bicycles, sweets and toys. The informal economy is very strong and many people have stalls in fairs either in the city or in neighboring cities.

- Industrial establishments: 62
- Commercial retail establishments: 686
- Financial institutions: Banco Itaú SA (2), Banco do Brasil S.A., Caixa Econômica Federal

Due to the small territory and the urban characteristics there were no agricultural products registered with the IBGE.

The existence of Águas Lindas is recent, being dismembered in 1997 from the municipality of Santo Antônio do Descoberto. In 1996 the population of what was just a district was already 61,478. By 2000 it had increased to 105,000.

Its only reason for existence is Brasília and the need for lower class and lower middle class residents of that city or migrants from rural areas to find affordable housing. The infrastructures are precarious as evidenced by the existence of only one hospital for a city of over 100,000 people, only four bank branches, and only one post office. The per capita income is low and most of the inhabitants take buses every day to work in Brasília.

- Schools: 74
- Teachers: 1,030
- Students: 43,150
- Higher education: Faculdade Brasil Central - FBC; Universidade Estadual de Goiás - UEG.
- Hospitals: 1 (2007)
- Hospital beds: 68
- Infant mortality rate: 18.19 (2014)
- Literacy rate: 88.1 (2000)
- Municipal Human Development Index in 2014: 0.686
- National ranking: 2282 (out of 5565 municipalities)

== See also ==
- List of municipalities in Goiás
- Microregions of Goiás
