= List of quilombola communities in Goiás =

The following is a list of quilombola communities in Goiás as designated by the Palmares Cultural Foundation and awarded land title by the Instituto Nacional de Colonização e Reforma Agrária through the provisions of the 1988 Constitution. In addition, this list may include territories which received title through state-level agricultural reform agencies. This is not to be confused with the larger list of quilombola communities throughout Brazil, most of which are designated by the Palmares Cultural Foundation but not awarded land title by INCRA or equivalent state agencies.

== List of communities ==
| Region | State | Municipality | Quilombola community |
|---|---|---|---|
| Central-West | GO | Abadia de Goiás | Recantos Dourados |
| Central-West | GO | Alto Paraíso | Povoado Moinho |
| Central-West | GO | Aparecida de Goiânia | Jardim Cascata |
| Central-West | GO | Barro Alto | Antônio Borges |
| Central-West | GO | Barro Alto | Fazenda Santo Antônio da Laguna |
| Central-West | GO | Barro Alto, Santa Rita do Novo Destino | Tomás Cardoso |
| Central-West | GO | Cachoeira Dourada | Córrego do Inhambú |
| Central-West | GO | Caiapônia | Cristininha |
| Central-West | GO | Campos Belos | Brejão |
| Central-West | GO | Campos Belos | Taquarussu |
| Central-West | GO | Cavalcante | Capela |
| Central-West | GO | Cavalcante | Dos Morros |
| Central-West | GO | Cavalcante | São Domingos |
| Central-West | GO | Cavalcante, Monte Alegre de Goiás, Teresina de Goiás | Kalunga |
| Central-West | GO | Cidade Ocidental | Mesquita |
| Central-West | GO | Colinas do Sul | José de Coleto |
| Central-West | GO | Corumbá de Goiás | Vale do Rio Corumbá |
| Central-West | GO | Cristalina | Inocêncio Pereira de Oliveira |
| Central-West | GO | Cromínia | Nossa Senhora Aparecida |
| Central-West | GO | Divinópolis de Goiás | Vazante |
| Central-West | GO | Faina | Água Limpa |
| Central-West | GO | Flores de Goiás | Flores Velha |
| Central-West | GO | Goianésia | Valdemar de Oliveira |
| Central-West | GO | Goiás | Alto Santana |
| Central-West | GO | Iaciara | Extrema |
| Central-West | GO | Iaciara | Povoado Levantado |
| Central-West | GO | Iaciara, Posse | Baco-Pari |
| Central-West | GO | Iporá | Pilões |
| Central-West | GO | Itumbiara | Raízes do Congo |
| Central-West | GO | Matrinchã | São Felix |
| Central-West | GO | Mimoso de Goiás | Mimoso (Queixo Dantas, Filipanos, Tiririca, Brejo, Bom Jesus e Retiro) |
| Central-West | GO | Minaçu | São Felix |
| Central-West | GO | Mineiros | Buracão |
| Central-West | GO | Mineiros | Cedro |
| Central-West | GO | Monte Alegre de Goiás | Pelotas |
| Central-West | GO | Niquelândia | Rafael Machado |
| Central-West | GO | Niquelândia | Rufino Francisco |
| Central-West | GO | Niquelândia | Turiaçaba |
| Central-West | GO | Niquelândia | Vargem Grande do Muquém |
| Central-West | GO | Nova Roma | Quilombola do Magalhães |
| Central-West | GO | Nova Roma, Teresina | Abobreira |
| Central-West | GO | Padre Bernardo | Sumidouro (Barrinha, Grotão, Impuera, Água Quente, Fazenda Corrente) |
| Central-West | GO | Palmeiras de Goiás | Goianinha |
| Central-West | GO | Pilar de Goiás | Papuã |
| Central-West | GO | Piracanjuba | Ana Laura |
| Central-West | GO | Pirenópolis | Santa Bárbara |
| Central-West | GO | Posse | Olho d'Água da Lapa |
| Central-West | GO | Professor Jamil | Boa Nova |
| Central-West | GO | Santa Cruz de Goiás | Mucambo |
| Central-West | GO | Santa Rita do Novo Destino | Balbino dos Santos |
| Central-West | GO | Santa Rita do Novo Destino | Pombal |
| Central-West | GO | São João d'Aliança | Forte |
| Central-West | GO | São Luíz do Norte | Porto Leucádio |
| Central-West | GO | Silvânia | Almeidas |
| Central-West | GO | Simolândia | Castelo, Retiro e Três Rios |
| Central-West | GO | Trindade | Vó Rita |
| Central-West | GO | Uruaçu | João Borges Vieira |
| Central-West | GO | Vila Propício | Cachoeirinha |

== List of territories ==
Quilombola territories titled or in the process of being titled in Brazil.
| Order | quilombola land | Communities | County | State | Issuing body | Families | Claimed area (ha) | Title Size (ha) | Title date (dd/mm/year) | Notes |
|---|---|---|---|---|---|---|---|---|---|---|
| 155 | Kalunga | Areia, Barra, Barrinha, Boa Esperança, Boa Sorte, Bom Jardim, Bonito, Buriti, Buriti Velho, Buritizinho, Calda, Capela, Capim Puro, Capivara, Carolina, Côco, Congonha, Contenda, Córrego da Ser, Córrego Fundo I e II, Curriola, Diadema, Ema, Engenho II, Faina, Fazendinha, Gameleira, Gonçalo Vão das Almas, Jurema, Lagoa, Limoeiro, Maiadinha, Paiol da Roda, Parida, Pé de Morro, Pedra Preta, Prata, Redenção, Riachão, Ribeirão, Salinas, São Pedro, Sucuri, Suçuarana, Taboca, Terra Vermelha, Tinguizal, Ursa, Vão das Almas, Vargem Grande, Vasantão, Volta do Canto | Monte Alegre, Teresina de Goiás and Cavalcante | Goiás | INCRA | 888 | 261.999,6987 | 1.405,2500 | 20/11/2015 | Current title is 10% of claimed area |
