= Monte Alegre de Goiás =

- Municipality
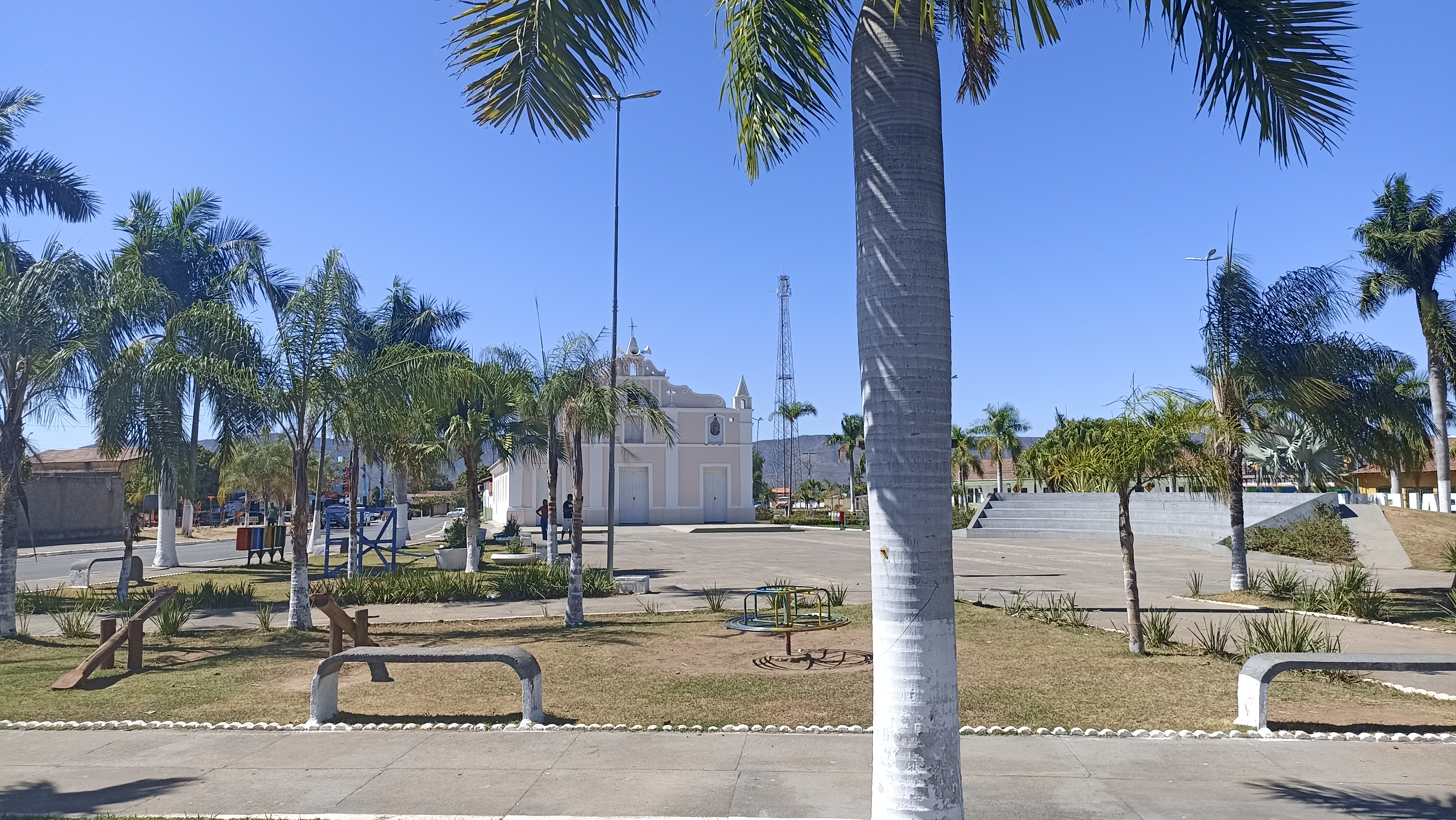

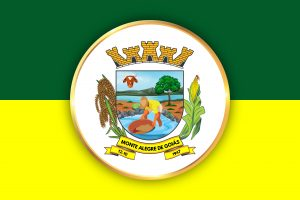
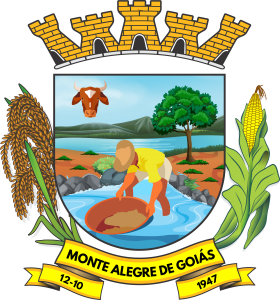
- Flag Coat of arms

- Location in Goiás state

- Location in Brazil
- Coordinates: 13°15′21″S 46°54′03″W
- Country: Brazil
- Region: Central-West
- State: Goiás
- Microregion: Chapada dos Veadeiros

Area
  - Total: 3,119.7 km^{2} (1,204.5 sq mi)
- Elevation: 557 m (1,827 ft)

Population (2020)
  - Total: 8,684
  - Density: 2.784/km^{2} (7.209/sq mi)
- Time zone: UTC−3 (BRT)
- Postal code: 73830-000

Monte Alegre de Goiás is a municipality in northeastern Goiás state, Brazil.

== Location ==
Monte Alegre is located in the statistical micro-region of Chapada dos Veadeiros and is 31 kilometers south of the border with Tocantins. G0-118 connects it with Teresina de Goiás and Campos Belos de Goiás. It is 568 kilometers from the state capital, Goiânia. Highway connections from Goiânia are made by BR-153 / Anápolis / BR-060 / Alexânia / Planaltina / GO-118 / BR-010 / São João d'Aliança / Alto Paraíso de Goiás / BR-010 / GO-118 / Teresina de Goiás. Municipal boundaries are with the state of Tocantins, Campos Belos de Goiás, Cavalcante, São Domingos, Divinópolis de Goiás, and Nova Roma.

The Serra da Contenda lies north of the region. The vegetation is mainly cerrado with tropical forest along the rivers. The Sumidouro forest, with 50 caves, is 90% preserved. There are many rivers: Rio Paranã, Manso, São Domingos, Bezerra, Prata, Sarzeda and Pagão. All of these rivers flow north to join the Paranã and eventually the Tocantins.

== Demographics ==
The population in 2007 was smaller than in 1980, having lost around 200 inhabitants. From 2000 to 2005 there was a loss of 2.03%.

== The economy ==
The economy is based on cattle raising with 90,000 head of cattle. Many residents work for the government and there is a small commercial sector. In 2007 there was 1 industrial unit and 36 retail units. There was 1 banking institution: Banco Itaú S.A.

In 2006 there were 121,200 head of cattle, of which 5,400 were milk cows. The main agricultural products in planted area were rice, sugarcane, beans, manioc, and corn (1,800 hectares). Most of the corn is grown for cattle feed during the dry months of the summer.

Agricultural data 2006

- Farms: 695
- Total area: 175,147 ha.
- Area of permanent crops: 442 ha.
- Area of perennial crops: 4,477 ha.
- Area of natural pasture: 92,754 ha.
- Area of woodland and forests: 66,983 ha.
- Persons dependent on farming: 2,200
- Number of tractors: 156
- Cattle herd: 90,000
- Main crop: corn with 1,850 planted hectares IBGE

== Health and education ==
In 2007 there was 1 hospital with 15 beds. The infant mortality rate was 45.34 in every 1,000 live births in 2000. This was much higher than the state average. There were no institutions of higher learning. The adult literacy rate was 75.8% in 2000, one of the lowest in the state.

Monte Alegre de Goiás is one of the poorest municipalities in the state. It ranked third from last place in the MHDI.

- Municipal Human Development Index (HDI-M): 0.626
- State ranking: 240 (out of 242 in 2000)
- National ranking: 4,205 (out of 5,507 in 2000) Source: Frigoletto

== History ==
Monte Alegre de Goiás was founded because of the search for gold. The first settlers arrived around 1769 in a place called Morro do Chapéu. A chapel was built to honor Santo Antonio, giving the town the name Santo Antônio do Morro do Chapéu. The bandeirantes, who came up from São Paulo, brought 2,000 Negro slaves with them. In 1957 the municipality of Chapéu had its name changed to Monte Alegre de Goiás. There are settlements nearby founded by runaway slaves. These Afro-Brazilians are known as Kalunga. They live on the slopes of the Paranã River and in valleys called "vãos". Today they live in the municipalities of Cavalcante, Monte Alegre de Goiás, and Teresina de Goiás. Their small settlements are Contenda, Kalunga, Vão das Almas, Vão dos Moleuqes, and Ribeirão dos Bois.

== See also ==
- List of municipalities in Goiás
- Microregions of Goiás
