= Campos Belos =

- Municipality
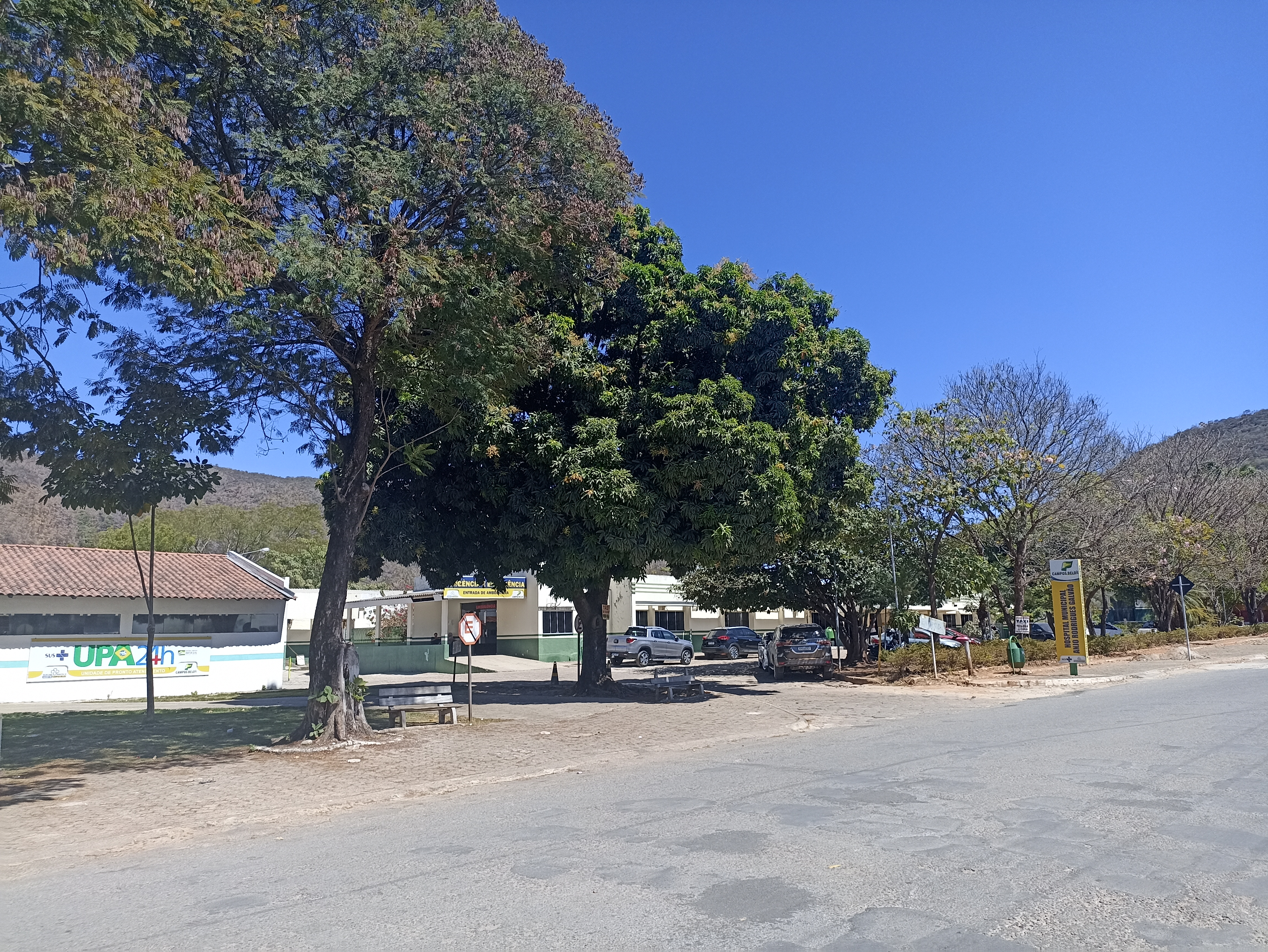

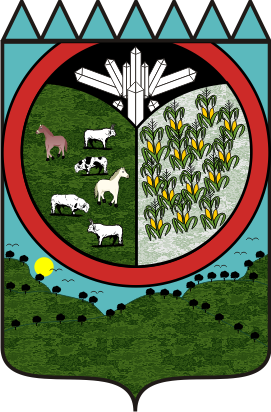
- Flag Coat of arms

- Location in Goiás state

- Location in Brazil
- Coordinates: 13°02′13″S 46°46′19″W
- Country: Brazil
- Region: Central-West
- State: Goiás
- Microregion: Chapada dos Veadeiros

Area
  - Total: 724.06 km^{2} (279.56 sq mi)
- Elevation: 640 m (2,100 ft)

Population (2020)
  - Total: 20,007
  - Density: 27.632/km^{2} (71.566/sq mi)
- Time zone: UTC−3 (BRT)
- Postal code: 73840-000

Campos Belos is a municipality in northeastern Goiás state, Brazil. It is a commercial center for a vast area in the northeast of the state.

== Location ==
Campos Belos is in the extreme northeast of Goiás and borders the state of Tocantins on the north, Bahia on the east and the municipalities of Monte Alegre de Goiás, Divinópolis, and São Domingos on the south and southwest.

It is 601 km. to the state capital, Goiânia. Highway connections are made by BR-153 / Anápolis / Alexânia / BR-060 / Planaltina / GO-430 / GO-118 / BR-010 / São João da Aliança / Alto Paraíso de Goiás / Teresina de Goiás / Monte Alegre de Goiás. There are connections with Arraias in the state of Tocantins to the north, taking highway BR-242.

Campos Belos lies in a region with a mixture of cerrado vegetation and the semi-arid caatinga. The town is surrounded by low mountains.

== Economy ==
The main economic activity is cattle raising (55,700 head in 2006), but it was minerals that brought the first settlers to this region. There are deposits of crystal, calciterite, iron, gold, and uranium. In recent years Campos Belos has become a commercial center for a vast area taking in the northeast of Goiás and the southeast of Tocantins. The main agricultural products in planted area were rice, sugarcane, and corn. There were three banking institutions represented—BRADESCO S.A., Banco do Brasil S.A., and - Banco Itaú S.A. (2007) Source:

Agricultural data 2006

- Farms: 265
- Total area: 47,987 ha.
- Area of permanent crops: 42 ha.
- Area of perennial crops: 684 ha.
- Area of natural pasture: 19,286 ha.
- Area of woodland and forests: 27,417 ha.
- Persons dependent on farming: 920
- Number of tractors: 38
- Cattle herd: 55,700
- Main crop: corn with 1,500 ha planted (2006) Source: IBGE

== Health and education ==
In the health sector there were 02 hospitals with 55 beds (2007).

- Municipal Human Development Index: 0.708
- State ranking: 201 (out of 242 municipalities)
- National ranking: 2,866 (out of 5,507 municipalities) Source: Frigoletto
- Literacy rate in 2000: 82.4%
- Infant mortality rate in 2000: 26.56

The state university of Goiás (UEG)opened a campus in Campos Belos in 2000, initially to offer a course in Letters. In a short time it tripled the number of students and now has approximately 800. See UEG Today the campus offers courses in Letters, Pedagogy, Geography, and Mathematics.

== History ==
Campos Belos began around the small chapel dedicated to Our Lady of the Conception in 1881. Lands were donated by local cattle ranchers for the foundation of the new town. In 1889 the settlement was elevated to district, belonging to Arraias, which is now part of the state of Tocantins. In 1953 Campos Belos became a city.

Development took off with the construction of Brasília in the 1950s and its inauguration in 1960. By the end of the 1970s the city had its first banking agencies and in the 1980s it was integrated into the national telephone system.

A major change occurred in 1988 when the state of Goiás was divided. Campos Belos became an inter-state municipality. Growth was substantial in the decade of the 1990s since the city began to supply the population of the new state of Tocantins, which did not have an adequate commercial infrastructure. With the construction of Palmas, the city acquired an alternative route of access to the north of the country.

== See also ==
- List of municipalities in Goiás
