= Kalungas =

Ethnic group in Brazil

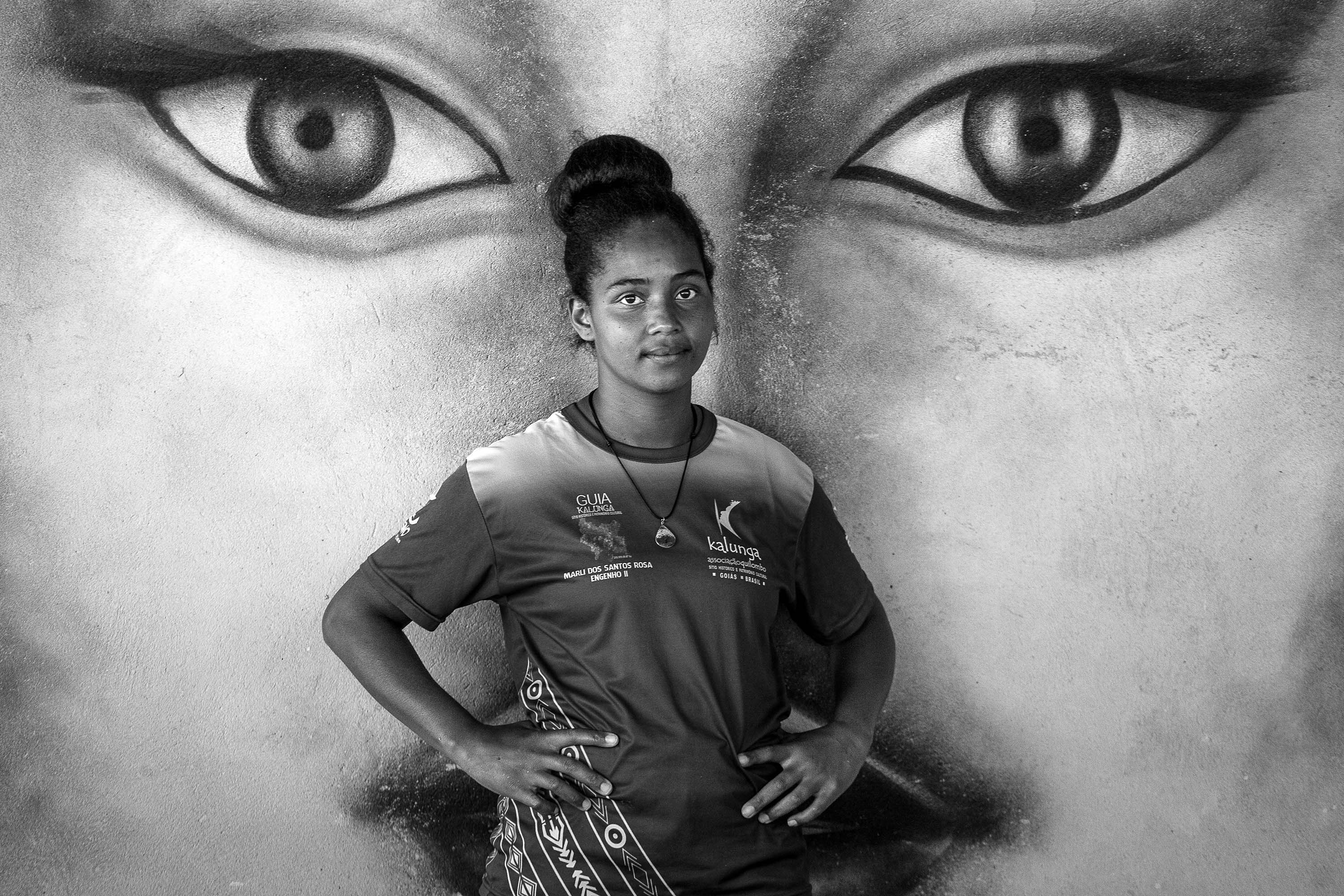
Contemporary tour guide from a Kalungas Quilombo. Foto Sergio Silva

The Kalungas are Afro-Brazilians that descend from people who freed themselves from slavery, and lived in remote settlements in Goiás state, Brazil. The Kalungas are one group of Quilombola, or people of African origin who live in hinterland settlements founded during the period of escaped slaves. Most of the approximately 5,000 Kalungas, who are of mixed African and indigenous ancestry, live in very poor conditions.

== Etymology ==
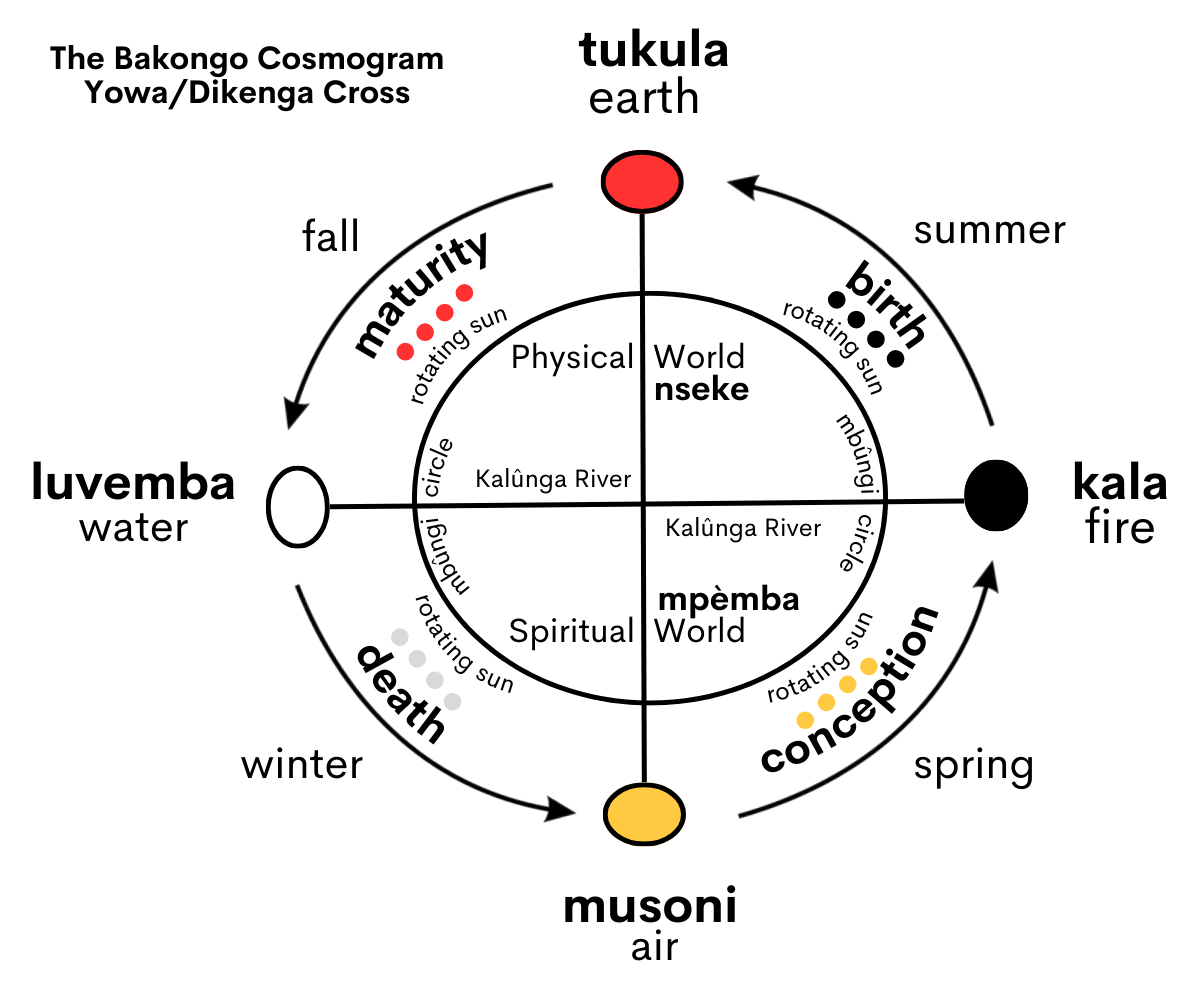
The Kongo cross, which depicts the Kalûnga line

In the regions of present-day northern Angola and southern Democratic Republic of Congo, the Bakongo and Kimbundu peoples traditionally believed in a Supreme god called Nzambi, who summoned a spark of fire, called Kalûnga, which created the universe, planets and all life within. Kalûnga became seen as "the nature of change," with Nzambi also becoming Kalûnga, the god of change. An aspect of their spirituality that was transported to the Americas via Atlantic slavery was the Kalûnga line, a watery boundary between the physical world of the living and the spiritual world of the ancestors. Because a majority of enslaved Afro-Brazilians were taken from the Kingdom of Kongo and the Kingdom of Ndongo, this is likely the origin of Kalungas.

== Demographics and settlement ==
All of the area occupied by the Kalungas was officially recognized by the state government in 1991 as a Historical Site and the Kalunga are preserved as Patrimônio Cultural Kalunga. The Kalungas settled in the mountains on both sides of the Paraná River, on slopes and in valleys, called Vãos. Today they occupy the territory of Cavalcante, Monte Alegre e Teresina de Goiás. The four main settlements are in the region of Contenda, the Vão do Calunga, the Vão de Almas, the Vão do Moleque and the Ribeirão dos Bois. Other Kalungas remain in unrecognized communities or in isolation. Legal land title for the territory was first granted by INCRA in 2015 with further grants of land title in 2018 and 2022, although the total land title comprises only 10% of Kalunga-settled territory.

== History ==
There is confusion about the meaning of the word Kalunga or Calunga, which, despite the same sound, have totally different meanings: Kalunga – connected to religious beliefs, world of the ancestors, cult of the forefathers, from them came the force; Calunga – small or insignificant thing; a way to call Negros, a famous or important person.

In the land of the Kalunga people, calunga is the name of a plant – Simaba ferruginea – and the place where it grows, near a stream of the same name. It makes the land where it grows sacred, a land that never dries, good for planting food for all of life.

They chose the chapada region because of its inaccessibility, since their former owners would not risk searching for them in that place. It is a sea of mountains and hills full of buriti palms extending to the horizon. They are steep slopes, full of stones. The narrow trails wind and climb, almost lost in the dense vegetation and stone walls fall abruptly into the low valleys.

These descendants of slaves lived isolated from the towns of Goiás. They learned to live with what the cerrado gave them, in food as well in building materials and tools. Even living isolated from each other they considered themselves relatives. Periodically, they would make their way out of the wasteland to venture down to the towns to buy kitchen utensils or certain foods. Their means of transport was primitive boats or troops of donkeys.

The Kalunga communities of Goiás have existed for approximately 250 years, and first came back into contact with researchers and the federal government in the 1960s.

In the municipal elections in Brazil in 2020, there were two quilombola candidates running for mayor. Vilmar Kalunga (PSB) was elected mayor of Cavalcante (Goiás), with 1,959 votes, becoming the first Kalunga mayor and second quilombola mayor in Brazil.

The Kalunga community have also distinguished themselves as firefighters in the Pantanal region, with many being hired by Prevfogo for six months every year to serve in areas around the country as well as to combat wildfires in countries such as Bolivia and Canada.

== See also ==
- Kalunga Line
