= Microregion of Chapada dos Veadeiros =

Coordinates: 13.0369°S 46.7719°W

Chapada dos Veadeiros
- Microregion
- Location in Goias state
- Country: Brazil
- State: Goiás
- Mesoregion: Norte Goiano
- Municipalities: 8

Area
  - Total: 21,337.5 km^{2} (8,238.5 sq mi)

Population (2012)
  - Total: 66,188
  - Density: 3.1020/km^{2} (8.0340/sq mi)

The Chapada dos Veadeiros Microregion is an IBGE statistical region in north-central Goiás state, Brazil. It has a population of 66,188 (2012) in a total area of 21,337.5 km^{2} (8,238.5 sq mi).

== Municipalities ==
The microregion consists of the following municipalities:

| Municipality | Area (km^{2}) | Inhabitants in 2000 | Inhabitants in 2007 | Population growth rate 1996/2007 | Urban population in 2007 | Rural population in 2007 |
|---|---|---|---|---|---|---|
| Alto Paraíso de Goiás | 2,594 | 5,968 | 6,638 | 1.87% | 4,595 | 2,043 |
| Campos Belos | 725 | 16,009 | 18,238 | 1.55% | 15,926 | 2,312 |
| Cavalcante | 6,953 | 10,460 | 9,875 | 0.34% | 3,976 | 5,899 |
| Colinas do Sul | 1,708 | 3,516 | 3,856 | 0.97% | 2,489 | 1,367 |
| Monte Alegre de Goiás | 3,120 | 6,433 | 7,155 | 0.97% | 3,121 | 4,034 |
| Nova Roma | 2,136 | 3,733 | 3,555 | -1.06% | 1,484 | 2,071 |
| São João d'Aliança | 3,327 | 2,147 | 8,177 | 2.91% | 5,094 | 3,083 |
| Teresina de Goiás | 775 | 2,325 | 2,773 | 2.76% | 1,931 | 842 |

== Economic Data ==
| Municipality | GDP in 2005 (R 1,000.00) | Cattle (head) 2006 | Corn (tons) 2007 |
|---|---|---|---|
| Alto Paraíso de Goiás | 30,743 | 31,000 | 12,000 |
| Campos Belos | 71,922 | 50,000 | 4,050 |
| Cavalcante | 171,511 | 51,500 | 3,750 |
| Colinas do Sul | 13,321 | 28,000 | 624 |
| Monte Alegre de Goiás | 34,491 | 131,000 | 3,885 |
| Nova Roma | 22,244 | 67,000 | 2,100 |
| São João d'Aliança | 55,274 | 65,400 | 49,500 |
| Teresina de Goiás | 8,868 | 8,800 | 200 |

== Health and education ==
| Municipality | MHDI 2000 | Literacy rate 2000 | Infant mortality rate 2000 |
|---|---|---|---|
| Alto Paraíso de Goiás | 0.738 | 86.4 | 26.56 |
| Campos Belos | 0.708 | 82.4 | 26.56 |
| Cavalcante | 0.609 | 61.7 | 30.02 |
| Colinas do Sul | 0.671 | 82.7 | 41.30 |
| Monte Alegre de Goiás | 0.625 | 75.8 | 45.34 |
| Nova Roma | 0.679 | 81.9 | 30.02 |
| São João d'Aliança | 0.718 | 84.0 | 26.56 |
| Teresina de Goiás | 0.672 | 74.2 | 26.56 |

== Statistics ==
- Largest area: Cavalcante with 6,979.5 km^{2}
- Smallest area: Teresina de Goiás with 777.5 km^{2}
- Greatest population: Campos Belos with 18,238 (2007)
- Smallest population: Teresina de Goiás with 2,773 (2007)
- Highest population growth rate 1996/2007: São João d'Aliança with 2.91%
- Lowest population growth rate 1996/2007: Nova Roma with -1.06%
- Lowest score on the Municipal Human Development Index: Cavalcante with 0.609
- Highest score on the Municipal Human Development Index: Alto Paraíso de Goiás with 0.738
- Highest literacy rate: Alto Paraíso de Goiás with 86.4 (2000)
- Lowest literacy rate: Cavalcante with 61.7 (2000)
- Highest infant mortality rate: Monte Alegre de Goiás with 45.34 in every 1,000 live births (2000)
- Lowest infant mortality rate: Alto Paraíso de Goiás with 26.56 in every 1,000 live births (2000)
- Highest GDP: Cavalcante with 171,000,000 Reais (2005)
- Lowest GDP: Teresina de Goiás with 8,800,000 Reais (2005)
- Highest per capita GDP: Cavalcante with 17,549 Reais (2005)
- Lowest per capita GDP: Teresina de Goiás with 2,652 Reais (2005)
- Greatest cattle herd: Monte Alegre de Goiás with 121,200 head (2006)
- Greatest production of soybeans: São João d'Aliança with 60,000 tons (2007)
- Greatest production of corn: São João d'Aliança with 49,500 tons (2007) Source: Estatísticas Municipais

== See also ==
- List of municipalities in Goiás
- Microregions of Goiás
