= Niquelândia =

- Municipality
- The Municipality of Niquelândia
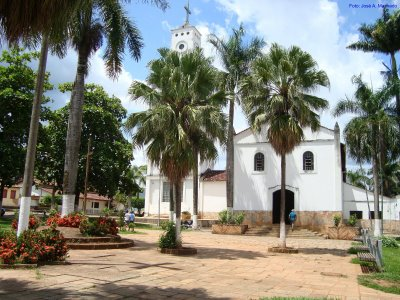
- Square in front of the main church

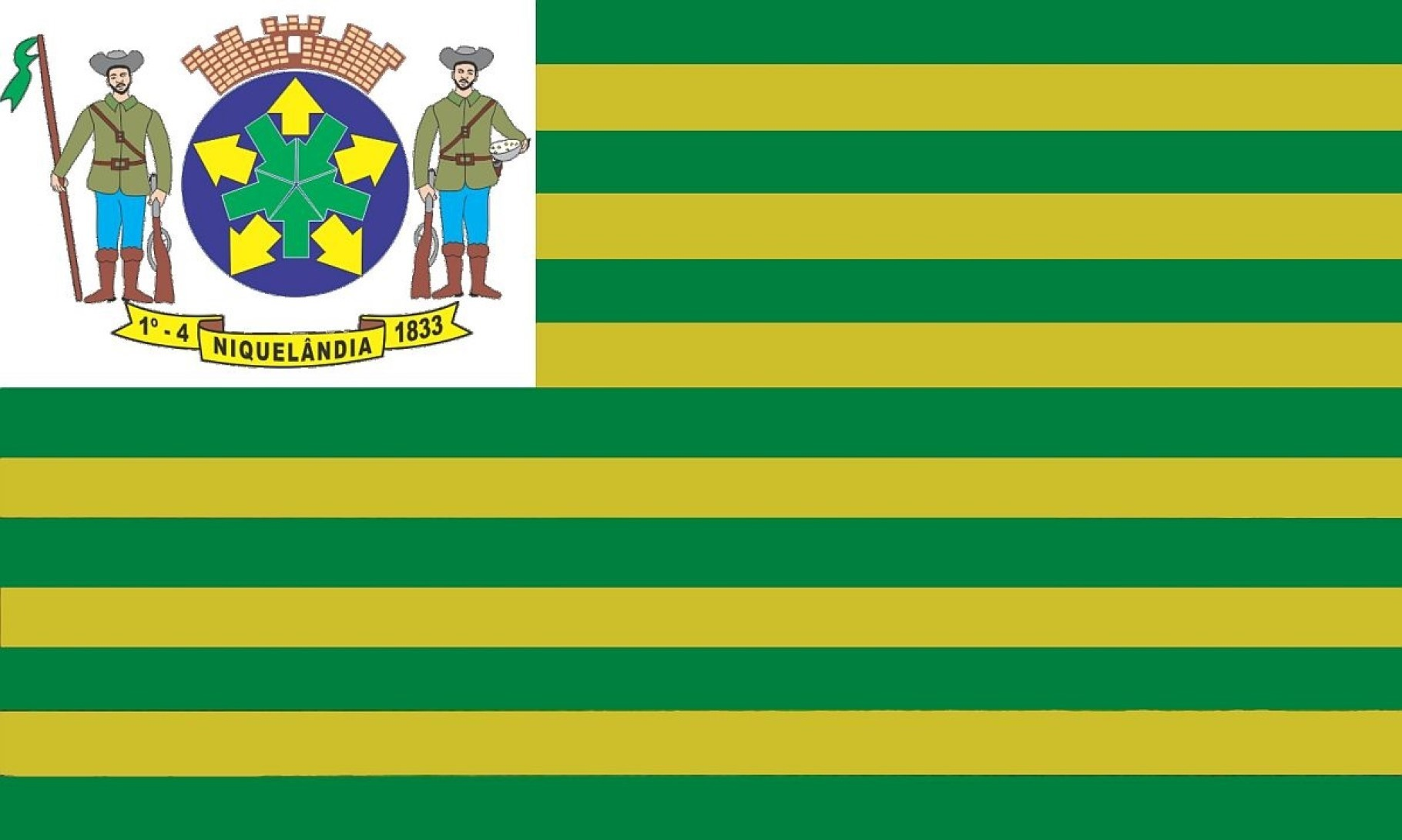
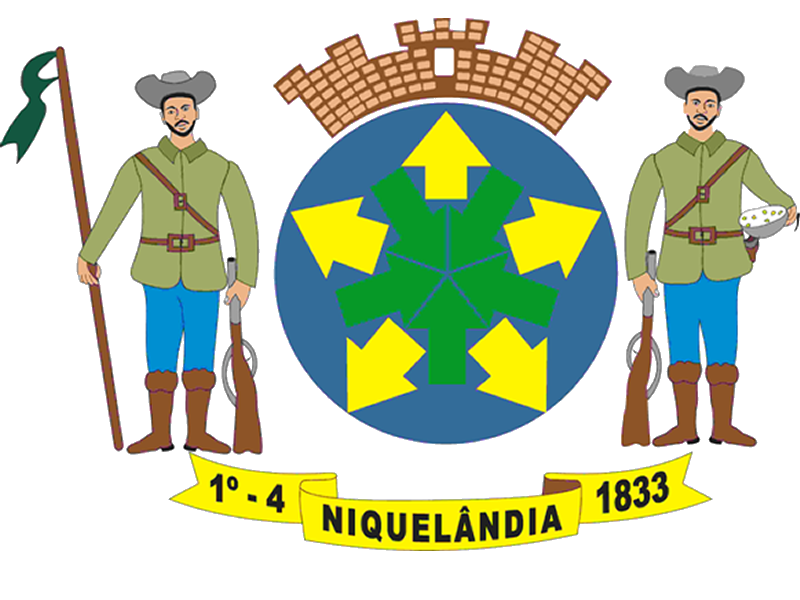
- Flag Coat of arms
- Nickname: "Capital do níquel" (Capital of nickel)
- Location of Niquelândia in the State of Goiás
- Coordinates: 14°28′03″S 48°27′32″W
- Country: Brazil
- Region: Center-West
- State: Goiás
- Founded: March 19, 1735

Government
  - Mayor: VALDETO FERREIRA (PSB)

Area
  - Total: 9,843.170 km^{2} (3,800.469 sq mi)
- Elevation: 650 m (2,130 ft)

Population (2020)
  - Total: 46,730
  - Density: 4.747/km^{2} (12.30/sq mi)
- Time zone: UTC−3 (BRT)
- HDI (2000): 0.739 – medium
- Website: www.niquelandia.go.gov.br

Niquelândia is municipality in northern Goiás state, Brazil. It is the largest municipality in the state in area and is an important producer of minerals.

== Geography ==
Niquelândia is 370 km from the state capital, Goiânia, and has an elevation of 650 meters above sea level. The average annual temperature is 32 °C, and the climate is tropical humid.

The municipality is crossed by highways BR-414 and GO-080, GO-237 e GO-327, besides the various municipal roads that make up a total of 12,000 kilometers.

Highway connections with Goiânia are made by GO-080 / Nerópolis / São Francisco de Goiás / BR-153 / Jaraguá / GO-080 / Goianésia / Barro Alto / GO-342 / BR-080 / BR-153 / Uruaçu / GO-237.

Municipal boundaries are with Água Fria de Goiás, Alto Paraíso de Goiás, Barro Alto, Campinaçu, Colinas do Sul, Mimoso de Goiás, Santa Rita do Novo Destino, São João d'Aliança, Uruaçu and Vila Propício.

The size of the municipal area compared to countries ranks it below Lebanon and above Cyprus.

== Economy ==
As the name of the city implies (Niquelândia can be translated as "Nickeland"), it is the national capital of nickel. It has one of the largest nickel reserves in the world, which are exploited by two mining companies: Companhia Níquel Tocantins—CNT, belonging to the Votorantim group -, and Codemin - to Anglo American.

Although mining is practically all done for nickel, there are also more than 120 types of mineral, such as gold, crystal, platinum, copper, mica, iron, manganese, diamonds, quartz, marble, cobalt, asbestos and even uranium.

The nickel mines bring needed jobs but also cause serious problem to the health of the inhabitants. The ovens to heat the raw material operate at one thousand degrees Celsius and highly toxic ammonia is used in the process. This mixture damages the skin, kidneys, the digestive and the respiratory tract.

Mining is not the only economic activity in the region with cattle raising (250,000 head in 2006), agriculture, small transformation industries, commerce, and public administration employing large segments of the population. In 2007 there were 4 banking agencies: CEF - Banco do Brasil S.A. - Banco Itaú S.A. - Banco ABN AMRO Real S.A (Agosto/2007).

=== Agricultural Census (2006) ===
- Farms: 2,168
- Planted area: 15,345 hectares
- Natural Pasture: 53,300 hectares
- Woodland and Forest: 181,389 hectares
- Persons occupied related to the farm owner: 4,543
- Persons occupied not related to the farm owner: 839
- Main crops: soybeans (20,000 hectares), corn (5,000 hectares), and rice (2,000 hectares).

== History ==
Niquelândia is one of the oldest towns in the state of Goiás. It was settled shortly after the arrival of the Portuguese bandeirantes, with the news of the discovery of gold. Niquelândia is one of the oldest municipalities in Goiás. The town was founded in 1735 as São José do Tocantins. In 1938, the German miner Freimund Brockes was panhandling in the region for gold and discovered the second largest nickel deposit in the world. This discovery attracted miners from all over Brazil and the little town grew rapidly. In 1943 the city changed its name to Niquelândia.

== Tourism ==
The most important touristic site near the town is the artificial lake of Serra da Mesa. It was created with the construction of the Serra da Mesa Dam, in Minaçu, at the end of the nineties. It is formed by the joining of the Maranhão, Tocantinzinho and Bagagem rivers.

Serra da Mesa has one of the largest concentrations of fresh water in the country, with a surface of 1,784 km^{2}. With 57% of its area in the municipality of Niquelândia, it has reached a width of 22 km. in the rainy season.

== Health and education ==
- Hospitals: 5 with 167 beds (2007)
- Schools: 40 with 14,365 students (2006)
- Higher education: Unidade Universitária de UEG
- Infant mortality rate in 2000: 26.40
- Literacy rate in 2000: 84.4%

=== Index of Economic Development (Seplan 2001) ===
- 39/246 municipalities. See Seplan

=== Index of Social Development (Seplan 2000) ===
- 147/246 municipalities. See Seplan

== See also ==
- List of municipalities in Goiás
