= Nova Roma, Goiás =

Nova Roma
- Municipality
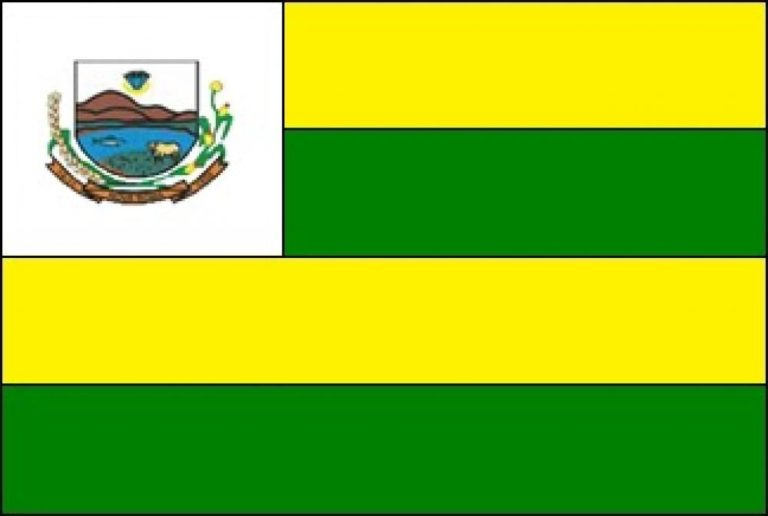
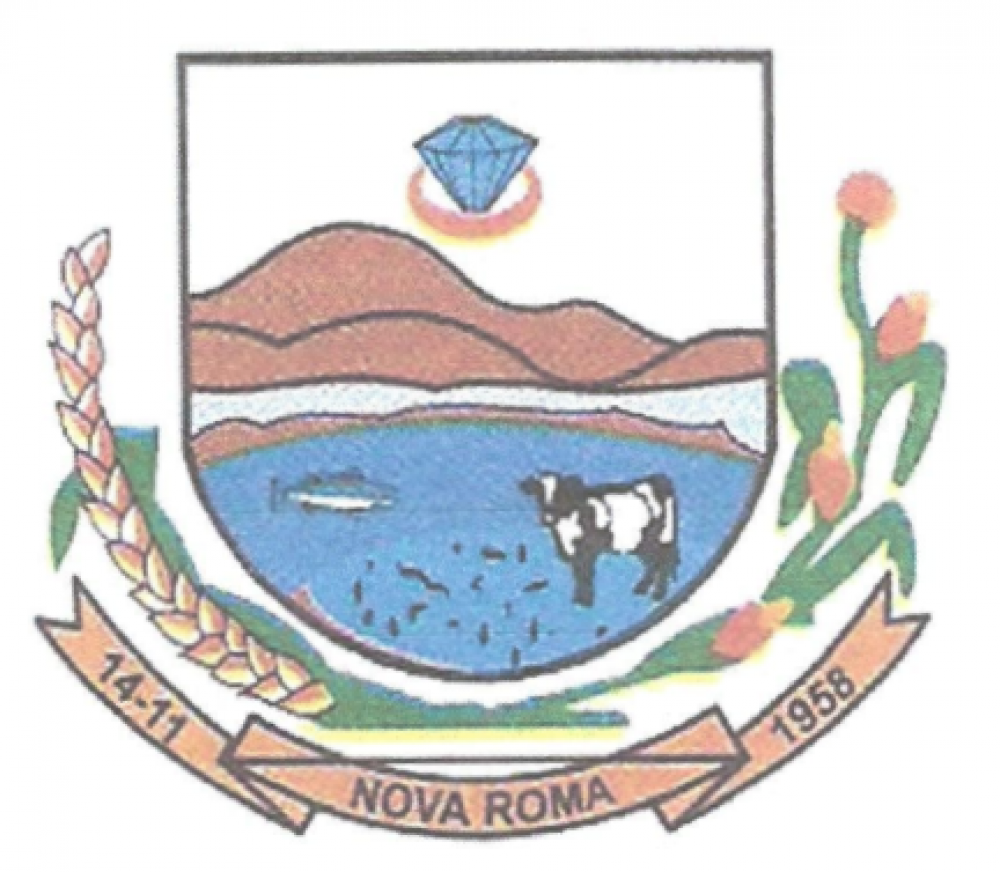
- Flag Coat of arms

- Location in Goiás state

- Location in Brazil
- Coordinates: 13°44′23″S 46°51′51″W
- Country: Brazil
- Region: Central-West
- State: Goiás
- Microregion: Chapada dos Veadeiros

Area
  - Total: 2,135.9 km^{2} (824.7 sq mi)
- Elevation: 610 m (2,000 ft)

Population (2020)
  - Total: 3,236
  - Density: 1.515/km^{2} (3.924/sq mi)
- Time zone: UTC−3 (BRT)
- Postal code: 73820-000

Nova Roma is a municipality in northeastern Goiás state, Brazil. It is part of the statistical micro-region of Chapada dos Veadeiros. It is crossed by the important Paranã River, a tributary of the Tocantins.

== History ==
In the seventeenth century the settlement of São Teodoro existed in the region. Gold mining was the main economic activity. In 1858 it was elevated to the status of district with the name of Nova Roma, belonging to the villa of Cavalcante. In 1943 the district changed its name to Guataçuba, changing back to Nova Roma again in 1947. In 1953 it was transferred to the municipality of Veadeiros, becoming dismembered in 1948 with its present name.

== Boundaries ==
There are poor road connections with Teresina de Goiás, 72 kilometers to the west, Monte Alegre de Goiás, 58 kilometers north, Alto Paraíso de Goiás, 100 kilometers southwest, and Iaciara, 71 kilometers southeast. The distance to the state capital, Goiânia is 616 km. Highway connections from Goiânia are made by BR-153 / Anápolis / GO-060 / Alexânia / Formosa / BR-020 / Alvorada do Norte / GO-112 / Iaciara.

Municipal boundaries are with:

- north:: Monte Alegre de Goiás
- west: Teresina de Goiás and Alto Paraíso de Goiás
- east: São Domingos and Iaciara
- south: São João da Aliança

== Economy ==
The economy is based on agriculture, cattle raising, services, modest transformation industries, and public employment. In 2006 there were 67,200 head of cattle. The main agricultural products were pumpkin, rice, banana, sugarcane, beans, manioc, and corn (1,500 hectares planted).

- Hospitals: 01 with 14 beds
- Infant mortality rate : 30.02, below the national average of 33.0.
- Adult literacy rate: 81.9%, below the national average of 86.4%.
- HDI-M: 0.679
- State ranking: 223 (out of 242 municipalities)
- National ranking: 3,323 (out of 5,507 municipalities)

== See also ==
- List of municipalities in Goiás
