= Bona Espero =

Good Hope Esperanto: Bona Espero

Location
- Alto Paraíso de Goiás, Goiás; Brazil

Information
- Established: 1957; 68 years ago
- Language: Brazilian Portuguese; Esperanto
- Website: bonaespero.org.br/mobirise/BE/index.html

Bona Espero (Esperanto: Good Hope) is a community and rural school for poor children in Alto Paraíso de Goiás, Brazil.

== Purpose ==
Esperantists at Bona Espero protect and educate orphans and children of low socio-economic status. They are taught to read, an initiative which is funded by Esperantists and Esperanto organisations from diverse nations, including Germany. The government of Brazil provides support only through free electricity and payment to the teachers working there. Thanks to the volunteer efforts, more than 400 children have been taught to read and many have gone on to higher level education. 20 of them are now certified teachers in neighbouring villages.

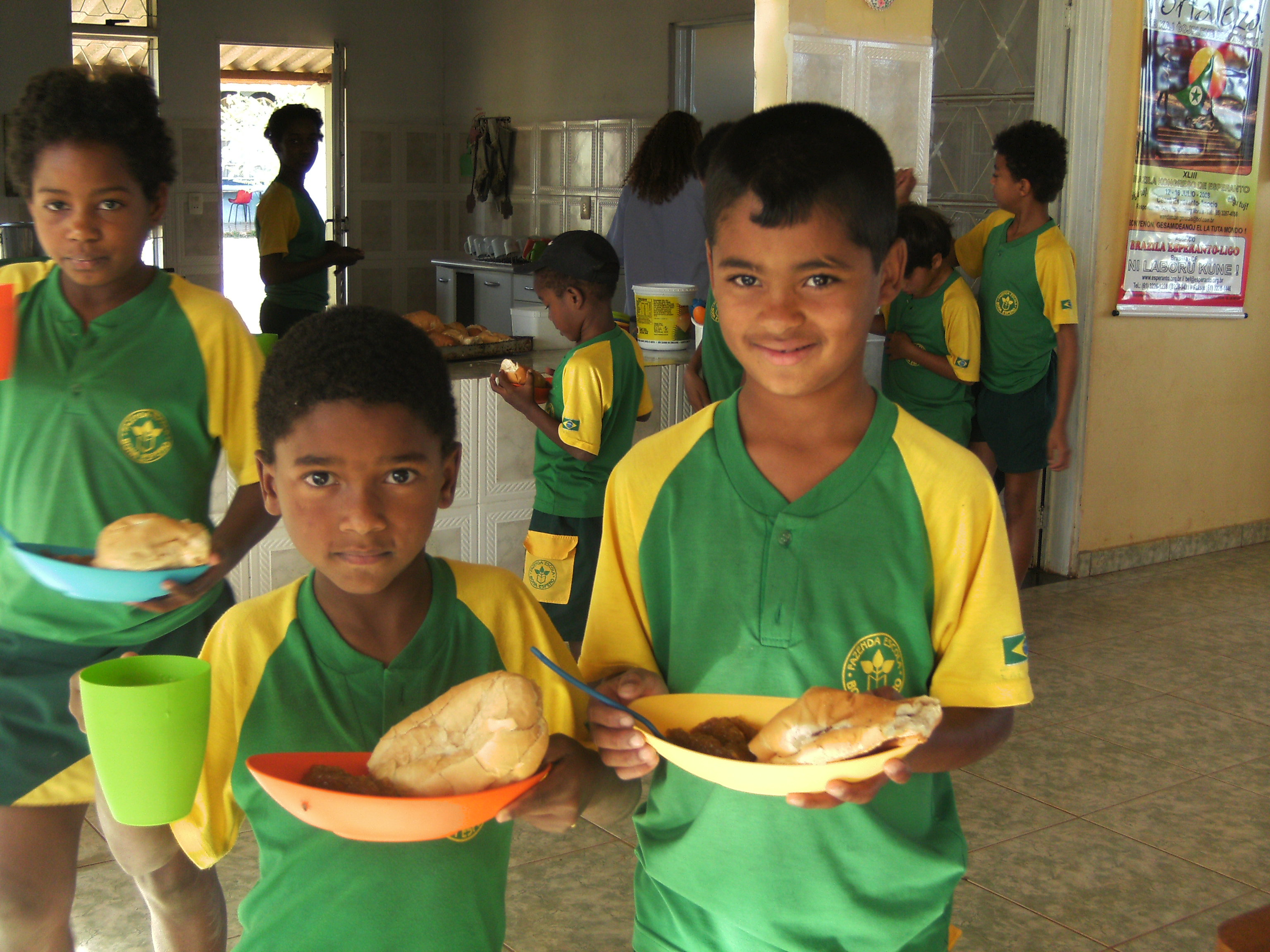
Bona Espero in 2003

Bona Espero uses Esperanto as the second language taught. Brazilian Portuguese is the chief language of instruction in the classroom.

== History ==
The school was established in 1957.
