= Colinas do Sul =

- Municipality
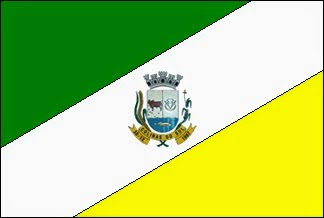
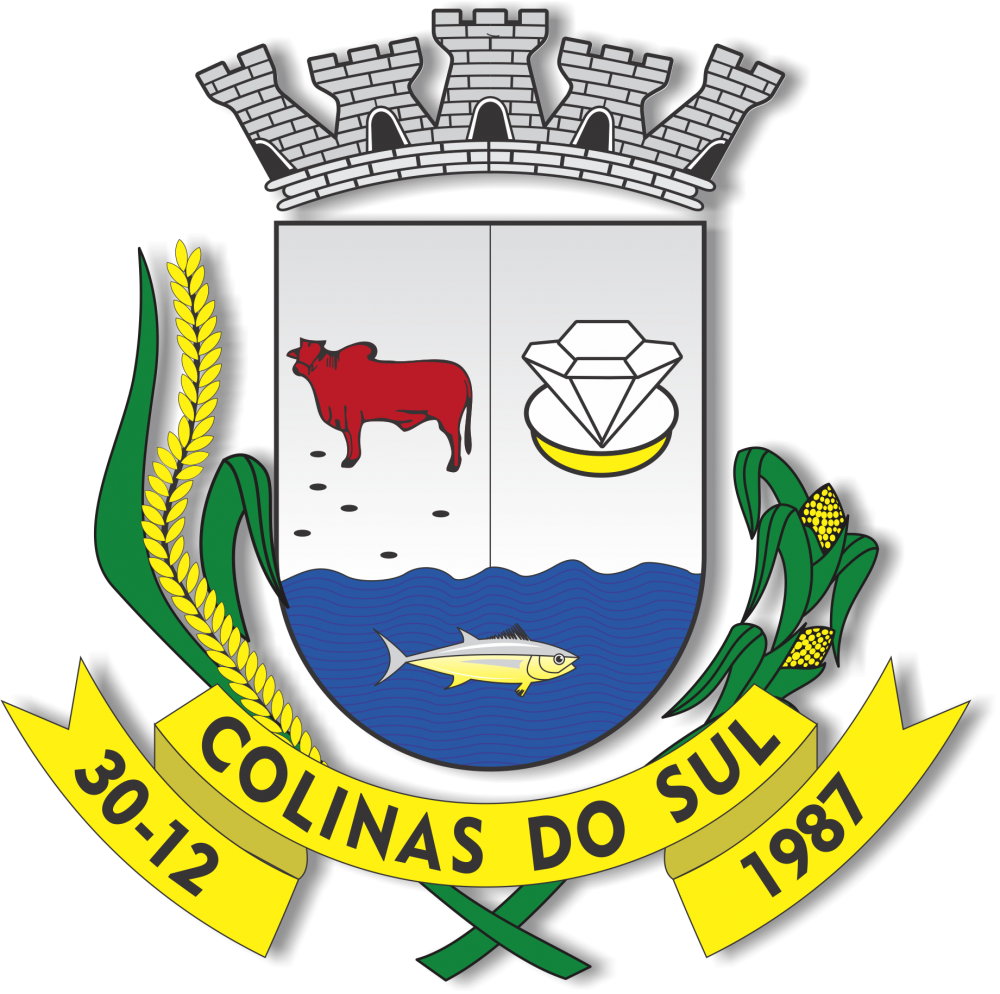
- Flag Coat of arms

- Location in Goiás state

- Location in Brazil
- Coordinates: 14°09′06″S 48°04′28″W
- Country: Brazil
- Region: Central-West
- State: Goiás
- Microregion: Chapada dos Veadeiros

Area
  - Total: 1,708.2 km^{2} (659.5 sq mi)
- Elevation: 5,353 m (17,562 ft)

Population (2020)
  - Total: 3,360
  - Density: 1.97/km^{2} (5.09/sq mi)
- Time zone: UTC−3 (BRT)
- Postal code: 73740-000

Colinas do Sul is a municipality in north-central Goiás state, Brazil.

== Location ==
Colinas is located in the Chapada dos Veadeiros statistical micro-region and is almost directly north of Brasília, to which it is connected by G0-327 as far as Alto Paraíso de Goiás then by G0-118 south to Planaltina, where the highway joins with BR-020. It is 458 kilometers from Goiânia and 270 kilometers from Brasília.

Highway connections from Goiânia are made by GO-080 / Nerópolis / Petrolina de Goiás / BR-153 / Jaraguá / GO-080 / Goianésia / Barro Alto / BR-080 / GO-342 / Uruaçu / GO-237 / Niquelândia / GO-132 / (54 km under construction in 2004).

Municipal boundaries are with:

- north: Cavalcante
- west: Campinaçu and Minaçu
- east: Alto Paraíso de Goiás
- south and west: Niquelândia

Colinas do Sul is halfway between São Jorge, district of Alto Paraíso de Goiás and Niquelândia, near one of the southern arms of the Serra da Mesa artificial lake. By way of Colinas it is possible to reach touristic points on the banks of the lake, like Mato Verde (12 km.), Chapada da Visão, Chiqueiro de Pedra and Vale do Lago. On a dirt road it is possible to go around the Serra de Santana and the Chapada dos Veadeiros National Park, going through Rio Preto and Capela until arriving at Cavalcante.

== The economy ==
The main economic activities are ecotourism, based on the park, cattle raising (29,000 head in 2006) and some agriculture (rice and corn).

Agricultural data 2006

- Farms: 363
- Total area: 130,630 ha.
- Area of permanent crops: 232 ha.
- Area of perennial crops: 1,405 ha.
- Area of natural pasture: 71,503 ha.
- Area of woodland and forests: 39,964 ha.
- Persons dependent on farming: 1,050
- Number of tractors: 86
- Cattle herd: 29,000
- Main crop: corn with 260 planted hectares IBGE

== Health and education ==
- Schools: 08 (2006)
- Hospitals: 01 with 15 beds (2007)
- Adult literacy rate: 82.7% (2000)
- Infant mortality rate: 41.30 in 1,000 live births (2000)
- MHDI: 0.671
- State ranking: 228 (out of 242 municipalities)
- National ranking: 3,442 (out of 5,507 municipalities) Source: Frigoletto

== History ==
Colinas do Sul appears for the first time in official documents as the district of Lages belonging to Cavalcante. In 1938 the district of Lages was made extinct and became the district of Cafelândia. In 1943 the district of Cafelândia changed its name to Araí. In 1949 the name of Lages returned. In 1955 the district of Lages passed to the district of Colinas, which in 1989 was dismembered from Cavalcante.
