= Chapada dos Veadeiros National Park =

UNESCO World Heritage Site
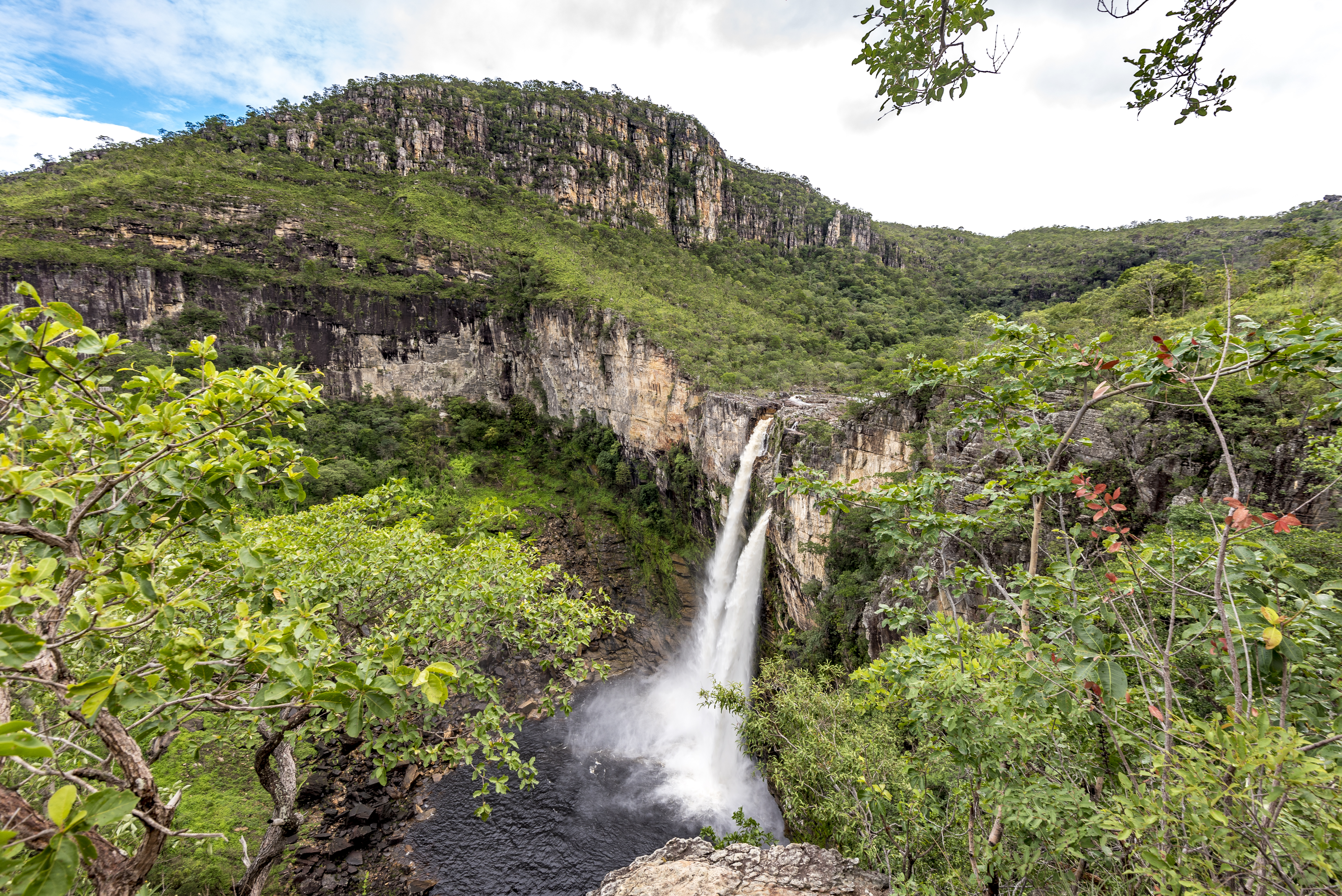

- Location within Brazil
- Location: Goiás, Brazil
- Part of: Cerrado Protected Areas: Chapada dos Veadeiros and Emas National Parks
- Criteria: Natural: (ix)(x)
- Reference: 1035-001
- Inscription: 2001 (25th Session)
- Area: 240,586 ha (594,500 acres)
- Coordinates: 14°0′20.50″S 47°41′4.60″W

Chapada dos Veadeiros National Park (Portuguese: Parque Nacional da Chapada dos Veadeiros) is a national park of Brazil located in the state of Goiás, on the top of an ancient plateau with an estimated age of 1.8 billion years. The park was created on January 11, 1961, by President Juscelino Kubitschek, and listed as a World Heritage Site by Unesco in 2001. It occupies an area of 2,405 square kilometres (929 mi^{2}) in the municipalities of Alto Paraíso de Goiás, Cavalcante and Colinas do Sul. The park is maintained by Chico Mendes Institute for Biodiversity Conservation.

== History ==
The Chapada dos Veadeiros region was first developed around the gold rush in the 18th century. Cavalcante was one of the first villages founded in the region, and at one point became one of Brazil's major gold extractors. Some reports say that Isabel, Princess Imperial of Brazil visited Cavalcante, making it the capital of the Empire for a day. The necessity of slave labor to work the mines in the Chapada dos Veadeiros was so great that the region is now home to some of the biggest Quilombo communities in Brazil.

=== Kalungas ===
The Quilombos are communities of Afro-Brazilians who managed to escape from slavery, both from agricultural plantations and mines. The Quilombo communities of Chapada dos Veadeiros include a subgroup known as the Kalungas. The word Kalunga meant "something of smaller value" in the past. The term is now a term of pride for the Kalunga group. Their image in Brazil has grown. With the end of the golden period of mining, the Chapada dos Veadeiros had only an isolated collection of villages; they were rediscovered and engaged in tourism to support Kalunga communities.

== Geography ==
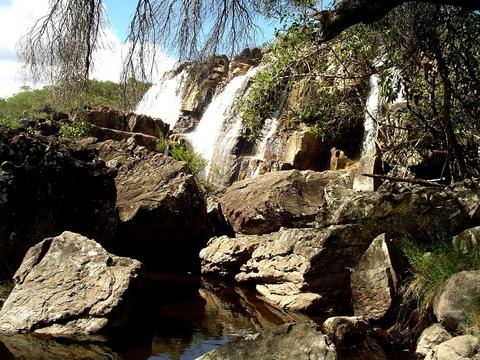

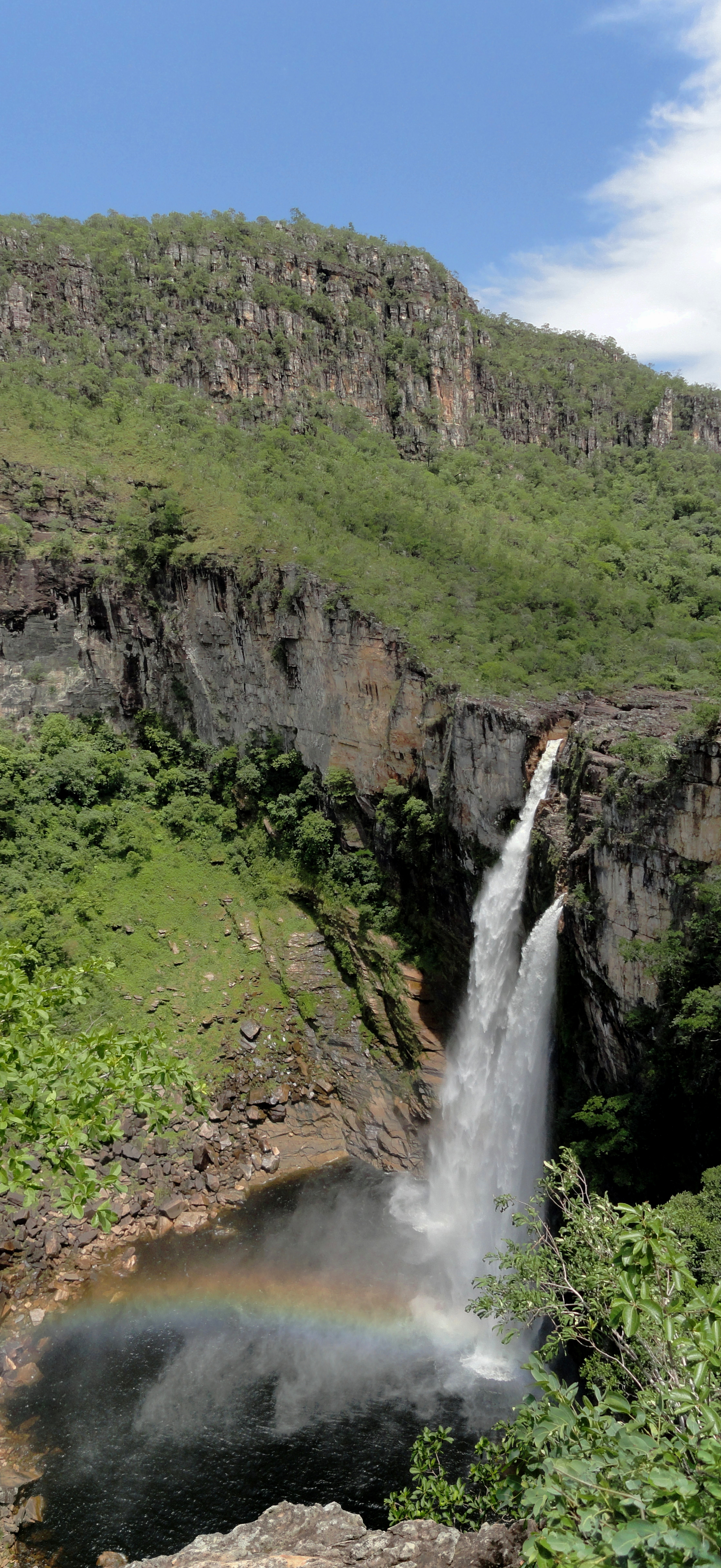
Rainbow adorns the Salto II waterfall of "Black River"

=== Climate ===
The average yearly temperature is 24–26 °C (75–79 °F), ranging from a minimum of 4–8 °C (39–46 °F) and reaching a maximum of 40–42 °C (104–108 °F).

=== Altitude ===
With altitudes between 600 and 1,650 meters (1,970 and 5,410 ft), it is the highest plain in Central Brazil. The highest point of the park and of the state of Goiás is Serra da Santana, at 1,691 meters (5,548 ft) above sea level.

=== Rock formations ===
Its rock formations are one of the oldest on the planet. There are quartz with outcrops of crystals. These rocks are exported and appreciated in Japan and England, where for some decades they were used for industrial work.

Rock crystals are present in the soil of the rich cerrado, or open pasture. Forest growth is also still found in the region, where more than 25 species of orchids can be found, besides other Brazilian species such as pau d'arco roxo, copaíba (copa tree), aroeira (California pepper tree), tamanqueira (cork tree), terivá (a variety of palm tree), buritis (wine-palm) and Babaçu (Babassu).

The main river in the park is the Rio Preto, a tributary of the Tocantins River. There are many waterfalls along its course such as the Rio Preto Falls (120 meters (390 ft) high, 80 meters (260 ft) at the base) and the Cariocas Falls. The park is noted for its scenic canyons, with walls of up to 40 meters (130 ft) high and valleys of up to 300 square meters (3,200 sq ft) deep.

=== List of waterfalls ===
Chapada dos Veadeiros National Park is noted for its waterfalls. Those which range from 80 to 120 meters (260 to 390 ft) include the Corredeiras, Cannyon I, Cannyon II, the Carioquinhas Waterfall and the Jardim de Maitréya. In properties with controlled access: Águas Quentes, Morada do Sol, Banho das Crianças and Vale das Andorinhas, Salto do Raizama and Cannyon do Rio São Miguel, Vale da lua, Cachoeiras Almécegas I and Almécegas II, Cachoeira de São Bento, Cataratas do Rio dos Couros, Cachoeira do Rio Cristal, Cachoeira dos Anjos e dos Arcanjos, Água Fria, Cachoeira do Rio das Almas, Poço Encantado, Sertão Zen, Cachoeira do Rio Macaco, Território Kalunga, Lago Serra da Mesa, Bocaina do Faria, Cachoeira das Neves, Mirante do Pouso Alto, Alpes Goianos, Cachoeira do Santana, Cachoeira da Ave Maria, Morada do Sol, Pedra Escrita, Cachoeira das Pedras Bonitas, Cachoeira Santa Bárbara, Cachoeira Capivara, Cachoeira Candaru, Cachoeiras Barroco, Cachoeiras do Pratinha, Cachoeira Rei do Prata, Cachoeiras do Curriola, Cachoeira do São Bartolomeu, Cachoeiras Veredas, and Ponte de Pedra.

=== The local fauna ===
The rich fauna of the region includes species, some of which are threatened by extinction, such as the pampas deer (locally known as veado campeiro), marsh deer (cervo do pantanal), maned wolf (lobo guará), jaguar, and others like the rhea (ema), seriema, tapeti, giant armadillo (tatu canastra), anteater (tamanduá), capybara (capivara), tapir (anta), green-beaked toucan (tucano de bico verde), black vulture (urubu preto), and the king vulture (urubu rei).
