= Teresina de Goiás =

- Municipality
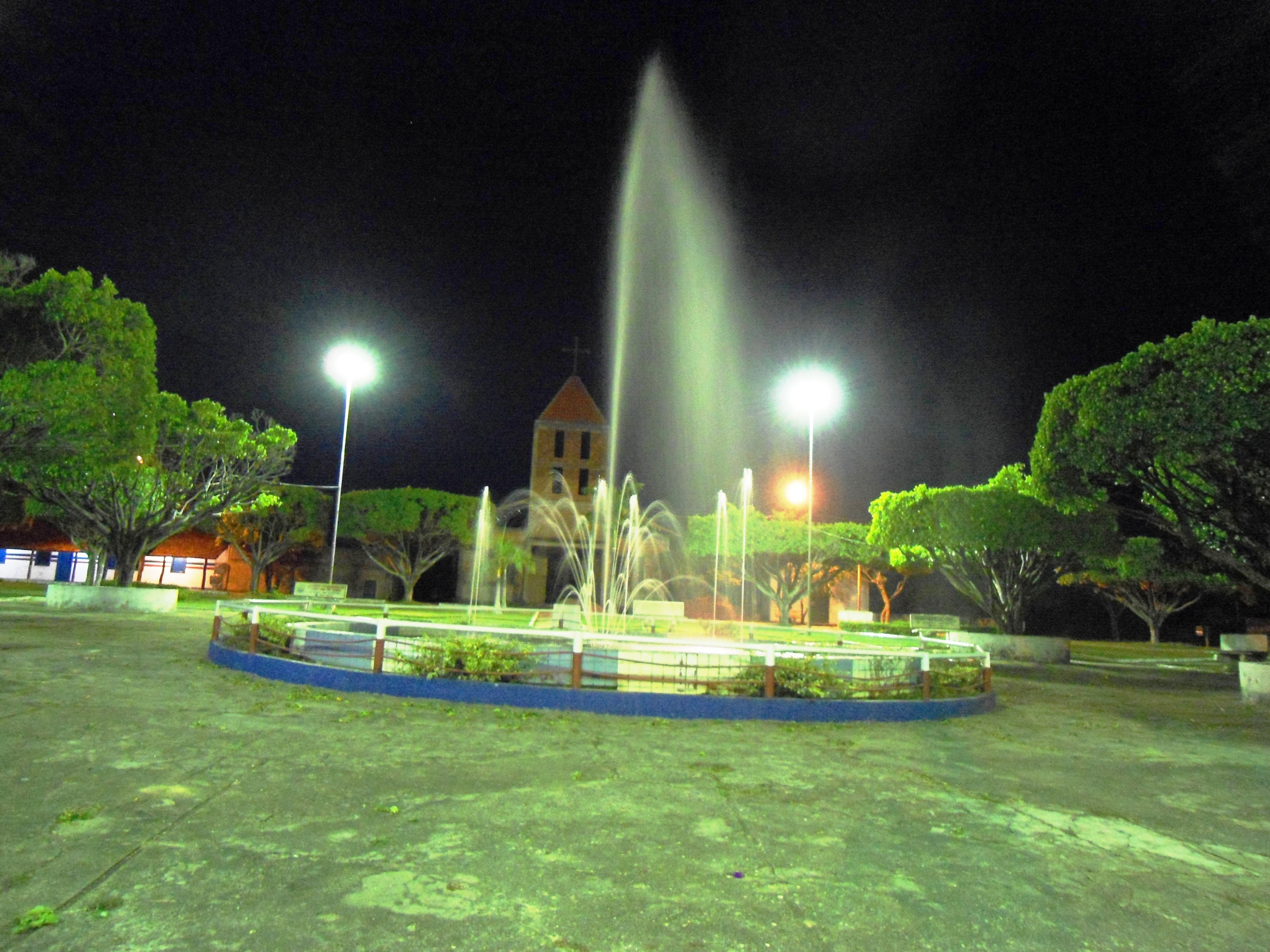

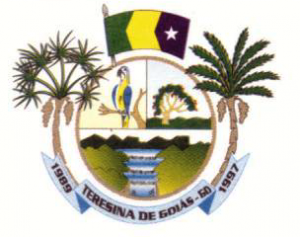
- Flag Coat of arms

- Location in Goiás state

- Location in Brazil
- Coordinates: 13°46′44″S 47°16′33″W
- Country: Brazil
- Region: Central-West
- State: Goiás
- Microregion: Chapada dos Veadeiros

Area
  - Total: 774.6 km^{2} (299.1 sq mi)
- Elevation: 754 m (2,474 ft)

Population (2020)
  - Total: 3,498
  - Density: 4.516/km^{2} (11.70/sq mi)
- Time zone: UTC−3 (BRT)
- Postal code: 73795-000

Teresina de Goiás is a municipality in northern Goiás state, Brazil.

== Location ==
It is part of the region of the statistical micro-region of Chapada dos Veadeiros and is located north of the Federal District and Brasília. It is 67 km north of Alto Paraíso de Goiás. The nearest major population center is Formosa. Neighboring municipalities are Alto Paraíso de Goiás, Cavalcante, and Nova Roma, Goiás.

The distance to the state capital, Goiânia, is 488 km. Highway connections are made by BR-153 / Anápolis / BR-060 / Alexânia / Planaltina / GO-118 / BR-010 / São João d'Aliança / Alto Paraíso de Goiás / BR-010 / GO-118.

Teresina is near the Chapada dos Veadeiros National Park. Communities of descendants of runaway slaves, called Kalunga, are found nearby.

== The economy ==
The economy is based on subsistence agriculture, cattle raising (10,700 in 2006), services, public administration, and small transformation industries. There were no banking institutions or hospitals in 2007. There were 50 automobiles, 8 trucks, and 9 pick-up trucks in all of the municipality in 2007. IBGE

Agricultural Information

- Number of farms: 194
- Total area: 64,696
- Area of permanent crops: 33
- Area of perennial crops: 242
- Area of natural pasture: 56,935
- Persons dependent on agriculture: 320
- Number of farms with tractors: 6
- Tractors: 9 IBGE

== Health and education ==
- Adult literacy rate: 74.2% (2000) (national average was 86.4%)
- Infant mortality rate: 26.50 (2000) (national average was 33.0). The rate was 47.7 in 1990.
- Municipal Human Development Index: 0.672
- State ranking: 227 (out of 242 municipalities)
- National ranking: 3,430 (out of 5,507 municipalities) Frigoletto
- Schools: 7 with 1,221 students (2006)
- Hospitals: none, but there was one public ambulatory clinic Seplan

Teresina was first created as a district of the municipality of Cavalcante in 1968, becoming dismembered in 1988.

== See also ==
- List of municipalities in Goiás
- Microregions of Goiás
