= São João d'Aliança =

- Municipality
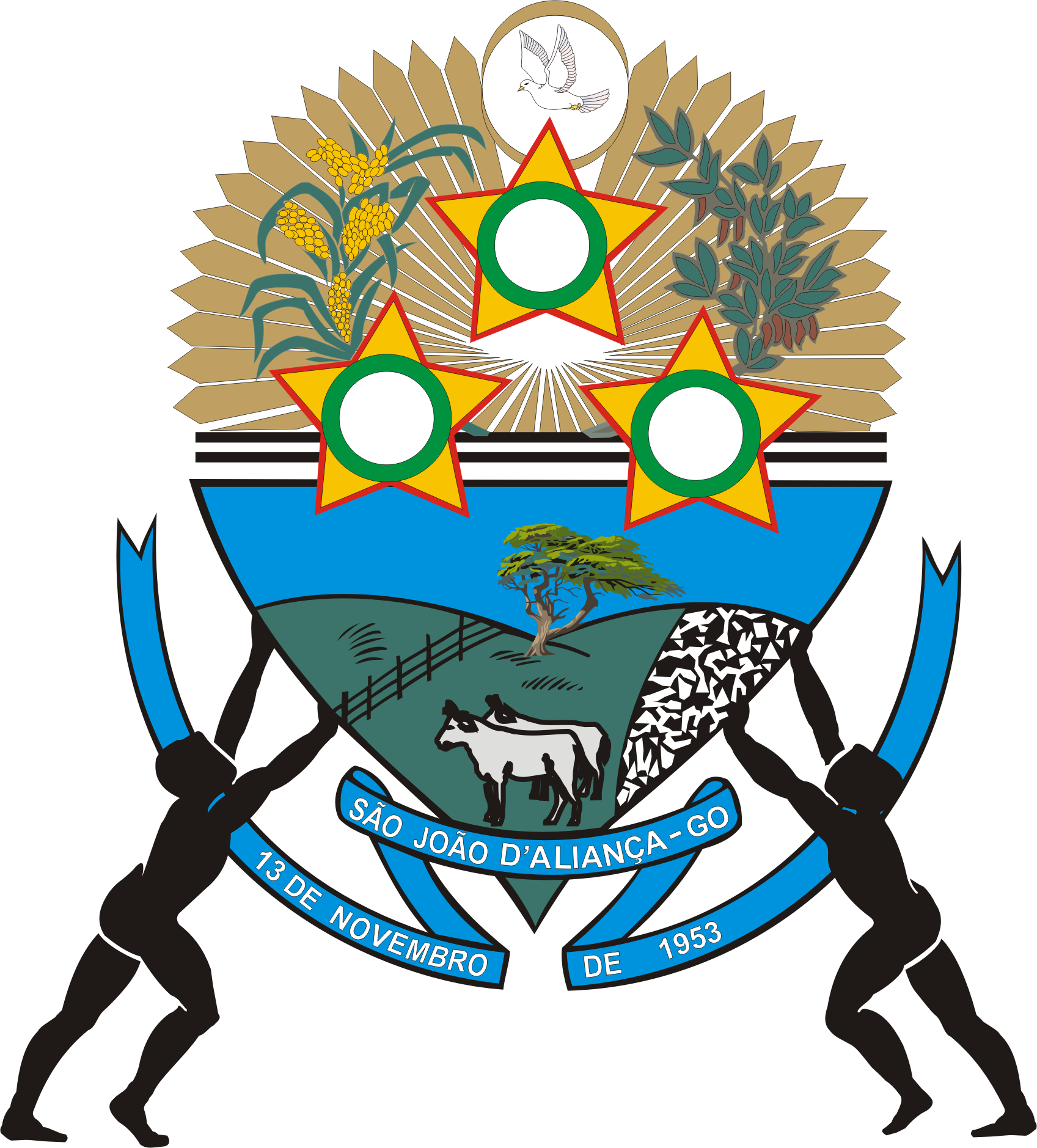
- Flag Coat of arms

- Location in Goiás state

- Location in Brazil
- Coordinates: 14°42′41″S 47°30′58″W
- Country: Brazil
- Region: Central-West
- State: Goiás
- Microregion: Chapada dos Veadeiros

Area
  - Total: 3,327.3 km^{2} (1,284.7 sq mi)
- Elevation: 986 m (3,235 ft)

Population (2020)
  - Total: 14,085
  - Density: 4.2332/km^{2} (10.964/sq mi)
- Time zone: UTC−3 (BRT)
- Postal code: 73760-000

São João d'Aliança is a municipality in northeastern Goiás state, Brazil. São João is a gateway to the Chapada dos Veadeiros National Park. The name is sometimes written as São João D'Aliança.

== Location ==
São João is located north of Brasília on state highway G0-118, which begins near Planaltina and connects with Alto Paraíso de Goiás. It is part of the Chapada dos Veadeiros Microregion. The distance to the state capital, Goiânia is 357 km. Highway connections from Goiânia are made by BR-153 / Anápolis / BR-060 / Alexânia / Planaltina (DF) / GO-430 / Planaltina de Goiás (GO) / GO-118 / BR-010 /.

Neighboring municipalities are:

- North: Alto Paraíso de Goiás
- South: Formosa and Água Fria de Goiás
- East: Flores de Goiás
- West: Niquelândia

== The economy ==
The economy is based on agriculture (corn, soybeans, and manioc), cattle raising (64,800 head in 2006), services, public administration, and small transformation industries. The soils, altitude and climate are considered favorable for planting corn (7,000 hectares) and soybeans (19,000 hectares). Farmers harvest 15,000 sacks of corn per square kilometre, which is twice the national average. Usually corn is rotated with soybeans. There was one financial institution—Banco Itaú—in 2007.

In 2006 there were 893 farms with a total area of 133,134 ha., of which 2,590 ha. were permanent crops, 27,673 ha. were perennial crops, and 71,332 ha. were natural pasture. There were 2,550 persons dependent on agriculture. The number of tractors was 259.

== Health and education ==
- Hospitals: 01 with 24 beds (2007)
- Adult literacy rate: 84.0% (2000) (national average was 86.4%)
- Infant mortality rate: 26.56 (2000) (national average was 33.
- MHDI: 0.719
- State ranking: 177 (out of 242 municipalities)
- National ranking: 2,654 (out of 5,507 municipalities)

== Tourism ==
Tourism has become important in recent years with the proximity of the Chapada dos Veadeiros National Park. There are several waterfalls in the region, with the Cachoeira Extrema or Label being the highest: 130 meters of direct fall. It is still quite inaccessible and it is necessary to walk three hours to reach it. The vegetation and fauna are very rich in the area. In the cerrado there are a minimum of 837 species of birds and 161 species of mammals.

== History ==
São João began as a farm in the nineteenth century. In 1910, it was Arraial Capetinga, consisting of same grass huts, two houses covered with tiles, and a chapel dedicated to Saint John the Baptist. In 1931 it became a municipality only to revert to a district of Formosa in 1939. Finally in 1953 it was re-established as a municipality. With the construction of Brasília and a relative proximity to that important city, farmers from the south began to arrive and buy inexpensive land to plant soybeans.

== See also ==
- List of municipalities in Goiás
