= Sítio d'Abadia =

- Municipality
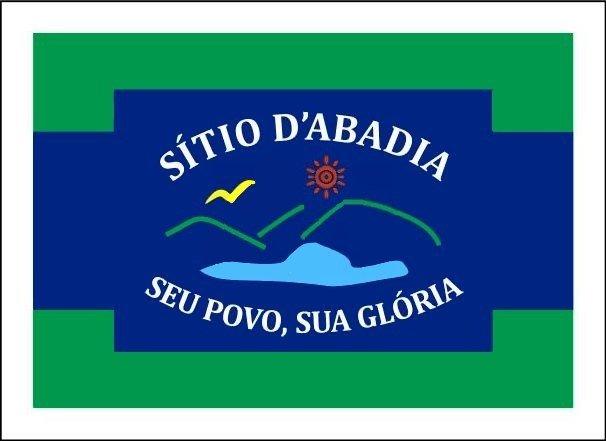
- Flag

- Location in Goiás state

- Location in Brazil
- Coordinates: 14°48′14″S 46°15′01″W
- Country: Brazil
- Region: Central-West
- State: Goiás
- Microregion: Vão do Paranã

Area
  - Total: 1,598.3 km^{2} (617.1 sq mi)
- Elevation: 748 m (2,454 ft)

Population (2020)
  - Total: 3,001
  - Density: 1.878/km^{2} (4.863/sq mi)
- Time zone: UTC−3 (BRT)
- Postal code: 73990-000

Sítio d'Abadia is a municipality in eastern Goiás state, Brazil.

== Location ==
Sítio d'Abadia is located in a corner of eastern Goiás, 14 kilometers north of the border with Minas Gerais. It is about 30 kilometers west of the border with Bahia. It is one of the most isolated towns in the state of Goiás, and can be accessed only by paved highway by driving north to Damianópolis. It belongs to the Vão do Paranã statistical micro-region.

The distance to Goiânia is 561 km. Highway connections are made by BR-153 / Anápolis / GO-060 / Alexânia / Planaltina / Formosa / GO-020 / BR-030 / Vila Boa / GO-112 Alvorada do Norte / Vila Capão / GO-236 / Buritinópolis / Mambaí / GO-108 / Damianópolis.

Municipal boundaries are with:

- north: Alvorada do Norte and Damianópolis
- west: Flores de Goiás
- south: Minas Gerais
- east: Bahia

== Demographics ==
- Population density: 2.03 inhabitants/km^{2} (2007)
- Urban/Rural population: 1,034/2,217
- Population growth rate 1996/2007: 1.07%

== Economy ==
The economy is based on modest services, public administration, agriculture and cattle raising. There were no banks and 13 commercial establishments in August 2007. There were 52 automobiles in 2007. In 2006 there were 29,000 head of cattle. The main agricultural products were rice, bananas, sugarcane, manioc, beans, corn, and soybeans (2,000 hectares planted).

- Motor vehicles: 80 (automobiles and pickup trucks)
- Number of inhabitants per motor vehicle: 41

Agricultural data 2006

- Farms: 499
- Total area: 90,612 ha.
- Area of permanent crops: 127 ha.
- Area of perennial crops: 5,272 ha.
- Area of natural pasture: 67,823 ha.
- Area of woodland and forests: 16,693 ha.
- Persons dependent on farming: 1,550
- Tractors: 97
- Cattle herd: 29,000
- Main crops: soybeans on 2,000 hectares

== Health and education ==
- Literacy rate: 74.4
- Infant mortality rate: 36.25 for 1000 live births
- Life expectancy:
- Hospitals: none
- Schools: 8 with 1,020 students

Sítio d'Abadia is a very poor town in one of the poorest areas of the state. In 2000 it was ranked 235 out of 242 municipalities in the state of Goiás on the United Nations Human Development Index with a score of 0.643. Nationally it was ranked 3,875 out of 5,507 municipalities.

== Tourism ==
Sítio d'Abadia has one of the largest waterfalls in the state located on the Rio Corrente. See Cachoeiras d'Abadia

== See also ==
- List of municipalities in Goiás
- Vão do Paranã Microregion
- Microregions in Goiás
