= Simolândia =

- Municipality
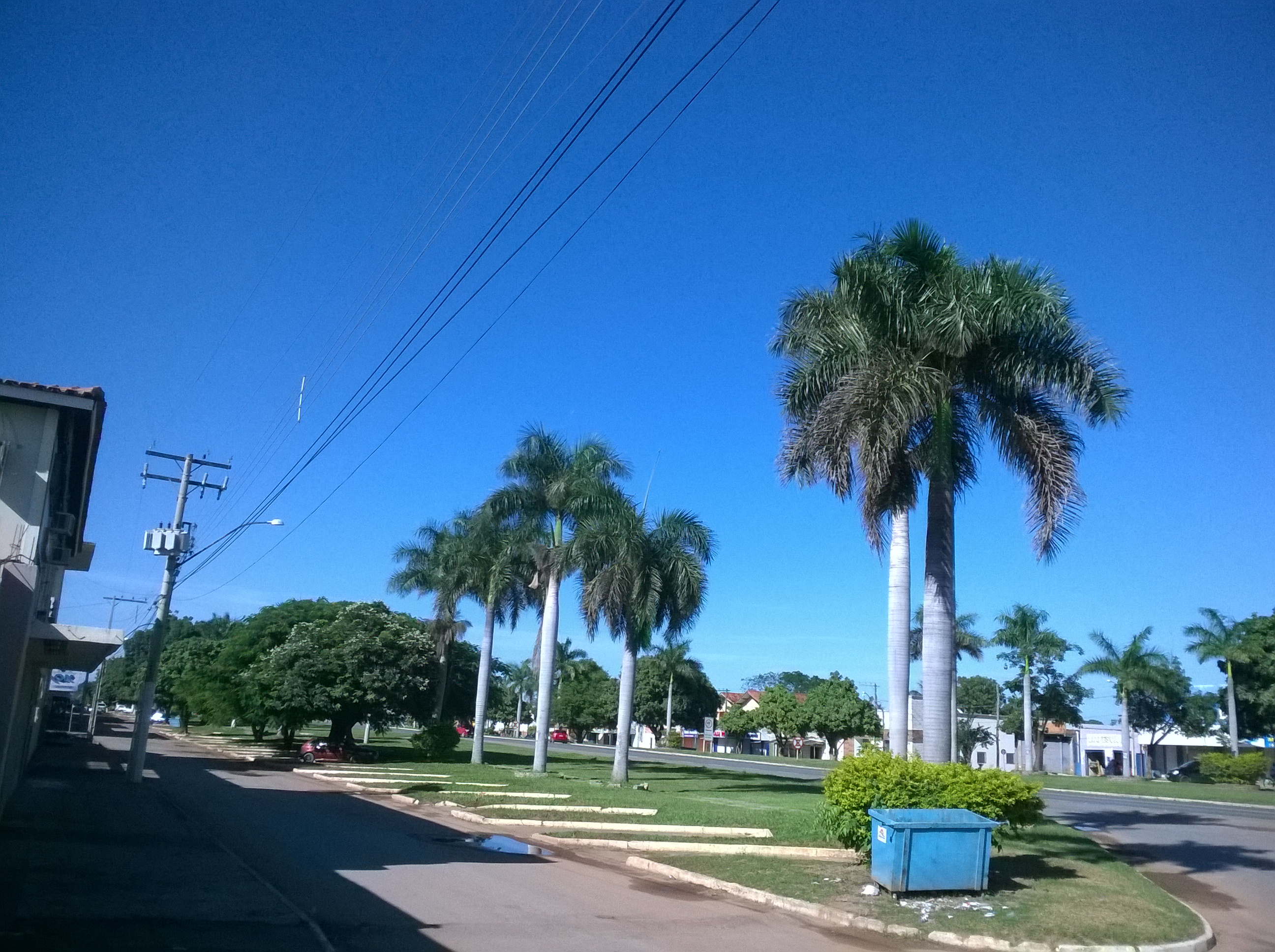

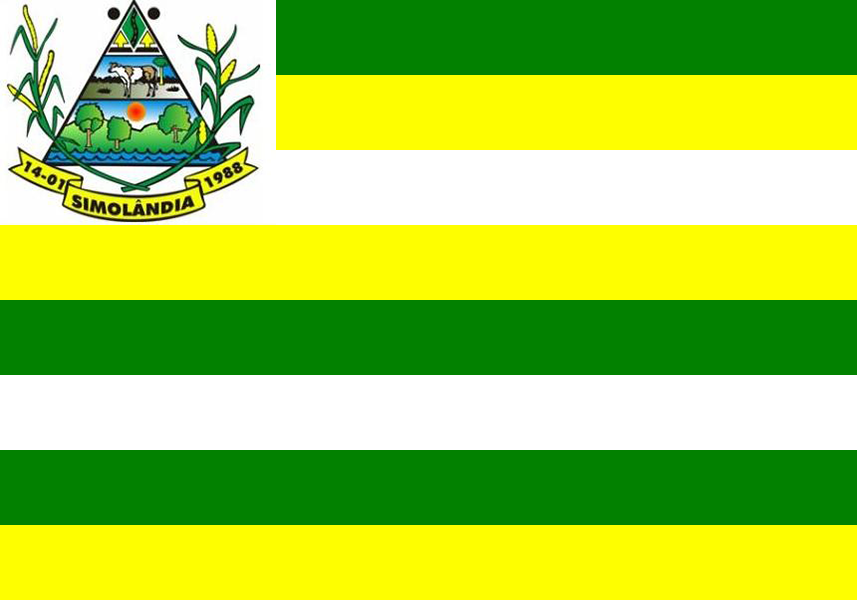
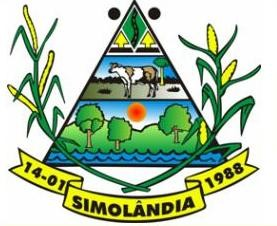
- Flag Coat of arms

- Location in Goiás state

- Location in Brazil
- Coordinates: 14°28′38″S 46°28′56″W
- Country: Brazil
- Region: Central-West
- State: Goiás
- Microregion: Vão do Paranã

Area
  - Total: 347.8 km^{2} (134.3 sq mi)
- Elevation: 500 m (1,600 ft)

Population (2020)
  - Total: 6,879
  - Density: 19.78/km^{2} (51.23/sq mi)
- Time zone: UTC−3 (BRT)
- Postal code: 73930-000

Simolândia is a municipality in northeast Goiás state, Brazil.

== Location and Geography ==
Simolândia is situated in the northeast of Goiás, at kilometer 250 of the important BR-020 (Belém-Brasília highway). It forms boundaries with Posse, Alvorada do Norte and Buritinópolis. It belongs to the Vão do Paranã statistical micro-region.

The distance to Goiânia is 460 km. Highway connections are made by BR-153 / Anápolis / BR-060 / Alexânia / Sobradinho / Planaltina / Formosa / BR-020 / BR-030 / BR-020 / Vila Boa / Alvorada do Norte.

The municipality lies mainly on the slopes of the Serra da Chapadinha and the topography is broken by several rivers: the Corrente, Salobro and Buriti, which are popular with tourists. The climate is hot and dry. The vegetation is made up of 60% forest and 40% savanna. Hardwoods are exported or used in the furniture industry.

== Demographic Information ==
- Population density: 19.88 inhabitants/km^{2} (2007)
- Urban population: 5,735 (2007)
- Rural population: 1,189 (2000)
- Population growth: a gain of about 1,000 people since 1991

== Economic Information ==
The economy is based on subsistence agriculture, cattle raising (19,100 head in 2006), services, public administration, and small transformation industries. There were no banks in 2007. There were 362 automobiles in 2007.

- Motor vehicles: 443 (automobiles and pickup trucks)
- Number of inhabitants per motor vehicle: 15

Agricultural data 2006

- Farms: 345
- Total area: 23,174 ha.
- Area of permanent crops: 255 ha.
- Area of perennial crops: 723 ha.
- Area of natural pasture: 14,657 ha.
- Area of woodland and forests: 7,432 ha.
- Persons dependent on farming: 950
- Tractors: 33
- Cattle herd: 19,100
- Main crops: 540 hectares

== Health and education ==
- Schools: 15
- Classrooms: 49
- Teachers: 110
- Students: 2,596 (2006)
- Hospitals: 1 with 16 beds (2007)
- Higher education: none
- Adult literacy rate: 76.1% (2000) (national average was 86.4%)
- Infant mortality rate: 33.48 (2000) (national average was 33.0)

Simolândia was ranked 233 out of 242 municipalities in the state of Goiás on the United Nations Human Development Index with a score of 0.657. Nationally it was ranked 3,649 out of 5,507 municipalities in 2000. (All data are from 2000.)

== See also ==
- List of municipalities in Goiás
- Microregions in Goiás
