= Damianópolis =

- Municipality
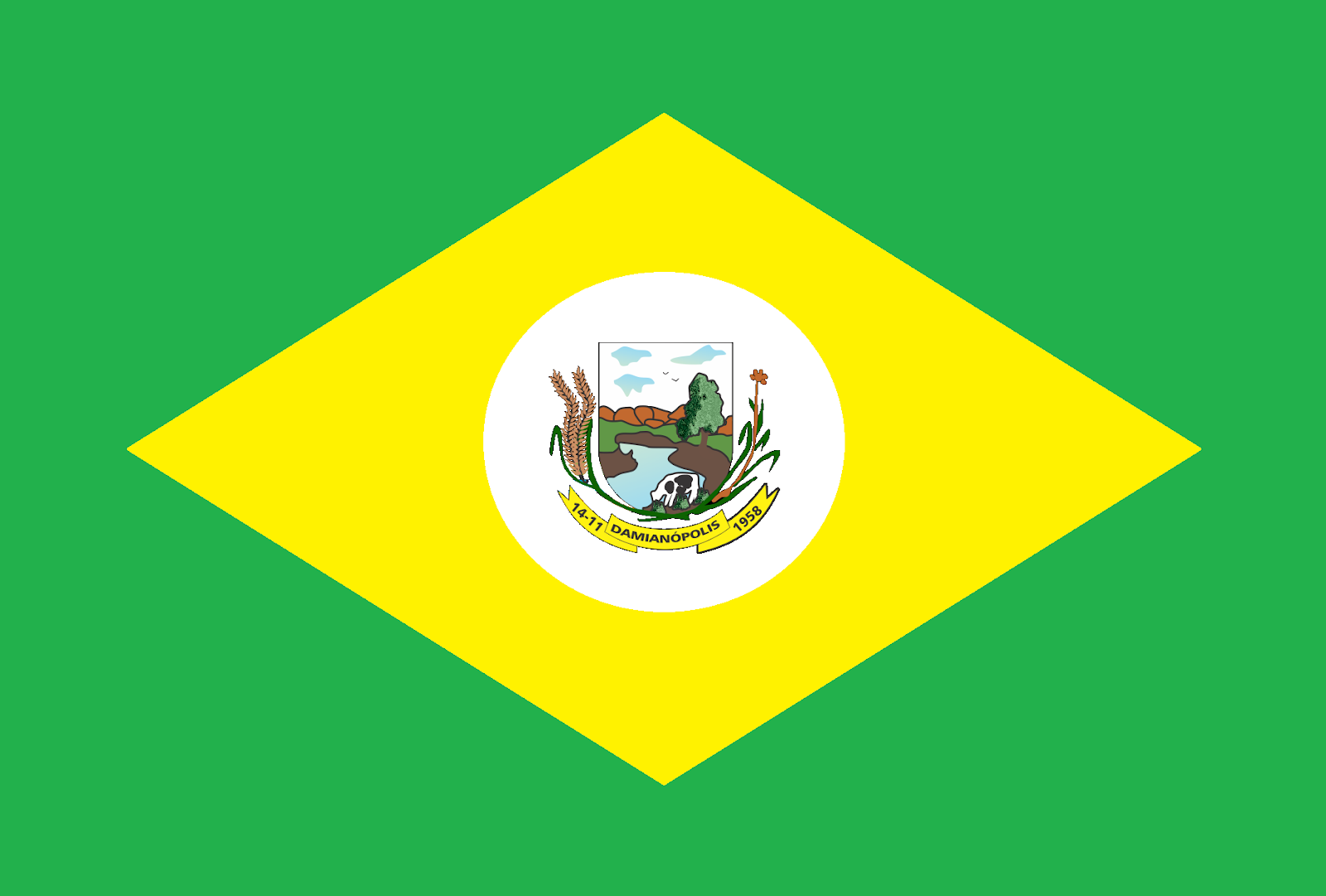
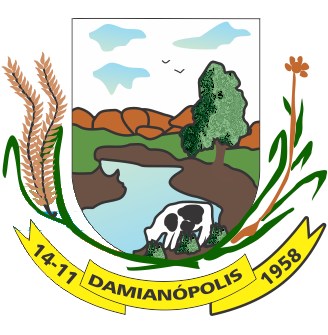
- Flag Coat of arms

- Location in Goiás state

- Location in Brazil
- Coordinates: 14°33′50″S 46°10′37″W
- Country: Brazil
- Region: Central-West
- State: Goiás
- Microregion: Vão do Paranã

Area
  - Total: 415.3 km^{2} (160.3 sq mi)
- Elevation: 746 m (2,448 ft)

Population (2020)
  - Total: 3,306
  - Density: 7.961/km^{2} (20.62/sq mi)
- Time zone: UTC−3 (BRT)
- Postal code: 73980-000

Damianópolis is a municipality in eastern Goiás state, Brazil. The population was 3,597 (2007) in a total area of 415.3 km^{2}.

== Location ==
Damianópolis is located to the east of the important BR-020 highway and west of the border with the state of Bahia. Connections with this highway are made by paved road by way of Mambaí.

Goiânia, the capital city of Goiás state, is 528 km away. Highway connections are made by BR-153 / Anápolis / GO-060 / Alexânia / Planaltina / Formosa / GO-020 / BR-030 / Vila Boa / Alvorada do Norte / GO-236 / Buritinópolis / Mambaí / GO-108.

Municipal boundaries are with:

- north: Buritinópolis and Mambaí
- west: Alvorada do Norte
- south: Sítio d'Abadia

== Demographics ==
- Population density: 8.44 inhabitants/km^{2} (2007)
- Total population in 1980: 3,528
- Total population in 2007: 3,507
- Urban population: 1,846
- Rural population: 1,661
- Population growth: -0.08% 1996/2007

== Economy ==
The economy is based on cattle raising (24,400 head in 2006) and agriculture, especially the growing of soybeans and corn.

- Industrial units: 0
- Retail commercial units: 35
- Motor vehicles (Automobiles and pickup trucks): 105 (2007)
- Number of inhabitants per motor vehicle: 33.4 (2007)

Agricultural data 2006

- Farms: 421
- Total area: 28,708 ha.
- Area of permanent crops: 47 ha.
- Area of perennial crops: 1,743 ha.
- Area of natural pasture: 23,313 ha.
- Area of woodland and forests: 3,050 ha.
- Persons dependent on farming: 1,300
- Number of tractors: 46
- Cattle herd: 24,400
- Main crop: corn with 600 hectares planted

== Education and health ==
- Literacy rate: 75.6%
- Infant mortality rate: 41.7 in 1,000 live births
- Schools: 12
- Classrooms: 32
- Teachers: 67
- Students: 1,147
- Hospitals: 01 with 14 beds
- Public health clinics (SUS): 02

Ranking on the United Nations Human Development Index

In 2000 Damianópolis was ranked 237 out of 242 municipalities in the state of Goiás on the United Nations Human Development Index with a score of 0.634.

- Life expectancy: 63.176
- Adult literacy: 0.718
- School attendance rate: 0.807
- HDI-M: 0.634
- State ranking: 237 (out of 242 municipalities in 2000)
- National ranking: 4,047 (out of 5,507 municipalities in 2000)

== See also ==
- List of municipalities in Goiás
- Microregions of Goiás
- Vão do Paranã Microregion
