= Lapa Terra Ronca =

- Caverna Terra Ronca I
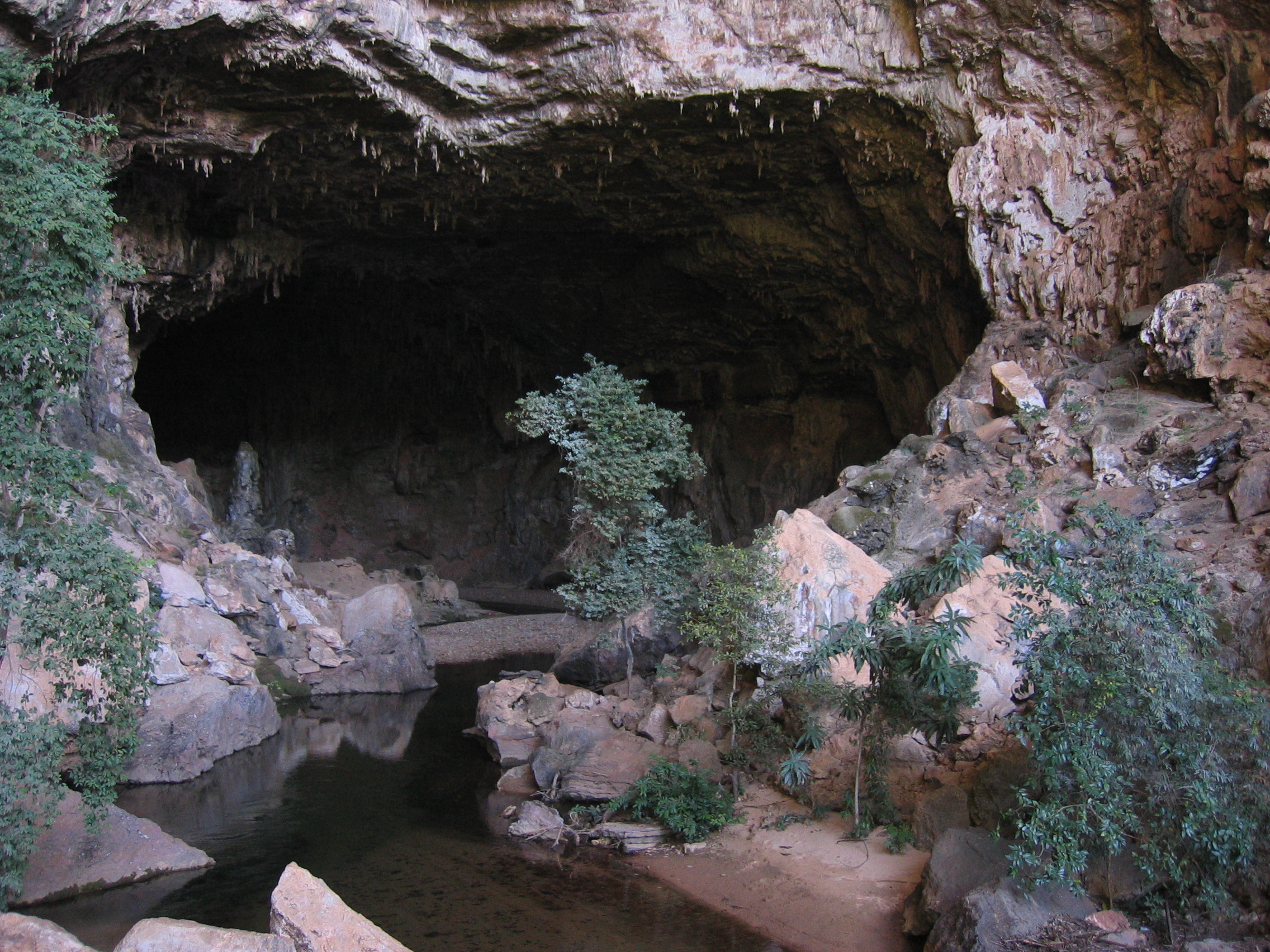
- Caverna Terra Ronca

- Location within Brazil
- Location: São Domingos, Posse & Guarani de Goiás, Goiás
- Coordinates: 13°44′4″S 46°21′28″W
- Length: 760 m (2,490 ft)
- Geology: Dolomitic limestone

Lapa Terra Ronca or Caverna Terra Ronca I (GO-063), is a dolomitic limestone cave inside the area of the Terra Ronca State Park, which houses the largest collection of caves and grottoes in the midwest with a number of about 200 being that only Terra Ronca and Angelica are open for the tourists. It is located about 400 kilometers from Brasília, midway between the municipalities of São Domingos, Posse e Guarani de Goiás, in the State of Goiás, Brazil.

Thousands of years ago, a landslide caused its division into two parts. The first can be visited easily, but the second part requires a tour guide. It's called Terra Ronca II or Malhada, also of gigantic proportions. It has two skylights, one of them called Araras and a large gallery called Lovers' Hall decorated with rich stalactites and stalagmites and huge sand dunes crossed by the underground Lapa river.

== Geology ==
Indeed, geologists working for the state park say that the whole area where the cave is located was sea bottom about 600 million years, considering the many sea shells found around the area. It was formed by the continuous action of rain water and the Lapa River that comes down from the Serra Geral. Its name comes from the roaring sound produced by this river running through its 5.8 kilometres (3.6 mi) long route the two craters on the surface arisen from seismic activity millions of years ago, many halls of stalactites and stalagmites of impressive dimensions of up to 150,000 square metres (1,600,000 sq ft) and columns with more than 590 meters high.

Terra Ronca has a cave mouth of 96 metres (315 ft) high and 120 metres (390 ft) wide, with an altar measuring 760 metres (2,490 ft) long and 100 metres (330 ft) high where the religious ceremony of Bom Jesus da Lapa da Terra Ronca takes place at the beginning of August.

The Salão dos Namorados (English: Lovers Hall), besides the ceiling of the cave shaped in the form of a clock, the Oco das Araras, a fantastic place where many parrots live, and Clarabóia, another output of Terra Ronca for those who do not want to stay longer inside the cave are other highlights found here. There are several other output options like the Pesqueiro 1 and 2.

== See also ==
- List of caves in Brazil
  - Buraco das Araras (Goiás)
  - Gruta do Centenário
