= Divinópolis de Goiás =

- Municipality
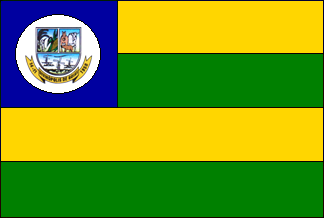
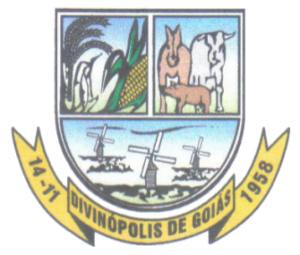
- Flag Coat of arms

- Location in Goiás state

- Location in Brazil
- Coordinates: 13°17′36″S 46°23′46″W
- Country: Brazil
- Region: Central-West
- State: Goiás
- Microregion: Vão do Paranã

Area
  - Total: 831.134 km^{2} (320.903 sq mi)
- Elevation: 620 m (2,030 ft)

Population (2020)
  - Total: 4,778
  - Density: 5.749/km^{2} (14.89/sq mi)
- Time zone: UTC−3 (BRT)
- Postal code: 73865-000

Divinópolis de Goiás is a municipality in northeastern Goiás state, Brazil.

== Geography ==
Divinópolis de Goiás is part of the Vão do Paranã statistical micro-region, which consists of 12 municipalities with 88,913 inhabitants in a total area of 17,452.90 km^{2}. Divinópolis is one of the farthest towns from the state capital and one of the most isolated and poorest. The distance to Goiânia is 642 km. Highway connections are made by BR-153 / Anápolis / Alexânia / BR-060 / Planaltina / GO-430 / GO-118 / BR-010 / São João da Aliança / Alto Paraíso de Goiás / Teresina de Goiás / Monte Alegre de Goiás / GO-447 / Vazante. (64 km. unpaved road).

It is part of the diocese of Formosa, a diocese that has an area of 47,604.7 km^{2} and a population of 285,427 inhabitants. There are only 23 priests and 45 nuns for this area.

It is bordered in the north by the state of Tocantins and in the east and south by the municipality of São Domingos.

- Villages (povoados): Monte Santo
- Hamlets (Aglomerados): Mangabeira, Porteiras and Vazante

== Demographics ==
- Population density: 6.43 inhabitants/km^{2}
- Total population in 1980: 4,244
- Total population in 2007: 5,344
- Urban population: 3,116
- Rural population: 2,228
- Population growth rate: 0.58%

== The economy ==
The most important economic activities are cattle raising and modest production of rice, bananas, sugarcane, and corn. In 2007 there were 51 commercial units. There were no banks.

- Motor vehicles (automobiles and pickup trucks): 117 (2007)
- Number of inhabitants per motor vehicle: 45.6

Agricultural data 2006

- Farms: 314
- Total area: 81,731 ha.
- Area of permanent crops: 246 ha.
- Area of perennial crops: 1,753 ha.
- Area of pasture: 45,641 ha.
- Area of woodland and forests: 30,202 ha.
- People dependent on agriculture: 1,100
- Cattle herd: 58,277

== Health and education ==
- Literacy rate: 74.8%
- Infant mortality rate: 23.93 in 1,000 live births
- Hospitals: 01 (2007)
- Hospital beds: 26
- Schools: 9 with 1,895 students

Divinópolis de Goiás was ranked 224 out of 242 municipalities in the state of Goiás on the United Nations Human Development Index with a score of 0.675 (data from 2000). Nationally it was ranked 3,375 out of 5,507 municipalities. Data are from 2000.

== History ==
The settlement of the region began in 1880 with the Galheiros Ranch, owned by Inácia Ferreira Lima, who incentivated the arrival of settlers from the state of Bahia. Lands were donated to build a chapel to São João Bautista (Saint John the Baptist) and soon houses began to appear. In 1890 the village (povoado) was raised to the status of district belonging to São Domingos with the name of Galheiros, taking the name of the ranch with the same name. In 1958 it separated and became a municipality with the same name. This was changed to Cirinópolis in 1964 in honor of Luis Pereira Cirino, who had fought hard to make it a municipality. Later, in 1989 the name was changed to Divinópolis de Goiás.

== See also ==
- List of municipalities in Goiás
- Microregions of Goiás
