= Alvorada do Norte =

- Municipality
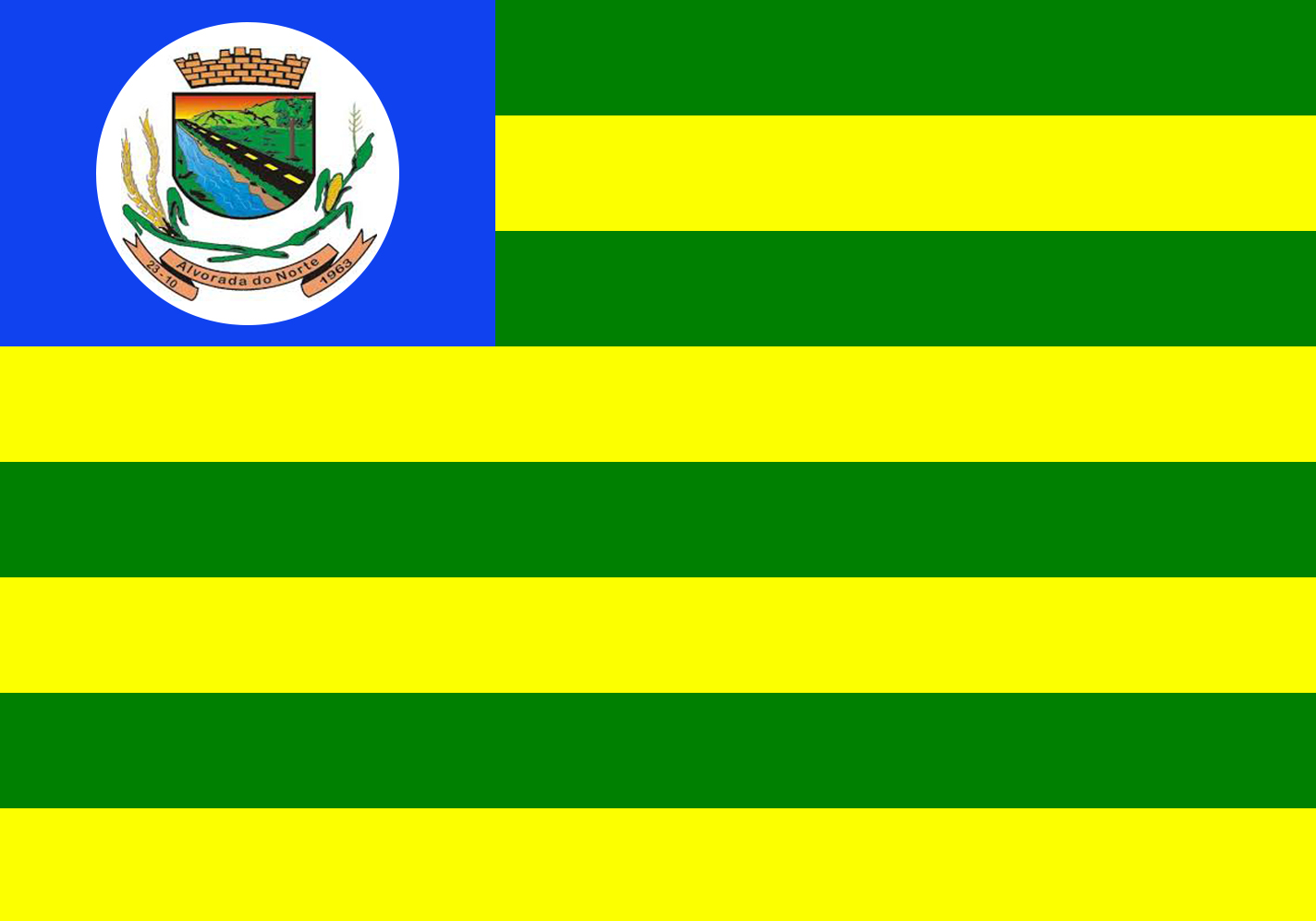
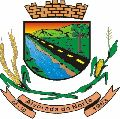
- Flag Coat of arms

- Location in Goiás state

- Location in Brazil
- Coordinates: 14°29′01″S 46°29′42″W
- Country: Brazil
- Region: Central-West
- State: Goiás
- Microregion: Vão do Paranã

Area
  - Total: 1,296.6 km^{2} (500.6 sq mi)
- Elevation: 490 m (1,610 ft)

Population (2020)
  - Total: 8,705
  - Density: 6.714/km^{2} (17.39/sq mi)
- Time zone: UTC−3 (BRT)
- Postal code: 73950-000

Alvorada do Norte is a municipality in northeastern Goiás state, Brazil. It is an important commercial center on the Brasília-Salvador highway.

== Location ==
Alvorada do Norte is part of the Vão do Paranã Microregion. Neighboring municipalities are Iaciara, Posse, Simolândia, Buritinópolis, Sítio d'Abadia, Damianópolis, and Flores de Goiás. The distance to Goiânia is 457 km. and highway connections are made by BR-153 / Anápolis / BR-060 / Alexânia / Planaltina / Formosa / BR-020. Brasília is 250 km. away.

== History ==
The town of Alvorada do Norte appeared in 1958, created by the authorities of the town of Sítio d'Abadia. They knew that the valley of the Paranã River would be the future route of the new federal highway BR-020 and that it would link the Brazilian Northeast to the new capital of Brasília, so they founded a new town on the edge of the future highway.

A curious fact is that Hermeliano Alves de Brito, who had been mayor of Sítio D’Abadia, was behind the move since his candidate had lost the election in Sítio. He had the complete support of Mauro Borges, state governor at the time.

As late as 1976, Alvorada was quite isolated from the rest of the country. The small town lived off of the hardwoods extracted from the abundant forests nearby. From Alvorada to Formosa there was not even any asphalt and there was neither television nor telephone. Located on the banks of the Rio Corrente, it is an obligatory stop for all those travelling between the states of the north and the south. People came from all around to start shops or to look for work. Soon other economic activities began such as rice, bean, corn, and manioc cultivation, taking advantage of the fertile soils. Cattle raising did not take long to become an important part of the economy.

Nearby is Itiquira or (Itiquirinha) waterfall, with a height of 70 meters. Curiously the name Itiquira is the same as the much higher waterfall in the municipality of Formosa.

== Economy ==
The economy is mainly dependent on agriculture and services. Main agricultural activities (2006) were cattle raising and agriculture (corn and soybeans). In 2007 there were 93 retail units and three banks—Banco do Brasil S.A, BRADESCO S.A., and Banco Itaú S.A. The main employer in the town was commerce and then small transformation industries (furniture making, wood processing, cereal transforming). Agriculture was the largest source of employment with 1,150 persons dependent on this livelihood. and

Motor vehicles in 2006

- Automobiles: 670
- Pickup trucks: 122
- Trucks: 103
- Buses: 4
- Motorcycle: 336
- Number of inhabitants per automobile and pickup truck: 10.37

Agricultural data 2006

- Farms: 298
- Total area: 65,952 ha.
- Area of permanent crops: 124 ha.
- Area of perennial crops: 1,741 ha.
- Area of pasture: 44,388 ha.
- Area of woodland and forests: 14,303 ha.
- Cattle herd: 34,523 head

== Health and education ==
- Infant mortality rate in 2000: 36.25
- Hospitals: 01 with 30 beds (2006)
- Literacy rate in 2000: 80.5%
- Schools: 14 with 3,244 students

Alvorada do Norte is ranked 218 out of 242 municipalities in the state of Goiás on the United Nations 2000 Human Development Index with a score of 0.688. Nationally it is ranked 3,179 out of 5,507 municipalities (2000).

== See also ==
- List of municipalities in Goiás
- Microregions of Goiás
- Vão do Paranã Microregion
