= Buritinópolis =

- Municipality
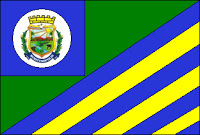
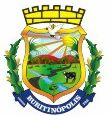
- Flag Coat of arms

- Location in Goiás state

- Location in Brazil
- Coordinates: 14°28′29″S 46°24′54″W
- Country: Brazil
- Region: Central-West
- State: Goiás
- Microregion: Vão do Paranã

Area
  - Total: 268.1 km^{2} (103.5 sq mi)
- Elevation: 550 m (1,800 ft)

Population (2020)
  - Total: 3,283
  - Density: 12.25/km^{2} (31.72/sq mi)
- Time zone: UTC−3 (BRT)
- Postal code: 73975-000

Buritinópolis is a municipality in eastern Goiás state, Brazil. It is the poorest municipality in the state.

== Location ==
Buritinópolis is located in the Vão do Paranã statistical micro-region in the area near Simolândia and Alvorada do Norte. It is close to the important BR-020 highway, which connects Brasília with Salvador. Neighboring municipalities are Posse, Simolândia, Alvorada do Norte, Mambaí, and Damianópolis. The distance to Goiânia is 466 km. Highway connections are made by BR-153 / Anápolis / Alexânia / BR-060 / Planaltina / Formosa / BR-020 / Simolândia / GO-236.

== Demographics ==
- Geometric Growth Rate 1996/2007: 0.17%
- Population density: 12.84 inhabitants/km^{2}
- Urban population: 1,842
- Rural population: 1,600

== Economy ==
The main economic activities are cattle raising for meat and farming, especially soybeans and corn. Most of the inhabitants either have no work or are employed in subsistence farming. In 2007 there were 15 commercial units and no banks. The absence of investments in the town leaves the inhabitants without the chance of a job and many, mainly the young, leave the town to try to find a job that would allow them to survive. There were no hospitals in 2007. There were 100 automobiles in 2007, which was one automobile for every 34 inhabitants.

Agricultural data 2006

- Farms: 310
- Total area: 6,772 ha.
- Area of permanent crops: 116 ha.
- Area of perennial crops: 578 ha.
- Area of pasture: 3,750 ha.
- Area of woodland and forests: 1,814 ha.
- Persons dependent on farming: 1,000
- Cattle herd: 27,848

== Health and education ==
- Literacy rate: 71.9 in 2000.
- Infant mortality rate in 2000: 50.06
- Hospitals: none
- Schools: 8 with 1,240 students
- Ranking on the United Nations Municipal Human Development Index: 0.603 (in the lower tiers)
- State ranking: 242/242 (the worst in the state)
- National ranking: 4,612/5,507

In Buritinópolis, there is no bank branch, no restaurant, and no hotel. The two supermarkets are comparable to the little grocery stores in the slums of the large urban centers and the bars can only provide income for their owners. The agricultural activities provide few jobs since the small rural landowners practice subsistence farming and the large landowners opt for extensive cattle raising, which requires few workers.

Urban erosion is a worry for all. It has already destroyed a large part of the main avenue that runs parallel to BR-020, the highway that cuts the city in two. With no money to build drains and pave the streets on both side of the highway, the city government is waiting for help from the state government.

== See also ==
- List of municipalities in Goiás
- Microregions of Goiás
- Vão do Paranã Microregion
