= Iaciara =

- Municipality
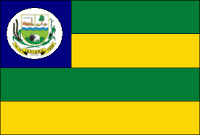
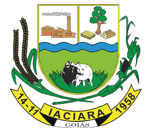
- Flag Coat of arms

- Location in Goiás state

- Location in Brazil
- Coordinates: 14°06′38″S 46°37′36″W
- Country: Brazil
- Region: Central-West
- State: Goiás
- Microregion: Vão do Paranã

Area
  - Total: 1,625.2 km^{2} (627.5 sq mi)
- Elevation: 500 m (1,600 ft)

Population (2020)
  - Total: 14,082
  - Density: 8.6648/km^{2} (22.442/sq mi)
- Time zone: UTC−3 (BRT)
- Postal code: 73920-000

Iaciara is a municipality in northeastern Goiás state, Brazil.

== Geography ==
Iaciara is located in Vão do Paranã statistical micro-region, which borders the state of Bahia. The distance to the state capital of Goiânia is 548 kilometers. Highway connections are made by BR-153 / Anápolis / GO-060 / Alexânia / Formosa / BR-020 / Alvorada do Norte / GO-112 for 58 km.

The municipality has boundaries with Posse, Alvorada do Norte, Guarani de Goiás, Nova Roma and São Domingos, and contains the following settlements: Claretiana, Extrema, Levantado and Água Quente.

The rivers that cross the municipality are: the Paranã, Água Quente, São Bernardo and Prata.

== Economics ==
The main economic activities are cattle raising and agriculture (rice, beans, corn and bananas). In 2007 there were 6 small transformation industries and 114 retail establishments. There was one bank.

- Motor vehicles: 644 (automobiles and pickup trucks)
- Inhabitants per motor vehicle: 20

Agricultural data 2006

- Farms: 669
- Total area: 35,787 ha.
- Area of permanent crops: 125 ha.
- Area of perennial crops: 114 ha.
- Area of natural pasture: 23,873 ha.
- Area of woodland and forests: 10,923 ha.
- Persons dependent on farming: 2,500
- Cattle herd: 142,000
- Main crop: corn (1500 hectares in 2006)

== Health and education ==
- Literacy rate: 79.5% (2000)
- Infant mortality rate: 20.46 in 1,000 live births

There were 17 schools and one hospital with 22 beds (2006).

Iaciara is ranked 206 out of 242 municipalities in the state of Goiás on the United Nations Human Development Index with a score of 0.704. Nationally it is ranked 2,925 out of 5,507 municipalities.

== History ==
The history of Iaciara began on 13 June 1881 when, at the Boa Vista ranch, the slave Miguel Cardoso da Conceiçao called for a prayer in the name of Santo Antonio. Since this prayer became traditional the owner of the ranch, Protassio de Souza, had structures of palm built to shelter the pilgrims. Nevertheless, Isidoro Teixeira, the first settler to build his house there, is considered to be the founder of the town. In 1885 the first house covered by tiles was built and the village was called Boa Vista. Later it was changed to Iracema. In 1887 the village was raised to the category of district with the name Iaciara, an Indian word of unknown origin. In 1958 Iaciara was dismembered from Posse and became a municipality.

== See also ==
- List of municipalities in Goiás
- Vão do Paranã Microregion
- Microregions in Goiás
