= Flores de Goiás =

- Municipality
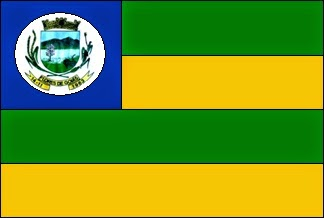
- Flag

- Location in Goiás state

- Location in Brazil
- Coordinates: 14°27′38″S 47°01′54″W
- Country: Brazil
- Region: Central-West
- State: Goiás
- Microregion: Vão do Paranã

Area
  - Total: 3,709.4 km^{2} (1,432.2 sq mi)
- Elevation: 440 m (1,440 ft)

Population (2010)
  - Total: 12,066
  - Density: 3.2528/km^{2} (8.4248/sq mi)
- Time zone: UTC−3 (BRT)
- Postal code: 73890-000

Flores de Goiás is a municipality in northeastern Goiás state, Brazil.

== Geography ==
Located in the Vão do Paranã statistical micro-region, Flores has boundaries with Buritis, Sítio d'Abadia, Vila Boa, Alvorada do Norte, Iaciara, Nova Roma, São João d'Aliança, Formosa and Alto Paraíso de Goiás.

The distance to Goiânia is 438 km. Highway connections with Goiânia are made by BR-153 / Anápolis / GO-060 / Alexânia / Planaltina / Formosa / GO-020 / BR-030 / Vila Boa / GO-114.

The Rio Paranã supplies much of the water for irrigation of the crops and filling up of small dams for livestock raising. Other rivers of importance are: Macacos, Piripiri, Santa Maria, Corrente, Canabrava, Bonifácio, Gameleira and Macacão.

The relief is varied with a mixture of mountains, plains, and uplands. The main climate is semi-humid hot tropical, with four to five dry months. The vegetation still shows traces of native tropical forest.

== Demographics ==
- Population density: 2.80 inhabitants/km^{2}
- Total population in 1980: 3,888
- Total population in 2007: 10,382
- Urban population: 2,875
- Rural population: 7,507
- Population growth rate: 6.21%

== Economy ==
The economy is still based on large ranch holdings. Cattle raising is the main occupation followed by swine, sheep and poultry raising. Cattle are sold in Formosa, Brasília, and São Paulo. Most of the big cattle ranchers as well as the planters are from the south of the country. They are either Gaúchos or Parananeses. Almost all of the cattle raised are Nelore. They raise cattle to fatten them and then they sell them in large auctions in Formosa. Other farmers from the south have planted irrigated rice, soybeans, and corn, but Flores is still known as cattle country.

Economic Data

- Industrial establishments: 0
- Retail commercial establishments: 42
- Motor vehicles (automobiles and pickup trucks): 240 (2007)
- Inhabitants per motor vehicle: 43.2 (2007)

Main agricultural production in planted area

- Rice: 5,300 ha.
- Banana: 16 ha.
- Sugarcane: 14 ha.
- Beans: 300 ha.
- Manioc: 80 ha.
- Corn: 5.000 ha.
- Soybeans: 2,500

Agricultural data 2006

- Farms: 1,625
- Total area: 199,700 ha.
- Area of permanent crops: 1,112 ha.
- Area of perennial crops: 15,413 ha.
- Area of natural pasture: 119,373 ha.
- Area of woodland and forests: 48,951 ha.
- Persons dependent on farming: 2,000
- Cattle herd: 186,109

== Health and education ==
- Municipal Human Development Index: 0.642
- State ranking: 236 (out of 242 municipalities in 2000)
- National ranking: 3,888 (out of 5,507 municipalities in 2000) (All data are from 2000.)
- Hospitals: 1 with 7 beds (4 public health clinics)
- Schools: 21 with 3,290 students

== History ==
Flores began in 1838 as a district of the now extinct municipality of Forte. In 1907 the district was transferred to the municipality of Sítio d'Abadia. In 1953 the name was changed to Urutagua and finally in 1963 the name was changed again to Flores de Goiás and it became its own municipality.

== See also ==
- List of municipalities in Goiás
