= Itiquira Falls =

Brazilian waterfall

Coordinates: 15.366°S 47.457°W

Itiquira Falls

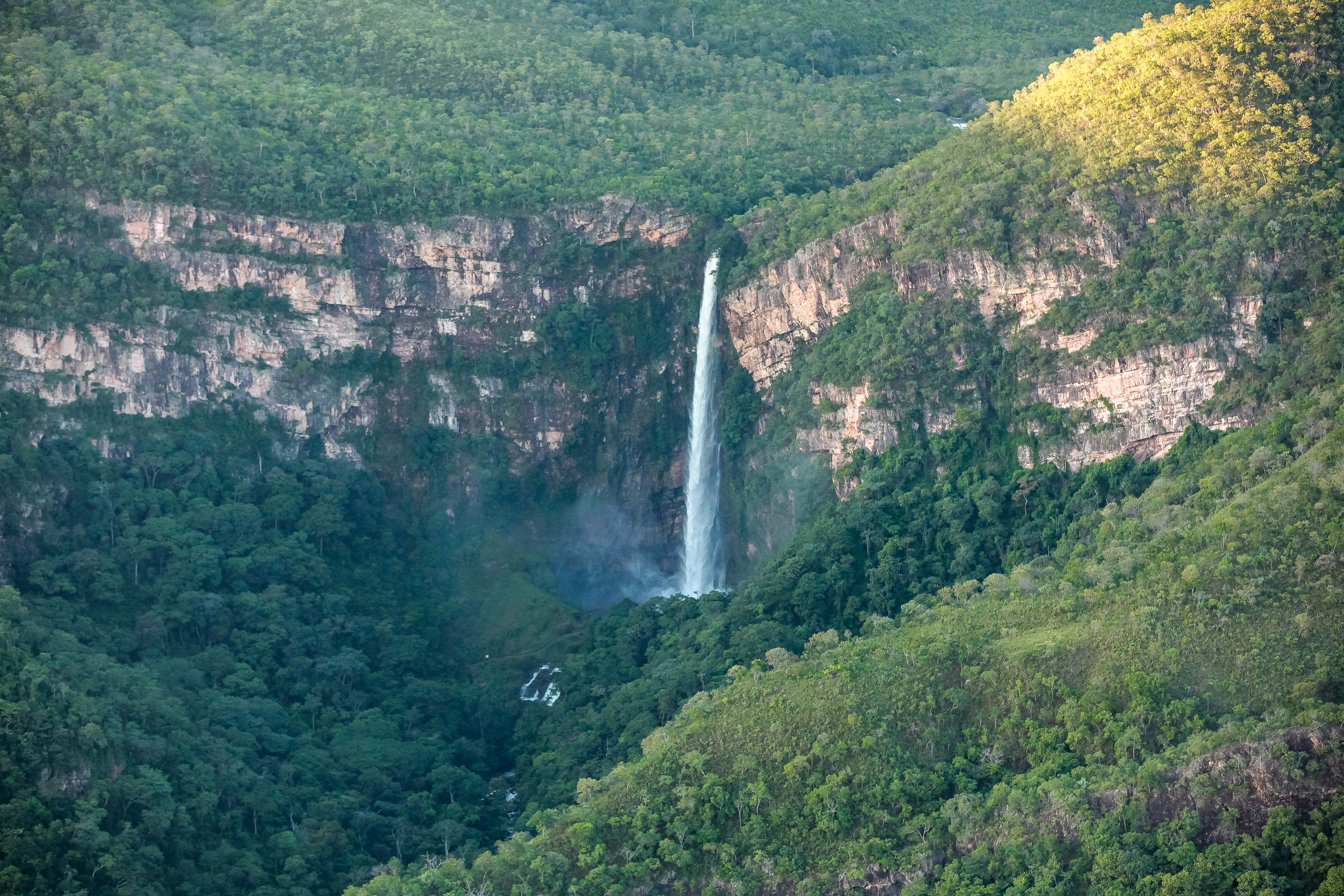
Itiquira Falls

The Itiquira Falls is a waterfall in Brazil. They are located 34 kilometers north of Formosa in the state of Goiás and 115 kilometers from Brasília on a paved road. The falls have a height of 168 meters, making them possibly the highest accessible waterfall in Brazil and the second highest overall. The falls are formed by the drop of the Itiquira River from the higher central plateau north of Formosa into the deep Paranã River valley. The waters are unpolluted and a bottling plant is located on the river above the falls (access from a different road heading north from Formosa towards Planaltina de Goiás).

The area is a municipal park and is protected from development. There are tourist facilities outside the park, near the entrance.
