= Buraco das Araras (Goiás) =

Sinkhole in Goiás, Brazil

Buraco Das Araras - Dolina dos Maracanas
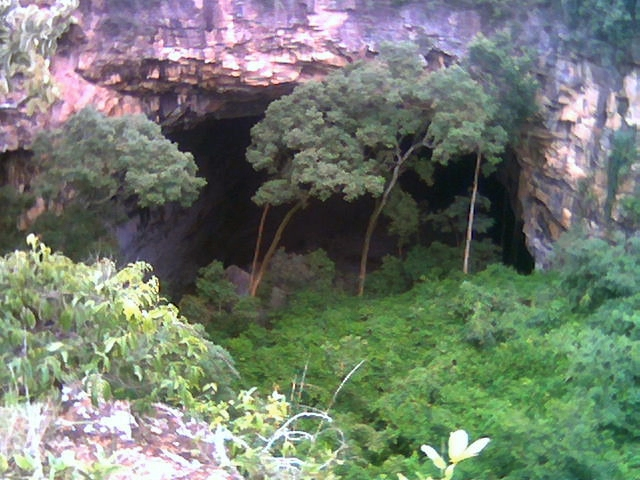
- Buraco das Araras, GO

- Location within Brazil
- Location: Formosa, Goiás
- Coordinates: 15°23′1″S 47°6′54″W
- Depth: 105 m (344 ft)
- Length: 295 m (968 ft)
- Discovery: 1912
- Geology: Quartzite
- Translation: Hole of the Macaws (Portuguese)

Buraco das Araras - Dolina dos Maracanas (BR-020) (English: Hole of the Macaws) is one of the largest quartzitic caves located in the State of Goiás, Brazil. It is located about 120 kilometres (75 mi) west of Brasília and 16 kilometres (9.9 mi) from the district of Bezerra, in the municipality of Formosa. It is considered one of the largest sinkholes (dolinas) in the world.

== Description ==
Discovered in 1912, it is believed that the hole has been formed by the collapse of the roof of a cave. The cave itself is 105 metres (344 ft) deep and 295 metres (968 ft) wide, having in its midst a dense rainforest with gigantic ferns typical of a primitive age.

== Getting there ==
To reach it the traveler must travel 41 kilometres (25 mi) from Formosa, following BR-020 north as far as the village of Bezerra. Four kilometers after the settlement, one should turn left and drive on a dirt road for 7 kilometres (4.3 mi) and then turn left for two more kilometers.

== See also ==
- List of caves in Brazil
  - Gruta do Centenário
  - Lapa Terra Ronca
