= Gruta do Centenário =

- Location within Brazil
- Location: Mariana, Minas Gerais
- Coordinates: 20°8′1″S 43°27′3″W
- Depth: 481 m (1,578 ft)
- Discovery: 1922
- Geology: Quartzite
- Features: Largest & deepest quartzite cave in the world
- Translation: Centenary grotto (Portuguese)
- Cave survey: 1952

Gruta do Centenário (English: Centenary grotto) (MG-1081), is a cave located in the municipality of Mariana, in the state of Minas Gerais, Brazil. It is the largest and deepest quartzite cave in the world, and second in the country in terms of unevenness. Other caves which are part of the same system have now been partially explored.

== History ==
The beginnings of the Brazilian speleology in the eighteenth and nineteenth century mingle with the history of Caraça. From 1818 reports of two European naturalists, Johann Baptist von Spix and Carl Friedrich Philipp von Martius, cited the existence of several caves in the Serra do Caraça. About this place, it is said that in 1922 the priests of the Caraça College had discovered at the Inficionado peak, which stands 2,068 metres (6,785 ft) above sea level, the Centenary grotto whose first speleological data appeared for the first time only in 1952 when a more technical survey took place resulting in a 3,790 horizontal projection (4,700 linear meters) and a vertical drop of 481 metres (1,578 ft) with several entrances, almost always in the form of pits.

Six more caves have been explored: Centenário II, with 20 meters of horizontal projection, Centenário III, formed by two parallel galleries connected by a narrow duct, Centum, Bloco Suspenso, which presents small depths of up to 20 meters, Fumaça and Bocaina with 960 meters of horizontal projection (1,200 linear meters) and 304 meters of unevenness. The altitude of these cave mouths range from 2,051 meters at the top slot, 1,958 meters at the usual entrance to the cave to 1,881 meters at the Inficionado abyss. So far three streams have been identified, the Inficionado stream, Chantilly and Areião. All ducts are narrow, ranging between 30 cm and 10 meters for passages that usually lead to the galleries. Their height goes up to tens of meters, although in just a few the ceiling can be seen.

== See also ==
- List of caves in Brazil
  - Buraco das Araras (Goiás)
  - Lapa Terra Ronca
