= Microregion of Vão do Paranã =

Coordinates: 14°05′34″S 46°22′08″W

Vão do Paranã
- Microregion
- Location in Goias state
- Country: Brazil
- State: Goiás
- Mesoregion: Leste Goiano
- Municipalities: 12

Area
  - Total: 17,452.90 km^{2} (6,738.60 sq mi)

Population (2007)
  - Total: 102,927
  - Density: 5.9/km^{2} (15/sq mi)

The Vão do Paranã is a statistical micro-region created by IBGE (Instituto Brasileiro de Geografia e Estatística) in northeastern Goiás state, Brazil.

== Municipalities ==
The microregion consists of the following municipalities:

Name	Population (2007)
Alvorada do Norte	8,217
Buritinópolis	3,442
Damianópolis	3,507
Divinópolis de Goiás	5,344
Flores de Goiás	10,382
Guarani de Goiás	4,105
Iaciara	12,703
Mambaí	6,454
Posse	28,850
São Domingos	9,786
Simolândia	6,915
Sítio d'Abadia	3,251

== Statistics ==
This is the poorest and most isolated region of the state of Goiás. According to the United Nations Human Development Index (2000) several of its municipalities were in the lowest places of the state ranking. Buritinópolis occupied last place in the state with a score of 0.600, and the other cities fared little better—Guarani de Goiás with 0.632, Flores de Goiás with 0.642, Divinópolis with 0.675, Iaciara with 0.704, Mambaí with 0.64, Posse with 0.711, São Domingos with 0.631, Simolândia with 0.657, Sítio d'Abadia with 0.643, and Alvorada do Norte with 0.688. This index measures life expectancy, literacy rate of adults, school attendance, and per capita income.

The largest municipality in population is Posse with 28,850 and in area it is Flores de Goiás with 3,722.8 km². The smallest in population is Sítio d'Abadia with 3,251 and in area it is Buritinópolis with 269,1 km².

- Municipality with most cattle: Flores de Goiás with 147,400
- Municipality with greatest soybean production: Flores de Goiás with 5,400 tons
- Municipality with greatest corn production: Flores de Goiás with 14,000 tons
- Municipality with highest GDP: Posse with 128,500,000 Reais (2005)
- Municipality with lowest GDP: Buritinópolis with 9,000,000 Reais (2005)
- Municipality with highest per capita GDP: Sítio d'Abadia with 6,304 Reais
- Municipality with lowest per capita GDP: Buritinópolis with 2,546 Reais
- Municipality with highest literacy rate (2000): Alvorada do Norte with 80.5
- Municipality with lowest literacy rate (2000): Buritinópolis with 71.9
- Municipality with highest infant mortality rate: Buritinópolis and Flores de Goiás, both with 50.6
- Municipality with lowest infant mortality rate: Iaciara with 20.46
- Municipality with highest rural population: Flores de Goiás with 7,507
- Municipality with highest population growth rate 1996/2007: Flores de Goiás with 6.21%
- Municipality with lowest population growth rate 1996/2007: Guarani de Goiás with -1.28%

All data are from Sepin Estatísticas Municipais

== See also ==
- List of municipalities in Goiás
- Microregions of Goiás
