= Posse, Goiás =

Posse
- Municipality
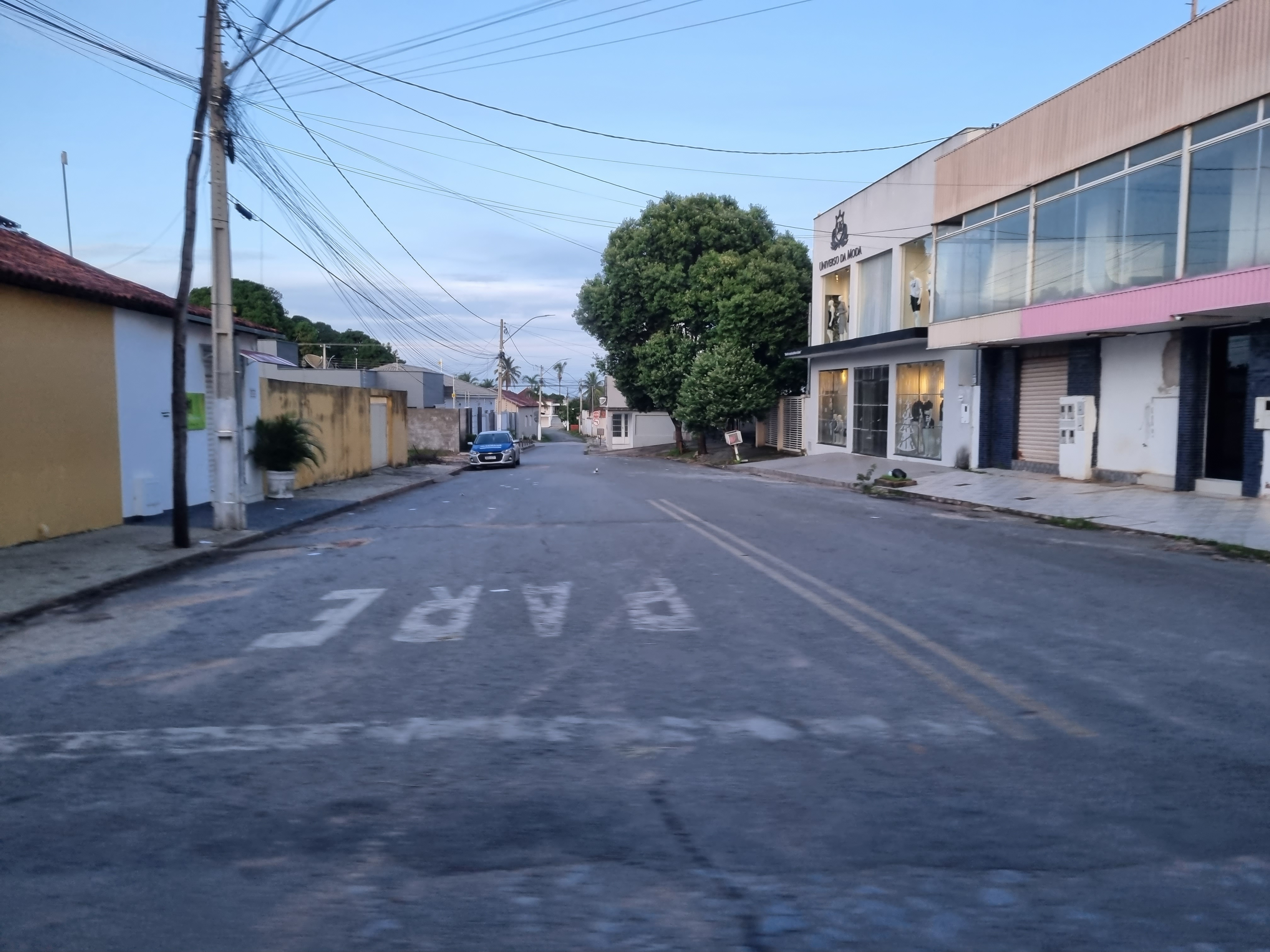

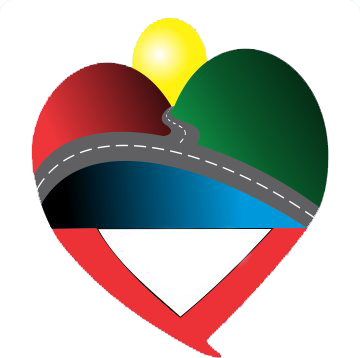
- Flag Coat of arms

- Location in Goiás state

- Location in Brazil
- Coordinates: 14°05′19″S 46°21′18″W
- Country: Brazil
- Region: Central-West
- State: Goiás
- Microregion: Vão do Paranã

Area
  - Total: 1,949.6 km^{2} (752.7 sq mi)

Population (2020)
  - Total: 37,414
  - Density: 19.191/km^{2} (49.703/sq mi)
- Time zone: UTC−3 (BRT)
- Postal code: 73900-000

Posse is a municipality in northeastern Goiás state, Brazil. It is located northeast of Brasília, 24 km from the state boundary with Bahia, on interstate highway BR-020 (Brasília-Salvador).

== History ==
The town of Posse arose with the arrival of Northeastern migrants fleeing the drought in search of fertile lands in the mid-19th century. Among the pioneers there were many descendants of Argentinians and Portuguese and many of the streams and rivers had names remembering those far away lands—Rio Corrente, Rio Prata, and Porto Buenos Aires. The settlement was first called Buenos Aires, located below the joining of the Rio Corrente with the Rio Paranã. The town did not progress because it was hit by malaria and the first settlers went to the higher lands at the foot of Serra Geral, where they formed another settlement.

Nazário da Silva Ribeiro, the founder had a chapel built in honor of Nossa Senora Santana. The new town received the name "Posse" (possession) because the inhabitants had seized the land along the Passagem do Gerais stream, in 1830. The town became a district in the municipality of São Domingos. In 1872 it got its autonomy and the name was changed from Nossa Senora Santa de Posse to just "Posse". In 1970 the BR-70 (Brasília-Salvador) was built and Posse began to grow.

== Geography ==
Posse has a privileged location at the foot of the Serra das Araras, with an average temperature of 25 °C and a supply of mineral water taken from the slopes of the mountains. The eastern part of the municipality is crossed by the Rio Paranã and its tributaries. This corresponds to the so-called gap (vão), an area that stretches from the high valley of the river to the plateaus that surround it. Its lands are fertile, with natural pasture and forests rich in hardwoods. The lands have a natural fertilizer—phosphate—which helps to renew the soil.

There are many waterfalls in the region, the most important being those of Rio Água Quente, on Fazenda Quebradas; Rio Prata, on Fazenda Campo Bonito; Rio Piracanjuba, on Fazenda Santo Antônio; and Rio Buriti, on the ranch of the same name.

=== Boundaries ===
Municipal boundaries are with Alvorada do Norte, Buritinópolis, Iaciara, Guarani de Goiás, Mambaí, Simolândia and the state of Bahia. The capital, Goiânia, lies at a distance of 515 km and connections are made by taking BR-153 / Anápolis / BR-060 / Abadiânia / Alexânia / Sobradinho / Planaltina / (DF) / Formosa / BR-020 / BR-030 / Bezerra / BR-020 / Vila Boa / Alvorada do Norte / GO-108.

== Economy ==
The main economic activity of the town is commerce. The preponderance of commerce is due to the strategic location of being on the border between Goiás and Bahia. Besides the inhabitants of the town, the population of the west of Bahia also shops in Posse. The town serves a population of 50,000 people. With the distance to the state capital being so great Posse has always had stronger ties with the state of Bahia and the Federal District. Agriculture stimulates the commerce of the town, with farmers coming from the vast agricultural region of the west of Bahia. Machines, seeds, fertilizers, and other products are acquired in Posse. Although they have farms in Bahia, most of the large farmers, who are mainly from the south of the country, live in Posse.

After commerce, cattle raising is the second most important economic activity of the region. There were 109,500 head of cattle in 2006. Other animals raised were poultry and swine. The main agricultural products were rice, bananas, sugarcane, beans, manioc, and corn. Corn was the largest in planted area with 2,000 hectares in 2006.

- Motor vehicles: 3,167 (automobiles and pickup trucks)
- Number of inhabitants per motor vehicle: 9

Agricultural data 2006

- Farms: 946
- Total area: 78,950 ha.
- Area of permanent crops: 2,143 ha.
- Area of perennial crops: 9,634 ha.
- Area of natural pasture: 39,387 ha.
- Area of woodland and forests: 21,875 ha.
- Persons dependent on farming: 2,500
- Cattle herd: 109,500
- Main crop: corn with 2,300 hectares planted and a production of 4,600 tons

== Health and education ==
In 2006 there was 1 hospital, with 62 beds. There were 44 schools with 9,869 students. In 2000 the infant mortality rate was 24.55, below the national average of 33.0. There was a campus of the State University of Goiás—UEG - Faculdade de Educação, Ciências e Letras de Posse, with 986 students in 2003. In 2000 the adult literacy rate was 79%, below the national average of 86.4%. On the Human Development Index Posse was ranked in the bottom tier with a rating of 0.711.

- State ranking: 194 (out of 242)
- National ranking: 2800 (out of 5507)

== Climate ==
Climate data for Posse (1991–2020)
Month	Jan	Feb	Mar	Apr	May	Jun	Jul	Aug	Sep	Oct	Nov	Dec	Year
Mean daily maximum °C (°F)	29.7 (85.5)	29.7 (85.5)	29.7 (85.5)	30.0 (86.0)	29.7 (85.5)	29.0 (84.2)	29.0 (84.2)	30.6 (87.1)	32.5 (90.5)	32.4 (90.3)	29.9 (85.8)	29.6 (85.3)	30.2 (86.4)
Daily mean °C (°F)	24.3 (75.7)	24.3 (75.7)	24.3 (75.7)	24.5 (76.1)	23.9 (75.0)	22.9 (73.2)	22.7 (72.9)	24.2 (75.6)	26.2 (79.2)	26.4 (79.5)	24.5 (76.1)	24.4 (75.9)	24.4 (75.9)
Mean daily minimum °C (°F)	20.4 (68.7)	20.4 (68.7)	20.5 (68.9)	20.5 (68.9)	19.5 (67.1)	18.3 (64.9)	17.8 (64.0)	18.9 (66.0)	20.9 (69.6)	21.6 (70.9)	20.6 (69.1)	20.5 (68.9)	20.0 (68.0)
Average precipitation mm (inches)	199.7 (7.86)	192.1 (7.56)	226.7 (8.93)	121.2 (4.77)	28.4 (1.12)	1.8 (0.07)	0.3 (0.01)	4.6 (0.18)	13.2 (0.52)	99.7 (3.93)	220.8 (8.69)	237.0 (9.33)	1,345.5 (52.97)
Average precipitation days (≥ 1.0 mm)	15	14	15	9	3	0	0	0	2	8	15	16	97
Average relative humidity (%)	73.6	74.4	75	69.5	61.4	55.2	50.2	44.9	44.4	54.9	71.2	73.6	62.4
Mean monthly sunshine hours	175.1	169.2	181.6	214.3	249.3	253.3	272.8	283.7	233.4	200.0	151.0	145.3	2,529
Source: Instituto Nacional de Meteorologia (sun 1981–2010)

== See also ==
- List of municipalities in Goiás
- Microregions in Goiás
