= São Domingos, Goiás =

São Domingos
- Municipality
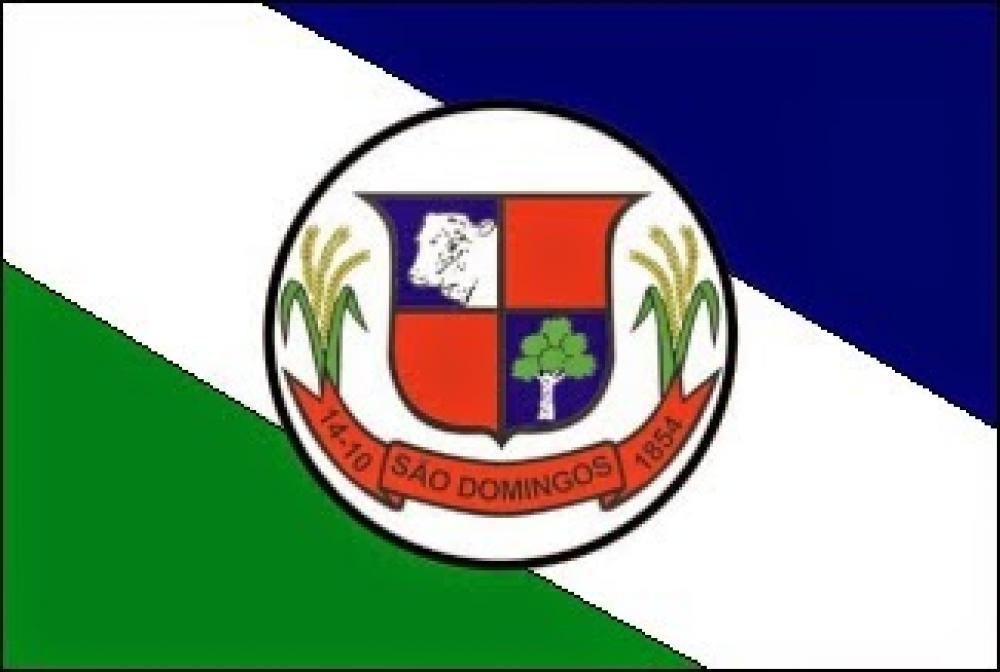
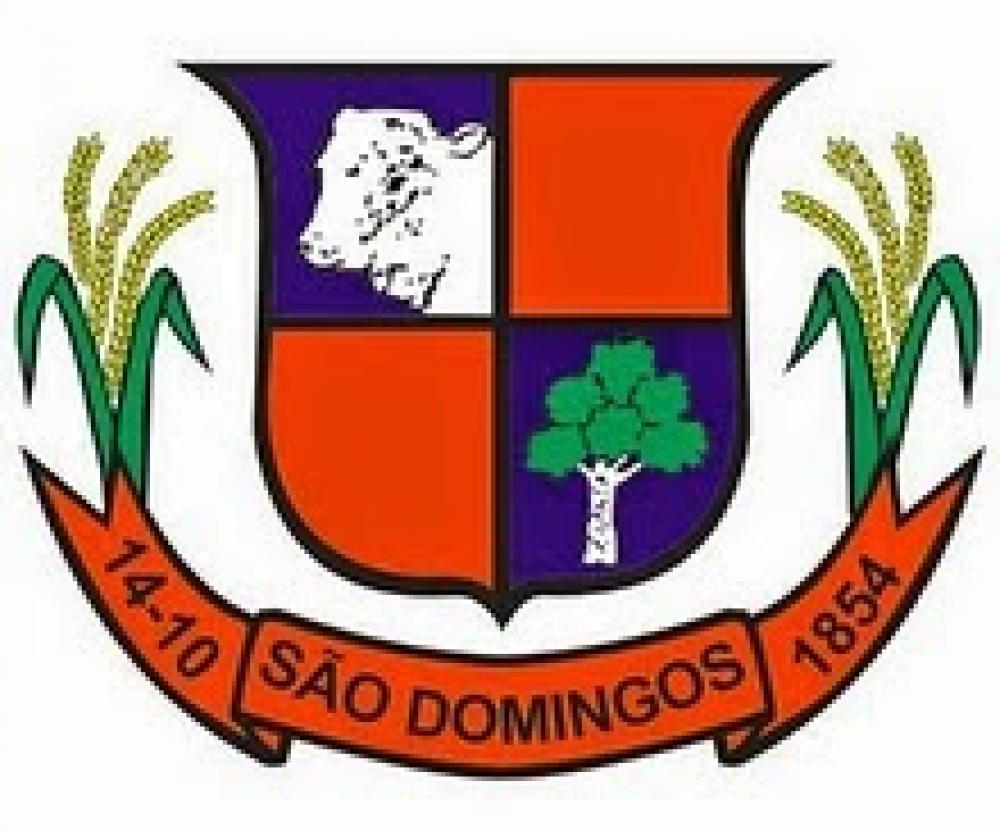
- Flag Coat of arms

- Location in Goiás state

- Location in Brazil
- Coordinates: 13°24′27″S 46°18′51″W
- Country: Brazil
- Region: Central-West
- State: Goiás
- Microregion: Vão do Paranã

Area
  - Total: 3,295.5 km^{2} (1,272.4 sq mi)
- Elevation: 677 m (2,221 ft)

Population (2020)
  - Total: 13,103
  - Density: 3.9760/km^{2} (10.298/sq mi)
- Time zone: UTC−3 (BRT)
- Postal code: 73860-000

São Domingos is a municipality in northeastern Goiás state, Brazil. It is a large producer of beef cattle but is one of the poorest towns in the state.

== Location ==
São Domingos is located in the Vão do Paranã statistical micro-region and is 400 km. from Brasília and 641 km. from the state capital, Goiânia. It is the furthest municipality in the state from Goiânia

Highway connections are made by BR-153 / Anápolis / BR-060 / Alexânia / Planaltina / GO-118 / BR-010 / São João d'Aliança / Alto Paraíso de Goiás / BR-010 / GO-118 / Teresina de Goiás / Monte Alegre de Goiás / GO-447 / Vazante / Divinópolis de Goiás / GO-463. (64 km. unpaved road)

Neighboring municipalities are Divinópolis de Goiás (north); Guarani de Goiás (south); Iaciara (west); the state of Bahia (east).

The area is very rich in wood, especially cedar, aroeira, ipê, peroba, braúna, vinhático and umburana. Vegetation is typically savanna (cerrado) with pequi and buriti trees. The climate is humid tropical with an average annual temperature of 26 °C.

== History ==
The settlement of this town began at the end of the eighteenth century on the banks of the present-day São Domingos River. The first settlement was called "Arraial Velho" but it soon fell into ruin. In 1821 the Portuguese Domingos and José Valente arrived seeking gold. They brought an image of São Domingos Gusmão, which gave the name to the town and the river that passes nearby. The town grew and in 1835 it became a district of Arraias, which is now part of Tocantins In 1854 it became a municipality, one of the oldest in the state of Goiás.

== Demographics ==
- Population density: 2.97 inhabitants/km^{2} (2007)
- Population in 1980: 9,660
- Population in 2010: 10,996
- Urban population: 5,134
- Rural population: 4,652
- Population growth rate: 0.29% 1996/2007

== Economy ==
The economy is based on subsistence agriculture, cattle raising (120,000 head in 2004), services, public administration, and small transformation industries. There was one bank: Banco do Brasil S.A. (Agosto/2007).

- Motor vehicles: 271 (automobiles and pickup trucks)
- Inhabitants per motor vehicle: 34

Agricultural data 2006

- Farms: 763
- Total area: 127,855 ha.
- Area of permanent crops: 133 ha.
- Area of perennial crops: 33,301 ha.
- Area of natural pasture: 52,931 ha.
- Area of woodland and forests: 29,307 ha.
- Persons dependent on farming: 2,300
- Number of tractors: 83
- Cattle herd: 144,700
- Main crop: corn with 4,500 planted hectares

== Health and education ==
- Adult literacy rate: 74.0% (2000) (national average was 86.4%)
- Infant mortality rate: 41.97 (2000) (national average was 33)
- Hospitals: 1 with 16 beds (2007)
- Schools: 17 with 3,291 students (2006)

Human Development Index 2000: 0.631

- State ranking: 239 (out of 242)
- National ranking: 4,108 (out of 5,507)

== Tourism ==
The topography of the region is very mountainous, with the municipal seat lying near the Serra Geral mountains. The site was chosen for the filming of a TV miniseries called Grande Sertão Veredas. Nearby is a state park called Parque Estadual da Terra Ronca, which contains Angelica cavern, whose 14 km. extension makes it one of the longest in the country. The park gets its name from a cavern, Terra Ronca, which produces a sound caused by an underground river.

== See also ==
- List of municipalities in Goiás
- Microregions in Goiás
