= Guarani de Goiás =

- Municipality
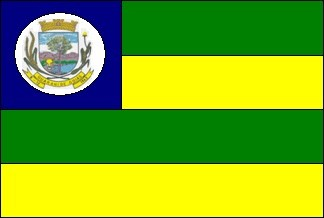
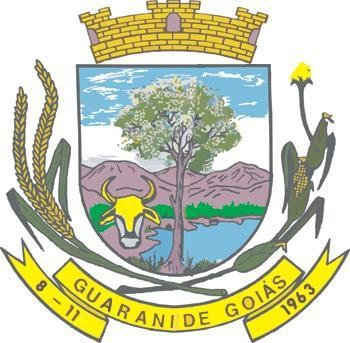
- Flag Coat of arms

- Location in Goiás state

- Location in Brazil
- Coordinates: 13°56′23″S 46°28′38″W
- Country: Brazil
- Region: Central-West
- State: Goiás
- Microregion: Vão do Paranã

Area
  - Total: 1,229.1 km^{2} (474.6 sq mi)
- Elevation: 521 m (1,709 ft)

Population (2020)
  - Total: 3,846
  - Density: 3.129/km^{2} (8.104/sq mi)
- Time zone: UTC−3 (BRT)
- Postal code: 73910-000

Guarani de Goiás is a municipality of Brazil, located in northeastern Goiás.

== Geography ==
Guarani belongs to the Vão do Paranã statistical microregion. It borders the municipals of São Domingos, Iaciara, Posse, as well as the state of Bahia.

Guarani is located south of the Terra Ronca state park and 28 kilometers north of Posse. Guarani is crossed by the Frei River, which has one of the most beautiful waterfalls in the region.

The distance to Goiânia is 550 km. Connections are made by taking BR-153 / Anápolis / GO-060 / Alexânia / Planaltina / Formosa / GO-020 / BR-030 / Vila Boa / Alvorada do Norte / GO-108 / Posse.

== Demographics ==
- Population density: 3.34 inhabitants/km^{2}
- Population in 1980: 3,978
- Population in 2007: 4,105
- Urban population: 1,743
- Rural population: 2,362
- Population growth rate: -1.28%

== Economy ==
The main economic activities are cattle raising, poultry raising, and agriculture (beans, manioc corn, and bananas). There were no hospitals in 2007.

- Industrial units: 1
- Retail commercial units: 30
- Motor vehicles (automobiles and pickup trucks): 146
- Number of inhabitants per motor vehicle: 28

Agricultural data 2006

- Farms: 550
- Total area: 165,143 ha.
- Area of permanent crops: 149 ha.
- Area of perennial crops: 1,713 ha.
- Area of pasture: 106,927 ha.
- Area of woodland and forests: 53,907 ha.
- Persons dependent on farming: 1,750
- Cattle herd: 55,200
- Corn: 450 ha.
- Sugarcane: 80 ha.
- Rice: 450 ha.
- Beans: 60 ha.
- Manioc: 60 ha.

== Health and education ==
Ranking on the Municipal Human Development Index: 0.632

- State ranking: 238 (out of 242 in 2000)
- National ranking: 4,091 (out of 5,507 in 2000)
- Literacy rate: 72.2% (2000)
- Infant mortality rate: 37.81 in 1,000 live births (2000)
- Schools: 12 with 1,429 students
- Hospitals: none in 2007

== History ==
The town was first created as a district of the municipality of São Domingos with the name of Guarani in 1919. In 1943 the name was changed to Coatiçaba. In 1963 it was dismembered from São Domingos and formed a new municipality with the name Guarani de Goiás.

== See also ==
- List of municipalities in Goiás
- Microregions in Goiás
- Vão do Paranã Microregion
