= Mambaí =

- Municipality
- The Municipality of Mambaí
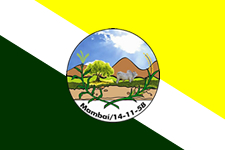
- Flag

- Location of Mambaí in Goiás
- Coordinates: 14°29′46″S 46°06′22″W
- Country: Brazil
- Region: Central-West
- State: Goiás
- Founded: November 14, 1958

Government
  - Mayor: Glenice Alves Teixeira (PL)

Area
  - Total: 859.555 km^{2} (331.876 sq mi)

Population (2020)
  - Total: 9,081
  - Density: 6.4/km^{2} (17/sq mi)
- Time zone: UTC−3 (BRT)
- HDI (2000): 0.647 – medium

Mambaí is a city in eastern Goiás state, Brazil. It is the easternmost city in that state.

== History ==
The settlement began in the 19th century when settlers from the state of Bahia came looking for rubber produced by the mangabeira tree. The village that appeared took the name Riachão. After the building of a chapel and the passing of muleteers heading to Bahia the settlement began to grow. Soon the name was changed to Mambaí and it became a district of the municipality of Posse. The origin of the name is unknown. In 1958 it was dismembered from Posse and became an autonomous municipality.

== Geography ==
Mambaí is one of the most isolated cities in the state of Goiás. It lies in the Vão do Paranã statistical micro-region less than 20 kilometers from the border with the state of Bahia. It is 61 kilometers to the main interstate highway, the BR-020, which links Brasília to Salvador. It is 250 kilometers to Brasília. The distance to the state capital of Goiânia is 512 kilometers. Municipal boundaries are with Posse, Buritinópolis, Damianópolis, and the state of Bahia. Highway connections from Goiânia are made by taking BR-153 / Anápolis / Alexânia / BR-060 / Planaltina / Formosa / BR-020 / Simolândia / GO-236.

=== Demographics ===
The population decreased 8.37.% from 1991 to 1996 and continued the decline from 1996 to 2000 with -4.02.%. In 1980 the population was 5,125 so in twenty-five years the increase has been negligible.

== Economy ==
The economy was mainly based on agriculture, with extensive cattle raising occupying most of the territory. Most inhabitants were employed in small retail units, government jobs, and modest industrial transformation units. There were no banking institutions reporting in August 2007.

The cattle herd was small compared to other municipalities in the state. In 2006 there were 7,900 head. The number of milk cows—480—was one of the smallest in the state. The main agricultural products in planted area were corn, sugarcane, beans, manioc, and rice.

- Motor vehicles: 328 (automobiles and pickup trucks)
- Number of inhabitants per motor vehicle: 20

=== Agricultural data 2006 ===
- Farms: 392
- Total area: 27,399 ha.
- Area of permanent crops: 62 ha.
- Area of perennial crops: 1,047 ha.
- Area of natural pasture: 15,174 ha.
- Area of woodland and forests: 97,327 ha.
- Persons dependent on farming: 1,200
- Cattle herd: 7,900
- Main crop: rice and corn with 320 hectares each

== Health and education ==
In 2006 there were 6 schools and 01 hospital with 18 beds.

- The infant mortality rate was 34.8 in 1,000 live births in 2000.
- The adult literacy rate was 75% in 2000, the lowest in the state.

In 2000 Mambaí was ranked 234 out of 242 municipalities in the state of Goiás on the United Nations Human Development Index with a score of 0.647. Nationally it was ranked 3,816 out of 5,507 municipalities.

== Tourism ==
=== Places to visit ===
1.Cachoeira do Funil

Hiking Trails

Beneath the falls, people can walk through the cave (a good headlight is suggested). Above the waterfall, there are various places to take baths and get water massages. Visitors can also rappel from the top of the waterfall and swing under the water.

2.Caverna Lapa do Penhasco

Caverns & Caves

It can be risky for extremely young children with a running river, water crossing, and many stones. Light clothing and sneakers for the moderate to strenuous trail is advised.

3.Cachoeira do Alemão

Waterfalls

To reach the waterfall, there is a steep slope that might pose a challenge to some.

4.Trilha Itaguassu

Hiking Trails

Mamba's natural features are visible by walking this trail. The path travels uphill and downhill and passes beneath large trees, with places to rest and swim in clear water. The cave and surrounding area contains rock formations and is cut by a river. A map is advised due to the size of the trail and occasionally rocky terrain.

5.Caverna Claraboia

Caverns & Caves

Visitors can rappel down to enter the cave through a hole in the ceiling.

== Gypsy Community ==
There is a small gypsy community living in the area, which was the study of a linguist, Fábio José Dantas Melo, from the University of Brasília. Professor Melo carried out a study on the dialect spoken by these Gypsies.

== See also ==
- List of municipalities in Goiás
