= Vila Boa, Goiás =

Vila Boa
- Municipality
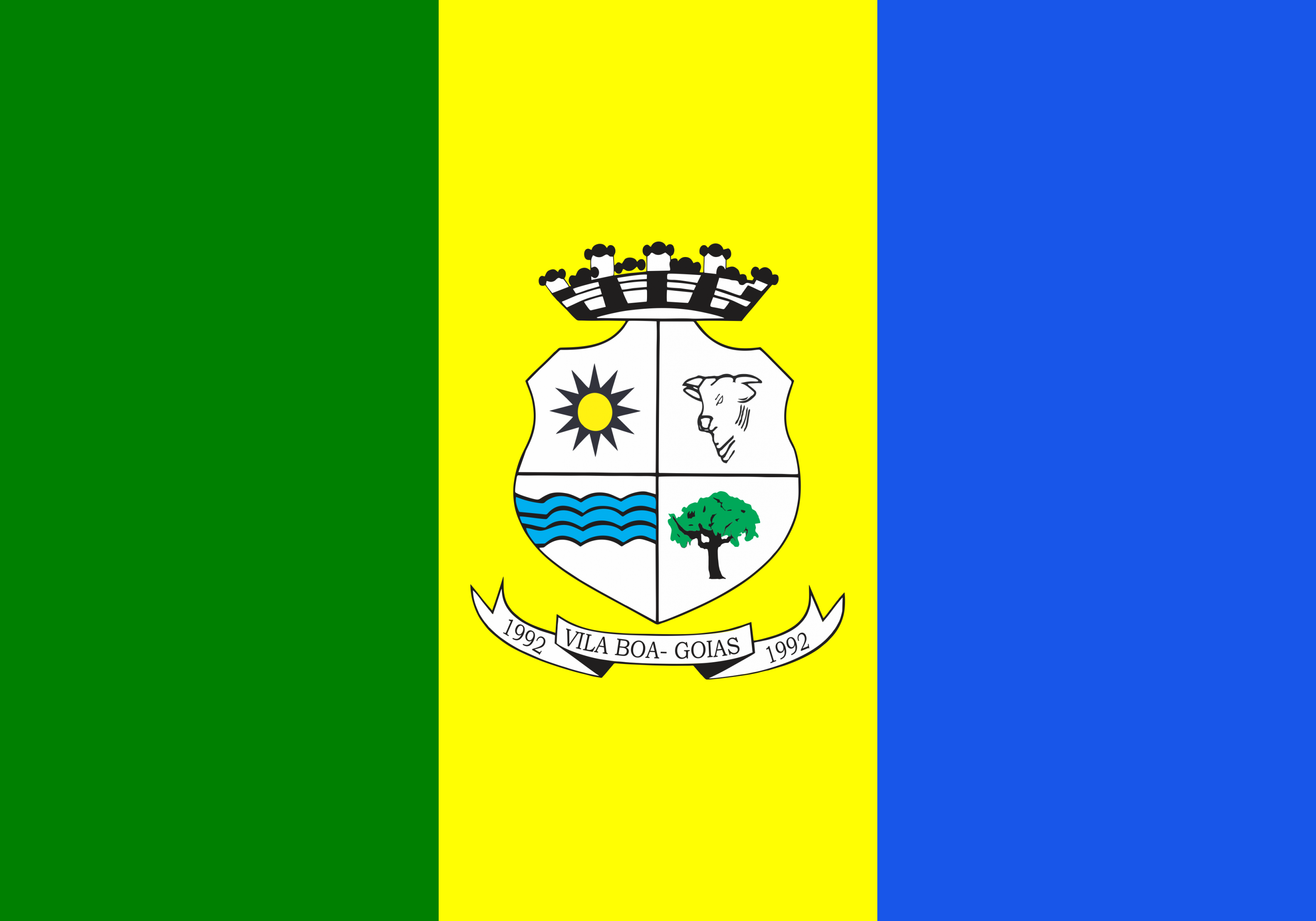
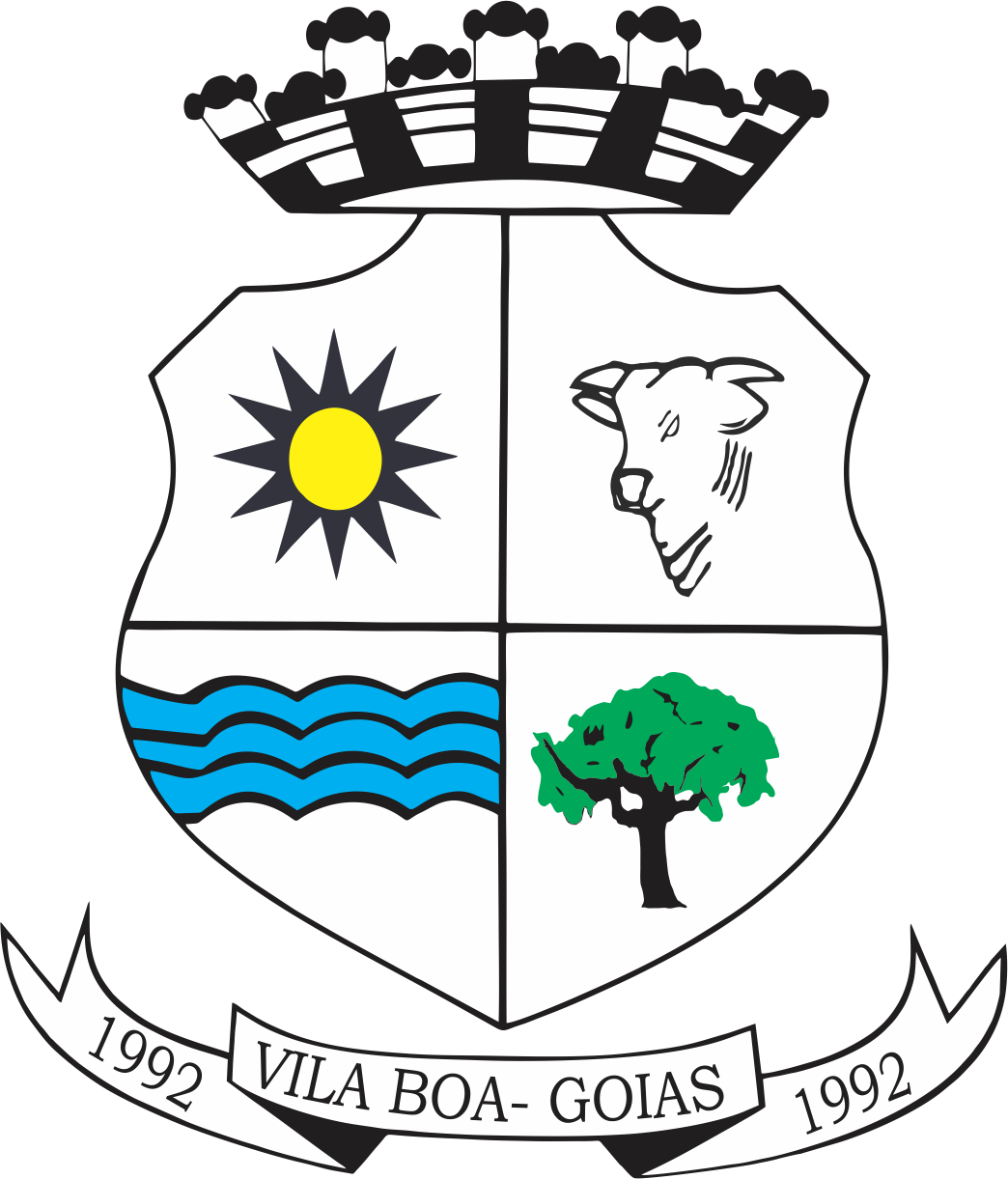
- Flag Coat of arms

- Location in Goiás state

- Location in Brazil
- Coordinates: 15°02′01″S 47°02′52″W
- Country: Brazil
- Region: Central-West
- State: Goiás
- Mesoregion: Leste Goiano
- Microregion: Entorno do Distrito Federal

Government
  - Mayor: Felipe Alves Santana (PRTB)

Area
  - Total: 1,060.0 km^{2} (409.3 sq mi)
- Elevation: 640 m (2,100 ft)

Population (2020)
  - Total: 6,312
  - Density: 5.955/km^{2} (15.42/sq mi)
- Time zone: UTC−3 (BRT)
- Postal code: 73825-000

Vila Boa is a municipality in northeastern Goiás state, Brazil.

== Location ==
Vila Boa is located on the extreme northeast limit of the Entorno do Distrito Federal microregion. The nearest major population center is Formosa, which is 95 km. to the southeast. It forms boundaries with:

- west and south: Formosa
- east and north: Flores de Goiás

The distance to state capital, Goiânia, is 365 km. Highway connections from Goiânia are made by BR-153 / Anápolis / GO-060 / Alexânia / Sobradinho / BR-020 / BR-030 / Formosa / BR-020 / Distrito Bezerra (district of Formosa). For the complete list of distances see Distâncias Rodoviárias

== History ==
Vila Boa was once a district (1988) of Formosa, and for years was just a small village with a gas station and a few houses on the main road to Salvador. It is 95 kilometres northeast of Formosa. It has grown rapidly with the arrival of farmers from the south of the country in search of inexpensive land to plant soybeans and raise cattle. In 1992 it was dismembered from Formosa and raised to municipal status.

== The economy ==
The economy is based on agriculture (rice, coffee, sugarcane, and corn), cattle raising (34,000 head in 2006), services, public administration, and small transformation industries.

Agricultural data 2006

- Farms: 217
- Total area: 94,002 ha.
- Area of permanent crops: 343 ha.
- Area of perennial crops: 3,497 ha.
- Area of natural pasture: 50,586 ha.
- Area of woodland and forests: 34,131 ha.
- Persons dependent on farming: 850
- Number of tractors: 85 IBGE

== Health and education ==
- Higher education: none
- Adult literacy rate: 77.2% (2000) (national average was 86.4%)
- Hospitals: 1 with 13 beds (2007)
- Infant mortality rate: 28.9 (2000) (national average was 33.0).
- Human Development Index: 0.674
- State ranking: 226 (out of 242 municipalities in 2000)
- National ranking: 3,389 (out of 5,507 municipalities in 2000)

== See also ==
- List of municipalities in Goiás
- Microregions of Goiás
