= Formosa, Goiás =

Formosa, Goiás Municipality of Formosa
- Flag Coat of arms

- Location in the state of Goiás and Brazil

- Location in Brazil
- Coordinates: 15°32′13″S 47°20′02″W
- Country: Brazil
- Region: Central-West
- State: Goiás
- Demonym: formosense
- Founded: August 1, 1843

Government
  - Mayor: Ernesto Roller (MDB)

Area
  - Total: 5,813.637 km^{2} (2,244.658 sq mi)
- Elevation: 916 m (3,005 ft)

Population (2022 Census)
  - Total: 115,669
  - Estimate (2025): 121,559
  - Density: 19.8962/km^{2} (51.5308/sq mi)
- Time zone: UTC−3 (BRT)
- Website: www.formosa.go.gov.br

Formosa is a municipality located in the state of Goiás, Brazil, approximately 80 kilometers northeast of Brasília. The population was 115,669 (2022 Census) in a total area of 5,813.637 km^{2}. Formosa is known for its waterfalls and natural environment. It is a large producer of cattle and grains and is one of the fastest-growing cities in the state.

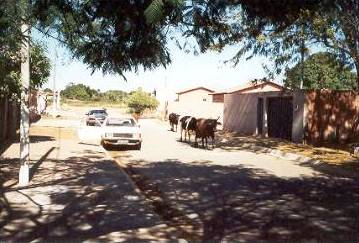
A bucolic street scene in Formosa.

== History ==
Arraial dos Couros was the first name of Formosa, which was founded in the second half of the eighteenth century on an uncertain date. For lack of documentation the early history is fragmented and historians can only speculate about the real facts.

What is known is that problems connected to the area of health were the motive for the transfer of the old settlement which was founded and built by black slaves, located on the banks of the Itiquira River and the Paranã in the tropical Paranã valley. At the time a devastating fever swept the place, probably caused by the unhealthy climate of the river location, and the population was afflicted by a degenerative malaria. For fear of getting the disease the move was made very quickly.

Even today it is not known who was responsible for the move or the date in which it occurred. The historians register the existence of a new settlement called Couros. It is believed that the name Arraial dos Couros comes from the improvised houses which were covered with the leather of the loads of the tradesmen. The first huts were set up in the old Street of the Crioulos which has been transformed into the present-day Alves de Castro Street. Another theory is that the name could have come from the existence in the site of an artisan who made saddlebags and rawhides for transporting small loads such as hard molasses, salt, rice and other food items.

On August 1, 1843, the settlement was elevated to the category of Vila (town), and received the name of Vila Formosa da Imperatriz, chosen for the beauty of the area and to pay homage to the Empress Teresa Cristina.

The municipality of Formosa was only created on February 22, 1844.

Other important dates are:

- 1910 - founding of Colégio São José, the Catholic school
- 1913 - the weather station was established
- 1920 - arrival of the first automobile in Formosa
- 1926 - arrival of the first airplane
- 1928 - inauguration of the telegraph
- 1932 - the first electric light
- 1943 - the first Agro-Pecuária (Agro-Cattle) Fair
- 1960 - the first public telephone

== Geography ==
Formosa belongs to the micro-region called Entorno do Distrito Federal, which is composed of 20 municipalities with 960,000 inhabitants in a total area of 38,212.00 km². It has municipal boundaries with:

- North: São João d'Aliança
- South: Cabeceira Grande, Minas Gerais
- East: Buritis, Minas Gerais
- West: Federal District

The average elevation of this large area is around 1000 meters, about the same as Brasília, eighty kilometers away. The terrain is for the most part characterized by gently undulating flat plateau lands, especially to the north and south. There is a deep valley formed by the Paranã river which begins just on the northeastern limits of the urban area. This valley has a more tropical vegetation and once had dense forests, now cleared for the most part for cattle raising. The flatlands surrounding Formosa are characterized by cerrado vegetation, consisting of grasslands, interspersed by low, thorn-covered trees, many of which are protected against the annual fires by thick bark.

=== Land ===
Formosa is located in the second largest of Brazil's eco-regions, the Cerrado. The term "Cerrado" means "dense" or "closed" in both Portuguese and Spanish, an unusual term for a region that consists mainly of tree and scrub savannah. Local diversity in parts of the Cerrado is quite impressive. Just within the limits of Brasília, the 37-year-old capital of Brazil located at the heart of the Cerrado, there are some 81 mammals, 429 birds, 40 snakes and lizards, 11 amphibians, 1,000 butterflies, and 550 bees and wasps recorded to date.

Where rivers cut the flatlands there are still areas of dense vegetation, which once had stands of hard tropical wood such as aroeira, angico, peroba, jacaranda, jatobá and pau ferro. One of the most notable trees is the ipê roxo (tabebuia), or purple ipê. Most of this vegetation has been eliminated by the need to find hard woods for fenceposts and other uses. Even the typical cerrado vegetation has gradually disappeared and been replaced by expanses of soybeans or cattle pasture. See List of plants of cerrado vegetation.

The fauna has trickled to traces of what it once was, especially in those areas suitable for mechanized agriculture. Only in the Paranã valley, a land of few people and cattle ranches that have caused less damage than soy beans has there been some preservation of wildlife. Birds abound, with parakeets, araras, caracara hawks, wild doves, and toucans a not uncommon sight. The urubu (black vulture), nature's dustman, is ubiquitous. Mammals consist of the guará wolf, the armadillo, the ema (a small rhea), deer, two species of monkey: the prego (nail) monkey and the guariba or howler monkey, and the occasional onça pintada or jaguar. In addition, the Cerrado harbors 80 species of bats, which roughly correspond to 60% of the 138 Brazilian bat species, and more than 40% of the total South American bat fauna. Considering only the Cerrado, which has 109 species of non-flying mammals, bats represent 42% of the total mammalian fauna, being, by far, the richest group, followed by rodents (46 sp), carnivores (21) and marsupials (18).

The most common insect is probably the leaf cutting ant, but common sights are the termites with their innumerable termite hills covering the landscape, several species of spiders, wild bees, dung beetles, especially around the cattle ranches, enormous night moths, and the fireflies with their eerie nocturnal lights. One species of black spider lives in a compact group like a large ball during the daylight hours, their thick as fish line web stretching between large trees. At dusk the spiders scurry out from their cluster to take up positions on the long web and catch the nocturnal insects as they fly blindly to their fate.

One insect which is harmful to man is the barbeiro or barber bug (a species of assassin bug) which lives in the walls of poor, country hovels and feeds on the inhabitants at night. It is responsible for the Chagas disease, which has no cure and is usually fatal. New cases are rare because of a national campaign of elimination of the insect host.

Ticks are abundant, especially in high grass, as are screwworm flies (called berne in Portuguese) which cause havoc in cattle herds and can even lay their eggs on humans. The damage to the cow's hide can be disastrous unless controlled.

A common parasite on farms is the bicho do pe or foot worm (Tunga penetrans), which especially embeds itself between the toes. Luckily, at this elevation other tropical illnesses such as malaria and yellow fever are rare.

The upper Paranã valley though, with its lower elevation and higher temperatures is quite unhealthy and its inhabitants run the risk of a wide gamut of tropical diseases as well as the added attraction of venomous snake bites. Medical care in this region is nonexistent.

=== Rivers, lakes and waterfalls ===
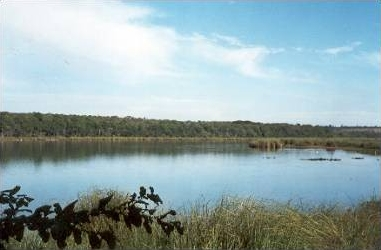
Lagoa Feia

Formosa lies at the source of three Brazilian river basins: the Amazon River represented by the Ribeirão Bandeirinha, the Río de la Plata represented by the Ribeirão Pipiripau and the São Francisco River represented by the Ribeirão Santa Rita, being called by the poet from Goiás, Leo Lince – "Cradle of the Waters of Brazil".

There are many rivers and waterfalls in the surrounding area. An attractive lake with a rather paradoxical name - Lagoa Feia - is located on the edge of the city. One of Brazil's highest waterfalls - Itiquira Falls is located about 30 km to the north. The main rivers of the Municipality are:

- The Paranã River – is the most important with a length of 500 km. It begins in a series of streams and in the eastern valley of the Serra Geral do Paranã, 4 km from the city. It flows through the interior of the municipality in a northern direction and receives more than 30 tributaries. It separates the municipalities of Formosa and São João d'Aliança. In the extreme north it receives the Paraim on the border with Flores de Goiás.
- The Preto River – it begins in Lagoa Feia, on the border with the Federal District and serves as a boundary between the DF and the state of Goiás. It receives several tributaries, the most important being the Ribeirão Bezerra.
- The Urucuia – its source is located to the east, 26 km from Formosa.

=== Climate ===
The climate is characterized as tropical altitude. The average temperature is about 25 °C. Temperatures vary little from month to month with perhaps a slight increase in the rainy season. The south of the municipality is higher and therefore temperatures are lower while the Paranã valley has hot and humid weather. What characterizes the climate of Formosa is less temperature than rainfall. The year may be divided into two seasons, the summer or rainy season lasting from October to April and the winter or dry season lasting from May to September.

Climate data for Formosa (1991–2020)
Month	Jan	Feb	Mar	Apr	May	Jun	Jul	Aug	Sep	Oct	Nov	Dec	Year
Mean daily maximum °C (°F)	28.3 (82.9)	28.6 (83.5)	28.4 (83.1)	28.3 (82.9)	27.7 (81.9)	27.0 (80.6)	27.1 (80.8)	28.9 (84.0)	30.8 (87.4)	30.8 (87.4)	28.3 (82.9)	28.1 (82.6)	28.5 (83.3)
Daily mean °C (°F)	23.2 (73.8)	23.3 (73.9)	23.1 (73.6)	22.9 (73.2)	21.7 (71.1)	20.7 (69.3)	20.6 (69.1)	22.2 (72.0)	24.3 (75.7)	24.7 (76.5)	23.2 (73.8)	23.2 (73.8)	22.8 (73.0)
Mean daily minimum °C (°F)	19.3 (66.7)	19.2 (66.6)	19.2 (66.6)	18.6 (65.5)	16.7 (62.1)	15.1 (59.2)	14.6 (58.3)	15.9 (60.6)	18.2 (64.8)	19.6 (67.3)	19.2 (66.6)	19.3 (66.7)	17.9 (64.2)
Average precipitation mm (inches)	222.9 (8.78)	197.3 (7.77)	211.0 (8.31)	92.8 (3.65)	19.5 (0.77)	3.9 (0.15)	0.2 (0.01)	7.6 (0.30)	27.7 (1.09)	101.8 (4.01)	207.8 (8.18)	246.9 (9.72)	1,339.4 (52.73)
Average precipitation days (≥ 1.0 mm)	15.3	12.9	14.3	7.7	2.3	0.4	0.0	1.0	2.9	8.1	15.0	16.1	96.0
Average relative humidity (%)	74.6	74.1	76.0	71.4	65.3	58.8	52.5	45.7	46.5	56.8	73.4	75.5	64.2
Average dew point °C (°F)	18.8 (65.8)	18.8 (65.8)	19.0 (66.2)	18.1 (64.6)	15.7 (60.3)	13.3 (55.9)	11.6 (52.9)	11.0 (51.8)	12.5 (54.5)	15.5 (59.9)	18.3 (64.9)	18.8 (65.8)	16.0 (60.8)
Mean monthly sunshine hours	175.1	177.2	186.3	216.8	253.9	265.8	285.1	294.8	251.3	208.5	152.3	154.0	2,621.1
Source: NOAA

== Economy ==
Economic activity in Formosa is based primarily on services and agriculture with soybeans, cattle raising, rice, manioc and corn being the main sources of income. The GDP in 2005 was R$428 million, of which 290 million was generated by services. There are several small industries producing furniture and bricks.

=== Cattle raising ===
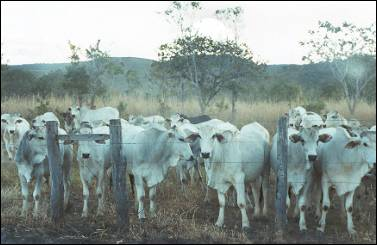
Zebu cattle on a farm near Formosa

Extensive cattle raising for meat is still the main economic activity of the municipality. The 2006 census showed that there were 237,000 cows, of which 25,800 were dairy cows. Most of this cattle is exported, especially to the nearby market of two million people in the Federal District. Sheep raising is an activity - 1,899 - and is mainly done by Gaucho immigrants from Rio Grande do Sul.

In recent years more enterprising farmers, especially those who have come from the south - the Gauchos - have utilized soil correction, replacement of traditional grasses by imported, drought resistant varieties (braquiara), and pasture rotation to increase productivity.

Other than poor grasses the biggest problem in this area has always been the long period of drought during the winter months of June, July, and August. In some years not one drop of rain falls. Pastures turn brown and reservoirs and streams dry up. Cattle begin to lose weight and mortality increases. Ranches must have a substantial stand of elephant grass and sugar cane to serve as the basis for feed which is supplemented by ground corn (the corn is picked and left to dry in storage) or rice bran (farelo). Many farms produce these crops only for cattle feed purposes. Silage is also becoming popular but traditional ranchers resist any change.

Dairy farming is in the incipient stage in Formosa and mechanical milking is still rare. The low price of milk paid to the producers, the high cost of technology, and the lack of trained personnel discourage improvement in this area.

=== Agriculture ===
Agriculture is characterized by the moderate production of soybeans and corn. The growing of soybeans was associated not only to modernization but to the obtaining of easy rural credit by producers who came from the south of the country - Rio Grande do Sul and Paraná - looking for abundant and cheap land. The arrival of these farmers caused a revolution in the development of the municipality. Soybeans, corn, rice, and beans began to be planted with advanced techniques - mechanization, soil correction, chemical fertilizers, and even pivot irrigation.

The local economy, which had been based entirely on cattle raising, went through a transformation which created more jobs and service enterprises. Huge grain storage facilities have appeared on the outskirts of town and there are now dozens of shops specializing in supporting the agricultural economy.

Other important agricultural products from the region are rice, sugar cane, beans, manioc, tomatoes, and pineapples. Fruit trees are planted in every back yard and on the fazendas, but production is mainly for local consumption. Common fruits are oranges, lemons, tangerines, papaya, mango and passion fruit.

=== Agricultural data (2006) ===
- Farms: 2,501
- Total area: 303,633
- Area in permanent crops: 5,798
- Area in perennial crops: 43,569 hectares
- Natural Pasture: 185,318 hectares
- Woodland and Forest: 78,638 hectares
- Persons connected to agriculture: 6,500
- Cattle herd: 237,000 head
- Tractors: 479
- Main crops: soybeans (7,500 hectares), corn (3,500 hectares), beans (1,300 hectares), and rice (800 hectares)

=== Industry, commerce, and services ===
The economic scene in Formosa is made up of small enterprises including cereal processing, brickworks, lumber mills, furniture factories, and bakeries. Almost all of them are family owned. Out of the 1463 economic entities listed in 2004, 997 had fewer than 4 workers. There were only 9 with more than 50 workers.

Commerce and services are probably the fastest growing segment of the local economy. With a population of 90,000 in the region there is a need for a variety of goods and services. As mentioned above, there are a large number of enterprises selling agricultural products or connected to agriculture such as tractor repair or machine repair shops. Construction materials firms are also important.

=== Health and education ===
In 2005 there were 37 health establishments. These consisted of 18 public clinics and 15 private clinics. There were 03 private hospitals and 01 public hospital. There were 113 hospital beds available to the public. In the educational sector there were 60 public and 10 private primary schools. There were 12 public and 7 private middle schools. There were 50 pre-schools—40 public and 10 private. In higher education there were 02 schools, one public and 01 private. Total enrollment in 2005 was 3,300 students.

=== Quality of life ===
Since housing is cheaper in Formosa than in nearby Brasília many people live there and commute, usually by bus, to the capital. This influx of new dwellers has caused the population of Formosa to grow rapidly in recent years. This fact, in addition to the lack of public investment, has overburdened services such as health and education. As of 2006 the city had no sewage system or sewage treatment plant, although extensive construction began in 2005 to remedy this problem. Almost all of the houses use septic tanks, endangering the groundwater which is vital to this region where so many important rivers have their source. Most public schools give poorly taught lessons to students, mainly because the government funds are not enough to assist the education professionals, keep adequate spaces or teaching tools and materials. Private schools provide little better, mainly just paying the yearly fees is enough for the students to receive a high school diploma. Public security is minimal, waiting times for police to arrive when called is up to an hour. When large public shows appear in the outskirts of the city, the infrastructure is quickly overwhelmed and violence soon starts. Lack of oversight of local police also contributes to public safety problems.

Human Development Index 2000

- MHDI: 0.750
- State ranking: 75 (out of 242 municipalities)
- National ranking: 1,867 (out of 5,507 municipalities).

== Tourist sites ==
The most important tourist attraction in Formosa is Itiquira Falls, but the surrounding area is rich in caves, waterfalls, and rushing rivers. In recent times groups of criminals have taken to robbing people walking the pathways to Itiquira and so caution is recommended when visiting this site is small groups. All information about tourist sites is from the Prefeitura de Formosa

=== Lagoa Feia ===
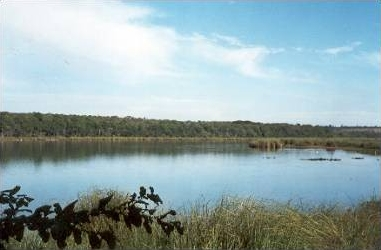
Lagoa Feia

Lagoa Feia means "ugly lake" in Portuguese. Located four kilometers from the center of the town, the Preto River, which flows south into the São Francisco, begins here. The south bank is part of an army base which is used for field training.

=== O Buraco das Araras ===
This cave, called Hole of the Macaws, is 41 kilometers from Formosa, following BR-20 north as far as the village of Bezerra. The cave is located in the middle of a flat landscape with scarce vegetation. One may see high trees and a river which forms a lake at the entrance of a cavern. This crater is 126 meters deep. The cave itself is one of the largest dolinas (caves formed by the caving in of the ceiling) in the world and was discovered in 1912.

Inside the immense hole there are tropical vegetation, ancient trees, volcanic rocks, and several species of animals like monkeys, wild cats and assorted birds. The parrots, who lent their name to the place, no longer live here, mainly due to destruction of the population for the illegal pet trade by local inhabitants . There are no tourist conveniences, and descent into the crater is considered dangerous.

=== Buraco das Andorinhas ===
There is another crater called Buraco das Andorinhas (Hole of the Swallows) which is located in the same area. It too has a subterranean lake and was formed by the caving in of the ceiling of a cavern. Access is very difficult and recommended for the young and adventurous. To reach the mouth of the cavern one must use ropes because the wall has no steps, and is covered with loose rock, wet clay, and moss. Once down, one will arrive at the entrance of one of the caverns which is surrounded by ferns. From this point on it is completely dark, so the use of helmets and lights is required.

=== Lajeado ===
It is a rock formation that cover over 500 meters of the riverbed which makes its descent forming falls that end in a pool of crystal water, two meters deep. The site has no tourist facilities.

=== The Upper Itiquira and Indaiá ===
Located in the micro-basin of the Itiquira River, the Indaiá Falls take their name from the company that bottles mineral water in the site. The walk down to the river and the falls is slightly difficult since it follows a very steep series of steps, which can be treacherous in the rainy season. The landscape has one thousand waterfalls, the smallest having 50 meters height. There are many pools for swimming in the polluted water. The river passes through a canyon and is surrounded by dense vegetation. Another poorly marked path will take the hardy walker to the top of the Itiquira Falls. In the area there is a camping site with adequate bathrooms. Recently it has become a hangout for armed robbers who wait for people either walking to or from the waterfalls and then rob people of all their possessions knowing that there isn't a big chance of the police interfering. No caution is recommended before venturing into the falls in large groups or into areas where there are a lot of people.

== Notable people ==
- Joesley Batista — Businessman

== See also ==
- List of municipalities in Goiás
