= Alexânia =

- Municipality
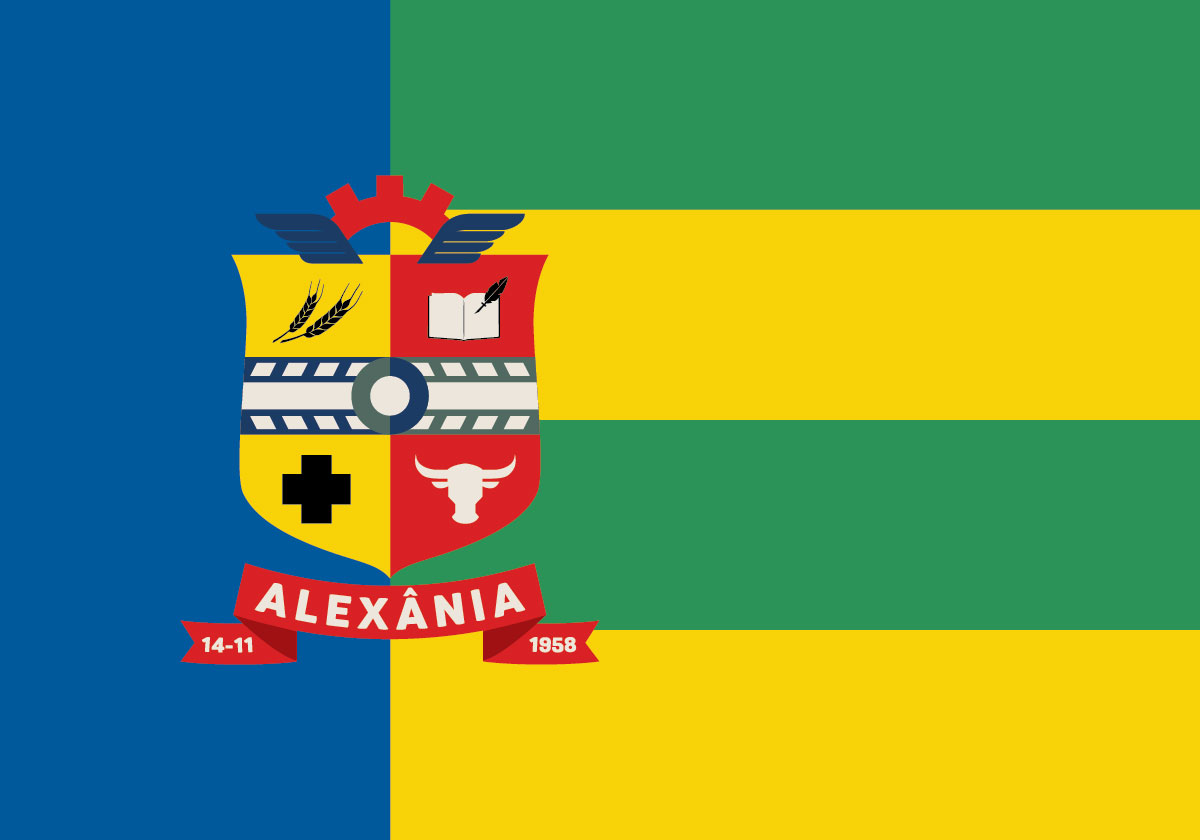
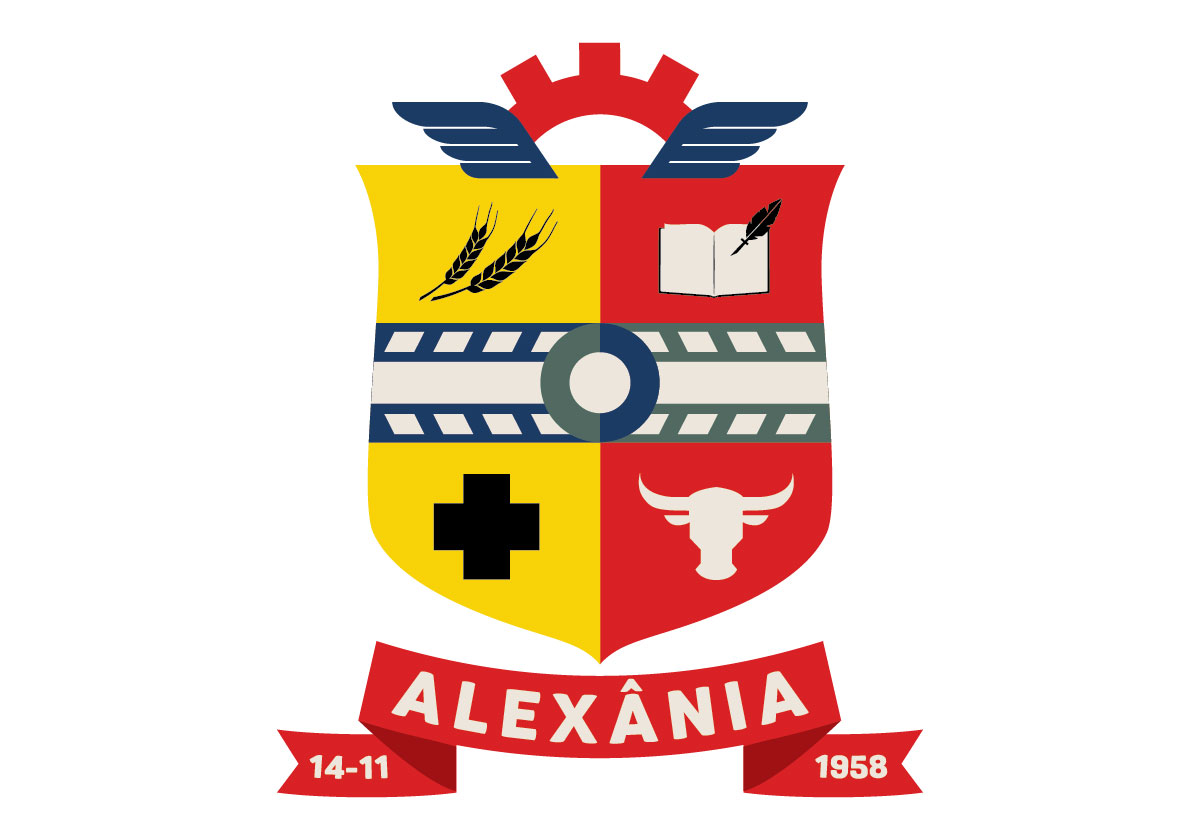
- Flag Coat of arms

- Location in Goiás state

- Location in Brazil
- Coordinates: 16°04′43″S 48°30′03″W
- Country: Brazil
- Region: Central-West
- State: Goiás
- Microregion: Entorno do Distrito Federal

Area
  - Total: 847.891 km^{2} (327.373 sq mi)
- Elevation: 1,057 m (3,468 ft)

Population (2020)
  - Total: 28,010
  - Density: 33.03/km^{2} (85.56/sq mi)
- Time zone: UTC−3 (BRT)
- Postal code: 72820-000
- Website: www.alexania.go.gov.br

Alexânia is a municipality in central Goiás state, Brazil. The Areias River passes through the municipality.

== Location ==
It is located on the main Brasília–Goiânia highway, GO-060, which has been recently widened to four lanes. The distance to Brasília is 130 km and 118 km to Goiânia. It is part of the Entorno do Distrito Federal statistical micro-region. Municipal boundaries are with:

- North: Corumbá de Goiás
- South: Abadiânia
- East: Santo Antônio do Descoberto
- West: Corumbá de Goiás and Abadiânia

Districts, Villages, and Hamlets

- Villages: Alvorada, Olhos d’Água and Estiva.
- Hamlet: Serra do Ouro.

== Economy ==
The city relies on agriculture and livestock raising, with ranches producing both meat and dairy cattle. There is a substantial poultry industry with 755,000 birds counted in 2006. There is also an intense commercial activity because of the highway traffic. Alexânia is also an important cluster of ‘Cachaça de alambique’ (artisanal sugar cane rum). The major ones are: Cambeba, Cachaça do Ministro, Cana Brava, Cachaça do Piloto. There were two bank branches in 2007.

The municipality still has a relatively unspoilt nature with some forest growth along the rivers. In recent years several rural hotels (‘hotéis-fazendas’) have opened up near the town offering what is known as eco-tourism to the urban inhabitants of Brasília. This activity supports more than 200 families.

Recently a beer brewery was established in the municipality providing needed jobs and giving the region the possibility of finally developing and benefiting from a higher standard of living. In the Seplan list of municipal development, which ranked 58 municipalities in the state based on dynamism, economic wealth, quality of life and other factors, Alexânia went from 51st place in 2003 to 18th place in 2004. Motor vehicles

- Automobiles: 2,510
- Pickup trucks: 233
- Number of inhabitants per motor vehicle: 7.3

Agricultural data 2006

- Farms: 638
- Total area: 31,901 ha.
- Area of permanent crops: 718 ha.
- Area of perennial crops: 3,820 ha.
- Area of pasture: 26,571 ha.
- Area of woodland and forests: 6,495 ha.
- Cattle herd: 39,559

Main crops in hectares

- Rice: 60
- Banana: 250
- Sugarcane: 200
- Oranges: 9
- Lemons: 12
- Passion fruit: 35
- Corn: 1,800
- Soybeans: 3,160
- Tangerines: 10
- Tomatoes: 40 (All data are from 2006)

== Health and education ==
- Schools: 27 (2006)
- Enrollment: 6,912
- Hospitals: 1 with 46 beds
- Literacy rate in 2000: 84.3%
- Infant mortality rate in 2000: 36.16
- MHDI: 0.696
- State ranking: 211 (out of 242 municipalities)
- National ranking: 3,056 (out of 5,505 municipalities)

== History ==
The establishment of Alexânia is connected to the construction of Brasília and the Federal District. In 1957 Alex Abdallah, the owner of the land, created the first lots on the edge of Highway 101, between Anápolis and the new capital. These lots were distributed to the population without cost. From the beginning the settlement was officially called Alexânia, honoring its founder.

At first Alexânia was only a "povoado" belonging to the municipality of Corumbá de Goiás. In 1959 it became part of a new municipality called Olhos d'Água, which had been created in 1956. In 1961 the growth of the new settlement caused the municipal seat to be moved to Alexânia, with the name remaining Olhos d'Água. In 1963 Olhos d'Água was renamed Alexânia.

== See also ==
- List of municipalities in Goiás
- Microregions of Goiás
