= Porteirão =

- Municipality
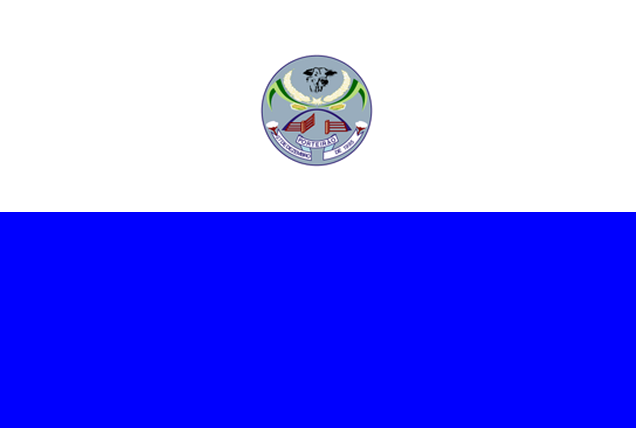
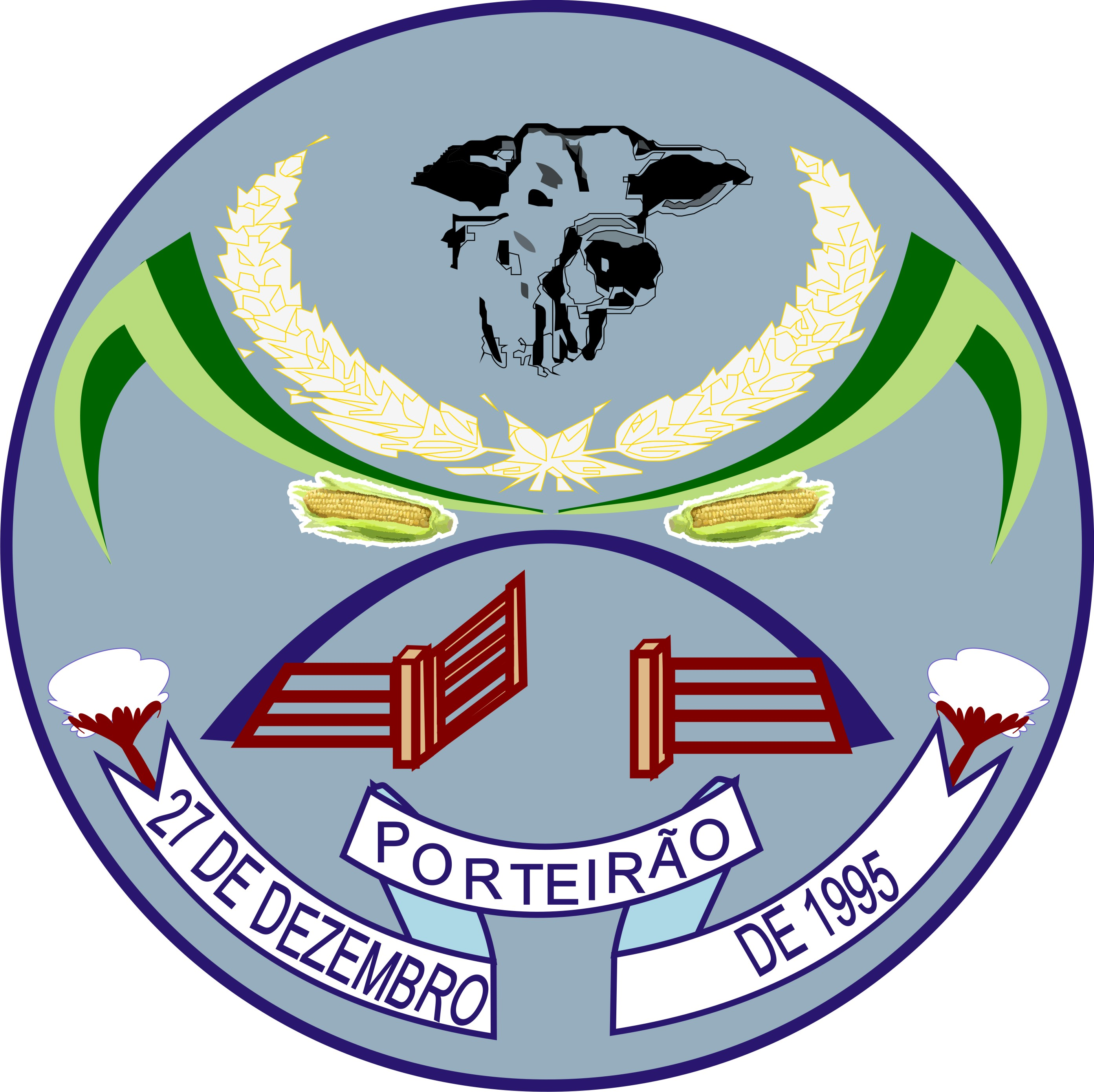
- Flag Coat of arms

- Location in Goiás state

- Location in Brazil
- Coordinates: 17°49′10″S 50°08′34″W
- Country: Brazil
- Region: Central-West
- State: Goiás
- Microregion: Meia Ponte Microregion

Area
  - Total: 603.9 km^{2} (233.2 sq mi)
- Elevation: 470 m (1,540 ft)

Population (2020)
  - Total: 3,931
  - Density: 6.509/km^{2} (16.86/sq mi)
- Time zone: UTC−3 (BRT)
- Postal code: 75603-000

Porteirão is a municipality in south Goiás state, Brazil.

== Geographical Information ==
Porteirão is located in the Meia Ponte Microregion in the Rio dos Bois basin. It is connected by a state highway (27 km.) with the BR-452 highway, which connects Rio Verde with Itumbiara.

The distance to the state capital, Goiânia, is 178 km. Highway connections from Goiânia are made by GO-040 / Aragoiânia / Cromínia / GO-319 / Pontalina / GO-040 / Aloândia / BR-452 / Bom Jesus de Goiás / GO-410. For the complete list of all distances in Goiás see Seplan

Neighboring municipalities are:

- north: Acreúna
- south: Goiatuba
- east: Vicentópolis and Goiatuba
- west: Santa Helena de Goiás

== Political Information ==
- Mayor: Pedro Augusto dos Reis (January 2005 to January 2009)

== Demographics ==
- Population density: 4.98 inhabitants/km^{2} (2007)
- Urban population: 2,726(2007)
- Rural population: 282 (2007)
- Population growth or loss: 0.91% from 2000/2007

== The economy ==
The economy is based on agriculture, cattle raising, services, public administration, and small transformation industries.

- Industrial units: 2 (2006)
- Commercial units: 45 (2006)
- Cattle herd: 24,280 head (2006)
- Main crops (2006): cotton, rice, sugarcane (13,000 hectares), beans, soybeans (18,000 hectares), sorghum, and corn.
- People employed in agriculture: 1,670
- Number of farming establishments: 43
- Area of the farming establishments: 27,367 ha.
- Area in planted crops: 17,500 ha.
- Farming establishments with tractors: 14

== Education (2006) ==
- Schools: 2 with 821 students
- Higher education: none
- Adult literacy rate: 80.4% (2000) (national average was 86.4%)

== Health (2007) ==
- Hospitals: 0
- Hospital beds: 0
- Ambulatory clinics: 1
- Infant mortality rate: 27.9 (2000) (national average was 33.0).

== Qualtity of Life ==
The municipality achieved a score of 0.724 on the United Nations Human Development Index (2000), ranking it 162 out of 242 municipalities in the state of Goiás. For the complete list see Frigoletto.com

== See also ==
- List of municipalities in Goiás
