= Vicentinópolis =

- Municipality
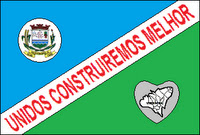
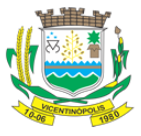
- Flag Coat of arms

- Location in Goiás state

- Location in Brazil
- Coordinates: 17°43′40″S 49°47′21″W
- Country: Brazil
- Region: Central-West
- State: Goiás
- Microregion: Meia Ponte Microregion

Area
  - Total: 737.2 km^{2} (284.6 sq mi)
- Elevation: 646 m (2,119 ft)

Population (2020)
  - Total: 8,873
  - Density: 12.04/km^{2} (31.17/sq mi)
- Time zone: UTC−3 (BRT)
- Postal code: 75555-000

Vicentinópolis is a municipality in south Goiás state, Brazil. The population was 8,873 inhabitants in 2020 in a total area of 737.2 km^{2}.

== Location ==
Vicentinópolis is located in the Meia Ponte Microregion, 22 kilometers west of Joviânia and 65 kilometers south of Edéia. The distance to the state capital, Goiânia, is 176 km. Highway connections are made by BR-060 / Abadia de Goiás / Guapó / Indiara / GO-320 / Edéia. For a list of distances see Sepin

Neighboring municipalities are:

- north: Edéia
- south: Porteirão and Goiatuba
- east: Joviânia and Pontalina
- west: Edéia

Vicentinópolis began as a district of Pontalina in 1964, separating in 1980.

== Demographics ==
- Population density: 8.03 inhabitants/km^{2} (2007)
- Urban population: 5,189 (2007)
- Rural population: 730 (2007)
- Population growth: -0.23% from 2000/2007

== The economy ==
The economy is based on subsistence agriculture, cattle raising, services, public administration, and small transformation industries.

- Industrial units: 4 (2007)
- Commercial units: 97 (2007)
- Financial institutions: - Banco do Brasil S.A. - Banco Itaú S.A. (01/06/2005)
- Cattle herd: 34,545 head (6,660 milk cows) (2006)
- Main crops: rice, beans, manioc, corn, sorghum, wheat, tomatoes, and soybeans (38,500 hectares).
- Farms: 194
- Area of farms: 65,224
- Area of crops: 377 ha.
- Area of pasture: 30,833 ha.
- Farms with tractors: 101

== Education (2006) ==
- Schools: 4 with 1,881 students
- Higher education: campus of the Universidade Estadual de Goiás
- Adult literacy rate: 84.1% (2000) (national average was 86.4%)

== Health (2007) ==
- Hospitals: 2
- Hospital beds: 32
- Ambulatory clinics: 2
- Infant mortality rate: 14.96 (2000) (national average was 33.0).

The municipality achieved a score of 0.773 on the United Nations Human Development Index, placing it in 37th place out of 242 municipalities in the state of Goiás. (2000) For the complete list see Frigoletto.com

== See also ==
- List of municipalities in Goiás
