= Microregion of Iporá =

Coordinates: 16°26′31″S 51°07′04″W

Iporá
- Microregion
- Location in Goias state
- Country: Brazil
- State: Goiás
- Mesoregion: Centro Goiano
- Municipalities: 10

Area
  - Total: 7,096.60 km^{2} (2,740.01 sq mi)

Population (2007)
  - Total: 58,845
  - Density: 8.3/km^{2} (21/sq mi)

The Iporá Microregion is a geographical region in central-western Goiás state, Brazil.

== Municipalities ==
The microregion consists of the following municipalities:

Municipality	Area (km^{2})	Inhabitants in 2007, July	Inhabitants in 2000
Amorinópolis	410	3,527	4.018
Cachoeira de Goiás	417	1,410	1,259
Córrego do Ouro	464	2,633	2,939
Fazenda Nova	1,286	6,373	7,832
Iporá	1,030	31,060	32,537
Israelândia	580	2,827	3,457
Ivolândia	1,267	2,718	3,184
Jaupaci	529	2,998	2,643
Moiporá	462	1,848	1,899
Novo Brasil	652	3,451	4,262

== See also ==
- List of municipalities in Goiás
- Microregions of Goiás
