= Santo Antônio de Goiás =

- Municipality
- Flag

- Location in Goiás state

- Location in Brazil
- Coordinates: 16°29′08″S 49°18′32″W
- Country: Brazil
- Region: Central-West
- State: Goiás
- Microregion: Goiânia Microregion

Area
  - Total: 132.8 km^{2} (51.3 sq mi)
- Elevation: 762 m (2,500 ft)

Population (2020)
  - Total: 6,440
  - Density: 48.5/km^{2} (126/sq mi)
- Time zone: UTC−3 (BRT)
- Postal code: 75374-000

Santo Antônio de Goiás is a municipality in central Goiás state, Brazil, located just north of the state capital, Goiânia.

- Distance from Goiânia: 42 km. with connections by way of GO-462.

== Location ==
Neighboring municipalities are:

- north: Brazabrantes
- south: Goiânia
- east: Nerópolis
- west: Goianira

== Political Information ==
- Mayor: Lourival Vaz da Costa (January 2005)
- City council: 9
- Eligible voters: 2,859 (December/2007)

Santo Antônio was a district of Goianira until it was dismembered in 1990.

== Demographic Information ==
- Population density: 29.31 inhabitants/km^{2} (2007)
- Urban population: 3,508 (2007)
- Rural population: 385 (2007)
- Population growth: 3.28% from 2000 to 2007

== Economic Information ==
The economy is based on subsistence agriculture, cattle raising, services, public administration, and small transformation industries.

- Cattle herd: 17,500 head (2006)
- Main crops: bananas, sugarcane, rice (400 hectares), beans, manioc, oranges, lemons, tangerines, corn (800 hectares), tomatoes, and soybeans.

== Education (2006) ==
- Schools: 3
- Classrooms: 26
- Teachers: 52
- Students: 1,258
- Higher education: none
- Adult literacy rate: 86.7% (2000) (national average was 86.4%)

== Health (2007) ==
- Hospitals: 1
- Hospital beds: 0
- Ambulatory clinics: 3
- Infant mortality rate: 20.96 (2000) (national average was 33.0.

== Municipal Human Development Index ==
- MHDI: 0.749
- State ranking: 79/242 municipalities
- National ranking: 1,904/5,507 municipalities

Frigoletto.com

== See also ==
- List of municipalities in Goiás
