= Leandro Leite =

Brazilian association football player

Personal information
- Full name: Leandro Leite Mateus
- Date of birth: 27 December 1982 (age 43)
- Place of birth: Piracanjuba, Brazil
- Height: 1.81 m (5 ft 11 in)
- Position: Midfielder

Team information
- Current team: Pelotas

Senior career*
Years	Team	Apps	(Gls)
2004–2007	Ceilândia	?	(?)
2008	Goytacaz	0	(0)
2009	Democrata	0	(0)
2010	Americano	7	(0)
2010	Metropolitano	2	(0)
2011	Brusque	13	(0)
2012	São José	0	(0)
2012–2020	Brasil de Pelotas	273	(4)
2021–	Pelotas	9	(0)
- * Club domestic league appearances and goals as of 08:30, 14 June 2019 (UTC)

Leandro Leite Mateus is a Brazilian footballer who plays as a midfielder for São Luiz. He has captained the club Brasil de Pelotas since 2012 and made over 300 appearances in all competitions for them, during which they have climbed from the second division of the state competition to Campeonato Brasileiro Série B.

Previously he has represented Ceilândia in Campeonato Brasileiro Série C between 2004 and 2007. He also represented Metropolitano in 2010 Campeonato Brasileiro Série D and Brusque in 2011 Campeonato Brasileiro Série D.
