= Guaraíta =

- Municipality
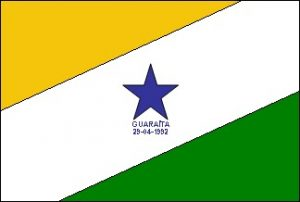
- Flag

- Location in Goiás state

- Location in Brazil
- Coordinates: 15°44′45″S 50°00′37″W
- Country: Brazil
- Region: Central-West
- State: Goiás
- Microregion: Ceres

Area
  - Total: 205 km^{2} (79 sq mi)
- Elevation: 669 m (2,195 ft)

Population (2020)
  - Total: 1,951
  - Density: 9.52/km^{2} (24.6/sq mi)
- Time zone: UTC−3 (BRT)
- Postal code: 76690-000

Guaraíta is a municipality in central Goiás state, Brazil.

== Location ==
It is included in the Ceres Microregion and is bordered on the north and east by the municipalities of Itapuranga and on the west and south by Goiás.

Highway connections from Goiânia are made by GO-070 / Goianira / Itaberaí / GO-156 / Itapuranga / GO-525. See Seplan. The nearest major city is Goiás, 35 km. away.

== Demographics ==
The population has been decreasing since 1980. The urban population is slightly larger than the rural population:

- Urban population in 2007: 1,478
- Rural population in 2007: 916

== The economy ==
The economy is based on agriculture (rice, beans, manioc, corn, and bananas), and cattle raising (20,200 head in 2006. There were 14 retail establishments. There were 325 farms in 2006 with a total area of 15,285 hectares, of which 600 hectares were cropland. There were 109 automobiles in 2007.

== Health and education ==
The literacy rate was 82.9% in 2000 while the infant mortality rate was 33.15 in 1,000 live births. There were only 2 schools with 718 students (2006). There were no hospitals and only 4 doctors.

=== Rating on the Municipal Human Development Index ===
- MHDI: 0.697
- State ranking: 210 (out of 242 municipalities in 2000)
- National ranking: 3,039 (out of 5,507 municipalities in 2000)

For the complete list see frigoletto.com.br

== See also ==
- List of municipalities in Goiás
