= Campo Limpo de Goiás =

- Municipality
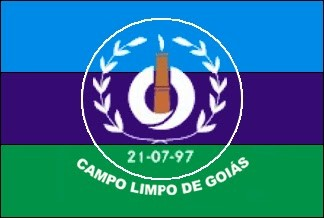
- Flag

- Location in Goiás state

- Location in Brazil
- Coordinates: 16°17′42″S 49°05′05″W
- Country: Brazil
- Region: Central-West
- State: Goiás
- Microregion: Anápolis Microregion

Area
  - Total: 156.0 km^{2} (60.2 sq mi)
- Elevation: 880 m (2,890 ft)

Population (2020)
  - Total: 7,940
  - Density: 50.9/km^{2} (132/sq mi)
- Time zone: UTC−3 (BRT)
- Postal code: 74085-000

Campo Limpo de Goiás is a municipality in central Goiás state, Brazil. It separated from the municipality of Anápolis in 1997.

The distance to the state capital, Goiânia, is 75 km and connections are made by BR-153, passing through Anápolis, and then taking GO-330.

== Demographic and Political Data ==
- IBGE statistical microregion: Anápolis Microregion
- Population density in 2007: 35.83 inhabitants/km^{2}
- Urban population in 2007: 4,534
- Rural population in 2007: 1,062
- Eligible voters in 2007: 4,798
- Mayor: Joaquim Silveira Duarte
- Vice-mayor: Carlos Alberto de Carvalho

== Economy ==
The economy is based on cattle raising (17,500 head in 2006), both for meat and dairy. There are also banana, corn, rice, sugarcane, and soybean plantations.

- Industrial establishments: 14
- Retail commerce establishments: 36
- Automobiles: 299 (2007)
- Banks: none (August 2007)

Agricultural data 2006

- Number of Farms: 228
- Total area: 10,413 ha.
- Area of permanent crops: 503 ha.
- Area of perennial crops: 1,122 ha.
- Area of natural pasture: 6,839 ha.
- Area of woodland and forests: 1,231 ha.
- Persons dependent on farming: 2,350
- Farms with tractors: 38
- Number of tractors: 53
- Cattle herd: 17,500 head IBGE

== Health and education ==
- Schools in activity: 2 (2006)
- Classrooms: 26
- Teachers: 62
- Total number of students: 1,622
- Hospitals: none (2007)
- Walk-in health clinics: 1 (2005)

== See also ==
- List of municipalities in Goiás
