= Mairipotaba =

- Municipality
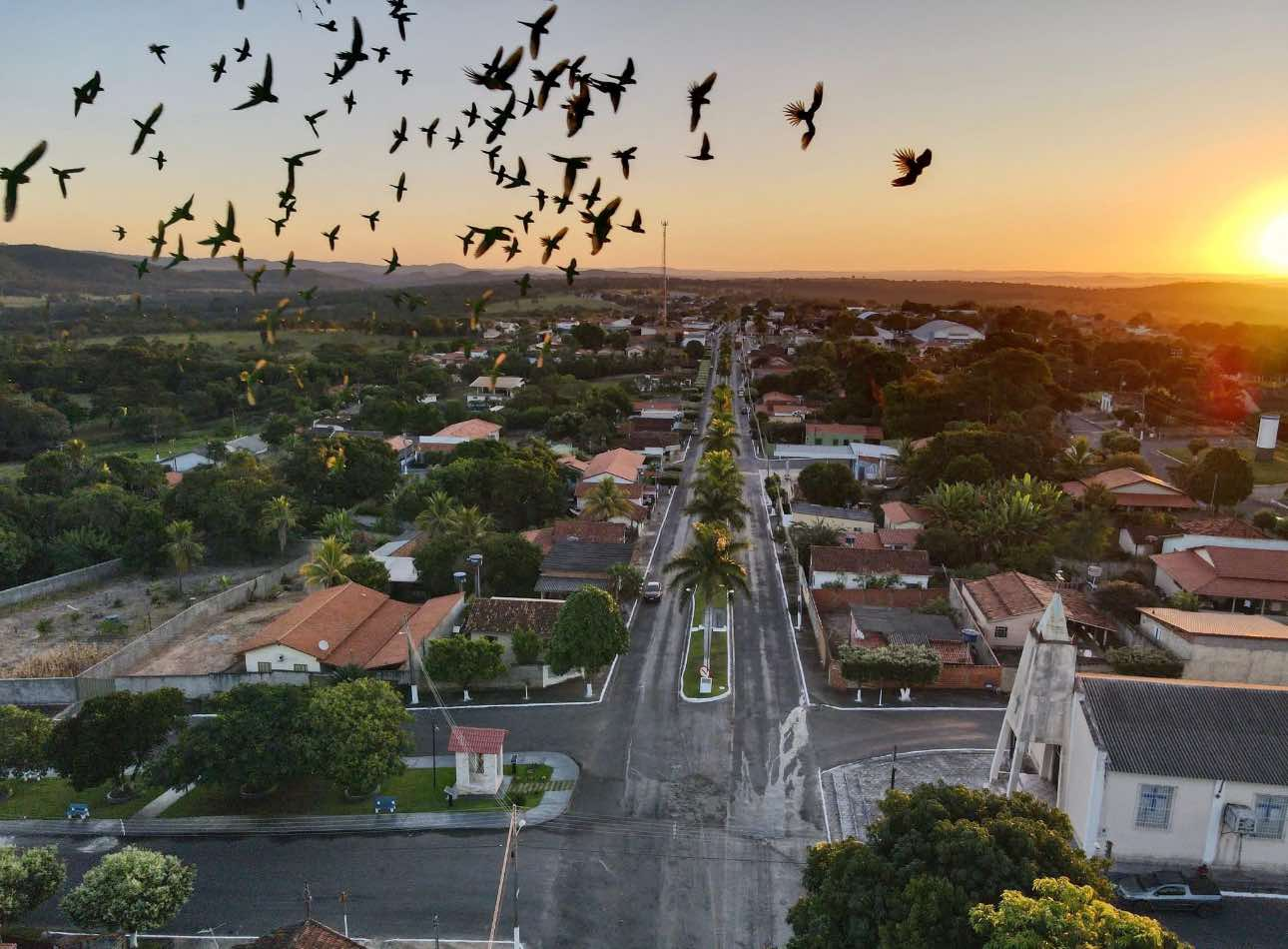
- Aerial view of Mairipotaba

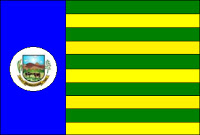
- Flag

- Location in Goiás state

- Location in Brazil
- Coordinates: 17°17′53″S 49°29′29″W
- Country: Brazil
- Region: Central-West
- State: Goiás
- Microregion: Meia Ponte Microregion
  - Carlos Henrique Rodrigues Pereira: (Partido Progressista)

Area
  - Total: 460.9 km^{2} (178.0 sq mi)
- Elevation: 658 m (2,159 ft)

Population (2020)
  - Total: 2,363
  - Density: 5.127/km^{2} (13.28/sq mi)
- Time zone: UTC−3 (BRT)
- Postal code: 75630-000

Mairipotaba is a municipality, in south Goiás state, Brazil.

== Location and Municipal boundaries ==
Mairipotaba is located in the Meia Ponte Microregion about 85 kilometers directly south of the state capital, Goiânia. It has highway connections with Varjão, 36 kilometers to the north, Aragoiânia, 38 kilometers to the north, and Professor Jamil, 32 kilometers to the west. The important Rio dos Bois passes to the west.

Municipal boundaries are with:

- North: Varjão
- South: Pontalina
- East: Cromínia and Professor Jamil
- West: Edealina

== History ==
Mairipotaba began with the installation of a telegraph station at the end of the nineteenth century. In 1896 there were a few huts made of palm fronds surrounding the only solid construction—the telegraph station. The first name was São Sebastião do Atolador. With this name the settlement became a district of Piracanjuba, formerly known as Pouso Alto, in 1904. In 1920 the name was abbreviated to Atolador, being changed again to Sâo Sebastião do Atolador in 1933. In 1933 the name was changed to Serrania. In 1943 the name was changed to Mairipotaba, the same year that Pouso Alto became Piracanjuba. In 1950 it was dismembered to become a municipality.

== Political data ==
For the period of 2017-2020 the mayor is Carlos Henrique Rodrigues Pereira and the vice-mayor is João Batista Narciso Sobrinho. There were 9 members on the city council. The number of eligible voters was 2,542 (2019).

- The municipality included the municipal seat together with two "povoado" (village) of Dois Irmãos and Paraíso.

== Demographic Data ==
The population density was 5.76 inhabitants/km^{2} in 2007. The population has been decreasing since 1980 when it was 2,670. From 1996 to 2000 the population decreased 2,21.%, but increased 1.43% from 2000 to 2007. As in most municipalities in the state the rural population has diminished and the urban population has decreased. In 1980 the rural population was 1,822 while in 2007 it had diminished to 1,032.

== Economy ==
The economy is based on services, small transformation industries, agriculture, and cattle raising. In June 2006 there was 01 industrial unit and 23 retail units. There were no bank institutions as of 2007.

The cattle herd had 34,400 head in 2006 and the main agricultural products were rice, oranges, manioc, corn, and soybeans. Only corn and soybeans surpassed a planted area of 1,000 hectares in 2006. In 2006 there were 279 farms with 2,257 hectares under cultivation. Only 73 of these farms had tractors in 2006. (IBGE)

== Health and education ==
In 2007 there was one hospital with 18 beds and 2 walk-in health clinics. The infant mortality rate was 19.67 deaths in every 1,000 live births in 2000. This was below the state and national average. In the school system there were 2 schools with 810 students in 2006. The literacy rate was 85.3% in 2000.

Mairipotaba had a rating of 0.761 on the latest United Nations Human Development Index, ranking it 51 out of 242 cities in the state of Goiás in 2000. For the complete list see Frigoletto

== See also ==
- List of municipalities in Goiás
- Meia Ponte Microregion
