= Aloândia =

- Municipality
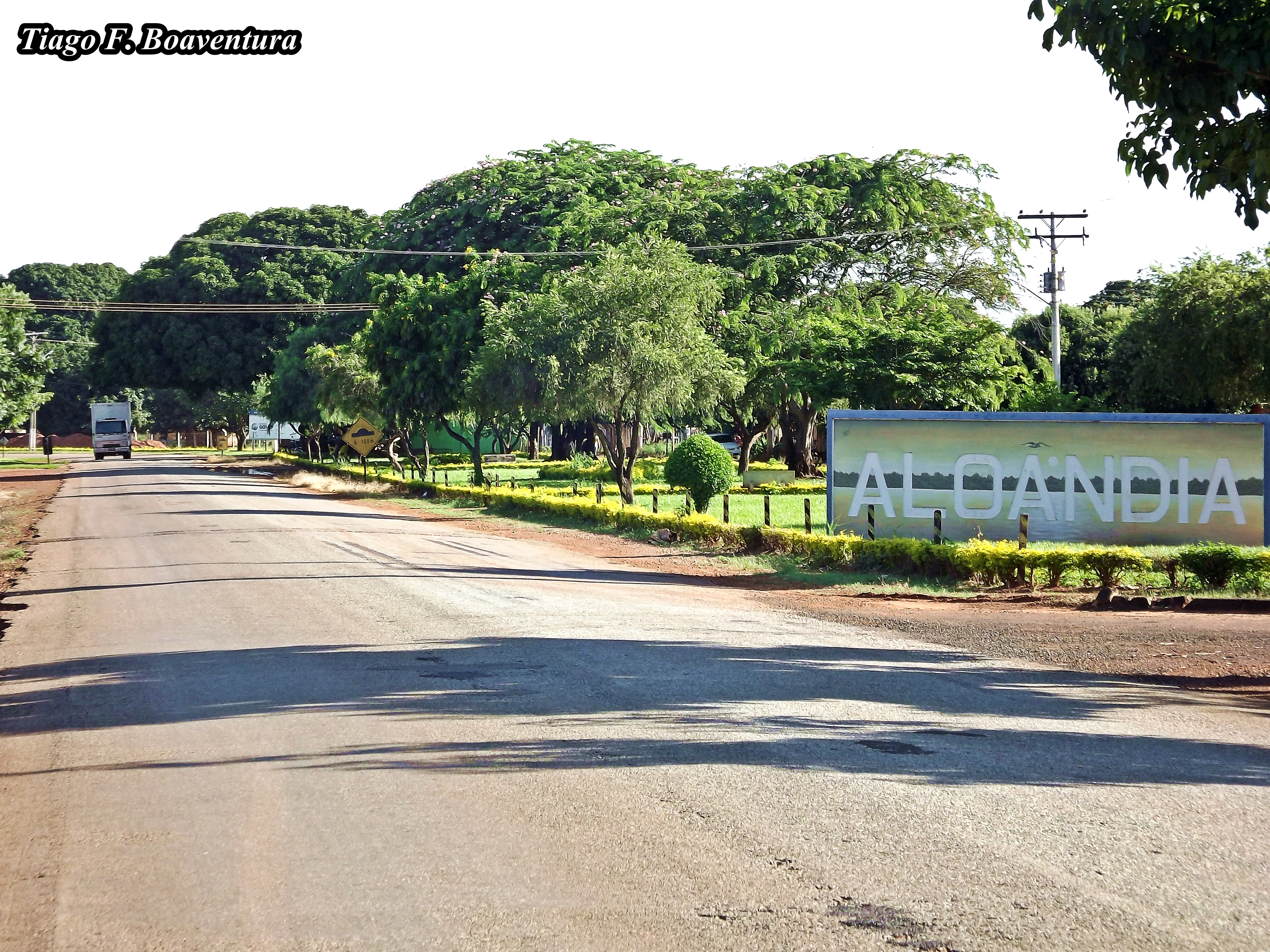

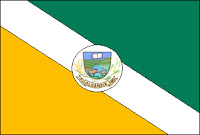
- Flag

- Location in Goiás state

- Location in Brazil
- Coordinates: 17°43′42″S 49°28′14″W
- Country: Brazil
- Region: Central-West
- State: Goiás
- Microregion: Meia Ponte Microregion

Area
  - Total: 102.1 km^{2} (39.4 sq mi)
- Elevation: 672 m (2,205 ft)

Population (2020)
  - Total: 1,986
  - Density: 19.45/km^{2} (50.38/sq mi)
- Time zone: UTC−3 (BRT)
- Postal code: 75615-000

Aloândia is a municipality in south Goiás state, Brazil. The population was 1,986 in 2020 and the municipal area was 102.1 km^{2}, one of the smallest in the state of Goiás.

== Geographical information ==
Aloândia is located in the Meia Ponte Microregion, 35 kilometers south of Pontalina and 35 kilometers west of the important BR-135 highway, which connects São Paulo with Belém.

The distance to the state capital, Goiânia, is 132 km. Highway connections are made by BR-153 / Aparecida de Goiânia / Professor Jamil / Pontalina / GO-217 / GO -040. See Sepin

Neighboring municipalities:

- north and west: Pontalina
- south: Joviânia
- east: Morrinhos

== History ==
Construction of the first houses of the settlement called São João, after a ranch nearby, began in 1941. The name was later changed to "Itambé", meaning waterfall, from the waterfalls coming down from the nearby hills. In 1948 it was elevated to district in the municipality of Pontalina with a new name, "Aloândia", meaning "praise to the light". In 1953 it became a municipality.

== Demographic and political data ==
- Population density: 20.21 inhabitants/km^{2} (2007)
- Population growth rate: 1996/2007 0.19.%
- Population in 2007: 2,065
- Population in 1980: 2.233
- Urban population: 1,761 (2007)
- Rural population: 304
- City government: mayor (Cássio Vieira Sampaio), vice-mayor (Cleusa Edir Lopes Vieira), and 09 council members

== Economy ==
The economy is based on cattle raising, services, government organs (city government, health centers, and schools), and agriculture. the main agricultural products were bananas, hearts of palm, rice, corn, and soybeans.

- There were 22 retail commerce establishments in 2007
- There was one financial institution in the town in 2007: Bradesco S.A.
- There were 16,355 head of cattle. (2006)

In 2003 most workers were employed in public administration, defense, and social security.

Agricultural data 2006

- Farms: 182
- Total area: 5,236 ha.
- Area of permanent crops: 23 ha.
- Area of perennial crops: 766 ha.
- Area of natural pasture: 3,336 ha.
- Area of woodland and forests: 888 ha.
- Persons dependent on farming: 390
- Farms with tractors: 33
- Number of tractors: 49 IBGE

== Health and education ==
In 2007 there was one health clinic and 1 small hospital with 16 beds. There were 479 students in 02 primary schools.

The United Nations Human Development Index (2000) ranked Aloândia 93 out of 242 municipalities in the state of Goiás with a score of 0.744 and 2,052 out of 5,507 municipalities in Brazil. For the complete list see Frigoletto.

== See also ==
- List of municipalities in Goiás
