= Caldazinha =

- Municipality
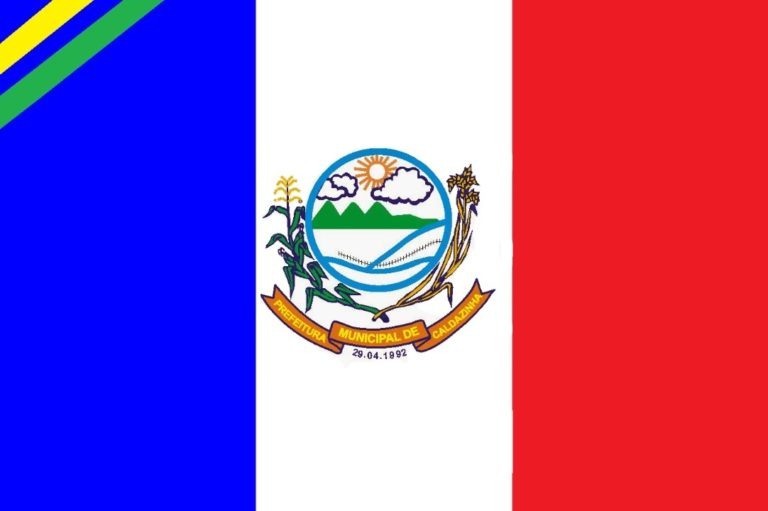
- Flag

- Location in Goiás state

- Location in Brazil
- Coordinates: 16°42′53″S 48°59′58″W
- Country: Brazil
- Region: Central-West
- State: Goiás
- Microregion: Goiânia Microregion

Area
  - Total: 312.0 km^{2} (120.5 sq mi)
- Elevation: 866 m (2,841 ft)

Population (2020)
  - Total: 3,848
  - Density: 12.33/km^{2} (31.94/sq mi)
- Time zone: UTC−3 (BRT)
- Postal code: 75245-000

Caldazinha is a municipality in central Goiás state, Brazil. The population was 3,848 (2020) in a total area of 312 km^{2}.

Located 27 kilometers from the state capital, Goiânia, Caldazinha belongs to the Goiânia Microregion. Connections are made by GO-403 / passing through Senador Canedo.

Municipal boundaries are:

- north: Bonfinópolis and Leopoldo de Bulhões
- west: Senador Canedo
- south: Bela Vista de Goiás.

== Demographic and political facts ==
(All data are from 2007 unless otherwise mentioned)

Caldazinha's population distribution is characterized by an almost equal distribution between urban and rural inhabitants.

- Population density: 10.13 inhabitants/km^{2}
- Population growth rate 2000/2007: 2.06%
- Urban population: 1,739
- Rural population: 1,418
- Eligible voters: 2,532
- City government: mayor (Jucelino Braz de Castro), vice-mayor (Paulo Roberto de Oliveira), and 09 councilmembers

== Economy ==
The main economic activity of Caldazinha is cattle raising (25,300 head—5,330 milking cows). Some residents have been investing in the commercialization of paca meat, which although considered expensive, has been finding its niche in the market. There is also a small factory producing leather goods for farm use.

Other agricultural products are honey, bananas, oranges, rice, sugarcane, manioc, and corn (700 hectares). Source: IBGE

- financial institutions: none
- retail establishments: 16
- industrial units: 6

== Health ==
- Infant mortality rate in 2000: 24.80
- Hospitals: 0
- Public health clinics: 1 (IBGE 2007)

== Education ==
- Literacy rate in 2000: 87.8
- schools: 4
- classrooms: 30
- teachers: 45
- students: 1,017
- higher education: none (IBGE 2006)

Human Development Index: 0.742

- State ranking: 98 (out of 242 municipalities)
- National ranking: 2,090 (out of 5,507 municipalities)

== See also ==
- List of municipalities in Goiás
