= Bonfinópolis =

- Municipality
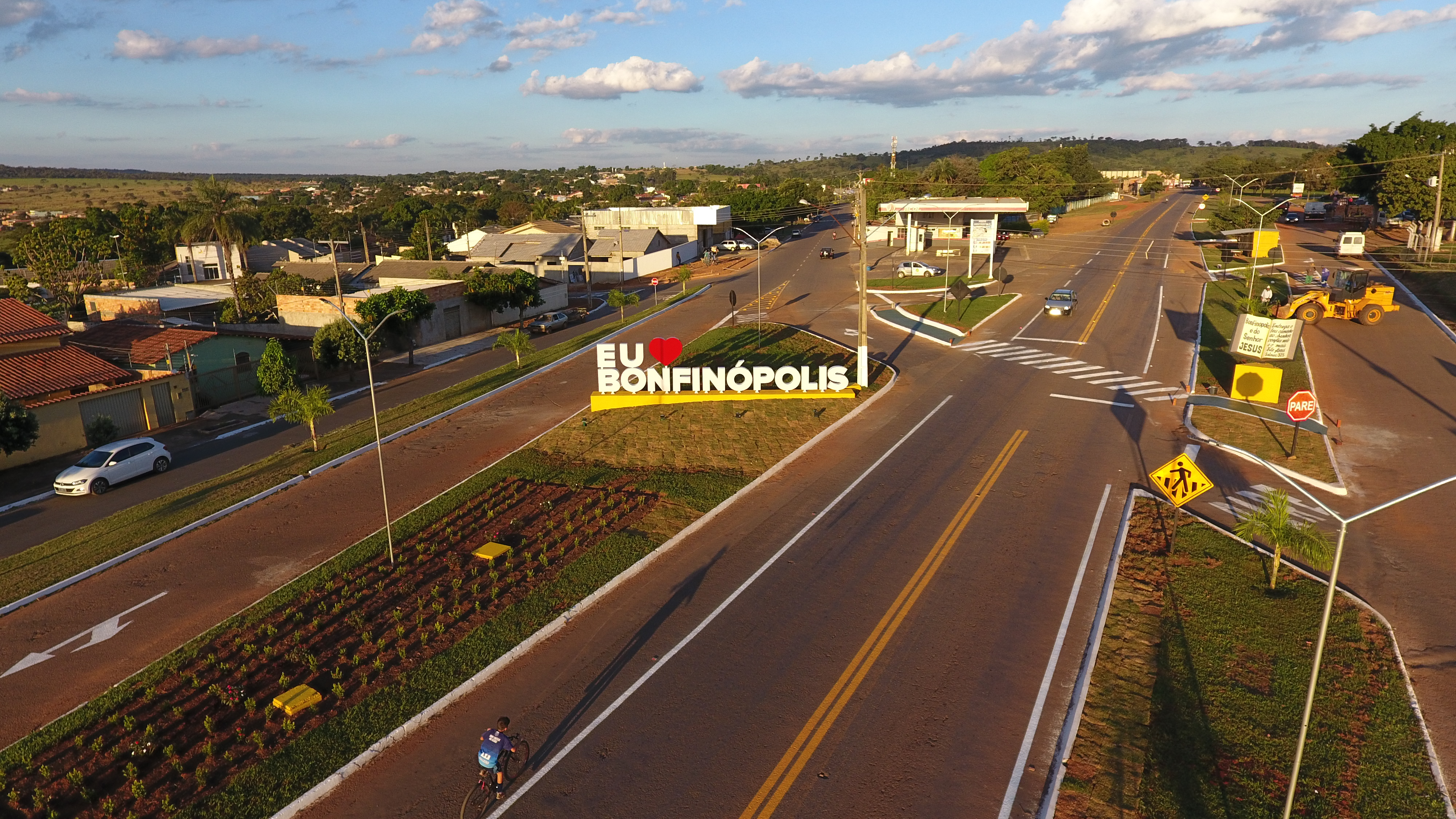
- View of Bonfinópolis

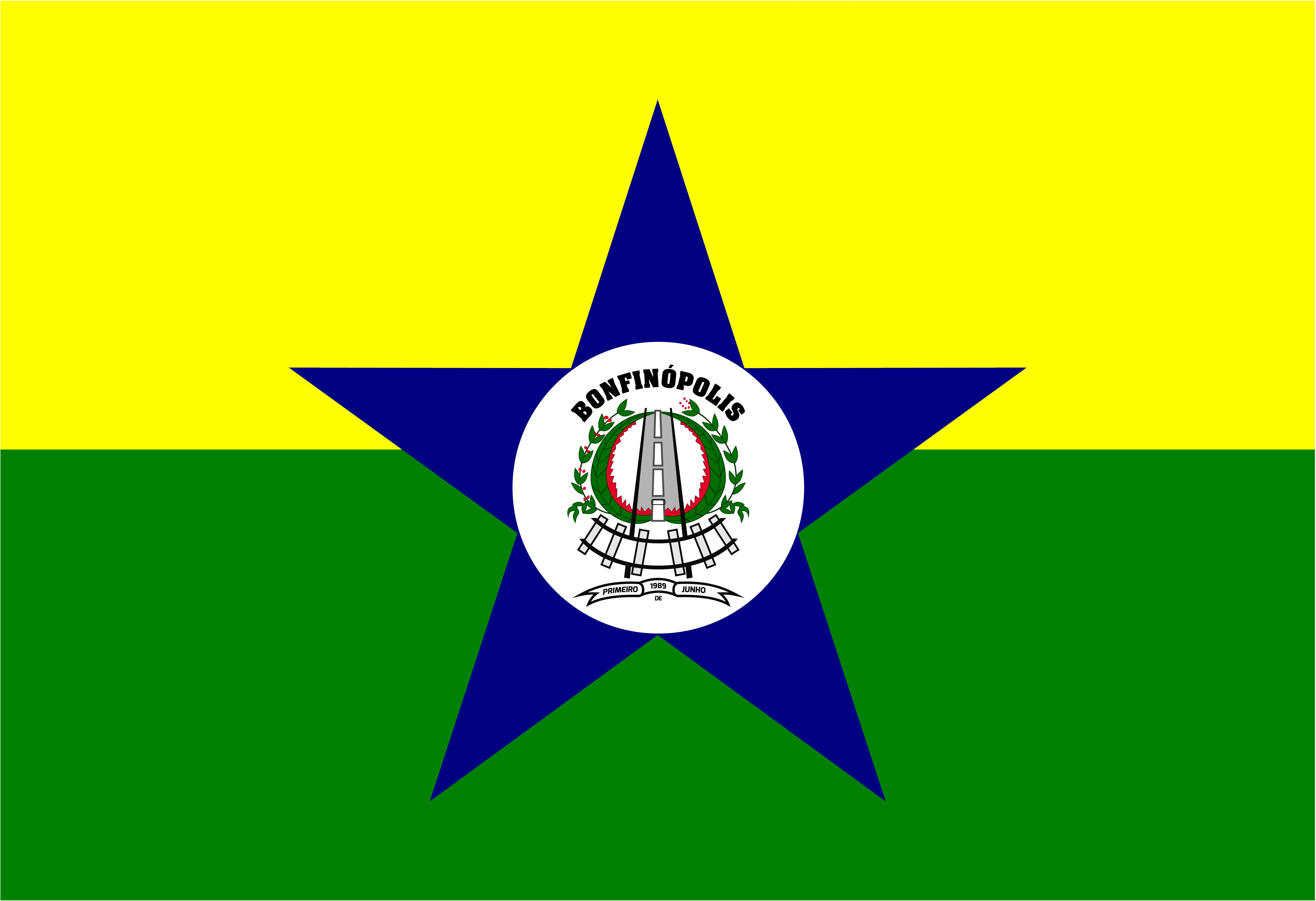
- Flag

- Location in Goiás state

- Location in Brazil
- Coordinates: 16°37′02″S 48°57′36″W
- Country: Brazil
- Region: Central-West
- State: Goiás
- Microregion: Goiânia Microregion

Area
  - Total: 122.2 km^{2} (47.2 sq mi)
- Elevation: 948 m (3,110 ft)

Population (2020)
  - Total: 9,919
  - Density: 81.17/km^{2} (210.2/sq mi)
- Time zone: UTC−3 (BRT)
- Postal code: 75195-000

Bonfinópolis is a municipality in central Goiás state, Brazil. It is located a short distance east of Goiânia and is part of the Goiânia metropolitan area.

The distance to Goiânia is 33 km. and connections are made by BR-457 / GO-010.

Neighboring municipalities are:

- north: Goianápolis
- south: Senador Canedo and Caldazinha
- east: Leopoldo de Bulhões
- west: Goiânia

== Population and political data ==
- Population density in 2007: 55.16 inhabitants/km^{2}
- Population growth rate from 2001 to 2007: 3.35%
- Population in 1980: 3,324
- Population in 1991: 4,303
- Urban population in 2007: 6,167
- Rural population in 2007: 577
- Eligible voters in 12/2007: 5,764
- City government: mayor (Antônio das Graças Filho), vice-mayor (Lázaro da Silva Borges), and 9 councilpersons

== Economy ==
The economy is based on cattle raising (11800 head in 2006), milk production, agriculture, commerce, public administration, and small transformation industries. There was modest production of oranges, coffee, manioc, rice, and tomatoes. (IBGE 2006)

== Health ==
- infant mortality in 2000: 27.7
- infant mortality in 1990: 28.5
- hospitals: 1 (2007)
- hospital beds: 20
- doctors / nurses / dentists in the public system: 8 / 1 / 0 (2002)

== Education ==
- literacy rate in 2000: 85.5
- literacy rate in 1991: 74.0
- school enrollment in 2006: 2,016 in 4 schools

(IBGE 2006)

- HDI: 0.723
- State ranking: 163 out of 242 municipalities
- National ranking: 2,557 out of 5,507 municipalities

For the complete list see

== See also ==
- List of municipalities in Goiás
