= Três Marcos =

- Hamlet
- Location in Brazil
- Coordinates: 16°0′34″S 51°11′23″W
- Country: Brazil
- State: Goiás
- Municipality: Fazenda Nova
- Time zone: UTC-3 (BRT)
- Postal code: 76220-000

Três Marcos is a village in the municipality of Fazenda Nova, Goiás, Brazil. Três Marcos has a population of 134 who are able to vote in Brazil's election. Três Marcos also has a municipal school named Escola Municipal Ismael Martins Ferreira, which has the village's polling station.
