= Morro Agudo de Goiás =

- Municipality
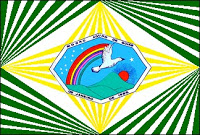
- Flag

- Location in Goiás state

- Location in Brazil
- Coordinates: 15°19′13″S 50°03′12″W
- Country: Brazil
- Region: Central-West
- State: Goiás
- Microregion: Ceres

Area
  - Total: 283 km^{2} (109 sq mi)
- Elevation: 691 m (2,267 ft)

Population (2020)
  - Total: 2,232
  - Density: 7.89/km^{2} (20.4/sq mi)
- Time zone: UTC−3 (BRT)
- Postal code: 76355-000

Morro Agudo de Goiás is a municipality in northeastern Goiás state, Brazil.

== Location ==
Monte Agudo de Goiás is located in the north-eastern region of the state near the source of the Rio Tesouras, which flows north into the Araguaia River.

- Distance to Goiânia: 212 km.
- Distance to Itapuranga: 35 km.
- Highway connections: GO-070 from Goiânia to Itaberaí, GO-156 north to Itapuranga, passing through Diolândia. See Seplan

Neighboring municipalities: Rubiataba, Araguapaz, São Patrício, Itapuranga, and Faina

== Political and Demographic Information ==
In January 2005 the Mayor was Moisés Simião de Carvalho and the Vice-mayor was Sebastião Tavares de Oliveira. The city council had 9 members and there were 2,172 eligible voters in 2007.

In 2007 the population density was 8.28 inhabitants/km^{2}. The population has decreased since 1991, when it was 2,526. The geometric rate of increase between 1996 and 2007 was -0.09.%. In 2007 most of the population was urban with 1,567 living in the urban area and 772 living in the rural area.

== Economic Information ==
The economy was based on agriculture, cattle-raising, services, modest transformation industries and public administration. In 2007 there were 3 industrial units and 17 retail units. There were no banking institutions. The number of motor vehicles was modest: 144 automobiles, 9 trucks, 31 pickup trucks, and 234 motorcycles.

Due to the small area of the municipality the cattle herd was small: 32,000, of which 5,100 were milk cows. Raising of poultry and swine was modest. The main agricultural products were rice, bananas, sugarcane, beans, manioc, and corn. None of these exceeded 500 hectares in planted area. In 2006 there were 335 farms with a total area of 31,914 hectares, of which 500 hectares were cropland and 28,328 hectares were pasture.

== Health and education ==
In 2007 there was 1 hospital with 17 beds and 2 walk-in clinics. The infant mortality rate was 31.12 in every 1,000 live births in 2000, lower than the national rate of 35.0 in the same year.

In 2006 the school system had 5 schools, 18 classrooms, 37 teachers, and 695 students. One of the schools was middle and secondary level. There were no institutions of higher learning. The adult literacy rate was 85.7% in 2000, below the national average of 86.4% in the same year.

Ranking on the Municipal Human Development Index

- MHDI: 0.717
- State ranking: 180 (out of 242 municipalities)
- National ranking: 2,677 (out of 5,507 municipalities)

For the complete list see Frigoletto.com.br

== See also ==
- List of municipalities in Goiás
- Microregions of Goiás
