= List of municipalities in Goiás =

This is a list of the municipalities in the state of Goiás (GO), in the Central-West Region of Brazil. Goiás is divided into 246 municipalities, which are grouped into 18 microregions, which are grouped into 5 mesoregions.

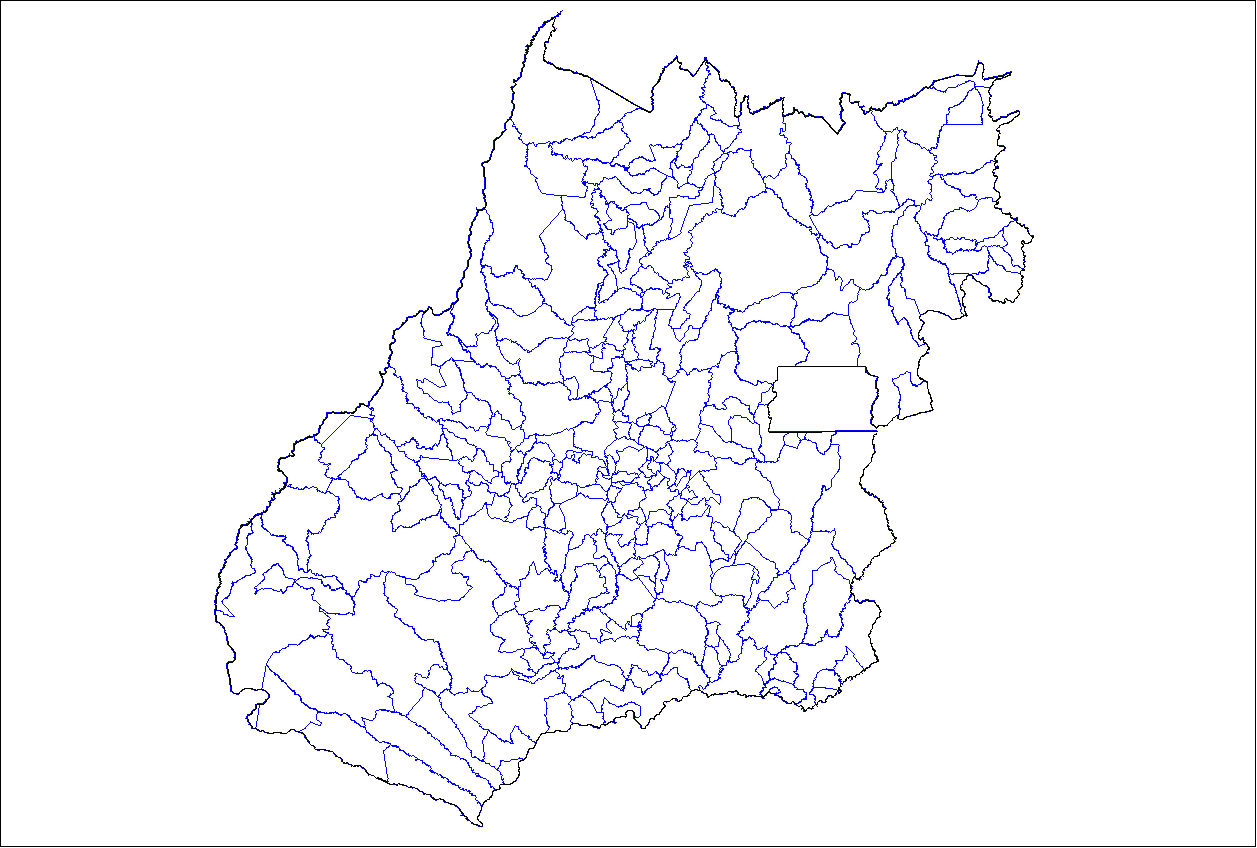
Municipalities of Goias, Brazil

== Ordered by regions ==
Mesoregion	Microregion	Municipality
Centro Goiano	Anápolis	Anápolis
Centro Goiano	Anápolis	Araçu
Centro Goiano	Anápolis	Brazabrantes
Centro Goiano	Anápolis	Campo Limpo de Goiás
Centro Goiano	Anápolis	Caturaí
Centro Goiano	Anápolis	Damolândia
Centro Goiano	Anápolis	Heitoraí
Centro Goiano	Anápolis	Inhumas
Centro Goiano	Anápolis	Itaberaí
Centro Goiano	Anápolis	Itaguari
Centro Goiano	Anápolis	Itaguaru
Centro Goiano	Anápolis	Itauçu
Centro Goiano	Anápolis	Jaraguá
Centro Goiano	Anápolis	Jesúpolis
Centro Goiano	Anápolis	Nova Veneza
Centro Goiano	Anápolis	Ouro Verde de Goiás
Centro Goiano	Anápolis	Petrolina de Goiás
Centro Goiano	Anápolis	Santa Rosa de Goiás
Centro Goiano	Anápolis	São Francisco de Goiás
Centro Goiano	Anápolis	Taquaral de Goiás
Centro Goiano	Anicuns	Adelândia
Centro Goiano	Anicuns	Americano do Brasil
Centro Goiano	Anicuns	Anicuns
Centro Goiano	Anicuns	Aurilândia
Centro Goiano	Anicuns	Avelinópolis
Centro Goiano	Anicuns	Buriti de Goiás
Centro Goiano	Anicuns	Firminópolis
Centro Goiano	Anicuns	Mossâmedes
Centro Goiano	Anicuns	Nazário
Centro Goiano	Anicuns	Sanclerlândia
Centro Goiano	Anicuns	Santa Bárbara de Goiás
Centro Goiano	Anicuns	São Luís de Montes Belos
Centro Goiano	Anicuns	Turvânia
Centro Goiano	Ceres	Barro Alto
Centro Goiano	Ceres	Carmo do Rio Verde
Centro Goiano	Ceres	Ceres
Centro Goiano	Ceres	Goianésia
Centro Goiano	Ceres	Guaraíta
Centro Goiano	Ceres	Guarinos
Centro Goiano	Ceres	Hidrolina
Centro Goiano	Ceres	Ipiranga de Goiás
Centro Goiano	Ceres	Itapaci
Centro Goiano	Ceres	Itapuranga
Centro Goiano	Ceres	Morro Agudo de Goiás
Centro Goiano	Ceres	Nova América
Centro Goiano	Ceres	Nova Glória
Centro Goiano	Ceres	Pilar de Goiás
Centro Goiano	Ceres	Rialma
Centro Goiano	Ceres	Rianápolis
Centro Goiano	Ceres	Rubiataba
Centro Goiano	Ceres	Santa Isabel
Centro Goiano	Ceres	Santa Rita do Novo Destino
Centro Goiano	Ceres	São Luíz do Norte
Centro Goiano	Ceres	São Patrício
Centro Goiano	Ceres	Uruana
Centro Goiano	Goiânia	Abadia de Goiás
Centro Goiano	Goiânia	Aparecida de Goiânia
Centro Goiano	Goiânia	Aragoiânia
Centro Goiano	Goiânia	Bela Vista de Goiás
Centro Goiano	Goiânia	Bonfinópolis
Centro Goiano	Goiânia	Caldazinha
Centro Goiano	Goiânia	Goianápolis
Centro Goiano	Goiânia	Goiânia (State Capital)
Centro Goiano	Goiânia	Goianira
Centro Goiano	Goiânia	Guapó
Centro Goiano	Goiânia	Hidrolândia
Centro Goiano	Goiânia	Leopoldo de Bulhões
Centro Goiano	Goiânia	Nerópolis
Centro Goiano	Goiânia	Santo Antônio de Goiás
Centro Goiano	Goiânia	Senador Canedo
Centro Goiano	Goiânia	Terezópolis de Goiás
Centro Goiano	Goiânia	Trindade
Centro Goiano	Iporá	Amorinópolis
Centro Goiano	Iporá	Cachoeira de Goiás
Centro Goiano	Iporá	Córrego do Ouro
Centro Goiano	Iporá	Fazenda Nova
Centro Goiano	Iporá	Iporá
Centro Goiano	Iporá	Israelândia
Centro Goiano	Iporá	Ivolândia
Centro Goiano	Iporá	Jaupaci
Centro Goiano	Iporá	Moiporá
Centro Goiano	Iporá	Novo Brasil
Leste Goiano	Entorno de Brasília	Abadiânia
Leste Goiano	Entorno de Brasília	Água Fria de Goiás
Leste Goiano	Entorno de Brasília	Águas Lindas de Goiás
Leste Goiano	Entorno de Brasília	Alexânia
Leste Goiano	Entorno de Brasília	Cabeceiras
Leste Goiano	Entorno de Brasília	Cidade Ocidental
Leste Goiano	Entorno de Brasília	Cocalzinho de Goiás
Leste Goiano	Entorno de Brasília	Corumbá de Goiás
Leste Goiano	Entorno de Brasília	Cristalina
Leste Goiano	Entorno de Brasília	Formosa
Leste Goiano	Entorno de Brasília	Luziânia
Leste Goiano	Entorno de Brasília	Mimoso de Goiás
Leste Goiano	Entorno de Brasília	Novo Gama
Leste Goiano	Entorno de Brasília	Padre Bernardo
Leste Goiano	Entorno de Brasília	Pirenópolis
Leste Goiano	Entorno de Brasília	Planaltina
Leste Goiano	Entorno de Brasília	Santo Antônio do Descoberto
Leste Goiano	Entorno de Brasília	Valparaíso de Goiás
Leste Goiano	Entorno de Brasília	Vila Boa
Leste Goiano	Entorno de Brasília	Vila Propício
Leste Goiano	Vão do Paranã	Alvorada do Norte
Leste Goiano	Vão do Paranã	Buritinópolis
Leste Goiano	Vão do Paranã	Damianópolis
Leste Goiano	Vão do Paranã	Divinópolis de Goiás
Leste Goiano	Vão do Paranã	Flores de Goiás
Leste Goiano	Vão do Paranã	Guarani de Goiás
Leste Goiano	Vão do Paranã	Iaciara
Leste Goiano	Vão do Paranã	Mambaí
Leste Goiano	Vão do Paranã	Posse
Leste Goiano	Vão do Paranã	São Domingos
Leste Goiano	Vão do Paranã	Simolândia
Leste Goiano	Vão do Paranã	Sítio d'Abadia
Noroeste Goiano	Aragarças	Aragarças
Noroeste Goiano	Aragarças	Arenópolis
Noroeste Goiano	Aragarças	Baliza
Noroeste Goiano	Aragarças	Bom Jardim de Goiás
Noroeste Goiano	Aragarças	Diorama
Noroeste Goiano	Aragarças	Montes Claros de Goiás
Noroeste Goiano	Aragarças	Piranhas, Goiás
Noroeste Goiano	Rio Vermelho	Araguapaz
Noroeste Goiano	Rio Vermelho	Aruanã
Noroeste Goiano	Rio Vermelho	Britânia
Noroeste Goiano	Rio Vermelho	Faina
Noroeste Goiano	Rio Vermelho	Goiás
Noroeste Goiano	Rio Vermelho	Itapirapuã
Noroeste Goiano	Rio Vermelho	Jussara
Noroeste Goiano	Rio Vermelho	Matrinchã
Noroeste Goiano	Rio Vermelho	Santa Fé de Goiás
Noroeste Goiano	São Miguel do Araguaia	Crixás
Noroeste Goiano	São Miguel do Araguaia	Mozarlândia
Noroeste Goiano	São Miguel do Araguaia	Mundo Novo
Noroeste Goiano	São Miguel do Araguaia	Nova Crixás
Noroeste Goiano	São Miguel do Araguaia	Novo Planalto
Noroeste Goiano	São Miguel do Araguaia	São Miguel do Araguaia
Noroeste Goiano	São Miguel do Araguaia	Uirapuru
Norte Goiano	Chapada dos Veadeiros	Alto Paraíso de Goiás
Norte Goiano	Chapada dos Veadeiros	Campos Belos
Norte Goiano	Chapada dos Veadeiros	Cavalcante
Norte Goiano	Chapada dos Veadeiros	Colinas do Sul
Norte Goiano	Chapada dos Veadeiros	Monte Alegre de Goiás
Norte Goiano	Chapada dos Veadeiros	Nova Roma
Norte Goiano	Chapada dos Veadeiros	São João d'Aliança
Norte Goiano	Chapada dos Veadeiros	Teresina de Goiás
Norte Goiano	Porangatu	Alto Horizonte
Norte Goiano	Porangatu	Amaralina
Norte Goiano	Porangatu	Bonópolis
Norte Goiano	Porangatu	Campinaçu
Norte Goiano	Porangatu	Campinorte
Norte Goiano	Porangatu	Campos Verdes
Norte Goiano	Porangatu	Estrela do Norte
Norte Goiano	Porangatu	Formoso
Norte Goiano	Porangatu	Mara Rosa
Norte Goiano	Porangatu	Minaçu
Norte Goiano	Porangatu	Montividiu do Norte
Norte Goiano	Porangatu	Mutunópolis
Norte Goiano	Porangatu	Niquelândia
Norte Goiano	Porangatu	Nova Iguaçu de Goiás
Norte Goiano	Porangatu	Porangatu
Norte Goiano	Porangatu	Santa Tereza de Goiás
Norte Goiano	Porangatu	Santa Terezinha de Goiás
Norte Goiano	Porangatu	Trombas
Norte Goiano	Porangatu	Uruaçu
Sul Goiano	Catalão	Anhanguera
Sul Goiano	Catalão	Campo Alegre de Goiás
Sul Goiano	Catalão	Catalão
Sul Goiano	Catalão	Corumbaíba
Sul Goiano	Catalão	Cumari
Sul Goiano	Catalão	Davinópolis
Sul Goiano	Catalão	Goiandira
Sul Goiano	Catalão	Ipameri
Sul Goiano	Catalão	Nova Aurora
Sul Goiano	Catalão	Ouvidor
Sul Goiano	Catalão	Três Ranchos
Sul Goiano	Meia Ponte	Água Limpa
Sul Goiano	Meia Ponte	Aloândia
Sul Goiano	Meia Ponte	Bom Jesus de Goiás
Sul Goiano	Meia Ponte	Buriti Alegre
Sul Goiano	Meia Ponte	Cachoeira Dourada
Sul Goiano	Meia Ponte	Caldas Novas
Sul Goiano	Meia Ponte	Cromínia
Sul Goiano	Meia Ponte	Goiatuba
Sul Goiano	Meia Ponte	Inaciolândia
Sul Goiano	Meia Ponte	Itumbiara
Sul Goiano	Meia Ponte	Joviânia
Sul Goiano	Meia Ponte	Mairipotaba
Sul Goiano	Meia Ponte	Marzagão
Sul Goiano	Meia Ponte	Morrinhos
Sul Goiano	Meia Ponte	Panamá
Sul Goiano	Meia Ponte	Piracanjuba
Sul Goiano	Meia Ponte	Pontalina
Sul Goiano	Meia Ponte	Porteirão
Sul Goiano	Meia Ponte	Professor Jamil
Sul Goiano	Meia Ponte	Rio Quente
Sul Goiano	Meia Ponte	Vicentinópolis
Sul Goiano	Pires do Rio	Cristianópolis
Sul Goiano	Pires do Rio	Gameleira de Goiás
Sul Goiano	Pires do Rio	Orizona
Sul Goiano	Pires do Rio	Palmelo
Sul Goiano	Pires do Rio	Pires do Rio
Sul Goiano	Pires do Rio	Santa Cruz de Goiás
Sul Goiano	Pires do Rio	São Miguel do Passa Quatro
Sul Goiano	Pires do Rio	Silvânia
Sul Goiano	Pires do Rio	Urutaí
Sul Goiano	Pires do Rio	Vianópolis
Sul Goiano	Quirinópolis	Cachoeira Alta
Sul Goiano	Quirinópolis	Caçu
Sul Goiano	Quirinópolis	Gouvelândia
Sul Goiano	Quirinópolis	Itajá
Sul Goiano	Quirinópolis	Itarumã
Sul Goiano	Quirinópolis	Lagoa Santa
Sul Goiano	Quirinópolis	Paranaiguara
Sul Goiano	Quirinópolis	Quirinópolis
Sul Goiano	Quirinópolis	São Simão
Sul Goiano	Sudoeste de Goias	Aparecida do Rio Doce
Sul Goiano	Sudoeste de Goias	Aporé
Sul Goiano	Sudoeste de Goias	Caiapônia
Sul Goiano	Sudoeste de Goias	Castelândia
Sul Goiano	Sudoeste de Goias	Chapadão do Céu
Sul Goiano	Sudoeste de Goias	Doverlândia
Sul Goiano	Sudoeste de Goias	Jataí
Sul Goiano	Sudoeste de Goias	Maurilândia
Sul Goiano	Sudoeste de Goias	Mineiros
Sul Goiano	Sudoeste de Goias	Montividiu
Sul Goiano	Sudoeste de Goias	Palestina de Goiás
Sul Goiano	Sudoeste de Goias	Perolândia
Sul Goiano	Sudoeste de Goias	Portelândia
Sul Goiano	Sudoeste de Goias	Rio Verde
Sul Goiano	Sudoeste de Goias	Santa Helena de Goiás
Sul Goiano	Sudoeste de Goias	Santa Rita do Araguaia
Sul Goiano	Sudoeste de Goias	Santo Antônio da Barra
Sul Goiano	Sudoeste de Goias	Serranópolis
Sul Goiano	Vale do Rio dos Bois	Acreúna
Sul Goiano	Vale do Rio dos Bois	Campestre de Goiás
Sul Goiano	Vale do Rio dos Bois	Cezarina
Sul Goiano	Vale do Rio dos Bois	Edealina
Sul Goiano	Vale do Rio dos Bois	Edéia
Sul Goiano	Vale do Rio dos Bois	Indiara
Sul Goiano	Vale do Rio dos Bois	Jandaia
Sul Goiano	Vale do Rio dos Bois	Palmeiras de Goiás
Sul Goiano	Vale do Rio dos Bois	Palminópolis
Sul Goiano	Vale do Rio dos Bois	Paraúna
Sul Goiano	Vale do Rio dos Bois	São João da Paraúna
Sul Goiano	Vale do Rio dos Bois	Turvelândia
Sul Goiano	Vale do Rio dos Bois	Varjão

== Ordered by population ==
List of municipalities in Goiás by population, in descending order, based on estimates from IBGE for 1 July 2005.

=== More than 500,000 inhabitants ===
	Municipality	Population (IBGE Jul/2007)
1	Goiânia	1,244,645

=== More than 100,000 inhabitants ===
	Municipality	Population (IBGE Jul/2007)
2	Aparecida de Goiânia	475,303
3	Anápolis	325,544
4	Luziânia	196,046
5	Rio Verde	149,382
6	Águas Lindas de Goiás	131,884
7	Valparaíso de Goiás	114,450

=== More than 50,000 inhabitants ===
	Municipality	Population (IBGE 2007)
8	Trindade	97,491
9	Formosa	90,212
10	Itumbiara	88,109
11	Novo Gama	83,599
12	Jataí	81,972
13	Planaltina	76,376
14	Catalão	75,623
15	Senador Canedo	70,599
16	Caldas Novas	62,204
17	Santo Antônio do Descoberto	55,621
18	Goianésia	53,86

=== More than 25,000 inhabitants ===
	Municipality	Population (IBGE 2007)
19	Cidade Ocidental	48,589
20	Mineiros	45,189
21	Inhumas	44,983
22	Porangatu	39,238
23	Morrinhos	38,997
24	Jaraguá	38,968
25	Niquelândia	38,517
26	Quirinópolis	38,064
27	Cristalina	36,614
28	Santa Helena de Goiás	35,027
29	Uruaçu	33,382
30	Goiatuba	31,225
31	Iporá	31,060
32	Minaçu	31,041
33	Itaberaí	30,609
34	Posse	28,850
35	São Luís de Montes Belos	26,784
36	Pires do Rio	26,657

=== More than 10,000 inhabitants ===
	Municipality	Population (IBGE Jul/2005)
37	Itapuranga	24,832
38	Padre Bernardo	24,655
39	Goiás	24,472
41	Piracanjuba	24,252
42	Ipameri	23,777
43	Goianira	23,613
44	São Miguel do Araguaia	22,468
45	Alexânia	22,287
46	Nerópolis	22,081
47	Bela Vista de Goiás	21,611
48	Pirenópolis	21,241
49	Acreúna	20,959
50	Jussara	19,481
51	Anicuns	19,097
52	Ceres	19,026
53	Silvânia	19,022
54	Rubiataba	18,965
55	Palmeiras de Goiás	18,566
56	Campos Belos	18,489
57	Aragarças	18,378
58	Bom Jesus de Goiás	17,764
59	Cocalzinho de Goiás	17,299
60	Pontalina	17,257
61	Guapó	15,199
62	Caiapônia	15,148
63	São Simão	15,091
64	Hidrolândia	14,860
65	Itapaci	14,732
66	Uruana	14,051
67	Orizona	13,440
68	Indiara	13,052
69	Goianápolis	12,825
70	Abadiânia	12,736
71	Vianópolis	12,699
72	Itapirapuã	11,986
73	Piranhas	11,959
74	Mozarlândia	11,880
75	Crixás	11,818
76	Iaciara	11,758
77	Paraúna	11,462
78	Mara Rosa	11,406
79	Nova Crixás	11,035
80	Rialma	11,023
81	Edéia	10,990
82	Campinorte	10,508
83	Caçu	10,166
84	Petrolina de Goiás	10,155
85	Firminópolis	10,004
86	Maurilândia	10,001

=== More than 5,000 inhabitants ===
	Municipality	Population (IBGE Jul/2005)
87	Corumbá de Goiás	9,915
88	Cavalcante	9,773
89	Mundo Novo	9,759
90	Nova Glória	9,218
91	São Domingos	9,201
92	Santa Terezinha de Goiás	9,191
93	Montividiu	9,077
94	Flores de Goiás	9,045
95	Buriti Alegre	8,703
96	Cachoeira Alta	8,672
97	Paranaiguara	8,639
98	Cachoeira Dourada	8,539
99	Bom Jardim de Goiás	8,119
100	Itauçu	8,026
101	Leopoldo de Bulhões	8,010
102	São João d'Aliança	7,751
103	Montes Claros de Goiás	7,703
104	Alvorada do Norte	7,666
105	Sanclerlândia	7,641
106	Carmo do Rio Verde	7,608
107	Doverlândia	7,521
108	Aragoiânia	7,519
109	Alto Paraíso de Goiás	7,428
110	Corumbaíba	7,360
111	Nova Veneza	7,298
112	Araguapaz	7,271
113	Joviânia	7,205
114	Faina	7,053
115	Fazenda Nova	7,048
116	Cezarina	6,996
117	Cabeceiras	6,942
118	Nazário	6,873
119	Bonfinópolis	6,624
120	Simolândia	6,621
121	Vicentinópolis	6,503
122	Abadia de Goiás	6,294
123	Jandaia	6,259
124	Monte Alegre de Goiás	6,219
125	Terezópolis de Goiás	6,085
126	São Francisco de Goiás	6,044
127	Itajá	5,884
128	Britânia	5,651
129	Barro Alto	5,625
130	Santa Bárbara de Goiás	5,619
131	Serranópolis	5,565
132	Santa Rita do Araguaia	5,433
133	Inaciolândia	5,416
134	Mambaí	5,397
135	Divinópolis de Goiás	5,264
136	Formoso	5,233
137	Itaguaru	5,224
138	Aruanã	5,212
139	Campo Limpo de Goiás	5,188
140	Itarumã	5,187
141	Chapadão do Céu	5,100
142	Mossâmedes	5,044

=== Fewer than 5,000 inhabitants ===
	Municipality	Population (IBGE Jul/2005)
143	Americano do Brasil	4,978
144	Turvânia	4,977
145	Matrinchã	4,928
146	Vila Propício	4,923
147	Água Fria de Goiás	4,778
148	Goiandira	4,716
149	Ouvidor	4,627
150	Montividiu do Norte	4,620
151	Itaguari	4,573
152	Santo Antônio da Barra	4,544
153	Campo Alegre de Goiás	4,523
154	Caturaí	4,453
155	Santa Tereza de Goiás	4,443
156	Santa Fé de Goiás	4,434
157	Ouro Verde de Goiás	4,420
158	Rianápolis	4,410
159	Araçu	4,400
160	Castelândia	4,364
161	Hidrolina	4,278
162	Aurilândia	4,216
163	Turvelândia	4,205
164	São Luíz do Norte	4,160
165	Portelândia	4,119
166	Guarani de Goiás	4,093
167	Amorinópolis	3,968
168	Gouvelândia	3,929
169	Arenópolis	3,906
170	São Miguel do Passa Quatro	3,895
171	Mutunópolis	3,892
172	Colinas do Sul	3,855
173	Cromínia	3,823
174	Santo Antônio de Goiás	3,806
175	Novo Brasil	3,794
176	Professor Jamil	3,765
177	Heitoraí	3,711
178	Campestre de Goiás	3,700
179	Edealina	3,655
180	Perolândia	3,639
181	Santa Cruz de Goiás	3,601
182	Buritinópolis	3,590
183	Varjão	3,579
184	Vila Boa	3,567
185	Palminópolis	3,518
186	Aporé	3,500
187	Caldazinha	3,435
188	Santa Isabel	3,407
189	Estrela do Norte	3,405
190	Palestina de Goiás	3,390
191	Teresina de Goiás	3,344
192	Taquaral de Goiás	3,285
193	Santa Rosa de Goiás	3,276
194	Urutaí	3,273
195	Cristianópolis	3,263
196	Cumari	3,244
197	Campinaçu	3,221
198	Três Ranchos	3,189
199	Jaupaci	3,154
200	Santa Rita do Novo Destino	3,131
201	Amaralina	3,115
202	Nova Roma	3,092
203	Uirapuru	3,081
204	Damianópolis	3,070
205	Trombas	3,061
206	Brazabrantes	3,046
207	Buriti de Goiás	3,038
208	Ivolândia	2,978
209	Porteirão	2,959
210	Panamá	2,948
211	Rio Quente	2,886
212	Guaraíta	2,835
213	Novo Planalto	2,829
214	Alto Horizonte	2,825
215	Israelândia	2,783
216	Gameleira de Goiás	2,782
217	Córrego do Ouro	2,775
218	Ipiranga de Goiás	2,766
219	Aparecida do Rio Doce	2,727
220	Campos Verdes	2,675
221	Sítio d'Abadia	2,639
222	Avelinópolis	2,614
223	Bonópolis	2,576
224	Damolândia	2,560
225	Adelândia	2,536
226	Morro Agudo de Goiás	2,466
227	Palmelo	2,426
228	Diorama	2,411
229	Pilar de Goiás	2,395
230	Nova Iguaçu de Goiás	2,369
231	Água Limpa	2,365
232	Guarinos	2,301
233	Nova América	2,287
234	Marzagão	2,243
235	Mairipotaba	2,239
236	Aloândia	2,213
237	Mimoso de Goiás	2,206
238	Jesúpolis	2,141
239	São João da Paraúna	2,115
240	Davinópolis	2,030
241	Nova Aurora	1,978
242	Moiporá	1,878
243	São Patrício	1,845
244	Cachoeira de Goiás	1,537
245	Baliza	1,106
246	Lagoa Santa	958
247	Anhanguera	911

== Ordered by area and population ==
This is a list of municipalities in the state of Goiás, Brazil. Population figures are estimates from 2005. Area figures are from 2002.

City	Population	Area (km^{2})
Abadia de Goiás	6,294	146.4
Abadiânia	12,736	1,047.0
Acreúna	20,959	1,571.1
Adelândia	2,536	115.7
Água Fria de Goiás	4,778	2,036.7
Águas Lindas de Goiás	159,294	278.0
Alexânia	22,287	850.8
Aloândia	2,213	102.5
Alto Horizonte	2,825	505.6
Alto Paraíso de Goiás	7,428	2,603.4
Alvorada do Norte	7,666	1,296.6
Amaralina	3,115	1,418.1
Americano do Brasil	4,978	134,0
Amorinópolis	3,968	409.9
Anápolis	313,412	918.3
Anhanguera	911	55.0
Anicuns	19,097	1,750.0
Aparecida de Goiânia	435,323	290.1
Aparecida do Rio Doce	2,727	290.0
Aporé	3,500	2,909.0
Araçu	4,400	154,0
Aragarças	18,378	660.6
Aragoiânia	7,519	219.5
Araguapaz	7,271	2,127.0
Arenópolis	3,906	1,078.3
Aruanã	5,212	3,180.0
Aurilândia	4,216	567.0
Avelinópolis	2,614	164.6
Baliza	1,106	567.0
Barro Alto	5,625	1,231.8
Bela Vista de Goiás	21,611	1,280.9
Bom Jardim de Goiás	8,119	1,557.0
Bom Jesus de Goiás	17,764	1,409.0
Bonfinópolis	6,624	122.2
Bonópolis	2,576	1,634.5
Brazabrantes	1,876	124.0
Britânia	5,651	1,562.0
Buriti Alegre	8,703	945.0
Buriti de Goiás	3,038	200.0
Buritinópolis	3,590	269.1
Cabeceiras	6,942	1,117.4
Cachoeira Alta	8,672	1,659.4
Cachoeira de Goiás	1,537	417.1
Cachoeira Dourada	8,539	732.0
Caçu	10,166	2,257.8
Caiapônia	15,148	8,682.0
Caldas Novas	65,637	1,588.0
Caldazinha	3,435	312.0
Campestre de Goiás	3,700	274.7
Campinaçu	3,221	1,981.7
Campinorte	10,508	1,068.0
Campo Alegre de Goiás	4,523	2,459.0
Campo Limpo de Goiás	5,188	156.0
Campos Belos	18,489	786.0
Campos Verdes	2,675	443.0
Carmo do Rio Verde	7,608	457.5
Castelândia	4,364	298.4
Catalão	70,574	3,789.5
Caturaí	4,453	206.0
Cavalcante	9,773	6,979.5
Ceres	19,026	456.6
Cezarina	6,996	417.2
Chapadão do Céu	5,100	2,190.0
Cidade Ocidental	47,499	389.8
Cocalzinho de Goiás	17,299	1,794.0
Colinas do Sul	3,855	1,714.5
Córrego do Ouro	2,755	463.9
Corumbá de Goiás	9,915	1,736.0
Corumbaíba	7,360	1,875.0
Cristalina	39,867	6,188.7
Cristianópolis	3,263	226.1
Crixás	2,755	4,661.5
Cromínia	3,823	371.1
Cumari	3,244	577.0
Damianópolis	3,070	416.9
Damolândia	2,560	84.9
Davinópolis	2,030	521.8
Diorama	2,411	689.6
Divinópolis de Goiás	5,264	834.3
Doverlândia	3,655	3,218.2
Edealina	7,521	606.6
Edéia	10,990	1,466.3
Estrela do Norte	3,405	302.7
Faina	7,053	1,951.8
Fazenda Nova	7,048	1,285.7
Firminópolis	10,004	407.5
Flores de Goiás	9,045	3,722.8
Formosa	90,247	5,806.8
Formoso	5,233	847.4
Gameleira de Goiás	2,782	595.0
Goianápolis	12,825	162.38
Goiandira	4,716	560.7
Goianésia	52,684	1,547.6
Goiânia	1,201,006	739.5
Goianira	23,613	577.0
Goiás	26,705	3,108.0
Goiatuba	31,924	2,475.1
Gouvelândia	3,929	830.7
Guapó	15,199	517.0
Guaraíta	2,835	205.3
Guarani de Goiás	4,093	1,229.1
Guarinos	2,301	595.8
Heitoraí	3,711	229.6
Hidrolândia	14,860	944.2
Hidrolina	4,278	580.4
Iaciara	11,758	1,625.2
Inaciolândia	5,416	688.3
Indiara	13,052	956.4
Inhumas	47,361	613.3
Ipameri	23,777	4,368.6
Ipiranga de Goiás	2,766	241.4
Iporá	32,310	1,026.4
Israelândia	2,783	577.4
Itaberaí	29,775	1,471.1
Itaguari	4,573	135.5
Itaguaru	5,224	239.9
Itajá	5,884	2,091.3
Itapaci	14,732	956.1
Itapirapuã	11,986	2,043.7
Itapuranga	25,646	1,277.2
Itarumã	5,187	3,433.6
Itauçu	8,026	383.7

City	Population	Area (km^{2})
Itumbiara	85,724	2,461.3
Ivolândia	2,978	1,262.8
Jandaia	6,259	864.1
Jaraguá	36,479	1,888.9
Jataí	83,479	7,174.2
Jaupaci	3,154	527.2
Jesúpolis	2,141	120.9
Joviânia	7,205	454.9
Jussara	19,481	4,092.4
Lagoa Santa	958	750.0
Leopoldo de Bulhões	8,010	495.0
Luziânia	180,227	3,961.0
Mambaí	5,397	859.5
Mara Rosa	11,406	1,703.9
Marzagão	2,243	228.0
Matrinchã	4,928	1,150.8
Mimoso de Goiás	2,206	1,386.9
Minaçu	34,435	2,860.7
Mineiros	43,961	8,896.3
Moiporá	1,878	460.6
Monte Alegre de Goiás	6,219	3,119.8
Montes Claros de Goiás	7,703	2,899.2
Montividiu	9,077	1,874.6
Montividiu do Norte	4,620	1,332.9
Morrinhos	39,745	2,846.2
Morro Agudo de Goiás	2,466	282.6
Mossâmedes	5,044	584.4
Mozarlândia	11,880	1,734.3
Mundo Novo	9,759	2,146.6
Mutunópolis	3,892	869.0
Nazário	6,873	300.1
Nerópolis	22,081	204.2
Niquelândia	22,081	9,843.0
Nova América	2,287	212,0
Nova Aurora	1,978	302,6
Nova Crixás	11,035	7,298.7
Nova Glória	9,218	412,9
Nova Iguaçu de Goiás	2,601	630.7
Nova Roma	3,092	2,135.9
Nova Veneza	7,928	123.3
Novo Brasil	3,794	649.9
Novo Gama	93,081	191.6
Novo Planalto	2,829	1,242.6
Orizona	13,440	1,972.8
Ouro Verde de Goiás	4,627	209.6
Ouvidor	4,627	413.7
Padre Bernardo	24,655	3,137.9
Palestina de Goiás	18,566	1,320.6
Palmeiras de Goiás	18,566	1,539.6
Palmelo	3,518	58.9
Palminópolis	2,426	387.6
Panamá	2,948	433.7
Paranaiguara	8,639	1,153.7
Paraúna	11,462	3,781.2
Perolândia	3,639	1,029.6
Petrolina de Goiás	10,155	540.4
Pilar de Goiás	2,395	906.6
Piracanjuba	24,252	2,405.1
Piranhas	11,959	2,047.7
Pirenópolis	21,241	2,227.7
Pires do Rio	26,229	1,076.7
Planaltina	94,717	2,539.1
Pontalina	17,257	1,428.1
Porangatu	40,307	4,820.4
Porteirão	2,959	603.9
Portelândia	4,119	550.6
Posse	27,591	1,949.6
Professor Jamil	3,765	347.4
Quirinópolis	37,913	3,780.
Rialma	11,023	268.9
Rianápolis	4,410	159.3
Rio Quente	2,886	256.7
Rio Verde	130,211	8,415.4
Rubiataba	18,083	2,879.0
Sanclerlândia	7,641	496.8
Santa Bárbara de Goiás	5,619	140.1
Santa Cruz de Goiás	3,601	1,108.9
Santa Fé de Goiás	4,434	1,160.8
Santa Helena de Goiás	35,424	1,127.8
Santa Isabel	3,407	806.8
Santa Rita do Araguaia	5,433	1,361.7
Santa Rita do Novo Destino	3,131	956.0
Santa Rosa de Goiás	3,276	170.9
Santa Tereza de Goiás	4,443	794.5
Santa Terezinha de Goiás	9,191	1,202.2
Santo Antônio da Barra	4,544	451.6
Santo Antônio de Goiás	3,806	132.8
Santo Antônio do Descoberto	74,867	938.3
São Domingos	9,201	3,295.5
São Francisco de Goiás	6,044	339.3
São João d'Aliança	7,751	3,327.3
São João da Paraúna	2,115	305.3
São Luís de Montes Belos	27,225	826.2
São Luíz do Norte	4,160	586.0
São Miguel do Araguaia	25,063	6,144.4
São Miguel do Passa Quatro	3,895	537.8
São Patrício	1,845	134.5
São Simão	15,091	414.0
Senador Canedo	71,399	244.7
Serranópolis	5,565	5,526.5
Silvânia	19,022	2,264.7
Simolândia	6,621	347.8
Sítio d'Abadia	2,639	1,598.3
Taquaral de Goiás	3,285	201.4
Teresina de Goiás	3,344	774.6
Terezópolis de Goiás	6,085	106.9
Três Ranchos	2,560	3,189.0
Trindade	99,235	713.3
Trombas	3,061	799.1
Turvânia	4,977	472.3
Turvelândia	4,205	934.2
Uirapuru	3,081	1,153.4
Uruaçu	33,280	2,141.8
Uruana	14,051	522.1
Urutaí	3,273	626.7
Valparaíso de Goiás	119,493	60.1
Varjão	3,579	519.0
Vianópolis	12,699	953.3
Vicentinópolis	6,503	737.2
Vila Boa	3,567	1,060.2
Vila Propício	4,923	2,181.5
State of Goiás	5,619,917	340,086.698

Largest in area	Niquelândia	9,843.0 km^{2} (3,800.4 sq mi)
Smallest in area	Palmelo	58.9 km^{2} (22.7 sq mi)
Highest in elevation	Alto Paraíso de Goiás	1,183 metres (3,881 ft)
Most densely populated	Goiânia	1,624.1 inhabitants/km^{2} (2005)
Most sparsely populated	Serranópolis	1.01 inhabitants/km^{2} (2005)
Highest ranking on Human Development Index	Chapadão do Céu	Score of .834

== See also ==
- Geography of Brazil
- List of cities in Brazil
