= Joviânia =

- Municipality
- Location in Goiás state

- Location in Brazil
- Coordinates: 17°48′33″S 49°37′00″W
- Country: Brazil
- Region: Central-West
- State: Goiás
- Microregion: Meia Ponte Microregion

Area
  - Total: 454.9 km^{2} (175.6 sq mi)
- Elevation: 807 m (2,648 ft)

Population (2020)
  - Total: 7,402
  - Density: 16.27/km^{2} (42.14/sq mi)
- Time zone: UTC−3 (BRT)
- Postal code: 75610-000

Joviânia is a municipality in south-central Goiás state, Brazil. The population was 7,402 (2020 IBGE) in a total area of 454.9 km^{2}.

== Location ==
Joviânia is 177 kilometers from the state capital, Goiânia. It is located approximately halfway between Rio Verde and Morrinhos. Highway connections with Goiânia are made by GO-040 / Aragoiânia / Cromínia / Pontalina / Aloândia / GO-320. See Sepin for the list of distances in Goiás

The vegetation is typical cerrado with trees with twisted branches and thick bark. The soil is rich in basalt and other unexplored minerals.

The climate is mild with average annual temperatures of around 23 °C.

== Tourism ==
Most of the natural tourist spots are on private property. There are several waterfalls, rivers, and a vast flora and fauna.

== History ==
The origin of the town is related to the devotion that a rancher, Antônio Miguel da Costa, had for the Catholic representation of the Virgin, Nossa Senhora Abadia. The pioneer donated lands in the name of the "saint" with the intention of starting a town near Goiatuba and about 170 kilometers from Goiânia. In 1942 the town of Bela Vista was formed. Joviânia became a district of Goiatuba with the name "Joviânia" in 1953, the name being chosen in homage to Joviano Ferreira Barbosa, one of the first founders. In 1958 it became a municipality.

== Political Data ==
- Mayor: Romeu José Gonçalves (January 2005)
- Vice-mayor: Juscelino Fernandes da Silva
- Number of council members: 9
- Number of eligible voters: 5,510 (2007)

== Demographics ==
- Population density: 14.80 inhabitants/km^{2} (2007)
- Urban and rural population in 2007: 6,086 and 645
- Urban and rural population in 1980: 4,110 and 2,210
- Population in 1980: 6,320
- Population growth rate 1996/2007: 0.13%

== Economy ==
The economy is based on modest commerce, public employment, cattle raising, and agriculture. There was one dairy in 2005.

Economic Data (All economic data are from Sepin)

- Number of Industrial Establishments: 6 (June/2007)
- Dairies: Laticínios Terra Nova Ltda (07/06/2007)
- Banking Establishments: - Banco do Brasil S.A. - Banco Itaú S.A.
- Number of Retail Commercial Establishments: 107 (August/2007)
- Automobiles: 823
- Cattle (head) 38,285 (2006)
- Farms: 320 with 32,300 ha., of which 13,930 ha. were cultivated (2006)
- Pasture land: 12,291 ha.
- Woodland and forests: 5,939 ha.
- Workers in agriculture: 490
- Corn: 1,500 ha.
- Sorghum: 2,000 ha.
- Soybeans: 21,600 ha.
- Modest production of wheat and beans

== Education (2006) ==
There were 1,324 students in primary schools and 246 students in middle and secondary schools.

- Literacy Rate: 87.2%

== Health (2007) ==
- Hospitals: 1
- Beds: 12
- Walk-in health clinics: 1
- Infant mortality rate: 19.67 (in 1,000 live births)

Municipal Human Development Index

- MHDI: 0.786
- State ranking: 19 (out of 242 municipalities in 2000)
- National ranking: 897 (out of 5,507 municipalities in 2000)

For the complete list see Frigoletto.com

== See also ==
- List of municipalities in Goiás
- Meia Ponte Microregion
