= Fazenda Nova =

- Municipality
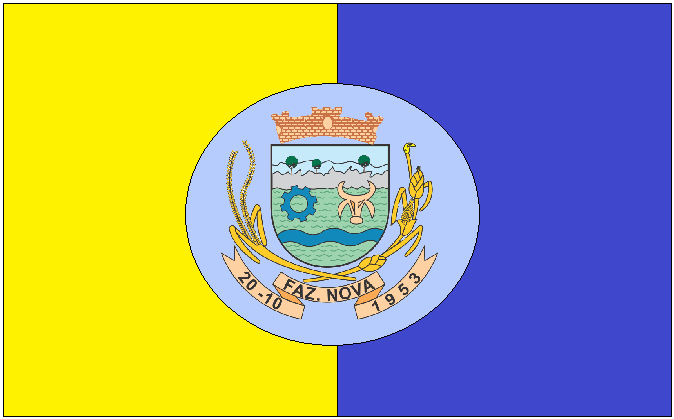
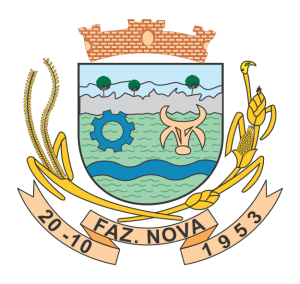
- Flag Coat of arms

- Location in Goiás state

- Location in Brazil
- Coordinates: 16°11′12″S 50°46′29″W
- Country: Brazil
- Region: Central-West
- State: Goiás
- Microregion: Iporá Microregion

Area
  - Total: 1,281.31 km^{2} (494.72 sq mi)
- Elevation: 476 m (1,562 ft)

Population (2020)
  - Total: 5,553
  - Density: 4.334/km^{2} (11.22/sq mi)
- Time zone: UTC−3 (BRT)
- Postal code: 76220-000

Fazenda Nova is a municipality in central-west Goiás state, Brazil.

== Location ==
Fazenda Nova is located northwest of the state capital, Goiânia, which is 206 km. away taking highways GO-418 and GO-060. Fazenda Nova belongs to the Iporá Microregion.

Municipal boundaries are with: Buriti de Goiás, Córrego do Ouro, Israelândia, Jaupaci, Jussara, Montes Claros de Goiás and Novo Brasil.

Districts, villages, and hamlets

- Districts: Bacilândia and Serra Dourada.
- Villages: Iapiruara e São Sebastião do Indaia.
- Hamlet: Três Marcos.

== Demographics ==
- Population in 1980: 9.887
- Population in 2007: 6.373
- Urban population: 4.257
- Rural population: 2.116
- Population growth rate: -1.50% 1996/2007

== The economy ==
The main economic activities were agriculture, cattle raising, and milk production. There was one banking institution—Banco do Brasil S.A (08/2007) and one dairy—Laticínios Morrinhos Ind. e Com. Ltda.; - Coop. Prod. de Leite da Regional de Fazenda Nova (2007). In 2006 there were 116,000 head of cattle. Agricultural production was modest with main crops being corn, soybeans, manioc, hearts of palm, and bananas.

- GDP (PIB) (R$1,000.00): 54,904 (2005)
- GDP per capita (R$1.00): 7,790 (2005)

Motor vehicles

- Automobiles: 414
- Pickup trucks: 90
- Number of inhabitants per motor vehicle: 13

Agricultural data 2006

- Farms: 873
- Total area: 116,273 ha.
- Area of permanent crops: 189 ha.
- Area of perennial crops: 1,379 ha.
- Area of natural pasture: 87,951 ha.
- Area of woodland and forests: 26,811 ha.
- Persons dependent on farming: 2,500
- Farms with tractors: 62
- Number of tractors: 78
- Cattle herd: 116,000 head

== Health and education ==
In 2000 the literacy rate was 84.1% while the infant mortality rate was 18.35 in 1,000 live births. There were 11 schools with 1,610 students in 2006, while there was one hospital with 28 beds in 2007. The Municipal Human Development Index was 0.746, which was ranked 89 in the state.

== History ==
The history of Fazenda Nova begins in 1945 on the Tres Ilhas cattle ranch owned by José de Paula Barbosa. The first settlement took the name of Paulápolis to honor its founder. Its rapid economic development made it pass from the category of "povoado" (village) directly to that of municipality in 1953.

== See also ==
- List of municipalities in Goiás
- Microregions of Goiás
