= São Patrício =

- Municipality
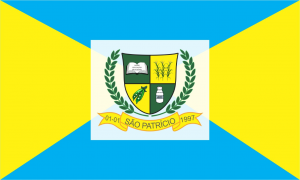
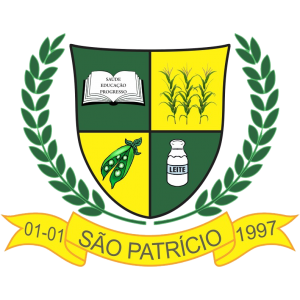
- Flag Coat of arms

- Location in Goiás state

- Location in Brazil
- Coordinates: 15°20′54″S 49°48′50″W
- Country: Brazil
- Region: Central-West
- State: Goiás
- Microregion: Ceres Microregion

Area
  - Total: 134.5 km^{2} (51.9 sq mi)
- Elevation: 560 m (1,840 ft)

Population (2020)
  - Total: 2,037
  - Density: 15.14/km^{2} (39.23/sq mi)
- Time zone: UTC−3 (BRT)
- Postal code: 76343-000

São Patrício is a municipality in the northwestern portion of the Brazilian state of Goiás.

== Location ==
São Patrício is located 42 km. west of Ceres. Highway connections from Goiânia: GO-070 / Goianira / Inhumas / GO-154 / Itaguaru / Uruana / Carmo do Rio Verde / GO-460. See Seplan

Neighboring municipalities are Morro Agudo de Goiás, Rubiataba, Carmo do Rio Verde, Itapuranga

== Demographics ==
- Population Density: 15.25/km² (2007)
- Urban population: 980
- Population growth rate: 1.60% 2000/2007

== The economy ==
The economy is based on subsistence agriculture, cattle raising (19,000 head in 2006), services, public administration, and small transformation industries. There was one dairy in 2007. There were 260 farms in 2006 with 12,385 hectares of cropland and pasture. The main crops were rice (250 hectares), sugarcane (2,000 hectares), beans, manioc, passion fruit, corn (600 hectares), and tomatoes.

== Health and education ==
There were 03 schools with 588 students (2006). The adult literacy rate was 84.0% (2000) (national average was 86.4%). In the health sector there were no hospitals. The infant mortality rate was 22.85 (2000) (national average was 33.0). The Municipal Human Development Index score was 0.728. For the complete list see frigoletto.com.br

== Temperatures ==
→ Winter temperatures: low: 14 °C/high: 32 °C;

→ Spring temperatures: low: 23 °C/high: 36 °C;

→ Summer temperatures: low: 22 °C/high: 29 °C;

→ Autumn temperatures: low: 17 °C/high: 29 °C.

== See also ==
- List of municipalities in Goiás
