= Novo Brasil =

- Municipality
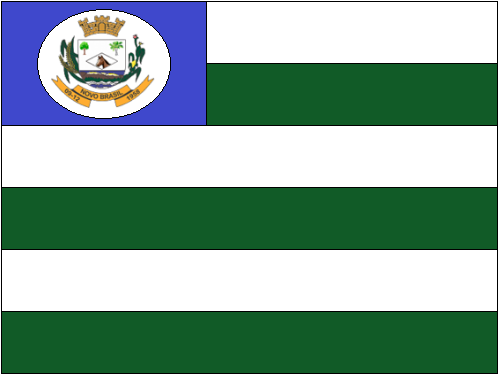
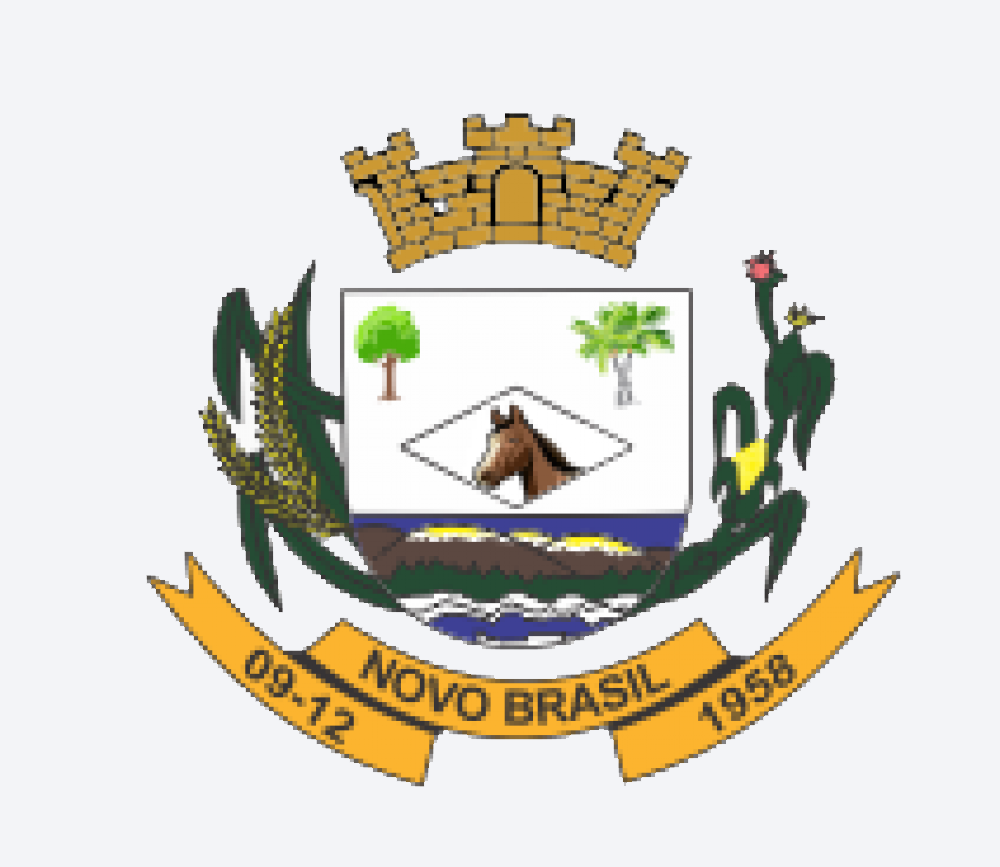
- Flag Coat of arms

- Location in Goiás state

- Location in Brazil
- Coordinates: 16°02′16″S 50°42′21″W
- Country: Brazil
- Region: Central-West
- State: Goiás
- Microregion: Iporá Microregion

Area
  - Total: 649.9 km^{2} (250.9 sq mi)
- Elevation: 400 m (1,300 ft)

Population (2020)
  - Total: 2,843
  - Density: 4.375/km^{2} (11.33/sq mi)
- Time zone: UTC−3 (BRT)
- Postal code: 76285-000

Novo Brasil is a municipality in eastern Goiás state, Brazil.

== Location ==
Novo Brasil is located east of the capital near Iporá and São Luís de Montes Belos.

- Distance to the state capital: 200 km.
- Distance to regional center, São Luís de Montes Belos: 77 km.
- Highway connections from Goiânia: state highway BR-069 west from Goiânia, through Trindade/ GO-326 / Anicuns / GO-222 / Choupana / GO-326 / Sanclerlândia / Buriti de Goiás.

Neighboring municipalities: Fazenda Nova, Córrego do Ouro, Jussara, and Itapirapuã

== Political Information ==
In January 2005 the Mayor was José Fabiano Alves de Castro. There were 9 city-council members and 3,215 eligible voters in 2007.

== Demographic Information ==
In 2007 the population density was 5.31 inhabitants/km^{2}. There were 2,208 inhabitants in the urban area and 1,243 in the rural area. The population has declined by about 1,200 inhabitants since 1980 when it was 4,966. From 2000 to 2007 the population fell 2.7%.

== Economic Information ==
The economy was based on services, agriculture, cattle raising, and government employment. In 2005 there were 4 industrial units and 36 retail units. There were no financial institutions. In 2007 there were 250 automobiles, 59 pickups and 410 motorcycles.

In 2006 there were 89,240 head of cattle, 27,615 head of poultry, and 4,850 head of swine. The main agricultural products were rice, bananas, manioc, and corn. None exceeded 500 hectares in planted area.

- GDP (PIB) (R$1,000.00): 21,711 (2005)
- GDP per capita (R$1.00): 5,722 (2005)

Agricultural data 2006

- Farms: 493
- Total area: 35,910 ha.
- Area of permanent crops: 888 ha.
- Area of perennial crops: 124 ha.
- Area of natural pasture: 26,527 ha.
- Area of woodland and forests: 7,206 ha.
- Persons dependent on farming: 1,000
- Farms with tractors: 34
- Number of tractors: 46
- Cattle herd: 92,000 head IBGE

== Health and education ==
In 2007 there was 1 hospital with 27 beds and 2 walk-in health clinics. In 2002 there were 4 doctors, 1 nurse, 1 dentist, and 7 auxiliary nurses. In 2000 the infant mortality rate was 35.47, higher than the national average of 33.0.

In 2006 the school system had 6 schools, 27 classrooms, 56 teachers, and 860 students. Of these, 199 were attending a middle school. In 2000 the adult literacy rate was 83.9%, below the national average of 86.4%. In 2000 there were 2,470 students so the number has dropped substantially.

- Municipal Human Development Index: 0.713
- State ranking: 193 (out of 442 municipalities)
- National ranking: 2,763 (out of 5,507 municipalities)

== History ==
The settlement of this region began in 1949 when a group of farmers from Paraná arrived and settled between the Bocaina and Carapuça rivers. In 1953 the town achieved some prosperity and became known as Novo Brasil. In 1958 it became a district of Fazenda Nova. In the same year it was dismembered and made a municipality.

== See also ==
- List of municipalities in Goiás
- Microregions of Goiás
