= Nova Veneza =

Nova Veneza may refer to the following towns in Brazil:

- Nova Veneza, Goiás
- Nova Veneza, Santa Catarina
