= Amorinópolis =

- Municipality
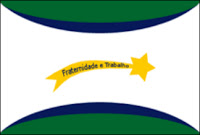
- Flag

- Location in Goiás state

- Location in Brazil
- Coordinates: 16°37′04″S 51°05′36″W
- Country: Brazil
- Region: Central-West
- State: Goiás
- Microregion: Iporá Microregion

Area
  - Total: 409.9 km^{2} (158.3 sq mi)
- Elevation: 641 m (2,103 ft)

Population (2020)
  - Total: 3,069
  - Density: 7.487/km^{2} (19.39/sq mi)
- Time zone: UTC−3 (BRT)
- Postal code: 76140-000

Amorinópolis is a municipality in eastern Goiás state, Brazil.

== Location ==
The distance to the regional center of (Iporá) is 19 km. Highway connections from Goiânia are made by state highway BR-069 west from Goiânia, through Trindade, São Luís de Montes Belos, Iporá, and then GO-174 for 19 kilometers south.

Neighboring municipalities: Iporá and Israelândia.

== The economy ==
The economy is based on cattle raising, agriculture, public service, and services. There were 61,000 head of cattle in 2006. The most important agricultural products in planted area were: rice, corn, and soybeans. There was 1 dairy: Vida Indústria de Laticínios Ltda. (22/05/2006).

Agricultural data 2006

- Farms: 295
- Total area: 39,707 ha.
- Area of permanent crops: not available
- Area of perennial crops: 415 ha.
- Area of natural pasture: 31,967 ha.
- Area of woodland and forests: 6,964 ha.
- Persons dependent on farming: 800
- Farms with tractors: 40
- Number of tractors: 44
- Cattle herd: 61,000 head

== Health and education ==
There were 6 schools (2006) and 1 hospital with 16 beds (2007).

- Infant mortality rate: 24.39 for every 1000 live births in 2000.
- Literacy rate: 83.3% in 2000.
- Ranking on the 2000 Municipal Human Development Index: 0.732

== History ==
The history of Amorinópolis is connected to the building of an airplane runway built in 1949 by Israel Amorim. Several families settled here including the Macedo brothers who opened the first general store. In 1953 the village became a district called Campo Limpo in the municipality of Iporá. In 1958 it got its municipal independence with the name Amorinópolis, in homage to its founder, Israel Amorim.

== See also ==
- List of municipalities in Goiás
