= Leopoldo de Bulhões =

- Municipality
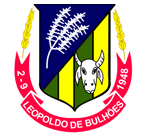
- Flag Coat of arms

- Location in Goiás state

- Location in Brazil
- Coordinates: 16°37′29″S 48°44′38″W
- Country: Brazil
- Region: Central-West
- State: Goiás
- Microregion: Goiânia Microregion

Area
  - Total: 495.0 km^{2} (191.1 sq mi)
- Elevation: 1,030 m (3,380 ft)

Population (2020)
  - Total: 9,123
  - Density: 18.43/km^{2} (47.73/sq mi)
- Time zone: UTC−3 (BRT)
- Postal code: 75190-000

Leopoldo de Bulhões is a municipality in central Goiás state, Brazil. The total area was 495.0 km^{2} (191.1 sq mi) in October 2002, and the population was 9,123 in 2024. The elevation is 1,030 meters (3,380 ft) above sea level, one of the highest in the state.

== Political division ==
The territory is made up of the following settlements: Capelinha, Goiavista, São Caetano, Trevo do José Rosário, Vila Nova and Engenheiro Valente. Neighboring municipalities are: Anápolis, Bonfinópolis, Caldazinha, Gameleira de Goiás, Goianápolis and Silvânia.

Located in the Goiânia Microregion—it is 56 km (35 mi) from the state capital and is connected by BR-457 / GO-010 / Bonfinópolis / GO-330.

== Political information ==
The current mayor is João Alecio Mendes. In January 2005, there were 9 councilmembers in the city government. There were 5,635 eligible voters in December 2007.

== Demographic information ==
The population density was 18.01 km^{2} (6.95 sq mi) in 2007. In 1980 the population was 8,336 with urban and rural inhabitants evenly divided. In 1991 the population had decreased to 7,376. From 2000 to 2007 the population increased 1.99%.

== Education and health ==
In the educational area there were 13 schools in activity, with 54 classrooms, 114 teachers, and a total of 2,158 students (2006). In the health area there was only one hospital, private, Hospital Vicente de Paula, with 29 beds. Besides the hospital there were eight walk-in health clinics. The literacy rate was 85.7 in 2000 and the infant mortality rate was 31.42 in the same year.

== Economy ==
According to government statistics the municipality had 06 industrial units in 2007. There were 41 retail units. There was one dairy, Agropecuária e Laticínios Lebon Indústria e Comércio Ltda, in 2006. There was one bank institution, Banco Itaú S.A, in 2007.

Livestock raising is important with a total of 40,250 cows in 2006, of which 8,800 were milk cows. The poultry industry is quite developed with 795,000 head being reported for 2006.

In agriculture the town produces sweet potatoes, tomatoes, soybeans, corn, bananas, manioc, beans, sugarcane, and sorghum. The largest crop in planted area was soybeans with 4,000 hectares planted in 2006.

There is an historic railway station.

== History ==
In 1931, this settlement was raised to the category of district of Silvânia with the name of Leopoldo de Bulhões. This name was given in tribute to José Leopoldo de Bulhões Jardim, a state politician who was important at the time. The town saw enormous progress between 1928 and 1939, with the arrival of the tracks of the Estrada de Ferro Goyaz. For a certain time the station of Leopoldo de Bulhões was the last station on the railroad line, making it a strong motive for migration to the area. The railway line no longer operates.

Human Development Index: 0.715

- State ranking: 188 (out of 242 municipalities)
- National ranking: 2,730 (out of 5,507 municipalities)

== See also ==
- List of municipalities in Goiás
