= Pontalina =

- Municipality
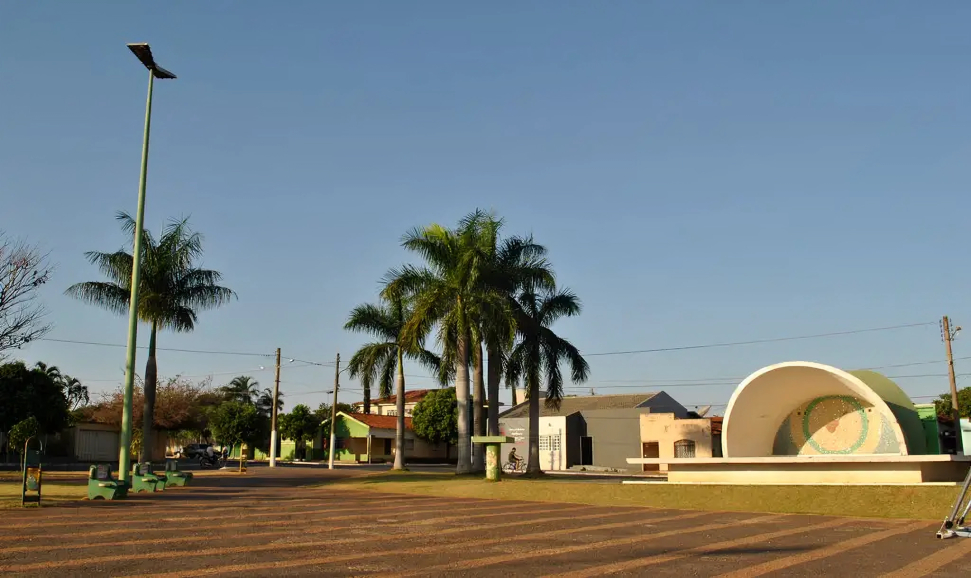

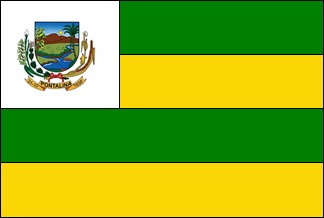
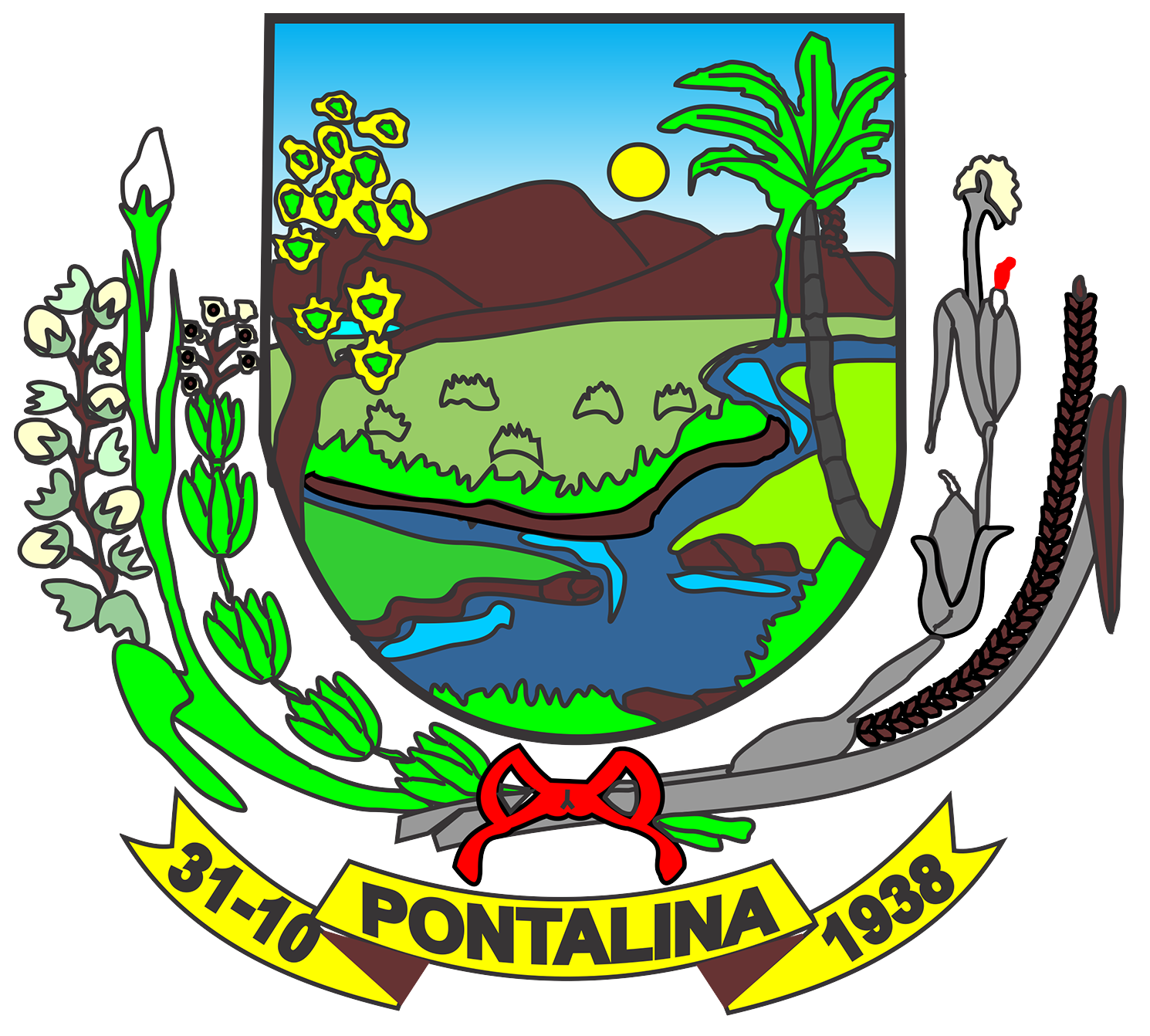
- Flag Coat of arms

- Location in Goiás state

- Location in Brazil
- Coordinates: 17°31′12″S 49°26′21″W
- Country: Brazil
- Region: Central-West
- State: Goiás
- Microregion: Meia Ponte Microregion

Area
  - Total: 1,428.2 km^{2} (551.4 sq mi)
- Elevation: 610 m (2,000 ft)

Population (2020)
  - Total: 17,860
  - Density: 12.51/km^{2} (32.39/sq mi)
- Time zone: UTC−3 (BRT)
- Postal code: 75620-000

Pontalina is a municipality in south-central Goiás state, Brazil. One hundred and twenty-five kilometers from the state capital, Goiânia, it has become one of the most important retail clusters of lingerie in the state: Every year thousand of people flock to the city to buy its production of fine lingerie in order to sell it within Goiás, in other states, and even abroad.

== Geography and climate ==
Pontalina is connected by highways BR-153 and GO-19. Another way to reach it by car is through the newly renovated GO-040 road that connects it to Aparecida de Goiânia (in the metropolitan area of the capital, Goiânia). Neighboring municipalities are Mairipotaba, Piracanjuba, Morrinhos, Aloândia, Joviânia, Vicentinópolis, Edéia, Edealina and Cezarina.

The climate is hot in summer and mild in winter, with an average annual temperature of 25 °C. The fauna is represented by jacaré, catitus, paca, deer, and capibara, whose preferred habitat is the Rio dos Bois. The flora has suffered with deforestation but there are still stands of jatobá, angico, aroeira, ipê and peroba rosa (Aspidosperma—see Peroba rosa)

== History ==
The origins of the town go back to the nineteenth century when cattle ranchers established themselves in the region. In 1938 what was once a district of Morrinhos became a city named Pontalina, derived from the proximity of the Rio dos Bois and the Meia Ponte River.

== Government ==
Pontalina's current mayor is Edson Guimaraes de Faria. In 2009 its city council had nine members.

== Demographics ==
As of 2007, its urban population numbered 13,216 people, its rural population, 3,010. Its population density was 11.36 inhabitants per square kilometer, and between 2000 and 2007 it experienced a population loss of 0.29 percent.

== Economy ==
Pontalina's economy is based on agriculture, cattle raising, services, public administration, and small transformation industries. There is a large production of milk.

- Industrial units: 40 (2007)
- Commercial units: 191 (2007)
- Bank agencies: Banco do Brasil - Banco Bradesco - Banco Itaú

(June 2007)

- Dairy: Parmalat Brasil - Indústria de Alimentos (22/05/2006)
- Cattle herd: 119,656 heads (2006)
- Dairy cows: 22,440 (2006)
- Main crops (2006): pumpkin, rice, banana, beans, watermelon, soybeans (16,850 hectares), tomatoes, wheat, and corn (1,150 hectares).

== Education ==
In 2006, Pontalina had 15 schools with a total enrollment of 4,283. There were 732 students in its middle and secondary schools. There is no higher education institution in the municipality, and its literacy rate among adults in 2000 was 86.2% (compared to the national average of 86.4%).

== Health ==
In 2007, the municipality had two hospitals and nine ambulatory clinics with a total 52 hospital beds.

Its infant mortality rate was 14.22 in 2000, compared to the national average of 33.0.

== Quality of life index ==
In the 2000 United Nations Human Development Index, Pontalina had a rating of 0.805, which ranked it in 8th place out of a total of 242 municipalities in the state of Goiás. Nationally it was ranked 467 out of 5,507 municipalities. For the complete list see Frigoletto

== See also ==
- List of municipalities in Goiás
