= Professor Jamil =

- Municipality
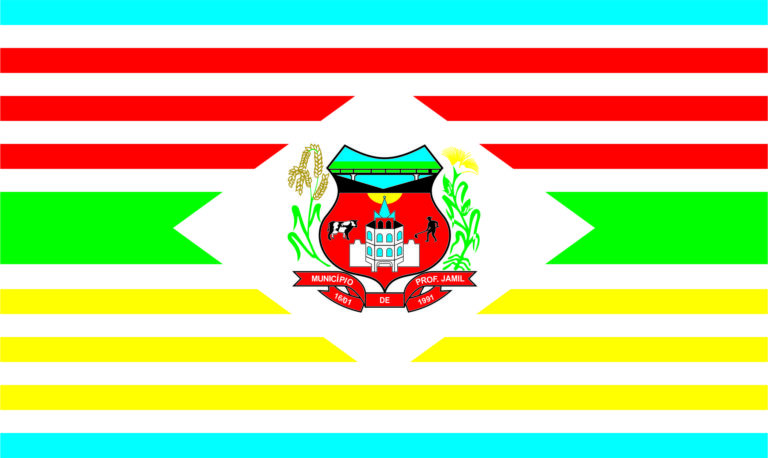
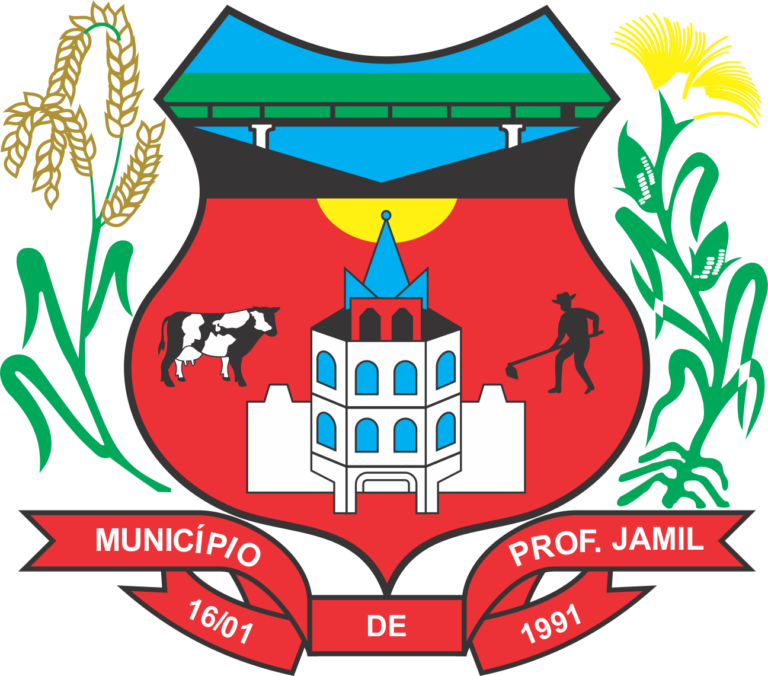
- Flag Coat of arms

- Location in Goiás state

- Location in Brazil
- Coordinates: 17°15′20″S 49°14′37″W
- Country: Brazil
- Region: Central-West
- State: Goiás
- Microregion: Meia Ponte Microregion

Area
  - Total: 347.4 km^{2} (134.1 sq mi)
- Elevation: 748 m (2,454 ft)

Population (2020)
  - Total: 3,203
  - Density: 9.220/km^{2} (23.88/sq mi)
- Time zone: UTC−3 (BRT)
- Postal code: 75603-000

Professor Jamil is a municipality in south-central Goiás state, Brazil. The population was 3,203 (2020) in a total area of 347.4 km^{2}.

== Geographical information ==
Located 66 kilometers south of the state capital, Goiânia, on BR-153, Professor Jamil has boundaries with the following municipalities:

- north: Hidrolândia;
- south: Mairipotaba and Piracanjuba;
- east: Piracanjuba;
- west: Cromínia and Mairipotaba

In road connections there are two state highways and several local roads linking the rural area to the town. The most important interstate highway of the state—BR153—crosses the municipality from north to south, connecting Professor Jamil to all the regions of Brazil.

== History ==
The origin of the town goes back to 1942 when a group of people got together and built a football field. Soon the first grocery store appeared. The first mass was prayed in 1952 when the settlement was called Campo Limpo. Soon it became a district of Piracanjuba and was emancipated in 1991 with the name, Professor Jamil, in homage to one of the first pioneers, Jamil Salim Safady, of Lebanese origin.

== Demographics ==
- Population density: 9.49 inhabitants/km^{2} (2007)
- Urban population: 2,342(2007)
- Rural population: 956 (2007)
- Population growth or loss: -0.45% from 2000/2007

== The Economy ==
The economy is based on agriculture, cattle raising, services, public administration, and small transformation industries. There is also a poultry industry, swine raising and extraction of sand.

- Industrial units: 0 (2007)
- Commercial units: 41 (2007)
- Bank agencies: none (June 2005)
- Dairies: - Indústria de Laticínios Boa Nova Ltda (22/05/2006)
- Cattle herd: 40,290 head (2006)
- Main crops (2006): rice and corn.
- Number of agricultural establishments: 299
- Area of agricultural establishments: 34,943 ha.
- Area of crops: 2,335 ha.
- Area of natural pasture: 28,310 ha.
- Persons working in agriculture: 835
- Farms with tractors. 54 IBGE

== Education (2006) ==
- Schools: 5 with 1,011 students
- Higher education: none
- Adult literacy rate: 83.7% (2000) (national average was 86.4%)

== Health (2007) ==
- Hospitals: 0
- Hospital beds: 0
- Ambulatory clinics: 1
- Infant mortality rate: 27.9 (2000) (national average was 33.0).

== Municipal Human Development Index ==
- MHDI: 0.736
- State ranking: 123 (out of 242 municipalities)
- National ranking: 2,229 (out of 5,507 municipalities) For the complete list see frigoletto.com.br

== See also ==
- List of municipalities in Goiás
