= Brazabrantes =

- Municipality
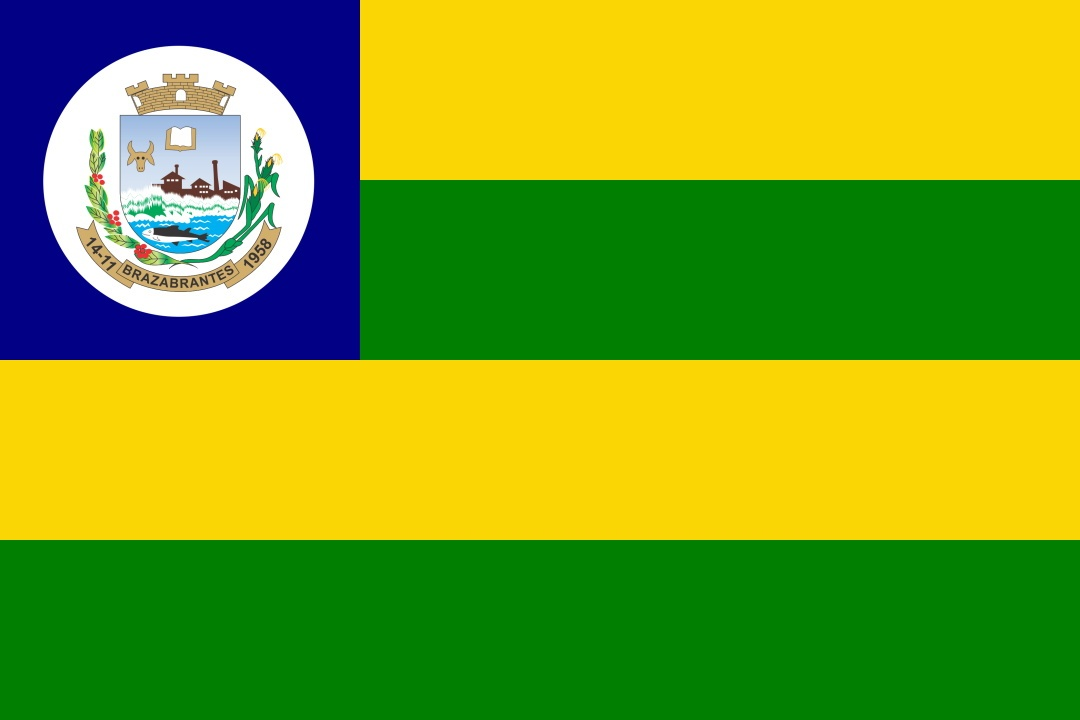
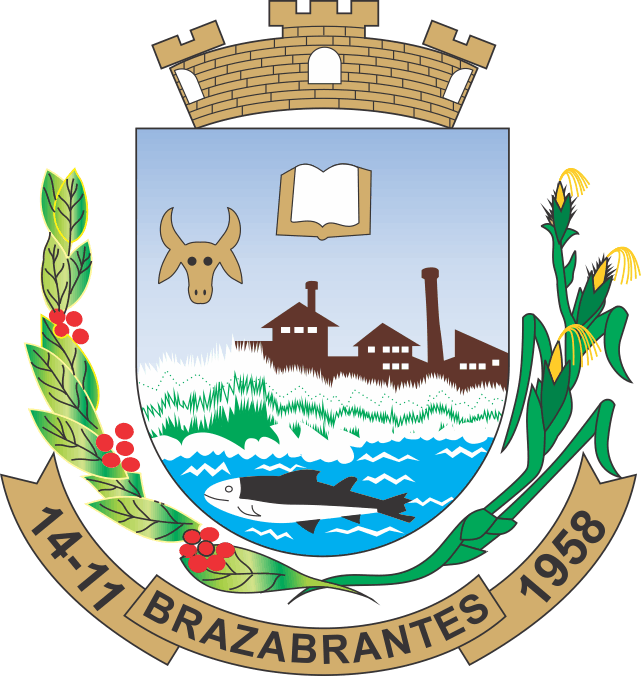
- Flag Coat of arms

- Location in Goiás state

- Location in Brazil
- Coordinates: 16°26′28″S 49°22′54″W
- Country: Brazil
- Region: Central-West
- State: Goiás
- Microregion: Anápolis Microregion

Area
  - Total: 124.0 km^{2} (47.9 sq mi)
- Elevation: 761 m (2,497 ft)

Population (2020)
  - Total: 3,746
  - Density: 30.21/km^{2} (78.24/sq mi)
- Time zone: UTC−3 (BRT)
- Postal code: 75440-000

Brazabrantes (Portuguese: [bɾazaˈbɾɐ̃tʃis]) is a municipality in central Goiás state, Brazil.

== Location ==
Brazabrantes is located 59 kilometers north of the important city of (Anápolis). Highway connections from the state capital of Goiânia are made by taking state highway GO-70 north to Goanira and then east to Brazabrantes.

Neighboring municipalities: Nova Veneza, Inhumas, Damolândia, and Goiânia. Brazabrantes is in the Meia Ponte River valley.

== Demographics ==
The population growth rate for the period 1996/2007 was 1.71%. The population in 1980 was 2,241, increasing to 3,142 in 2007.

== The economy ==
The economy is based on cattle raising (14,500 head in 2006), poultry raising and agriculture. The main agricultural products are small production of bananas, citrus fruits, tomatoes, manioc, rice, corn, soybeans, and beans; large production of sugarcane—1,500 hectares producing 118,000 tons. There were no banks in August 2007.

- Number of industrial establishments: 11 (June 2007)
- Number of retail commerce establishments: 24 (August 2007)

Agricultural data 2006

- Farms: 200
- Total area: 13,109 ha.
- Area of permanent crops: 137 ha.
- Area of perennial crops: 2,027 ha.
- Area of natural pasture: 9,541 ha.
- Area of woodland and forests: 963 ha.
- Persons dependent on farming: 400
- Farms with tractors: 30
- Number of tractors: 42
- Cattle herd: 14,500 head IBGE

== Health and education ==
- Infant mortality index: 15.11 (2000)
- Literacy rate: 86.2 (2000)
- Schools in activity: 5
- Classrooms: 21
- Teachers: 39
- Total number of students: 920

Brazabrantes had a score of 0.749 on the Municipal Human Development Index, ranking it 79 (out of 242 municipalities) in the state and 1,904 (out of 5,507 municipalities) in the country. All data are from 2000. For the complete list see frigoletto.com.br

== History ==
The settling of this town began around 1920 with the donation of land for the building of a chapel called Capela de São João Batista. The first houses were of adobe and palm fronds and the economy was based on agriculture and cattle raising. In 1943 it was raised to the category of district with the name São Joâo Batista do Meia Ponte, after the river with that name. Later the name was changed to Brazabrantes to honor the Brazilian general Braz Abrantes. In 1959 it achieved municipal status.

== Sources of Data ==
- Frigoletto
- Highway distances from Goiânia

== See also ==
- List of municipalities in Goiás
