= Itapuranga =

- Municipality
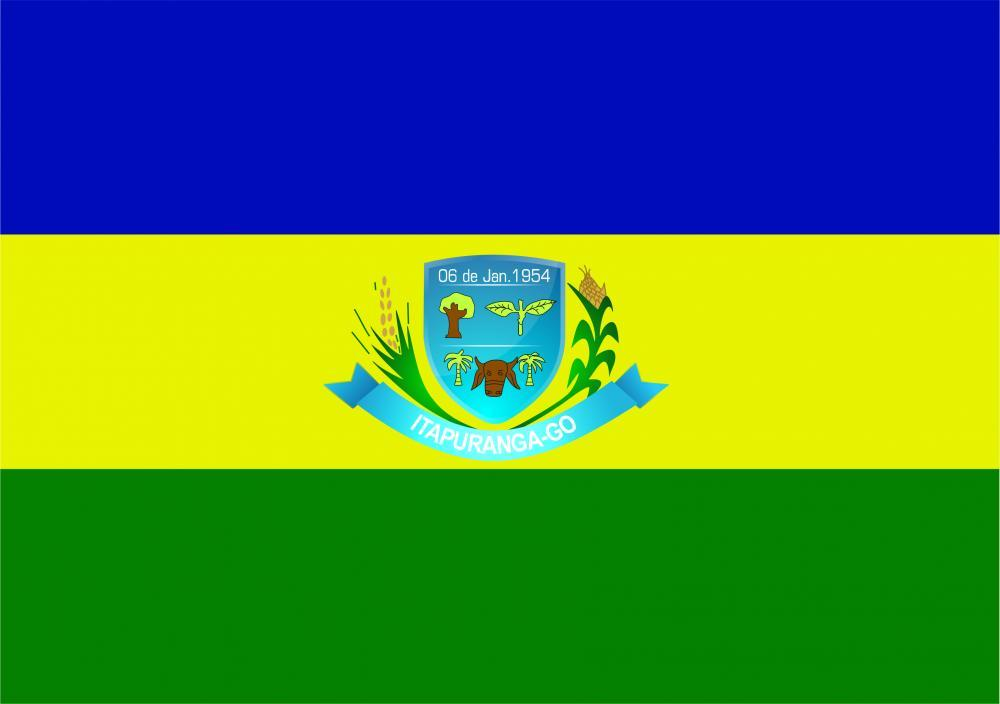
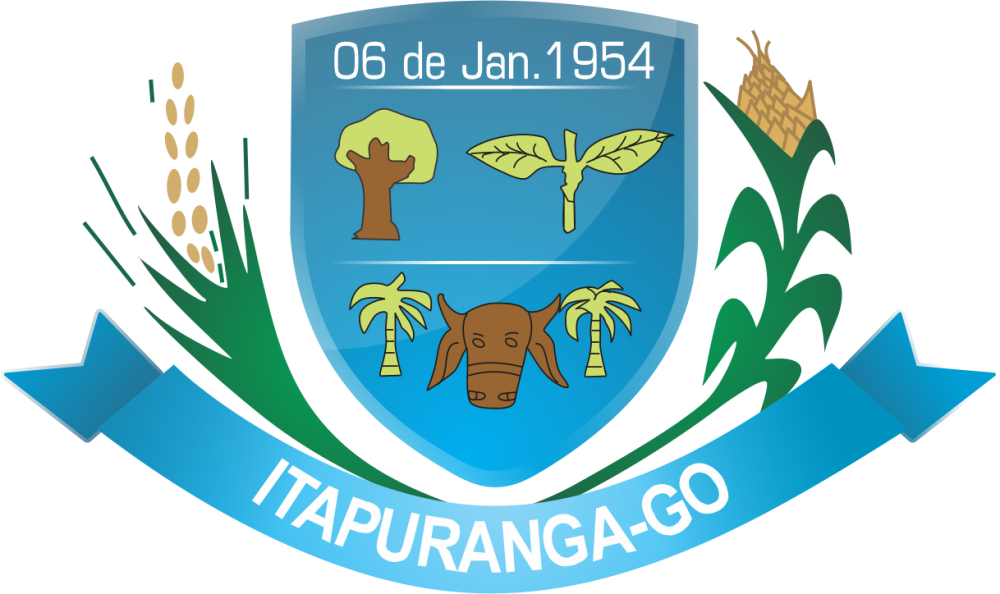
- Flag Coat of arms

- Location in Goiás state

- Location in Brazil
- Coordinates: 15°33′43″S 49°56′56″W
- Country: Brazil
- Region: Central-West
- State: Goiás
- Microregion: Ceres Microregion

Area
  - Total: 1,277 km^{2} (493 sq mi)
- Elevation: 651 m (2,136 ft)

Population (2020)
  - Total: 25,681
  - Density: 20.11/km^{2} (52.09/sq mi)
- Time zone: UTC−3 (BRT)
- Postal code: 76680-000

Itapuranga is a municipality in northern Goiás state, Brazil.

== Location and Climate ==
Itapuranga is located northwest of Goiânia and north of Goiás, the old capital of the state.

- Main highways of access from Goiânia are G0-070 to Itaberaí and state highway GO-156 north through Heitoraí. See Seplan

Because of its fertile soil and geo-economic location, Itapuranga is considered the capital of the Vale do São Patrício. Municipal boundaries are with: Carmo do Rio Verde, Faina, Goiás, Guarita, Heitoraí, Morro Agudo de Goiás, Uruana and São Patrício.

There are two well defined seasons, a rainy season from October to April, and a dry season, from May to September. The average annual minimum temperature is 11 °C, the maximum, 38 °C, and the average, 25 °C.

The vegetation is quite diversified: small clumps of forest, bushes, and grasses. The types of vegetation cover are: cerrado 8.2%, fields 4.4%, forest 3.0%. The cultivated area is 8.7% and the pasture land is 74.8%.

Districts, Villages, and Hamlets

- Districts: Cibele and Diolândia.
- Hamlets: Lajes and São José

== History ==
Itapuranga began in 1933 when Dominican friars from Goiás, acquired land from the government on the left bank of the Rio Canastra. The name of the settlement was "Xixá", taken from the Xixazeiro tree under which the first mass was celebrated. Joaquim Moreira da Silva opened the first general store and the town began to grow. Soon a public school was built and a road opened to the city of Goiás. In 1943 Xixá became a district of Goiás and the name was changed to Itapuranga, which means in the Tupi language "red rock" or "place of pretty rocks". In 1953 it was dismembered from Goiás to form a municipality.

== Demographics ==
- Population density: 19.44 inhabitants/km^{2} (2007)
- Population growth rate: -1.05% from 1996/2007
- Population in 1980: 30,358
- Population in 2007: 24,832
- Urban population in 1980: 15,492
- Urban population in 2007: 19,090
- Rural population in 1980: 14,866
- Rural population in 2007: 5,742

== The economy ==
The main economic activities were cattle raising, services, small industries, and agriculture are the main economic activities. In 2006 there were 1,441 farms with a total area of 65,894 hectares, of which 11,000 hectares were cropland and 40,400 hectares were pasture. The cattle herd had 134,000 head in 2006 and the main crops cultivated were bananas, sugarcane, rice, corn, coconuts, and soybeans. Sugarcane was the most important crop with 9,400 ha. planted and a production of 855,000 tons (2006). Corn was second with 5,500 ha. and 17,600 tons.

- Industrial establishments: 87
- Commercial retail establishments: 243
- Industrial park: Distrito Agroindustrial de Itapuranga - DIAI (June/2006)
- Financial institutions: Banco do Brasil S.A., BRADESCO S.A., Banco Itaú S.A.

=== Education and Health ===
In 2006 there were 27 schools with an enrollment of 6,799 students. There was one institute of higher education: UEG - Faculdade de Educação, Ciências e Letras de Itapuranga. The literacy Rate was 82.9%. In the health sector there were 5 hospitals with 141 beds. The infant mortality rate was 26.53 (in 1,000 live births)

Municipal Human Development Index

- MHDI: 0.735
- State ranking: 128 (out of 242 municipalities in 2000)
- National ranking: 2,312 (out of 5,507 municipalities in 2000)

For the complete list see frigoletto.com.br

== See also ==
- List of municipalities in Goiás
- Microregions of Goiás
