= Piracanjuba =

- Municipality
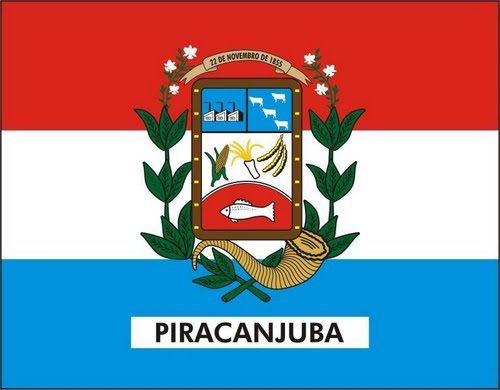
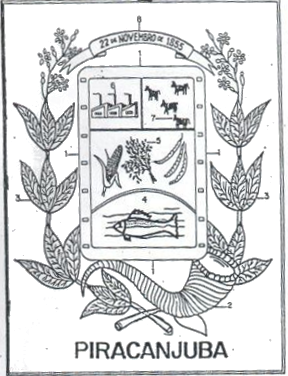
- Flag Coat of arms

- Location in Goiás state

- Location in Brazil
- Coordinates: 17°08′S 49°01′W
- Country: Brazil
- Region: Central-West
- State: Goiás
- Microregion: Meia Ponte Microregion

Area
  - Total: 2,405.1 km^{2} (928.6 sq mi)
- Elevation: 753 m (2,470 ft)

Population (2020)
  - Total: 24,548
  - Density: 10.207/km^{2} (26.435/sq mi)
- Time zone: UTC−3 (BRT)
- Postal code: 75640-000
- Website: www.piracanjuba.go.gov.br

Piracanjuba (Portuguese: [piɾakɐ̃ˈʒubɐ]) is a municipality in southeastern Goiás state, Brazil. It is a big producer of orchids, milk products, and soybeans. Piracanjuba is also the name of a fish (Brycon orbignyanus) common to the waters of the Plata River basin.

== Location ==
Piracanjuba is located southeast of Goiânia. It is in the valley of the Piracanjuba River, which flows to south to join the Paranaíba. The important BR-153 highway lies 23 km. to the west.

Distances to important cities are: Goiânia, 85 km; Morrinhos, 76 km;, Caldas Novas, 62 km; and Brasília, 282 km. The main highways are Go-413, Go-147, Go-405 and BR-153, the interstate linking Goiânia with the state of Minas Gerais. There are municipal boundaries with Morrinhos, Caldas Novas, and Professor Jamil.

== History ==
The origins of Piracanjuba go back to the nineteenth century when Padre Marinho began a settlement called Pouso Alto. A chapel was built in 1831 and by 1833 there were houses in the region. In 1855 it was elevated to district with the name Nossa Senhora da Abadia do Pouso Alto. In 1886 this name was changed to Piracanjuba. In 1907 once again the name was changed to Pouso Alto, only to return to Piracanjuba in 1943. Piracanjuba comes from the name of the river and a fish in the region. Later two districts, Cromínia and Mairipotaba, were dismembered to form separate municipalities.

== Origin of the name ==
The name "Piracanjuba" is derived from the fish with the same name (Triurobrycon lundii), which was once common in river waters of this region. ambientebrasil

== Political Information ==
- Mayor: Ricardo de Pina Cabral (January 2009)
- City council: 9
- Eligible voters: 18,227 (12/2007)

== Demographic Information ==
- Population density: 9.69 inhabitants/km^{2} (2007)
- Urban population: 16,752(2007)
- Rural population: 6,558 (2007)
- Population growth or loss: a gain of about 150 people since 1980

== Economic Information ==
The economy is based on agriculture, cattle raising, services, public administration, and small transformation industries. Piracanjuba is considered the state capital of orchids and is one of the largest producers of this flower in Brazil. Cattle raising, especially for dairy products, is the most important economic activity, but there are also large plantations of soybeans.

- Industrial units: 34 (2007)
- Commercial units: 238 (2007)
- Bank agencies: Banco do Brasil S.A. - BRADESCO S.A. - Banco Itaú S.A.

(June 2005) - CEF

- Dairy: Coop. Agrop. Mista de Piracanjuba Ltda. - Laticínios Bela Vista Ltda. (2007)
- Cattle herd: 199,400 head (2006)
- Poultry: 123,320 (2006)
- Swine: 15,680 (2006)
- Dairy cows: 61,200 (2006)
- Main crops (2006): pineapple, flowers, cotton, rice (3,800 hectares), coffee, beans, sunflowers, oranges, manioc, soybeans (50,500 hectares), tomatoes, and corn (2,150 hectares). Seplan
- Number of agricultural establishments: 1,947
- Agricultural area: 192,516
- Cropland: 36,500 ha.
- Natural pasture: 114,580 ha.
- People working in agriculture: 4,500 IBGE

== Education (2006) ==
- Schools: 30
- Students: 6,800
- Higher education: Faculdade de Piracanjuba - FAP
- Adult literacy rate: 87.7% (2000) (national average was 86.4%) Seplan

== Health (2007) ==
- Hospitals: 2
- Hospital beds: 80 Seplan
- Infant mortality rate: 24.95 (2000) (national average was 33.0).
- MHDI: 0.755
- State ranking: 67 (out of 242 municipalities in 2000)
- National ranking: 1,735 (out of 5,507 municipalities in 2000) For a complete list see Frigoletto.com

== Tourism ==
Piracanjuba is famous for its Orchid Exposition, which has been going on for the last 20 years. It is considered the largest event of this nature in the country, receiving more than 20 thousand visitors and 500 growers. For photos of the city see Photos of Piracanjuba.

== Media ==
There are three radio stations: Rádio Pouso Alto AM, Sol FM and Orquídea FM; two monthly newspapers, O Piracan and Cinco de Junho

== See also ==
- List of municipalities in Goiás
