= Cromínia =

- Municipality
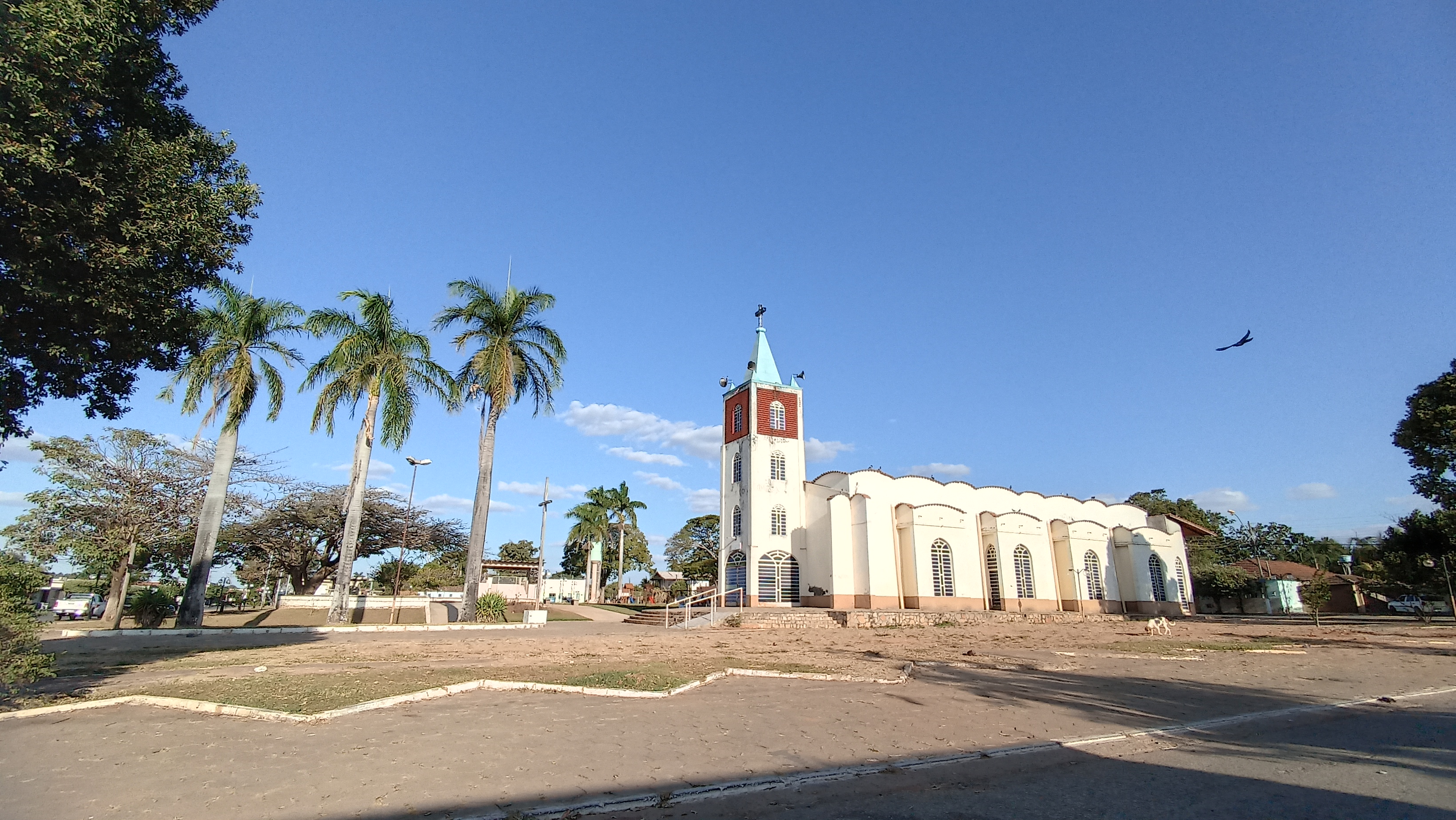

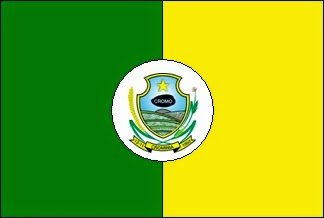
- Flag

- Location in Goiás state

- Location in Brazil
- Coordinates: 17°17′20″S 49°22′46″W
- Country: Brazil
- Region: Central-West
- State: Goiás
- Microregion: Meia Ponte Microregion

Area
  - Total: 371.1 km^{2} (143.3 sq mi)
- Elevation: 694 m (2,277 ft)

Population (2020)
  - Total: 3,472
  - Density: 9.356/km^{2} (24.23/sq mi)
- Time zone: UTC−3 (BRT)
- Postal code: 75635-000

Cromínia is a municipality in south Goiás state, Brazil. It is famous for its chrome mines.

== Geographical Information ==
Cromínia is located in the Meia Ponte Microregion, which includes the cities in the Meia Ponte River basin. It is approximately 87 kilometers south of the state capital, Goiânia and is 17 kilometers west of the important BR-153 highway, which links Goiânia to Minas Gerais.

Highway connections from Goiânia are made by BR-153 / Aparecida de Goiânia / Professor Jamil / GO-217. For the complete list of all distances in Goiás see Sepin Neighboring municipalities are:

- north: Aragoiânia
- east: Professor Jamil
- west and south: Mairipotaba

== Demographics ==
- Population density: 9.78 inhabitants/km^{2} (2007)
- Population growth rate 1996/2007: -0.21.%
- Total population: 3,618 (2007)
- Total population: 3,362 (1980)
- Urban population: 2,861 (2007)
- Rural population: 879 (2007)

== Economic Activities ==
Chrome mining gave the city its name but cattle raising and agriculture have taken over from mining. Of the 298 rural proprietors 70% raise cattle and the others plant rice and corn.

Economic Indicators

- Industrial units: 05
- Retail units: 53
- Banking institutions: none
- Cooperatives: Coop.Mista dos Produtores Rurais de Cromínia-COOMPOR-C
- Automobiles: 443 (Sepin/IBGE 2007)
- Cattle: 34,020 (2006)´
- Corn: 1,150 ha.
- Modest production of soybeans, rice, manioc, and watermelon

Farm Data (2006)in ha.

- Number of farms: 298
- Total area: 22,213
- Area of permanent crops: 88
- Area of perennial crops: 893
- Area of natural pasture: 18,242
- Persons dependent on farming: 940
- Farms with tractors: 52
- Number of tractors: 64 IBG

== Education and Health ==
- Literacy rate: 85.8%
- Infant mortality rate: 18.23 in 1,000 live births
- Schools: 6
- Students: 1,325
- Hospitals: 2
- Hospital beds: 31
- Health centers: 2

=== History ===
The town began in 1940 when three landowners give land to install a town which would be called Planura Verde (Green Plain). The settlement began to grow around a football field where locals came on Sunday to watch the games and pray at the foot of a cross. Soon the first houses were built. In 1943 the Arraial (village) was elevated to the category of district of Piracanjuba. It received the name "Cromínia" due to the great quantity of chrome in the region. In 1954 the district became a municipality.

Ranking on the Municipal Human Development Index

- MHDI: 0.769
- State ranking: 40 (out of 242 municipalities in 2000)
- National ranking: 1,347 (out of 5,507 municipalities in 2000)

For the complete list see Frigoletto
