= São Simão, Goiás =

São Simão
- Municipality
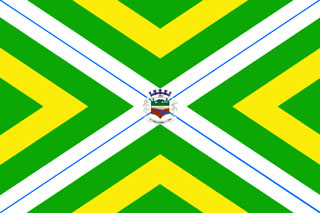
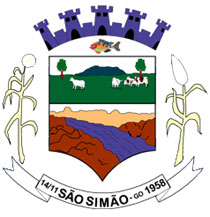
- Flag Coat of arms

- Location in Goiás state

- Location in Brazil
- Coordinates: 18°59′03″S 50°31′07″W
- Country: Brazil
- Region: Central-West
- State: Goiás
- Microregion: Quirinópolis Microregion

Area
  - Total: 414.0 km^{2} (159.8 sq mi)
- Elevation: 490 m (1,610 ft)

Population (2020)
  - Total: 20,985
  - Density: 50.69/km^{2} (131.3/sq mi)
- Time zone: UTC−3 (BRT)
- Postal code: 75890-000
- Website: www.saosimao.go.gov.br

São Simão is a municipality in south-central Goiás state, Brazil.

== Location ==
São Simão is strategically situated on the border of Goiás with Minas Gerais, which makes it a major river navigation link between central Brazil, the Prata river system and the South Atlantic. By way of the Paranaíba-Paraná-Tietê river system, from São Simão one can travel from Minas to São Paulo, Paraná, Paraguay and Argentina. The region has a mild tropical climate with an average annual temperature of 23 °C. The municipality has boundaries with Paranaiguara on the north; Santa Vitória-MG on the south and east; and Caçu on the west.

The region has good highway connections and is crossed by BR-365, which links São Simão to the Triângulo Mineiro and São Paulo; BR-364, which connects to the southeast of Goiás and Mato Grosso; and GO-060 and GO-164 with links to Goiânia and Brasília.

The distance to the state capital, Goiânia is 365 km. Highway connections are made by BR-060 / Abadia de Goiás / Guapó / Indiara / Acreúna / GO-164 / Santa Helena de Goiás / Quirinópolis / BR-483 / GO-164 / Paranaiguara / BR-364.

There is a regional airport with a paved runway measuring 1,800 meters in length and 45 meters in width. It can receive planes up to 99 tons. In the municipality there is also a district—Itaguaçu—and a village—Olaria. (Municipalities in Brazil are divided into "distritos", "povoados", and "aglomerados".)

== Demographics ==
- Population density in 2007: 33.41 inhabitants/km^{2}
- Population growth rate 1996/2007: 1.11.%
- Total population in 2007: 13,832
- Total population in 1980: 11,374
- Urban population in 2007: 13,464
- Rural population in 2007: 368
- Population change: the population has increased by about 2,450 inhabitants since 1980.

== The economy ==
The economy is based on tourism, subsistence agriculture, cattle raising, services, public administration (802 workers in 2003), and small transformation industries. Much of the income is generated by the hydroelectric plant. The cattle herd had 40,000 head (2006). The main agricultural products were rice, and corn.

Economic Data (2007)

- Industrial establishments: 19
- Financial institutions: Banco do Brasil S.A., Bradesco S.A., Banco Itaú S.A. (August/2007)
- Retail establishments in 2007: 192
- Automobiles: 1,463 (2007) There is one automobile for every 9.45 inhabitants. (2007)

Main agricultural products in ha.(2006)

- rice: 150
- corn: 600

Farm Data (2006)in ha.

- Number of farms: 69
- Total area: 17,550
- Area of permanent crops: 4
- Area of perennial crops: 4,760
- Area of natural pasture: 10,525
- Persons dependent on farming: 730
- Farms with tractors: 28
- Number of tractors: 69

São Simão is officially a port on the Paranaíba River, and is a major link on the Hidrovia Paranaíba-Tieté, Paraná, which is a waterway connecting these rivers to the port of Santos. There are warehouses both private and public for storing grains (mainly soybeans), which are transported in ships thousands of kilometers to the sea.

== Health and education ==
There were 10 schools (2006)and 01 hospital with 27 beds (2007).

- Adult literacy rate: 85.1% (2000) (national average was 86.4%)
- Infant mortality rate: 28.90 (2000) (national average was 33.0)
- Municipal Human Development Index: 0.754

== Tourism ==
Tourism is also very important with the huge São Simão lake nearby. The reservoir (674 km^{2} and 12,5 billion cubic meters of volume) is used for fishing, swimming, and nautical sports. One of the greatest tourist points of the region is the artificial beach on the banks of this reservoir, twice the size of Guanabara Bay, and formed by the building of the São Simão Dam. The beach is called Praia do Lago Azul and has one kilometer of beach with bars, showers, bike path, track, bathrooms, a camping area, and tropical vegetation.

São Simão is famous for its carnival celebration attracting major performers from around the country and thousands of tourists. The hotel infrastructure is quite large for such a small city with 18 hotels and one large campground on the shore of the lake. The gastronomic offering is also varied with 15 restaurants.

One of the most spectacular attractions is the Hydroelectric Plant of São Simão, located on the Paranaíba River. It began operating in 1978 with 1,710,000 MW of installed power with 6 generators. The dam is 3,600 meters long and 127 meters high and the useful volume of the reservoir is approximately 5,540 billion m³. According to the concession given by ANEEL, this reservoir can operate between the level of 390.5 m, denominated the minimum operating level, and 401 m, denominated the maximum operating level.

== History ==
The history of the city is connected to the construction of the São Simão dam and power station. Before 1930 the region was almost uninhabited. A small settlement appeared on the banks of the Paranaíba inhabited by diamond miners and fishermen. In 1935 a bridge was built connecting the states of Goiás and Minas Gerais and the town began to prosper. The population was already about 7,000. In 1957 this concrete bridge was washed away by torrential rains. The date is still remembered by the locals as Judgement Day. In 1961 a new bridge was finished and inaugurated by President Juscelino Kubitschek. In 1975, with the building of the dam, a new city for 10,000 people was created with mercury lamps, paved streets, and modern schools.

== See also ==
- List of municipalities in Goiás
- Microregions of Goiás
- Quirinópolis Microregion
