= Lagoa Santa, Goiás =

Lagoa Santa
- Municipality
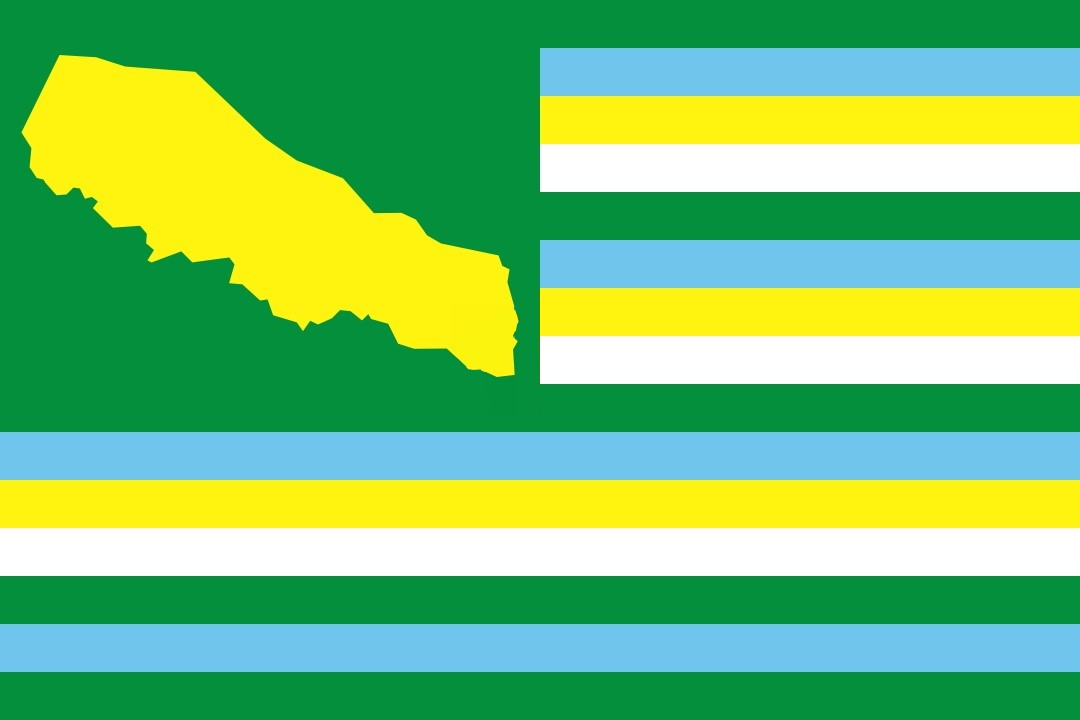
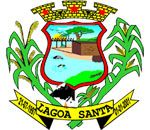
- Flag Coat of arms

- Location in Goiás state

- Location in Brazil
- Coordinates: 19°10′55″S 51°23′01″W
- Country: Brazil
- Region: Central-West
- State: Goiás
- Microregion: Quirinópolis Microregion

Area
  - Total: 458.8 km^{2} (177.1 sq mi)
- Elevation: 456 m (1,496 ft)

Population (2020)
  - Total: 1,621
  - Density: 3.533/km^{2} (9.151/sq mi)
- Time zone: UTC−3 (BRT)
- Postal code: 75819-000

Lagoa Santa is a municipality in southeast Goiás state, Brazil. Lagoa Santa is one of the most recent municipalities in the state, having been installed on 1 January 2001. It has hot water springs and is being developed as a resort.

== Location ==
Lagoa Santa is located on the border with the state of Mato Grosso do Sul, divided by the Aporé River, a tributary of the Paraná. It is 483 kilometers from the state capital, Goiânia and is connected by highways BR-153 and BR-060, leaving from São Paulo, and from Goiânia, by highways Br-060 and BR-164 and GO-206 and GO-302.

Connections with the state capital are made by BR-060 / Abadia de Goiás / Guapó / Indiara / Acreúna / Rio Verde / GO-174 / GO-422 / Caçu / GO-206 / Itarumã / GO-178 / Itajá / GO-302.

It has boundaries on the north, east, and west with Itajá, and on the south with the state of Mato Grosso do Sul.

== Geography ==
The average elevation is 380 meters and the average annual temperature is approximately 20 °C to 24 °C, with the minimum of 17 °C and the maximum of 31 °C. It is not uncommon to have cold fronts in the region, which come from the south. The climate is very humid, with humidity around 70%.

The town is crossed by the Rio Aporé, on the border with Mato Grosso do Sul. In the tropical forest along the river there is a natural lake, Lagoa Santa, with water temperatures of around 31 °C. This lake gave the town its name and is visited by tourists from all over the country, who seek a cure in the warm and medicinal waters of the lake.

== Demographics ==
- Population density in 2007: 2.67 inhabitants/km^{2}
- Total population in 2007: 5,409
- Urban population in 2007: 852
- Rural population in 2007: 373

== The economy ==
The economy is based on services, government jobs, modest agriculture and cattle raising, and income generated from tourism. The cattle herd was 48,000 (2006). Economic Data (2007)

- Industrial establishments: 0
- Retail establishments in 2007: 22
- Automobiles: 60 (2007)

Main agricultural products in ha.(2006)

- rice: 100
- corn: 200

Farm Data (2006)in ha.

- Number of farms: 81
- Total area: 42,940
- Area of permanent crops: 33
- Area of perennial crops: 166
- Area of natural pasture: 31,372
- Persons dependent on farming: 212
- Farms with tractors: 37
- Number of tractors: 66 IBGE

== Education and Health ==
There were 02 schools in activity (2006) and no hospitals.

- Literacy Rate: n/a
- Infant mortality rate: n/a (in 1,000 live births)

Lagoa Santa was first created a district of Itajá in 1988 with the name Termas de Lagoa Santa. In 1998 it became a municipality with the present name.

== See also ==
- List of municipalities in Goiás
- Microregions of Goiás
