= Cachoeira Alta =

- Municipality
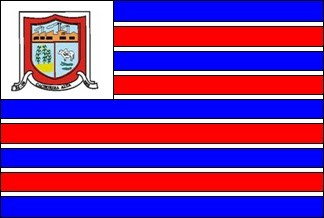
- Flag

- Location in Goiás state

- Location in Brazil
- Coordinates: 18°45′21″S 50°55′56″W
- Country: Brazil
- Region: Central-West
- State: Goiás
- Microregion: Quirinópolis Microregion

Area
  - Total: 1,654.3 km^{2} (638.7 sq mi)
- Elevation: 483 m (1,585 ft)

Population (2020)
  - Total: 12,666
  - Density: 7.6564/km^{2} (19.830/sq mi)
- Time zone: UTC−3 (BRT)
- Postal code: 75870-000
- Website: https://cachoeiraalta.go.gov.br/

Cachoeira Alta is a municipality in south Goiás state, Brazil. The population was 12,666 inhabitants in 2020 in a total area of 1659.4 km^{2}. Cachoeira Alta has one of the largest cattle herds in the state.

== Location ==
Cachoeira Alta is located in the Quirinópolis Microregion in an unpopulated area of the south of the state. Some of the largest municipalities in total area are located here. There are road connections with Aparecida do Rio Doce, 57 km. to the north; and Paranaiguara, 37 km. to the southeast.

The distance to the state capital, Goiânia, is 356 km. Highway connections are made by BR-060 / Guapó / Indiara / Acreúna / Rio Verde / GO-174 / GO-422 / Aparecida do Rio Doce / BR-364. See Sepin

Neighboring municipalities are:

- north and east: Quirinópolis and Aparecida do Rio Doce
- south and west: Caçu
- east: Paranaiguara

== Demographics ==
- Population density in 2007: 4.90 inhabitants/km^{2}
- Population growth rate 1996/2007: -0.19.%
- Total population in 2007: 8,103
- Total population in 1980: 9,243
- Urban population in 2007: 5,965
- Rural population in 2007: 2,138

(Sepin/IBGE)

== The economy ==
The economy is based on cattle raising for meat and milk production, and agriculture, especially the planting of corn and rice. The cattle herd was 163,000 head including 12,000 milking cows in 2006.

Economic Data

- Industrial establishments: 17
- Retail commercial establishments: 124
- Financial establishments: Banco do Brasil S.A. (August/2007)
- Meat packing plants: Arantes Alimentos Ltda. (22/05/2006)
- Dairies: Laticínios Sabor Goiano Ltda., Agrolima Indústria e Comércio de Laticínio Ltda., Indústria e Comércio de Laticínio Estrela do Oriente Ltda., Goiásminas Indústria de Laticínios Ltda. (22/05/2006)

Main agricultural production in planted area

- Rice: 80 ha.
- Banana: 16 ha.
- Rubber (coagulated): 140 ha.
- Manioc: 50 ha.
- Corn: 400 ha.

Farm Data (2006) in ha.

- Number of farms: 718
- Total area: 138,781
- Area of permanent crops: 346
- Area of perennial crops: 1,573
- Area of natural pasture: 106,800
- Persons dependent on farming: 1,430
- Farms with tractors: 195 IBGE

== Health and education ==
The infant mortality rate was 28.90 (2000) while the literacy rate was 84.4% (2000). There were 11 schools with 2,213 students and 02 hospitals with 41 beds.

Municipal Human Development Index: 0.737

- State ranking: 116 (out of 242 municipalities in 2000)
- National ranking: 2,245 (out of 5,507 municipalities in 2000) See Frigoletto

== History ==
The first European settlement on record occurred in 1876 when Manoel Batista Barroso, travelling medicine salesman, and Gabriel Paula do Amaral, settled on the right bank of the Cachoeira Alta River, five kilometers above where it meets the Rio Claro. In 1920 the town had grown and was officially called Cachoeira Alta, because of the river. In 1931 it became a district belonging to Rio Verde, being raised to municipal status in 1953.

== See also ==
- List of municipalities in Goiás
- Quirinópolis Microregion
- Microregions of Goiás
