= Paranaiguara =

- Municipality
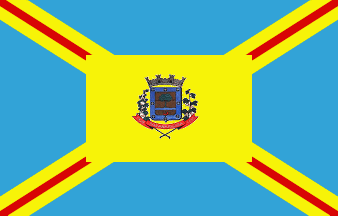
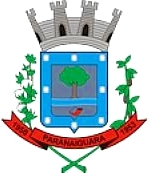
- Flag Coat of arms

- Location in Goiás state

- Location in Brazil
- Coordinates: 18°54′25″S 50°39′19″W
- Country: Brazil
- Region: Central-West
- State: Goiás
- Microregion: Quirinópolis Microregion

Area
  - Total: 1,153.7 km^{2} (445.4 sq mi)
- Elevation: 479 m (1,572 ft)

Population (2020)
  - Total: 10,140
  - Density: 8.789/km^{2} (22.76/sq mi)
- Time zone: UTC−3 (BRT)
- Postal code: 75880-000

Paranaiguara is a municipality in south Goiás state, Brazil.

== Location and Geography ==
Paranaiguara is in the Quirinópolis Microregion, whose most important city is Quirinópolis. The distance to the state capital, Goiânia, is 351 km. Highway connections are made by BR-060 / Abadia de Goiás / Guapó / Indiara / Acreúna / GO-164 / Quirinópolis / BR-483 / GO-164. See Sepin

There are municipal boundaries with:

- north: Quirinópolis
- south: São Simão
- east: São Simão and Santa Vitória, Minas Gerais
- west: Cachoeira Alta and Caçu

The climate is temperate tropical, with an average annual temperature of 26 °C. There are maximums of 26 °C and minimums of 10 °C. The main river is the Paranaíba, which has tributaries such as the Rio Claro and Ribeirão Alegre.

== Demographics ==
- Population density in 2007: 6.69 inhabitants/km^{2}
- Population growth rate 1996/2007: -0.67.%
- Total population in 2007: 7,724
- Total population in 1980: 6,782
- Urban population in 2007: 6,991
- Rural population in 2007: 733
- Population change: the population has increased by about 960 inhabitants since 1980.

== The economy ==
The economy is based on agriculture, cattle raising, services, public administration, and small transformation industries. In the secondary sector there are clothing industries, brickworks, and a paving company. The cattle herd had 110,000 head (2006) and the main agricultural crops were corn and soybeans.

Economic Data (2007)

- Industrial establishments: 18
- Financial institutions: Banco Itaú S.A. (August/2007)
- Retail establishments in 2007: 88
- Automobiles: 976 (2007)

Main agricultural products in ha.(2006)

- rice: 170
- manioc: 40
- corn: 200
- soybeans: 400

Farm Data (2006)in ha.

- Number of farms: 239
- Total area: 92,485
- Area of permanent crops: 78
- Area of perennial crops: 1,433
- Area of natural pasture: 71,227
- Persons dependent on farming: 566
- Farms with tractors: 102
- Number of tractors: 143 IBGE

== Education and Health ==
There were 05 schools (2006) and 01 hospital with 23 beds (2007).

- Adult literacy rate: 84.3% (2000) (national average was 86.4%)
- Infant mortality rate: 22.10 (2000) (national average was 33.0)
- Ranking on the Municipal Human Development Index: 0.751 (middle)

For the complete list see Frigoletto.com

== History ==
Paranaiguara began in the 1930s when diamond prospectors came into the area. In 1950 the settlement became a district of Quirinópolis and in 1967 it got its emancipation with the present name. The name means "inhabitants of the great river" in Tupi-guarani. In 1976 the construction of the São Simão Dam and reservoir forced the evacuation of the old town, which was moved 15 kilometers away.

== See also ==
- List of municipalities in Goiás
- Microregions of Goiás
- Quirinópolis Microregion
