= Palminópolis =

- Municipality
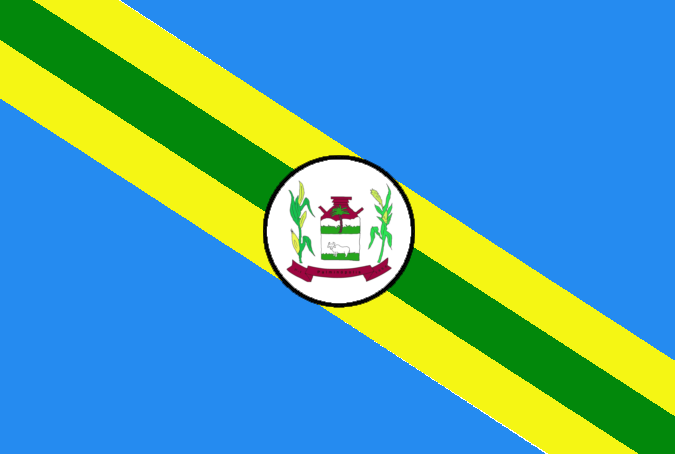
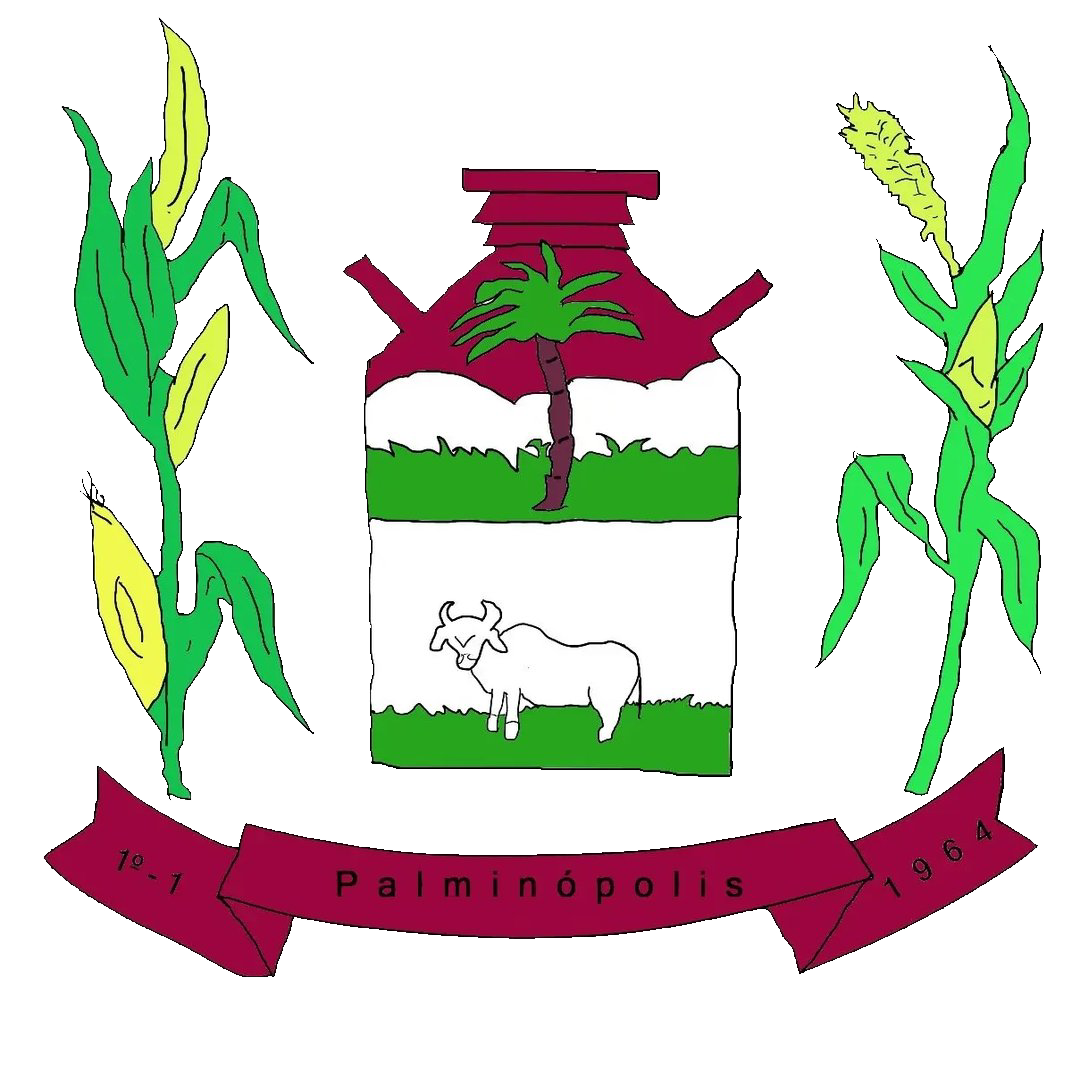
- Flag Coat of arms

- Location in Goiás state

- Location in Brazil
- Coordinates: 16°47′46″S 50°09′18″W
- Country: Brazil
- Region: Central-West
- State: Goiás
- Microregion: Vale do Rio dos Bois

Area
  - Total: 387 km^{2} (149 sq mi)
- Elevation: 719 m (2,359 ft)

Population (2020)
  - Total: 3,582
  - Density: 9.26/km^{2} (24.0/sq mi)
- Time zone: UTC−3 (BRT)
- Postal code: 75990-000

Palminópolis is a municipality in eastern Goiás state, Brazil.

== Location ==
Nearby towns are Palmeiras de Goiás, 28 km. to the east, and Turvânia, 22 km. to the north. The Turvo River lies to the west.

- Distance to regional center (São Luís de Montes Belos): 41 km.
- Highway connections from Goiânia: state highway BR-069 west from Goiânia, through Trindade / GO-050 / Campestre de Goiás / GO-156.

Neighboring municipalities: São João da Paraúna, Palmeiras de Goiás, Jandaia, Paraúna and Turvânia

== Political Information ==
- Mayor: Franc Helviz Vaz (January 2025)
- City council: 9
- Eligible voters: 3,294 (December 2007)

== Demographic Information ==
- Population density: 9.34 inhabitants/km^{2} (2007)
- Urban population: 2,421 (2007)
- Rural population: 1,201 (2007)
- Population growth: a loss of about 800 people since 1980

== Economic Information ==
The economy is based on agriculture, cattle raising, services, public administration, and small transformation industry. There is one dairy and one meat packing plant (frigorífico).

- Industrial units: 6 ( June 2007)
- Commercial units: 37 ( August 2007)
- Dairy: Indústria e Comércio de Laticínios Saltador Ltda. (22/05/2006)
- Meat-packing plant: Coop. Agrop. dos Prod. Organ. do Estado de Goiás. (22/05/2006)
- Motor vehicles: 361 automobiles and pickup trucks (2007), which gave a ratio of 10 inhabitants for each motor vehicle.
- Cattle herd: 48,660 head
- Main crops: rice, rubber, corn, soybeans (800 hectares), and tomatoes.
- Number of farms: 423
- Agricultural area: 44,756
- Planted area: 4,100 ha.
- Area of natural pasture: 33,678 ha.
- Persons employed in agriculture: 2,120

== Education (2006) ==
- Schools: 4 with 1,018 students
- Higher education: none
- Adult literacy rate: 87.9% (2000) (national average was 86.4%)

== Time Capsule - 2026 to 2064 ==
In 2026, the municipality established the Palminópolis Time Capsule project through Municipal Law No. 028/PMP/2026. The initiative was conceived by historian Mauro Júnior and retired teacher Jaci Pagoto, with the aim of preserving historical records, documents, photographs, objects, testimonies, and messages produced by the local population at the time, for future generations.

Closing ceremony of the Palminópolis Time Capsule on October 31, 2026, at 930 a.m., in João Elias Pinheiro Square.

The capsule was sealed on Saturday, October 31, 2026, at approximately 9:30 a.m., in João Elias Pinheiro Square (known locally as Masonic Square), during celebrations marking the municipality's 62nd anniversary. Its contents are scheduled to be publicly opened on October 31, 2064, when Palminópolis will celebrate 100 years of political emancipation.

The project constitutes a historical record of Palminópolis society in 2026, bringing together contributions from residents of different age groups and professional backgrounds. Participation was open to the entire community, with the purpose of enabling future generations to learn about aspects of life, culture, and customs in the municipality during the 21st century.

== Health (2007) ==
- Hospitals: 1
- Hospital beds: 20
- Ambulatory clinics: 3
- Infant mortality rate: 22.64 (2000) (national average was 33.0)

Ranking on the Municipal Human Development Index

- MHDI: 0.753
- State ranking: 70 (out of 242 municipalities)
- National ranking: 1,797 (out of 5,507 municipalities)

Data are from 2000. For the complete list see Frigoletto.com

== History ==
Palminópolis began in 1949 when lands belong to a cattle ranch were distributed to make lots. The first settlement was called São Bento, which was later changed to Palminópolis due to the proximity of Palmeiras de Goiás. In 1953 it became a district of Palmeiras de Goiás, separating in 1961 to become a municipality.

== See also ==
- List of municipalities in Goiás
- Microregions of Goiás
