= Lagoa Santa =

Lagoa Santa may refer to the following places in Brazil:

- Lagoa Santa, Goiás
- Lagoa Santa, Minas Gerais
