= São João da Paraúna =

- Municipality
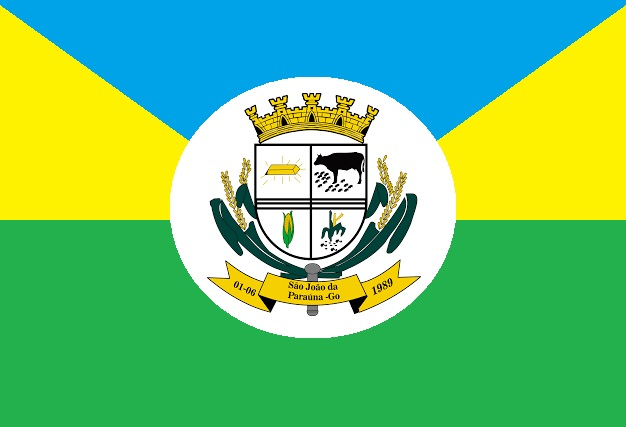
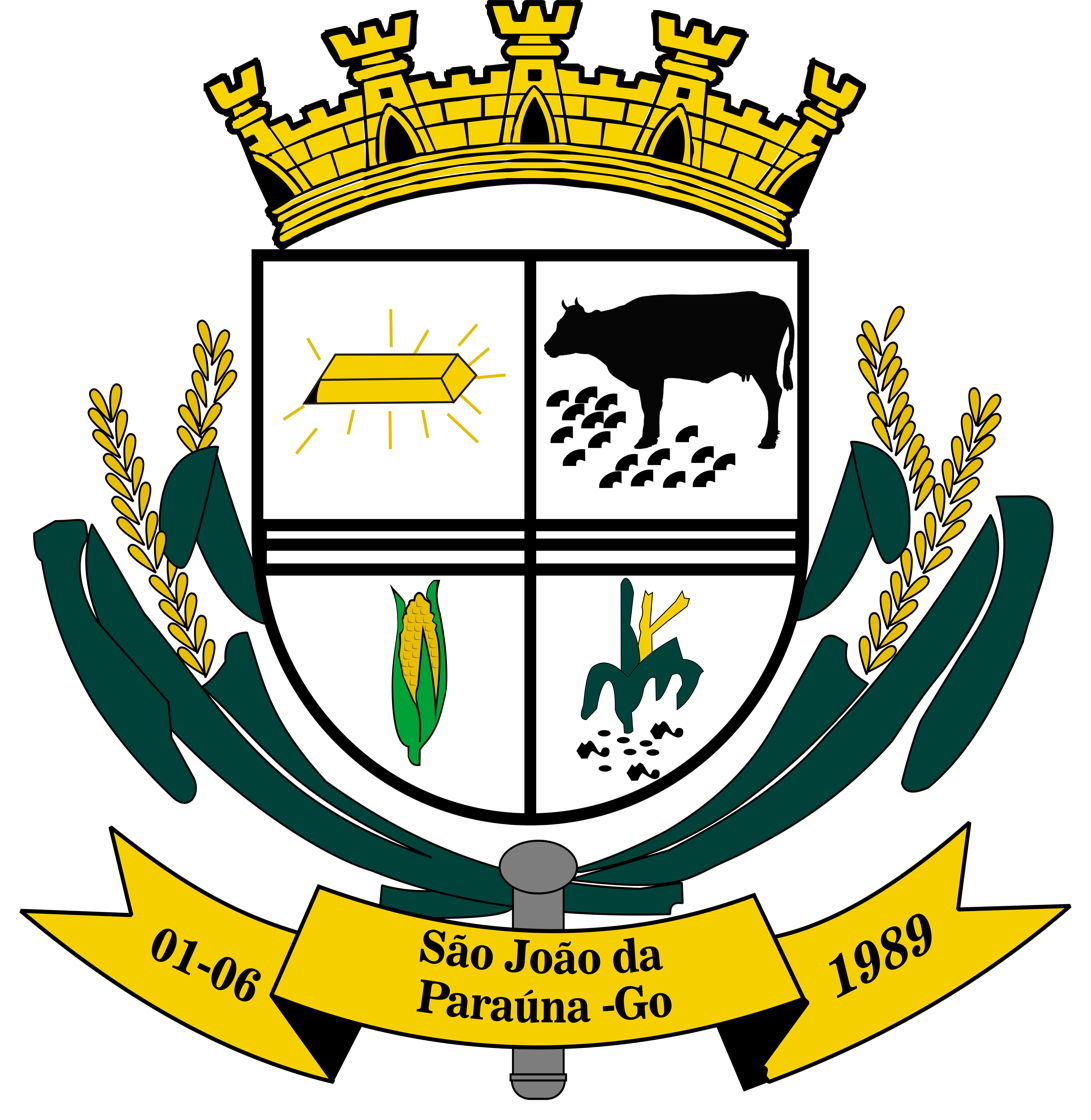
- Flag Coat of arms

- Location in Goiás state

- Location in Brazil
- Coordinates: 16°48′39″S 50°23′39″W
- Country: Brazil
- Region: Central-West
- State: Goiás
- Microregion: Vale do Rio dos Bois

Area
  - Total: 305.3 km^{2} (117.9 sq mi)
- Elevation: 640 m (2,100 ft)

Population (2020)
  - Total: 1,345
  - Density: 4.406/km^{2} (11.41/sq mi)
- Time zone: UTC−3 (BRT)
- Postal code: 75985-000

São João da Paraúna is a municipality in western Goiás state, Brazil.

== Location ==
São João is located west of Goiânia, 36 km. north of Paraúna.

- Highway connections from Goiânia: state highway BR-069 west from Goiânia, through Trindade, Santa Bárbara de Goiás, Firminópolis, and then GO-164 for 32 kilometers south.

Neighboring municipalities: Aurilândia, Paraúna, Palminópolis, Jandaia, Acreúna.(Firminopolis), (São Luis dos Montes Belos).

== Political information ==
- Mayor: Claudivino Ferreira da Silva (January 2005)
- City council: 09 members
- Eligible voters: 1,687 (December/2007)

== Demographic information ==
- Population density: 5.56 inhabitants/km^{2} (2007)
- Urban population: 1,212 (2007)
- Rural population: 487 (2007)
- Population growth: a gain of about 300 people since 1980

== Economic information ==
The economy is based on subsistence agriculture, cattle raising, services, public administration, and small transformation industries.

- Industrial units: 1 (2007)
- Commercial units: 17 (2007)
- Dairy: Laticínios MB Ltda (22/05/2006)
- Motor vehicles: 200 (2007), which gave a ratio of 8.5 inhabitants for each motor vehicle. (motorcycles and motorbikes not counted)
- Cattle herd: 30,500 head (5,190 milk cows) (2006)
- Main crops (2006): cotton, rice, beans, manioc, corn (1,340 hectares), and soybeans (2,900 hectares).

Data are from Sepin

== Education (2006) ==
- Schools: 2
- Students: 453
- Higher education: none
- Adult literacy rate: 87.1% (2000) (national average was 86.4%)

== Health (2003) ==
- Hospitals: 0
- Hospital beds: 0
- Ambulatory clinics: 2
- Infant mortality rate: 13.70 (2000) (national average was 33.0)

Municipal Human Development Index

- Life expectancy: 73.5
- School attendance rate: 0.837
- MHDI: 0.779
- State ranking: 34 (out of 242 municipalities in 2000)
- National ranking: 1,093 (out of 5,507 municipalities in 2000)

Data are from 2000

For the complete list see Frigoletto.com

== See also ==
- List of municipalities in Goiás
