= Gouvelândia =

- Municipality
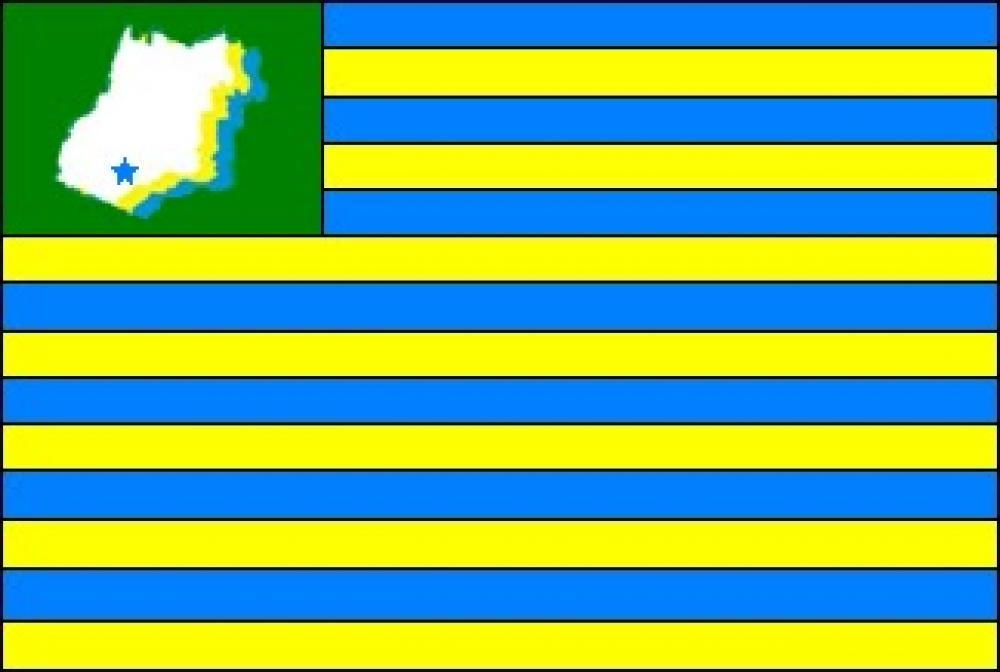
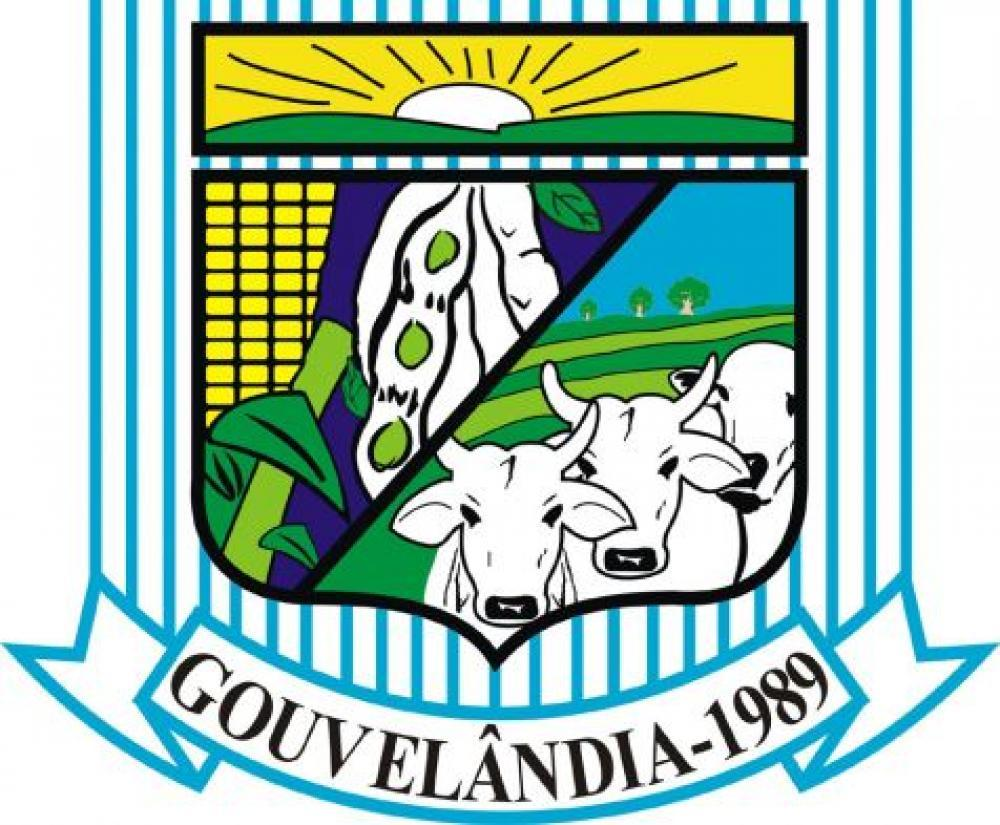
- Flag Coat of arms

- Location in Goiás state

- Location in Brazil
- Coordinates: 18°26′36.1″S 50°08′08.6″W
- Country: Brazil
- Region: Central-West
- State: Goiás
- Microregion: Quirinópolis Microregion

Area
  - Total: 830.77 km^{2} (320.76 sq mi)
- Elevation: 395 m (1,296 ft)

Population (2020)
  - Total: 5,988
  - Density: 7.208/km^{2} (18.67/sq mi)
- Time zone: UTC−3 (BRT)
- Postal code: 75865-000

Gouvelândia is a municipality in south Goiás state, Brazil. Gouvelândia is a large producer of sesame and peanuts.

== Location ==
Gouvelândia is located in the Quirinópolis Microregion, 35 kilometers west of the most important city, Quirinópolis. The Rio dos Bois, a tributary of the Paranaíba crosses the region. The southern boundary is with the São Simão artificial lake and the border with the state of Minas Gerais.

The distance to state capital, Goiânia, is 299 km. Highway connections from Goiânia are by GO-040 / Aragoiânia / Cromínia / GO-215 / Pontalina / GO-040 / Aloândia / Bom Jesus de Goiás / BR-452 / Itumbiara / GO-206 / BR-483 / Cachoeira Dourada / Inaciolândia. See Sepin for all the distances.

Neighboring municipalities are:

- north: Castelândia
- south: Santa Vitória, Minas Gerais
- east: Inaciolândia
- west: Quirinópolis

== Demographics ==
- Population density in 2007: 5.43 inhabitants/km^{2}
- Population growth rate 1996/2007: 0.98.%
- Total population in 2007: 4,507
- Total population in 1980: 4,136
- Urban population in 2007: 3,466
- Rural population in 2007: 1,041
- Population change: the population has increased about 350 inhabitants since 1980.

== The economy ==
The main economic activities were cattle raising and agriculture. Agricultural production was based on cattle raising (73,000 in 2006), cotton, peanuts, sesame seeds, corn, and soybeans.

Economic Data (2007)

- Industrial establishments: 5
- Financial Institutions in 2007: Banco do Brasil S.A.
- Retail establishments in 2007: 1,282
- Automobiles: 258 (2007)

Main agricultural products in ha.(2006)

- cotton: 146
- sugarcane: 5,000
- corn: 2,500
- sesame: 1,500 (largest producer in the state)
- soybeans: 4,000

Farm Data (2006)in ha.

- Number of farms: 115
- Total area: 885,613
- Area of permanent crops: not available
- Area of perennial crops: 129,010
- Area of natural pasture: 657,315
- Persons dependent on farming: 310
- Farms with tractors: 44
- Number of tractors: 84 IBGE

== Health and education ==
There were 04 schools with 1,640 students (2006). There were no hospitals.

- Literacy rate: 84.0%
- Infant mortality rate: 24.07 in 1,000 live births
- Ranking on the Municipal Human Development Index: 0.754
- State ranking: 114 (out of 242 municipalities in 2000)
- National ranking: 2,228 (out of 5,507 municipalities in 2000) For the complete list see Frigoletto

Gouvelândia first became a district of Quirinópolis in 1963, gaining municipal status in 1983.

== See also ==
- List of municipalities in Goiás
