= Varjão =

- Municipality
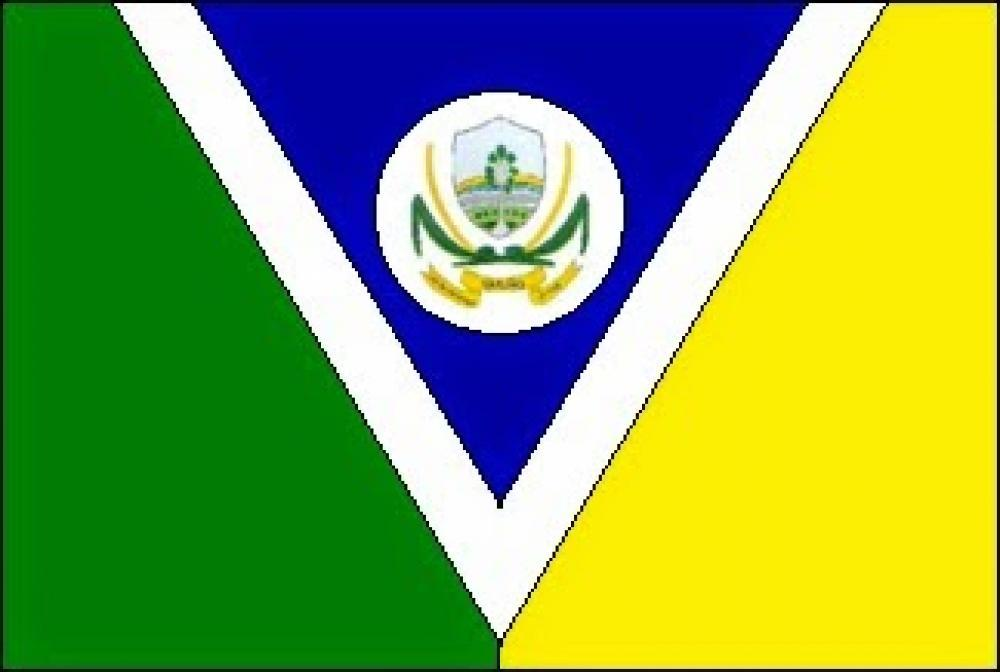
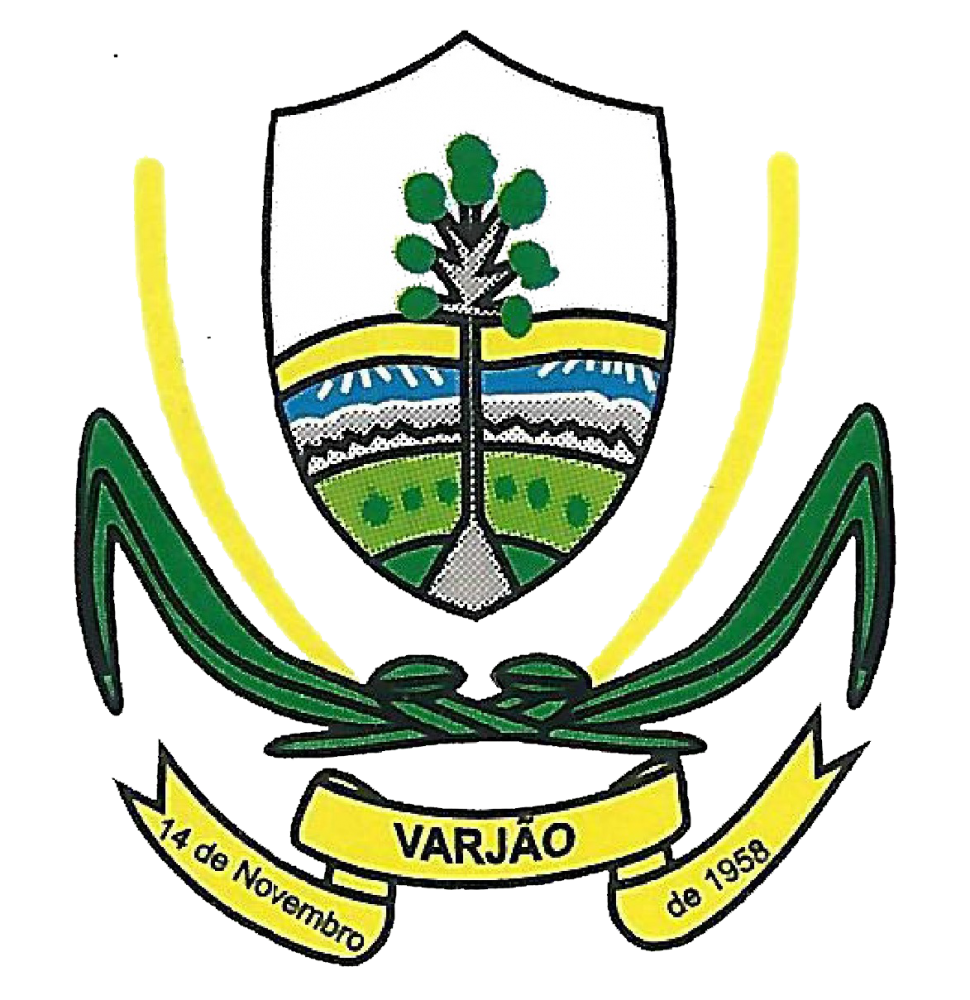
- Flag Coat of arms

- Location in Goiás state

- Location in Brazil
- Coordinates: 17°02′42″S 49°37′54″W
- Country: Brazil
- Region: Central-West
- State: Goiás
- Microregion: Vale do Rio dos Bois

Area
  - Total: 519 km^{2} (200 sq mi)
- Elevation: 609 m (1,998 ft)

Population (2021)
  - Total: 3,848
  - Density: 7.41/km^{2} (19.2/sq mi)
- Time zone: UTC−3 (BRT)
- Postal code: 75355-000
- Website: https://varjao.go.gov.br/

Varjão is a municipality in western Goiás state, Brazil.

== Geography and Demographics ==
Varjão is located 77 km. southwest of Goiânia and is 26 km. southeast of Cezarina. Highway connections from Goiânia are made by BR-060/Abadia de Goiás/Guapó/GO-413. Aragoiânia, Cezarina, Indiara, Mairipotaba are adjacent to Varjão. Its postcode (CEP) is 75355–000, and its IBGE statistical microregion is 014 Vale do Rio dos Bois.

As of July 2021, the Brazilian Institute of Geography and Statistics estimates the population of Varjão to be 3,848 inhabitants.

== Government ==
As of December 2020, Rafael Pereira Machado Franco is Varjão's mayor. The city council has nine members and there are 3,022 eligible voters as of April 2006.

== Economy ==
The economy is based on subsistence agriculture, cattle raising, services, public administration, and small transformation industries.

- Industrial units: 1 (2007)
- Commercial units: 38 (2007)
- Motor vehicles: 420 (2007), which gave a ratio of 9 inhabitants for each motor vehicle
- Cattle herd: 48,000 head (7,210 milk cows) (2006)
- Poultry: 19,300 head (2006)
- Swine: 3,450 head (2006)
- Main crops: rice (200 hectares), sugarcane, oranges, beans, manioc, corn (600 hectares), and soybeans. (Sepin)

== Health and education ==
In 2006, the 1,141 students in Varjão were served by four schools, with a total of 22 classrooms and 27 teachers. In 2000, its school attendance rate was 0.806. There are no higher education facilities. Varjão's adult literacy rate was 83.0% in 2000, just below the national average of 86.4%.

In 2003, there were no hospitals and two ambulatory clinics in Varjão. In 2002, two doctors, one nurse, and one dentist lived in the town. The town's infant mortality rate 22.64 (2000) is well below the national average of 33.0. In 2000, the town's life expectancy was 69.4.

The score on the Municipal Human Development Index was 0.729 in 2000, ranking it at 149 out of 242 municipalities in the state of Goiás and 2,456 out of 5,507 municipalities in Brazil overall.

== See also ==
- List of municipalities in Goiás
- Microregions of Goiás
