= Edéia =

- Municipality
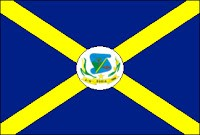
- Flag

- Location in Goiás state

- Location in Brazil
- Coordinates: 17°20′15″S 49°55′43″W
- Country: Brazil
- Region: Central-West
- State: Goiás
- Microregion: Vale do Rio dos Bois

Area
  - Total: 1,466.3 km^{2} (566.1 sq mi)
- Elevation: 601 m (1,972 ft)

Population (2020)
  - Total: 12,467
  - Density: 8.5024/km^{2} (22.021/sq mi)
- Time zone: UTC−3 (BRT)
- Postal code: 75940-000
- Website: www.camaraedeia.go.gov.br

Edéia is a municipality in south-central Goiás state, Brazil.

== Municipal Boundaries ==
Edéia is in the Vale do Rio dos Boisstatistical micro-region and has municipal boundaries with:

- north: Indiara
- west: Acreúna and Turvelândia
- east: Edealina
- south: Pontalina and Vicentinópolis

Highway connections with the state capital, Goiânia, are made by BR-060 / Guapó / Cezarina / Indiara / GO-320.

== Political data ==
- Eligible voters: 7,839 (12/2007)
- Mayor: Elson Tavares de Freitas (January 2005)
- Vice-mayor: Amilson Ferreira Borges
- Councilmembers: 09

== Demographic data ==
- Population density: 7.01 inhabitants/km^{2} (2003)
- Population growth rate 2000/2007: 0.05%
- Population in 1980: 12,597
- Population in 1991: 8,999
- Urban population in 2007: 8,511
- Rural population in 2007: 1,740

== Economic data ==
- Industrial units: 10 (06/2007)
- Retail units: 117 (August/2007)
- Banking institutions: Banco do Brasil S.A. - Banco Itaú S.A. (08/2007)
- Automobiles: 1,092 in 2007
- Cooperatives: Coop. Educacional de Edéia Ltda - CEDEL

=== Agriculture ===
- Cattle: 79,439 head (2006)
- Cotton 360 ha. /648 tons
- Corn: 2,000 ha. /12,400 tons
- Soybeans: 57,800 ha. / 150,280 tons
- Number of farms: 472
- Agricultural area: 108,948 ha.
- Planted area: 45,400 ha.
- Area of natural pasture: 42,840 ha.
- Workers in agriculture: 1,300

== Education and health ==
- Literacy rate: 86.5% (2000)
- Infant mortality rate: 22.64 in 1,000 live births (2000)
- Schools: 09 with 2,727 students (2006)
- Higher education: Pólo Universitário da UEG
- Hospitals: 02 with 26 beds (2007)

== History ==
Edéia began around 1915, in the settlement called Povoado de Santo Antônio do Alegrete, near the Turvo and Bois rivers, where a chapel to Saint Anthony was erected. Later the name was changed to Alegrete and later in 1938 to Edéia, of unknown origin. The first commercial house appeared in 1913 and the settlement got its municipal emancipation in 1948. Electricity arrived only in 1966.

Ranking on the Municipal Human Development Index

- MHDI: 0.759
- State ranking: 58 (out of 242 municipalities in 2000)
- National ranking: 1,624 (out of 5,507 municipalities in 2000)

For a complete list see Frigoletto

== See also ==
- List of municipalities in Goiás
- Microregions of Goiás
