= Itajá, Goiás =

Itajá
- Municipality
- The Municipality of Itajá
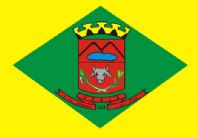
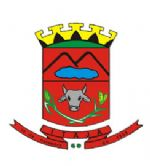
- Flag Coat of arms

- Location of São Miguel do Araguaia in Goiás
- Coordinates: 19°04′18″S 51°32′34″W
- Country: Brazil
- Region: Central-West
- State: Goiás
- Founded: November 14, 1958

Government
  - Mayor: Luciano Leão (DEM)

Area
  - Total: 2,091.394 km^{2} (807.492 sq mi)
- Elevation: 442 m (1,450 ft)

Population (2020)
  - Total: 4,475
  - Density: 2.8/km^{2} (7.3/sq mi)
- Time zone: UTC−3 (BRT)
- HDI (2000): 0.747 – medium

Itajá is a city in southwest Goiás state, Brazil. Itajá is a large producer of beef cattle.

Itajá is part of the Quirinópolis Microregion. It is located eight kilometers north of the Aporá River, which forms the boundary between the states of Goiás and Mato Grosso do Sul.

Itajá is 408 kilometers from the state capital, Goiânia, and is connected by BR-060 / Abadia de Goiás / Guapó / Indiara / Acreúna / Rio Verde / GO-174 / GO-422 / Caçu / GO-206 / Itarumã / GO-178. See Sepin for all the distances.

== History ==
The settlement began in 1947 with the name Fortaleza de São João. By 1953, it had grown so much that it became a district of Jataí with the name São João. In 1958 it was given municipality status with the name of Itajá, an inversion of the name "Jataí", the municipality from which it had been dismembered.

== Geography ==
The region is rich in water resources, with several important rivers: Paranaíba, Aporé and Corrente. There is also a lake with hot water, with a temperature of 42 °C. Tourism is considered one of the most important industries. There are still stretches of tropical forest mixed with cerrado. Animal life in the region includes giant anteaters, capibara, foxes, armadillos, wolves, jaguars, seriema, macaws, parrots and others.

Itajá included a village (povoado) called Vila Nossa Senhora Perpétuo Socorro.

== Demographics ==
- Population density in 2007: 2.59 inhabitants/km^{2}
- Population growth rate 1996/2007: 4.18.%
- Total population in 2007: 5,409
- Total population in 1980: 6,289
- Urban population in 2007: 3,750
- Rural population in 2007: 1,659
- Population change: the population has decreased by about 900 inhabitants since 1980.

== Economy ==
The economy is based on services, small industries, agriculture and cattle raising. There are also three brickworks employing around one thousand people. Cattle raising is one of the major sources of income for the region although it provides relatively few jobs. The total number in 2006 was 176,000 head.

=== Economic Data (2007) ===
- Industrial establishments: 18
- Meat packing plant: JERIVÁ - Com. Ind. e Agropecuária Ltda. (22/05/2006)
- Retail establishments in 2007: 49
- Automobiles: 451 (2007)

=== Main agricultural products in ha.(2006) ===
- rice: 190
- manioc: 10
- corn: 130
- soybeans: 500

=== Farm Data (2006)in ha. ===
- Number of farms: 283
- Total area: 237,327
- Area of permanent crops: not available
- Area of perennial crops: 696
- Area of natural pasture: 177,522
- Persons dependent on farming: 720
- Farms with tractors: 105
- Number of tractors: 173 IBGE

== Education and Health ==
There were 05 schools with 1,590 students (2006) and 01 hospital with 13 beds (2006).

- Literacy Rate: 84.6%
- Infant mortality rate: 22.10 (in 1,000 live births)

Ranking on the Municipal Human Development Index: 0.747

- State ranking: 83 (out of 242 municipalities in 2000)
- National ranking: 1,868 (out of 5,507 municipalities in 2000) For the complete list see Frigoletto

== See also ==
- List of municipalities in Goiás
