= Itarumã =

- municipality
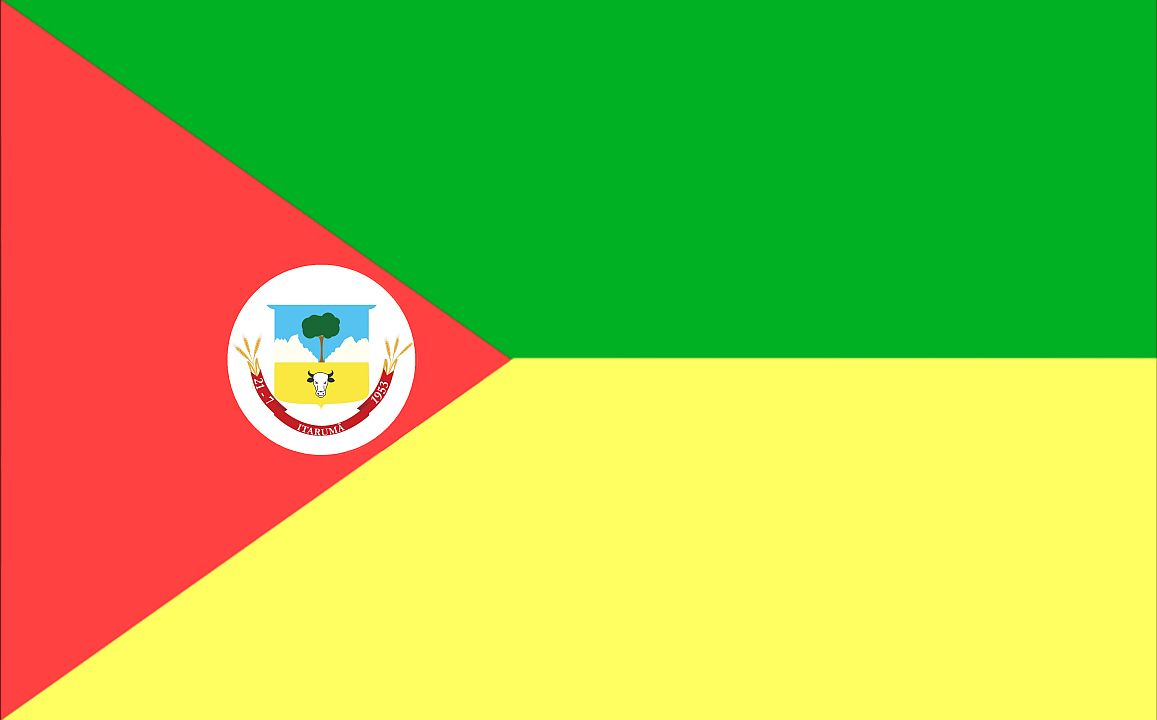
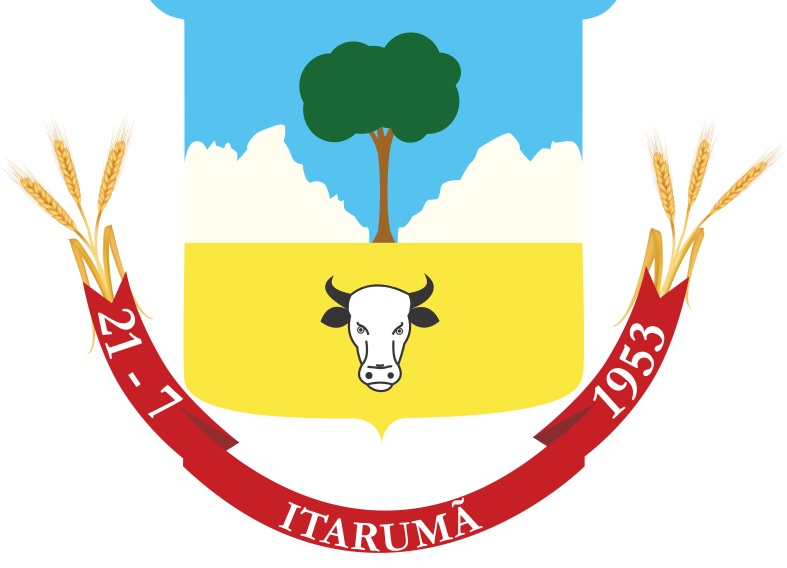
- Flag Coat of arms

- Location of the municipality in Goiás
- Coordinates: 18°46′08″S 51°20′52″W
- Country: Brazil
- State: Goiás
- Mesoregion: Sul Goiano
- Microregion: Quirinópolis
- Founded: 21 July 1953

Government
  - Prefect: Wilmar Bento Severino

Area
  - Total: 3,433 km^{2} (1,325 sq mi)
- Elevation: 474 m (1,555 ft)

Population (2020)
  - Total: 7,259
  - Density: 2.114/km^{2} (5.476/sq mi)
- Time zone: UTC−3 (BRT)

Itarumã is a municipality in south Goiás state, Brazil. In 2020, it had a population of 7,259. Itarumã is a large producer of cattle with a herd of almost three hundred thousand head.

== Location ==
Itarumã is located in the Quirinópolis Microregion and is connected by paved roads with Caçu, 40 kilometers to the north; and Itajá, 45 kilometers to the south. It is 366 kilometers to the state capital, Goiânia, which is connected by BR-060 / Abadia de Goiás / Guapó / Indiara / Acreúna / Rio Verde / GO-174 / GO-422 / Caçu / GO-206. See Sepin for all the distances.

Municipal boundaries are with:

- north: Caçu, Serranópolis, and Jataí
- south: Itajá
- east: Limeira do Oeste (Minas Gerais)
- west: Aporé and Serranópolis

== Demographics ==
- Population density in 2007: 1.55 inhabitants/km^{2}
- Population growth rate 1996–2007: 1.00.%
- Total population in 2007: 5,338
- Total population in 1980: 5,579
- Urban population in 2007: 3,479
- Rural population in 2007: 1,859
- Urban population in 2022: 6,101
- Population change: the population has decreased by about 240 inhabitants since 1980.

Itarumã has one district: Olaria do Angico

== The economy ==
The economy is based on cattle raising and cultivation of soybeans, rice, corn, sugarcane, and beans. The cattle herd is one of the largest in the state with 292,000 head.

Economic Data (2007)

- Industrial establishments: 11
- Retail establishments in 2007: 62
- Dairies: Laticínios ABC Ind. e Comércio Ltda. Parmalat Brasil S/A - Indústria de Alimentos. (22/05/2006)
- Financial institutions: Banco do Brasil S.A. (August/2007)
- Automobiles: 373 (2007)

Main agricultural products in ha.(2006)

- rice: 400
- corn: 1,400
- soybeans: 1,500

Farm Data (2006)in ha.

- Number of farms: 411
- Total area: 254,132
- Area of permanent crops: 123
- Area of perennial crops: 263
- Area of natural pasture: 206,464
- Persons dependent on farming: 950
- Farms with tractors: 146
- Number of tractors: 211 IBGE

== Education and Health ==
There were 4 schools (2006) and 1 hospital with 13 beds (2007).

- Literacy Rate: 85.3%
- Infant mortality rate: 28.88 (in 1,000 live births)
- Ranking on the Municipal Human Development Index: 0.735 (medium)
- State ranking: 126 (out of 242 municipalities in 2000)
- National ranking: 2,307 (out of 5,507 municipalities in 2000) For a complete list see Frigoletto.com

== History ==
The documented history of European settlement of Itarumã begins in 1874 when Heitor Severino built the first house of palm fronds. The village was given the name of São Sebestião da Pimenta, honoring the saint and Dona Francisca Pimenta, a rich landowner of the region. The district was created in 1901, belonging to Jataí, and on an unknown date the name was shortened to Pimenta. In 1943 the name was changed to Itarumã. In 1953 it was dismembered from Jataí and became a municipality.

== See also ==
- List of municipalities in Goiás
- Microregions of Goiás
