= Edealina =

- Municipality
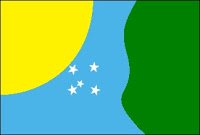
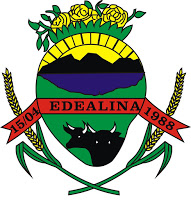
- Flag Coat of arms

- Location in Goiás state

- Location in Brazil
- Coordinates: 17°25′34″S 49°39′30″W
- Country: Brazil
- Region: Central-West
- State: Goiás
- Microregion: Vale do Rio dos Bois

Area
  - Total: 606.6 km^{2} (234.2 sq mi)
- Elevation: 578 m (1,896 ft)

Population (2020)
  - Total: 3,688
  - Density: 6.080/km^{2} (15.75/sq mi)
- Time zone: UTC−3 (BRT)
- Postal code: 75945-000

Edealina is a municipality in central-south Goiás state, Brazil.

== Location ==
Edealina has municipal boundaries with Edéia, Pontalina, Indiara, and Cezarina The important Rio dos Bois forms part of the municipal boundary.

Highway communications with Goiânia are made by BR-060 / Guapó / Cezarina / Indiara / GO-320 / Edéia / GO-215. Sepin

== Political Data ==
- Eligible voters: 3,162 (12/2007)
- Mayor (prefeito): Vantuir Alves de Oliveira (2005)
- Vice-mayor (vice-prefeito): Nixon Claer de Urzêda
- Councilmembers (vereadores): 09

== Demographic Data ==
- Population density: 6.16 inhabitants/km^{2} (2007)
- Population growth rate 2000/2007: -0.32.%
- Population in 1991: 4,039
- Urban population: 2,557 (2007)
- Rural population: 1,161 (2007)

== Economy ==
The economy is based on soybeans, corn, rice, beans, tomatoes and on cattle raising. In some areas pivot sprinklers are being used. In the industrial sector there is a dairy, and several brickworks.

=== Economic Data ===
- Industrial units: 05 ( 06/2007)
- Retail units: 35 (08/2007)
- Banking institutions: none (2007)
- Dairies: Coop. M. dos Prod. de Leite de Morrinhos Ltda. (22/05/2006)
- Cattle: 56,350 (2006)
- Modest production of cotton—rice (700 hectares)
- Corn: 3,900 hectares (2006)
- Soybeans: 13,500 hectares planted
- Motor vehicles: 374 automobiles in 2007

Agricultural Data for 2006

- Number of farms: 410
- Total area: 56,584
- Planted area: 11,600
- Area of natural pasture: 33,025
- Workers in agriculture: 1,300

== Education and Health ==
- Literacy rate: 83.5% (2000)
- Infant mortality rate: 12.88 in 1,000 live births (2000)
- Schools: 03 with 1,055 students in 2006
- Hospitals: 0
- Public health clinics (SUS): 04

Ranking on the Municipal Human Development Index

- MHDI: 0.768
- State ranking: 43 (out of 242 municipalities in 2000)
- National ranking: 1,393 (out of 5,507 municipalities in 2000)

For the complete list see Frigoletto.com

History Edealina was first created as a district in 1976 in the municipality of Edéia. In 1988 it was dismembered from Edéia and made a municipality. The origin of the name is unknown.

== See also ==
- List of municipalities in Goiás
- Microregions of Goiás
