= Microregion of Vale do Rio dos Bois =

Coordinates: 17°23′45″S 50°22′37″W

Vale do Rio dos Bois
- Microregion
- Location in Goias state
- Country: Brazil
- State: Goiás
- Mesoregion: Sul Goiano
- Municipalities: 13

Area
  - Total: 13,654 km^{2} (5,272 sq mi)

Population (2007)
  - Total: 107,317
  - Density: 7.9/km^{2} (20/sq mi)

Vale do Rio dos Bois Microregion is a statistical region in central Goiás state, Brazil. It lies west of the state capital, Goiânia. It takes its name from the Rio dos Bois, a river that flows through the microregion.

== Municipalities ==
The microregion consists of the following municipalities:

- Acreúna
- Campestre de Goiás
- Cezarina
- Edealina
- Edéia
- Indiara
- Jandaia
- Palmeiras de Goiás
- Palminópolis
- Paraúna
- São João da Paraúna
- Turvelândia
- Varjão

== See also ==
- List of municipalities in Goiás
- Microregions of Goiás
