= Microregion of Quirinópolis =

Coordinates: 18°26′52″S 50°27′07″W

Quirinópolis
- Microregion
- Location in Goias state
- Country: Brazil
- State: Goiás
- Mesoregion: Sul Goiano
- Municipalities: 9

Area
  - Total: 16,118 km^{2} (6,223 sq mi)

Population (2006)
  - Total: 95,094
  - Density: 5.9/km^{2} (15/sq mi)

The Quirinópolis Microregion is a region in south Goiás state, Brazil. It includes 8 municipalities with a population of 95,094 (2007) and a total area of 16,117.60 km^{2}.

- Municipalities gaining population since 1980: Caçu, Paranaiguara, Quirinópolis, São Simão.
- Municipalities losing population since 1980: Cachoeira Alta, Itajá, Itarumã.
- Municipalities formed after 1980: Gouvelândia and Lagoa Santa.

== Municipalities ==
The microregion consists of the following municipalities:

Municipality	Area (km^{2})	Inhabitants in 2007	Population density in 2007 (inhabitants/km^{2})	Population growth rate 1996/2007 (%)
Cachoeira Alta	1,659	8,103	4.90	-0.19
Caçu	2,258	10,892	4.84	0.4
Gouvelândia	833	4,507	5.43	0.98
Itajá	2,091	5,409	2.59	4.18
Itarumã	3,444	5,338	1.55	-1.00
Lagoa Santa	459	1,225	2.67	n/a
Paranaiguara	1,157	7,724	6.69	-0.67
Quirinópolis	3,792	38,064	10.07	0.65
São Simão	415	13,832	33.41	1.11

== Economics ==
Municipality	GDP 2005 (R$1,000.00)	Corn production in 2007 (tons)	Soybean production in 2007 (tons)	Cattle 2006 (head)
Cachoeira Alta	86,978	1,800	n/a	163,000
Caçu	76,642	1,800	1,960	211,000
Gouvelândia	42,593	13,750	11,200	73,000
Itajá	43,899	765	560	177,000
Itarumã	58,584	6,000	4,500	292,000
Lagoa Santa	10,357	1,020	n/a	48,000
Paranaiguara	45,758	1,000	1,120	110,000
Quirinópolis	284,370	35,400	25,000	356,000
São Simão	870,974	3,000	n/a	40,000

== Health and education ==
Municipality	MHDI 2000	Literacy rate 2000	Infant mortality rate 2000
Cachoeira Alta	0.737	84.4	28.90
Caçu	0.783	86.8	16.89
Gouvelândia	0.738	84.2	22.10
Itajá	0.747	84.6	22.10
Itarumã	0.735	85.3	28.88
Lagoa Santa	n/a	n/a	n/a
Paranaiguara	0.751	84.3	22.10
Quirinópolis	0.780	87.1	16.81
São Simão	0.754	85.1	28.90

== See also ==
- Microregions of Goiás
- List of municipalities in Goiás
