= Jandaia =

- Municipality
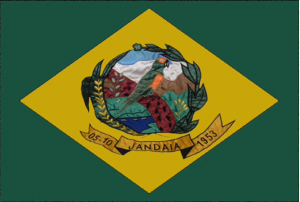
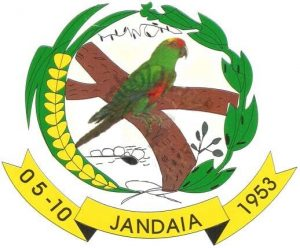
- Flag Coat of arms

- Location in Goiás state

- Location in Brazil
- Coordinates: 17°02′31″S 50°08′36″W
- Country: Brazil
- Region: Central-West
- State: Goiás
- Microregion: Vale do Rio dos Bois

Area
  - Total: 864.1 km^{2} (333.6 sq mi)
- Elevation: 637 m (2,090 ft)

Population (2020)
  - Total: 6,025
  - Density: 6.973/km^{2} (18.06/sq mi)
- Time zone: UTC−3 (BRT)
- Postal code: 75950-000
- Website: www.jandaia.go.gov.br

Jandaia is a municipality in the eastern portion of the Brazilian state of Goiás.

== Location and connections ==
Jandaia has municipal boundaries with:

- Northwest: Palmeiras de Goiás
- Northeast: Palminópolis
- North, South, and Southwest: Indiara
- East and Southeast: Paraúna

Jandaia is 21 kilometers northwest of Indiara and the junction with the main BR-060 highway. Connections with Goiânia are made by highways BR-060 / Abadia de Goiás / Guapó / Indiara / GO-320.

The climate is tropical humid with an average annual temperature of 27 °C. The main rivers are the Turvo, Capivari, and Galheiros.

== Political data ==
- Mayor: Jerônimo Pereira Lopes
- Vice-mayor: Geni Rosa de Mesquita
- Number of councilmembers: 9
- Total number of eligible voters: 5,626 (12/2007)

== Demographic data ==
- Population density: 7.38 inhabitants/km^{2} (2007)
- Population in 1980: 10,981 (2,469 urban and 8,512 rural)
- Population in 1991: 6,474 (3,524 urban and 2,950 rural)
- Population in 2003: 6,301 (4,197 urban and 2,104 rural) (1)
- Population in 2007: 6,373 (4,157 urban and 2,216 rural)

(1)Estimated by logistic method

- Population growth rate 1991/1996: 0.82%
- Population growth rate 1991/2000: -0.23%
- Population growth rate 2000/2007: 0.07%

== Economy ==
The economy is based on milk production and sugar cane cultivation. There are small industries producing dairy products, animal feed, and alcoholic beverages. In 2006 there were 75,000 head of cattle. The main crops in planted area were sugarcane (9,140 hectares), corn, and soybeans.

=== Economic Data ===
- Distilleries: DENUSA - Destilaria Nova União S/A (June/2005)
- Banking Establishments: - Banco do Brasil S.A. - BRADESCO S.A.

== Education (2006) ==
- Schools in activity: 8 with 1,653 students
- Higher education: 0
- Literacy Rate: 87.5%

== Health (2007) ==
- Hospitals: 1 with 15 beds
- Infant mortality rate: 34.48 (in 1,000 live births)

== History ==
The history of Jandaia is related to the cult of Our Lady of Abadia and Santa Luzia. In 1927 a rancher, Bernardino Vivaldo dos Santos, who had bought lands in the region, donated land for the building of a chapel. More land was bought and houses appeared around the chapel. The settlement was called Água Limpa and it became a district in 1935. With the construction of the new highway, Goiânia to Rio Verde, the region began to develop. The name was changed to Jandaia, a type of parrot found in the region, and in 1953 it became a municipality, separating from Palmeiras de Goiás.

== Ranking on the Municipal Human Development Index ==
- MHDI: 0.746
- State ranking: 88 (out of 242 municipalities in 2000)
- National ranking: 1,995 (out of 5,507 municipalities in 2000)

Data are from 2000. For the complete list see Frigoletto.com

== See also ==
- List of municipalities in Goiás
