= Paraúna =

- Municipality
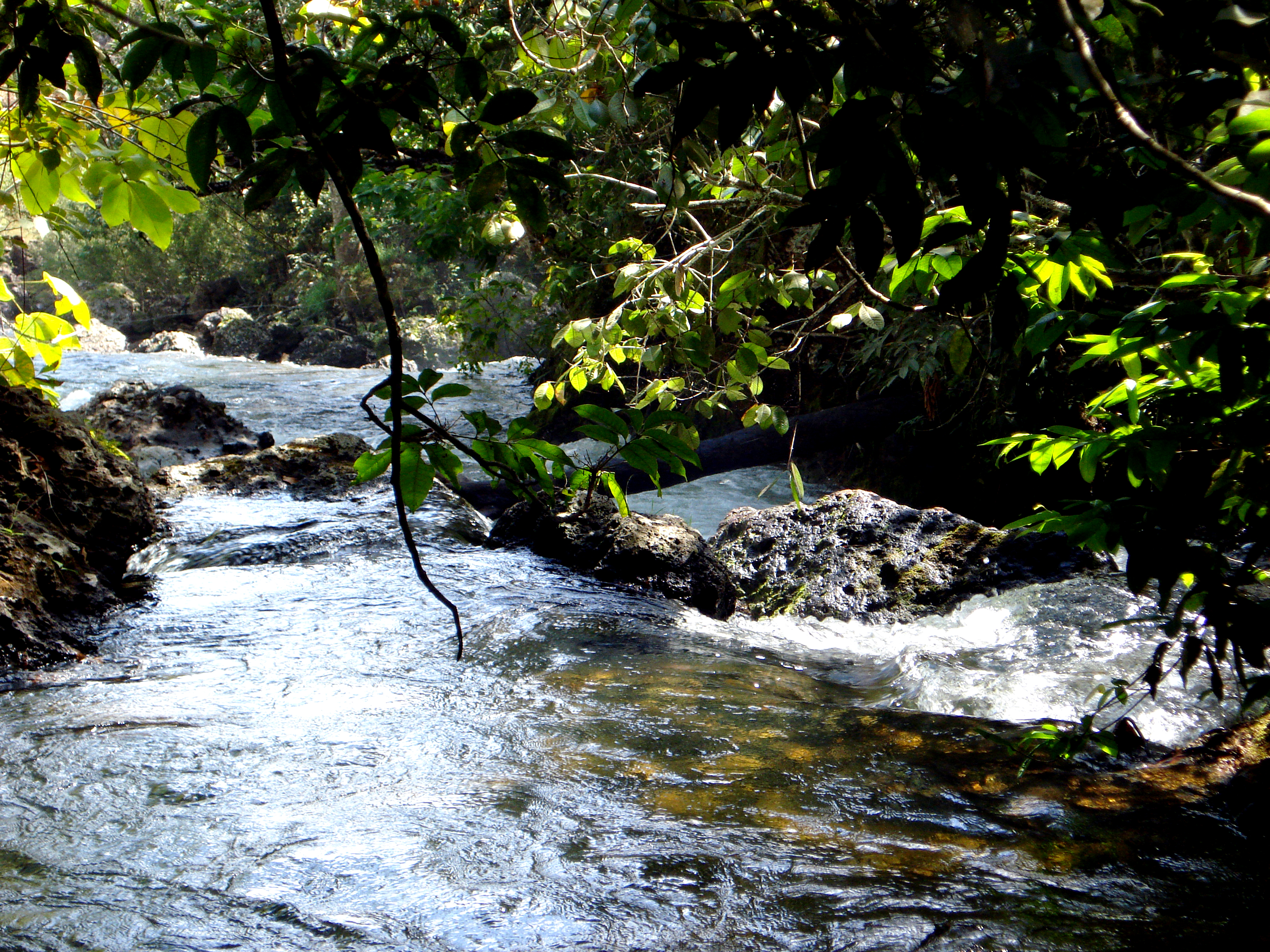

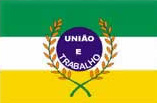
- Flag

- Location in Goiás state

- Location in Brazil
- Coordinates: 16°57′04″S 50°24′37″W
- Country: Brazil
- Region: Central-West
- State: Goiás
- Microregion: Vale do Rio dos Bois Microregion

Area
  - Total: 3,781.2 km^{2} (1,459.9 sq mi)

Population (2020)
  - Total: 10,980
  - Density: 2.904/km^{2} (7.521/sq mi)
- Time zone: UTC−3 (BRT)
- Postal code: 75980-000
- Website: www.parauna.go.gov.br

Paraúna is a municipality in southwestern Goiás state, Brazil. It has strange rock formations and is a large producer of cotton and soybeans.

== Location ==
Highway connections with Goiânia are made by BR-060 / Abadia de Goiás / Guapó / Indiara / GO-320 / Jandaia. See Sepin for all the distances.

Municipal boundaries:

- North: Aurilândia
- South: Jandaia
- East: São João da Paraúna
- West: Palestina de Goiás, Caiapônia, and Montividiu.

== Climate ==
The climate is tropical, typical of medium elevations, with the dry period of the year occurring between July and October and the wet period occurring between November and March. The average elevation is 800 metres (2,600 ft) above sea level.

== Political and Demographic Information ==
- Mayor: Sebastião Ferro de Moraes (January 2005)
- City council: 9
- Eligible voters: 8,269 (December 2007)
- Population density: 2.89 inhabitants/km^{2} (2005)
- Urban population: 7,649 (2007)
- Rural population: 3,277 (2007)
- Population growth or loss: a loss of about 2,000 people since 1980

== Economic information ==
The economy is based on agriculture, cattle raising, services, public administration, and small transformation industries.

- Industrial units: 19 (2007)
- Commercial units: 92 (2007)
- Bank agencies: Banco Itaú S.A. - Banco do Brasil S.A. - BRADESCO S.A.
- Dairies: Paraúna Indústria e Comércio de Laticínios Ltda. - Lactouna Ind. e Com. de Leite e Derivados Ltda
- Meat processing plant: Pifpaf
- Motor vehicles: 1,072 automobiles and pickup trucks (2007), which gave a ratio of 10 inhabitants for each motor vehicle. In this calculation we did not count motorcycles, which were 717 in 2007.
- Cattle herd: 197,000 head (2006)
- Poultry: 84,000 (2006)
- Dairy cows: 17,740 (2006)
- Main crops (2006): cotton (9,880 hectares), rice, coffee, sugarcane, manioc, corn, and soybeans (62,000 hectares).

See Sepin

Agricultural data for 2006

- Number of farms: 746
- Total agricultural area: 254,548 ha.
- Planted area: 70,700 ha.
- Area of natural pasture: 129,973 ha.
- Number of persons employed in agriculture: 2,160

== Education (2006) ==
- Schools: 1 with
- Students: 3,426
- Higher education: none
- Adult literacy rate: 85.0% (2000) (national average was 86.4%)

== Health (2007) ==
- Hospitals: 1
- Hospital beds: 41
- Infant mortality rate: 25.29 (2000) (national average was 33.0)

== Tourism ==
The municipality is one of the main tourist attractions in the state of Goiás. In the Serra do Caiapó immense stone walls extend for several kilometers. Inscriptions on the stone indicate to some the existence of a pre-Columbian civilization but to others the rocks are natural formations sculpted by the wind or the result of shaping caused by waves when this region was under the sea. Visitors describe a city of stone, with buildings, objects, and animals carved out by the forces of mother nature.

The Ecological Park of Paraúna is one of the most visited points of ecological tourism in the region. The park has a mission to protect the natural environment of the region, such as the sandstone formations, caverns and a subterranean river.

== History ==
The first name of the settlement, which appeared in the beginning of the nineteenth century, was Bota Fumaça (Fire Belcher) and then became São José do Turvo, due to the Turvo River. The present name, given in 1930, is of tupi-guarani origin. "Para" means river and "Una" means black. The town was elevated to the condition of municipality in 1934.

Ranking on the Municipal Human Development Index

- Life expectancy: 68.4
- Adult literacy rate: 0.834
- School attendance rate: 0.766
- MHDI: 0.742
- State ranking: 99 (out of 242 municipalities)
- National ranking: 2,092 (out of 5,507 municipalities)

Data are from 2000. For the complete list see Frigoletto.com

== See also ==
- List of municipalities in Goiás
- Microregions of Goiás
