= Campestre de Goiás =

- Municipality
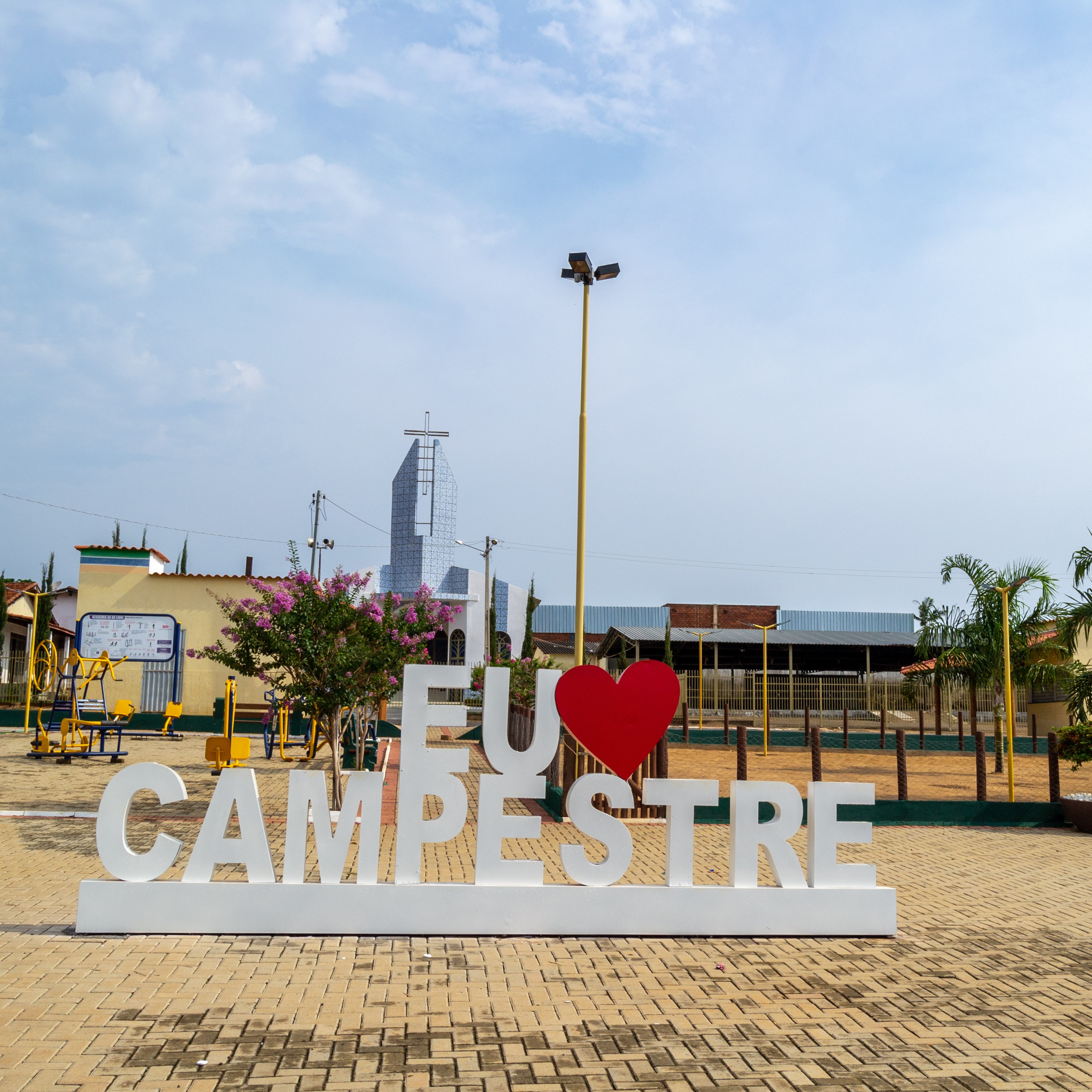

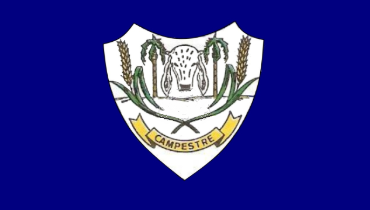
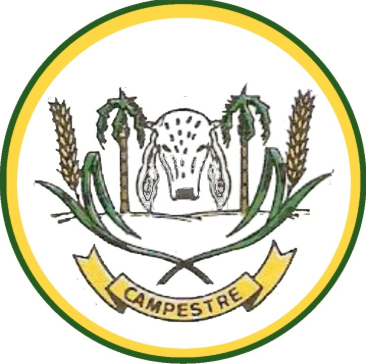
- Flag Coat of arms

- Location in Goiás state

- Location in Brazil
- Coordinates: 16°45′19″S 49°41′14″W
- Country: Brazil
- Region: Central-West
- State: Goiás
- Microregion: Vale do Rio dos Bois

Area
  - Total: 274.7 km^{2} (106.1 sq mi)
- Elevation: 651 m (2,136 ft)

Population (2020)
  - Total: 3,649
  - Density: 13.28/km^{2} (34.40/sq mi)
- Time zone: UTC−3 (BRT)
- Postal code: 75385-000

Campestre de Goiás is a municipality in central Goiás state, Brazil.

== Location ==
There are municipal boundaries with:

- north: Santa Bárbara de Goiás
- south: Guapó
- east: Trindade
- west: Palmeiras de Goiás

Campestre is 56 kilometres west of the state capital, Goiânia and 26 kilometers west of Trindade. Connections are made by GO-060 / Trindade / GO-050.

== Demographic and Political Data ==
- Population density in 2007: 12.46 inhabitants/km^{2}
- Population growth rate 2000-2007: 1.07.%
- Population in 1980: 2,459
- Population in 1991: 2,316
- Urban population in 2007: 2,276
- Rural population in 2007: 1,135
- Eligible voters in 2007: 2,635
- City government in 2005: mayor (Selma do Socorro Lemes Manzi), vice-mayor (Roberto José da Costa), and 09 councilmembers

== The economy ==
The economy is based on cattle raising, agriculture, and small retail and transformation units.

- Industrial units: 08 (2007)
- Retail units: 18
- Automobiles: 177 in 2007

Animal raising in 2006

- cattle: 30,500 head
- dairy cows: 6,600

Agricultural information 2006

- Number of farms: 260
- Total farm area: 24,226
- Planted area: 1,550 ha.
- Area of natural pasture: 17,162
- Workers in agriculture: 850
- Area of rice: 850 ha.
- Area of corn: 1,400 ha.

== Health in 2007 ==
- infant mortality rate in 2000: 25.29
- public health clinics: 01
- hospitals: none

== Education in 2006 ==
- literacy rate in 2000: 81.0%
- schools: 03
- classrooms: 18
- teachers: 54
- students: 868
- higher education: none
- Ranking on the Human Development Index: 0.715
- State ranking: 189 (out of 242 municipalities)
- National ranking: 2,732 (out of 5,507 municipalities)

== History ==
Campestre de Goiás began in 1949 when Dimas and Antônio Viera settled with their families along the banks of the Córrego Campestre. In 1963 it was raised to a district of Trindade, and in the same year was dismembered to create a new municipality.

== See also ==
- List of municipalities in Goiás
- Microregions of Goiás
