= Palmeiras de Goiás =

- Municipality
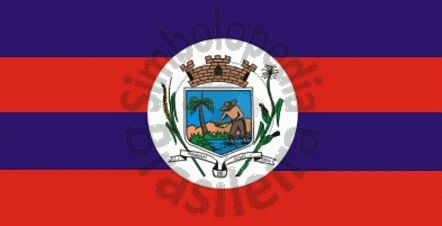
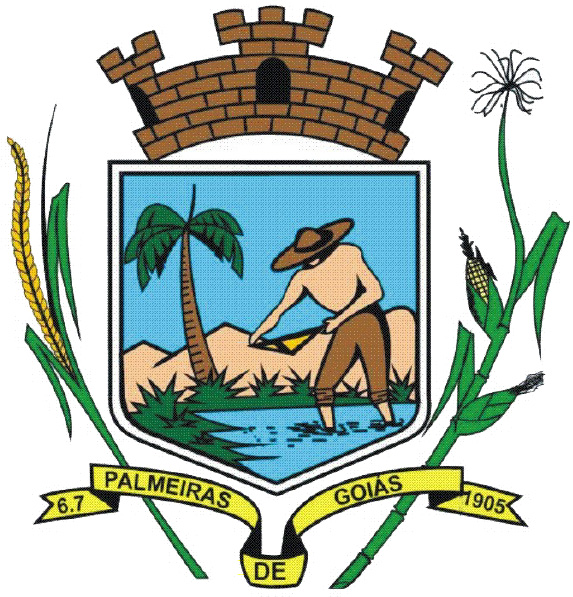
- Flag Coat of arms

- Location in Goiás state

- Location in Brazil
- Coordinates: 16°47′36″S 49°53′7″W
- Country: Brazil
- Region: Central-West
- State: Goiás
- Microregion: Vale do Rio dos Bois

Area
  - Total: 1,539.6 km^{2} (594.4 sq mi)
- Elevation: 600 m (2,000 ft)

Population (2020)
  - Total: 29,392
  - Density: 19.091/km^{2} (49.445/sq mi)
- Time zone: UTC−3 (BRT)
- Postal code: 76190-000
- Website: palmeirasdegoias.go.gov.br

Palmeiras de Goiás is a municipality in southeastern Goiás state, Brazil.

== Location ==
Palmeiras de Goiás is located in the statistical micro-region of Vale do Rio dos Bois at a distance of 88 kilometers from the state capital, Goiânia. It is 26 kilometers from Cezarina and the important BR-060 highway. Connections with Goiânia are made by GO-060 / Trindade / GO-050 / Campestre de Goiás / GO-156. A mid-air explosion led a plane to crash near Palmeiras de Goiás.

Neighboring municipalities are:

- North: Nazário and Santa Bárbara de Goiás
- South: Indiara
- East: Campestre de Goiás
- West: Palminópolis

== Political Information ==
In January 2005 the Mayor was Alberane Marques. There were 9 members on the city council and 16,133 eligible voters in December 2007.

== Demographic Information ==
In 2007 the population density was 13.77 inhabitants/km^{2}. In 2007 there were 16,763 people living in the urban area and 4,436 people living in the rural area. The population has decreased by about 3,000 people since 1980.

== Economic Information ==
The main economic activity is cattle raising. The cultivated area is approximately 1,500 km^{2}. The main products grown are corn, rice, cotton, soybeans, beans, tomato, oranges, and guava. There are some small industries producing cotton byproducts, clothing, and furniture. In 2007 there were 38 industrial units and 206 commercial units. There was 1 meat-packing plant—Indústria e Comércio de Carnes Minerva Ltda.--and 1 dairy—Coop. Agropecuária Mista de Palmeiras Ltda. There were 3 financial institutions: Banco do Brasil S.A. - Banco Itaú S.A. - CEF.

In 2005 the economic sectors employing most workers were: transformation industries—1,306 workers; construction—63 workers; commerce—349 workers; and public administration—457 workers.

In 2007 there were 2,576 automobiles and pickups, which gave a ratio of 8 inhabitants for each motor vehicle.

In 2006 there were 147,550 head of cattle. The main agricultural products were cotton (1,500 hectares), rice, bananas, rubber, sugarcane, manioc, guava, oranges, corn (3,300 hectares), soybeans (8,000 hectares), and tomatoes.

- Number of farms: 1,296
- Farm area: 136,659 ha.
- Planted area: 19,250 ha.
- Area of natural pasture: 92,638
- Persons employed in agriculture: 3,500

== Health and education ==
In 2007 there were 2 hospitals with 48 beds and 6 ambulatory health clinics. In 2000 the infant mortality rate was 15.54—below the national average of 33.0.

In 2006 the school system had 16 schools and 5,410 students. In 2000 the adult literacy rate was 87.7%--above the national average of 86.4%. The Universidade Estadual de Goiás maintains a campus in the city and there were 336 students enrolled in 2003.

Ranking on the Municipal Human Development Index

- Life expectancy: 72.6
- School attendance rate: 0.796
- MHDI: 0.760
- State ranking: 55 (out of 242 municipalities)
- National ranking: 1.600 (out of 5,507 municipalities)

Data are from 2000

For a complete list see Frigoletto.com

== See also ==
- List of municipalities in Goiás
- Microregions of Goiás
