= Cezarina =

- Municipality
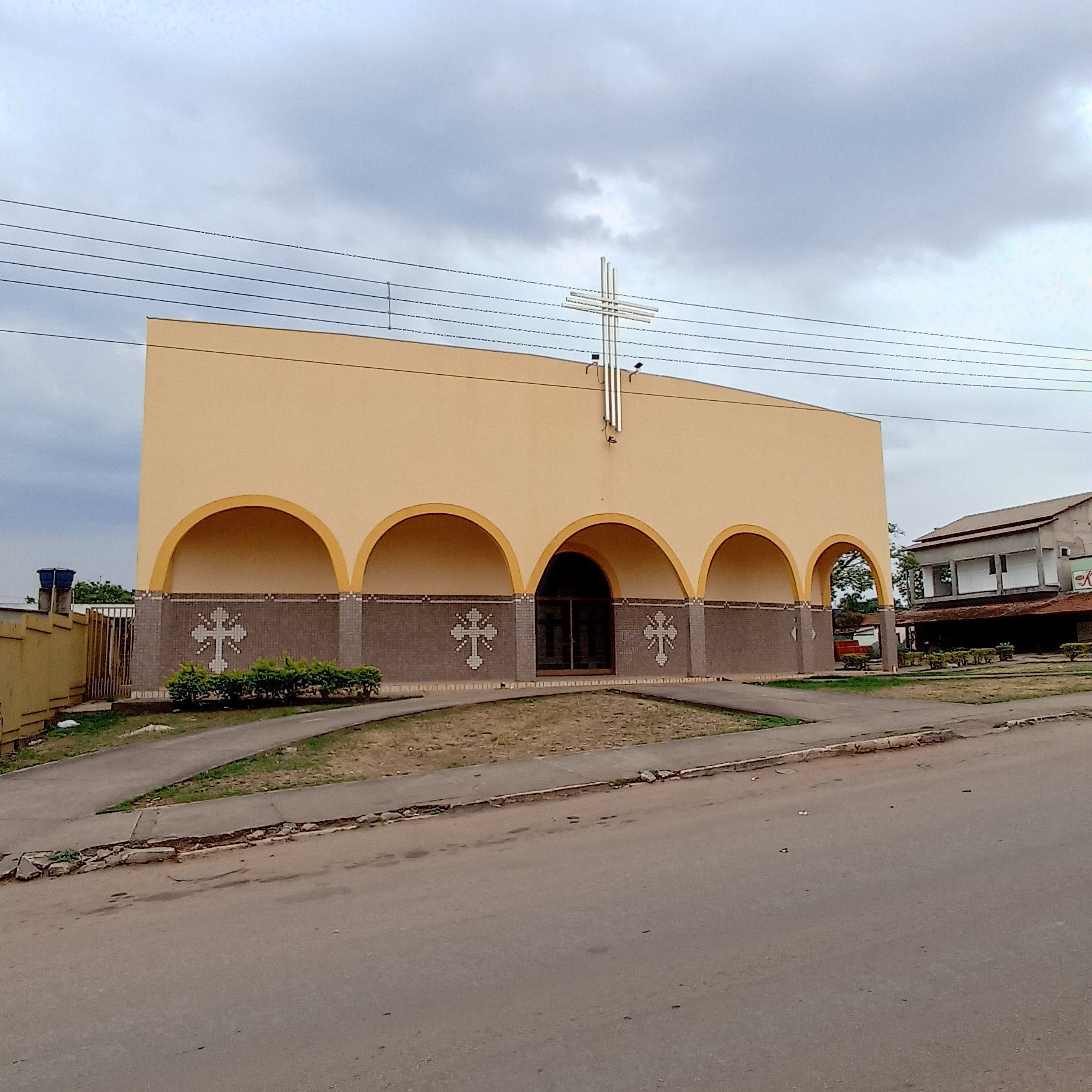

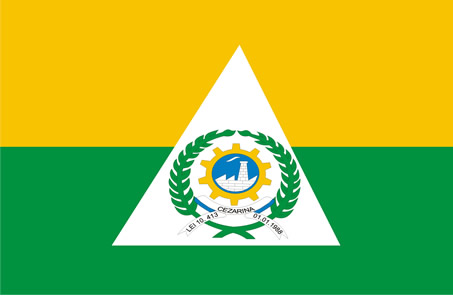
- Flag

- Location in Goiás state

- Location in Brazil
- Coordinates: 16°58′15″S 49°45′58″W
- Country: Brazil
- Region: Central-West
- State: Goiás
- Microregion: Vale do Rio dos Bois

Area
  - Total: 417.2 km^{2} (161.1 sq mi)
- Elevation: 596 m (1,955 ft)

Population (2020)
  - Total: 8,703
  - Density: 20.86/km^{2} (54.03/sq mi)
- Time zone: UTC−3 (BRT)
- Postal code: 76195-000
- Website: cezarina.go.gov.br

Cezarina is a municipality in central Goiás state, Brazil.

== Location and communications ==
Cezarina belongs to the Vale do Rio dos Bois statistical micro-region. It has municipal boundaries with:

- north: Palmeiras de Goiás
- south: Edealina
- east: Varjão
- west: Indiara

Cezarina is located 73 kilometers southwest of the state capital, Goiânia. It is on the BR-060 highway, which connects Brasília to Jataí in southwestern Goiás.

Important rivers are the Rio dos Bois, which flows north-south to join the Paranaíba.

== Demographic and political data ==
- Population density in 2007: 17.704 inhabitants/km^{2}
- Population growth rate 2000/2007: 1.761.%
- Urban population in 2007: 5,127
- Rural population in 2007: 2,234
- Eligible voters in 2007: 6,724
- City government in 2005: Mayor (Prefeito)--Adinilso Sirico, Vice-mayor (Vice-Prefeito)--Artur Franco de Almeida Filho, City council (Vereadores): 09

== Economy ==
The economy was based on cattle raising, agriculture, small transformation industries, meat packing, and dairies. There were 38,000 head of cattle in 2006.

- Industrial units: 22 (2007)
- Retail units: 78 (2007)
- Financial institutions: Banco Itaú S.A (2007)
- Packing house: Persa Indústria e Comércio de Carnes e Derivados Ltda
- Dairy: Laticínios Almeida Reis Ltda (2007)
- Automobiles: 760
- Pickup trucks: 78
- Motorcycles: 404

Agricultural data

- Number of farms: 379
- Total area: 33,395
- Planted area: 2,150 ha.
- Area of natural pasture: 25,655
- Workers in agriculture: 1,010

== Health and education ==
- Infant mortality rate: 25.29 in 1,000 live births (2000)
- Hospitals: 01 with 28 beds (2007)
- Public health clinics (SUS): 05 (2003)
- Literacy rate: 79.1% in 2000
- Schools: 06 with 2,171 students (2006)
- Higher education: none in June 2005

== History ==
Cezarina began in 1960, with the construction of the BR-060 highway. At that time the rancher, João Argemiro Cezar decided to donate his lands, where the center of the town is now located. He hired Agil José da Rocha to measure the lands, granting him a free lot. Agil José built a gasoline station on the edge of the highway, which became the first building in Cezarina. Little by little the town began to grow. The name "Cezarina" was chosen because of its founder, João Cezar. In 1988 it became a city.

Ranking on the Municipal Human Development Index

- MHDI: 0.747
- State ranking: 85 (out of 242 municipalities in 2000)
- National ranking: 1,976 (out of 5,507 municipalities in 2000)

== See also ==
- List of municipalities in Goiás
- Microregions of Goiás
