= Aragoiânia =

- Municipality
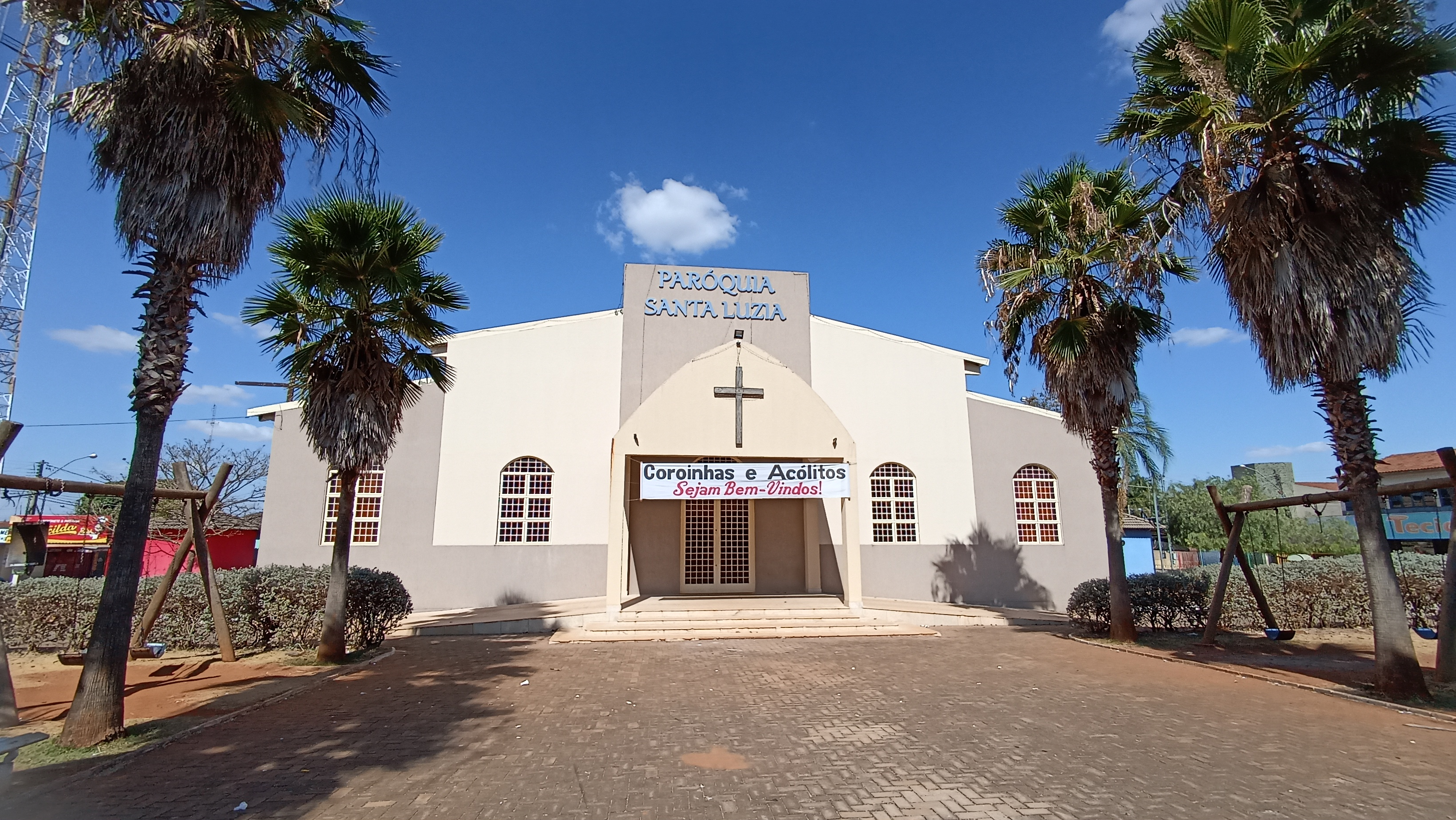

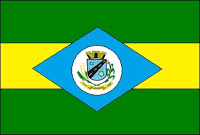
- Flag Coat of arms

- Location in Goiás state

- Location in Brazil
- Coordinates: 16°54′51″S 49°27′09″W
- Country: Brazil
- Region: Central-West
- State: Goiás
- Microregion: Goiânia Microregion

Area
  - Total: 290.1 km^{2} (112.0 sq mi)
- Elevation: 859 m (2,818 ft)

Population (2020)
  - Total: 10,496
  - Density: 36.18/km^{2} (93.71/sq mi)
- Time zone: UTC−3 (BRT)
- Postal code: 75360-000

Aragoiânia is a municipality in central Goiás state, Brazil. The population was 10,496 (2020 estimate) in a total area of 219.5 km^{2}.

Aragoiânia is 42 km. from the state capital, Goiânia, and is linked by highway GO-040. There are also three highways connection the town with Varjão, Cromínia, Hidrolândia, and Guapó. It is located in the Goiânia Microregion, at an elevation of 800 meters above sea level. The climate is moist tropical with an average annual temperature of 28 °C.

== Demographic and political data ==
- Population density: 33.11 inhabitants/km^{2} (2007)
- Population growth rate 2000/2007: 1.73%
- Population in 1980: 3,707
- Population in 1991: 4,910
- Urban population in 2007: 5,146
- Rural population in 2007: 2,097 (in 1980 the rural population surpassed the urban population)
- Eligible voters: 5,62 (2007)
- City government in 2013: mayor old (Neovagina), vice-mayor (Sara), and 9 councilmembers

== History ==
The reason for European settlement here was the building of a chapel in honor of Santa Luzia. The first name was Malhador (cattle tamer), because of the existence of a man with that profession. Later the name was changed to Biscoito Duro (Hard Cookie), because of a popular sweet sought after in the local general store. In 1958 it became a district of Guapó with the name Aragoiânia, a combination of Araguaia and Goiânia. It was dismembered from Guapó and Hidrolândia in 1958 to become a municipality.

== Economy ==
The main economic activity is the industrialization of sweets. There are also industries for transforming manioc, sugarcane and cow leather. There is a slaughterhouse and a vigorous commerce in meat for the nearby capital. On weekends the population triples due to the proximity of weekend farms owned by urban dwellers in Goiânia.

The main agricultural products are:

- cattle raising: 23,780 head (5,710 dairy cows)
- Modest production of bananas, coffee, and citrus fruits
- Modest planted areas of corn, rice, manioc, and beans

(IBGE 2007)

Main economic activities:

- transformation industries: 13 units
- commerce: 52 units
- public administration
- education and health

(IBGE 2007)

There were no financial institutions reported in 2007.

== Health and education ==
- Hospitals: 1, with 16 beds
- Public doctors, nurses, and dentists: 12 / 2 / 3
- There were 7 schools with 2,172 students (2007)
- Infant mortality rate (per 1000 live births): 1990–28.50; 2000–15.72
- Literacy rate: 1991–77.5; 2000–85.4

Human Development Index: 0.759

- State ranking: 59 (out of 242 municipalities)
- National ranking: 1,627 (out of 5,507 municipalities)

== See also ==
- List of municipalities in Goiás
