= Quirinópolis =

- Municipality
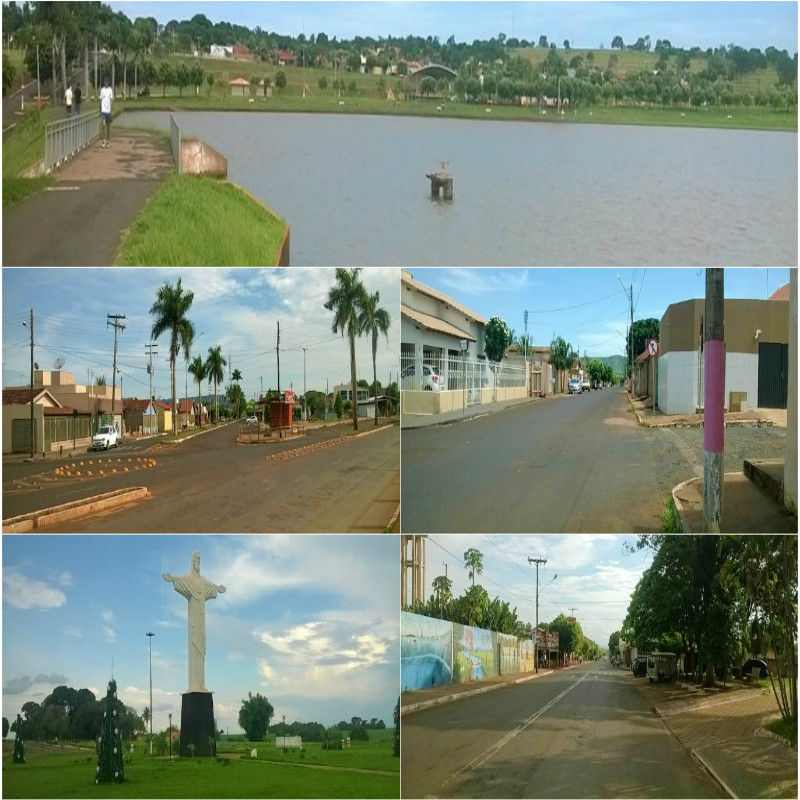
- View of Quirinópolis

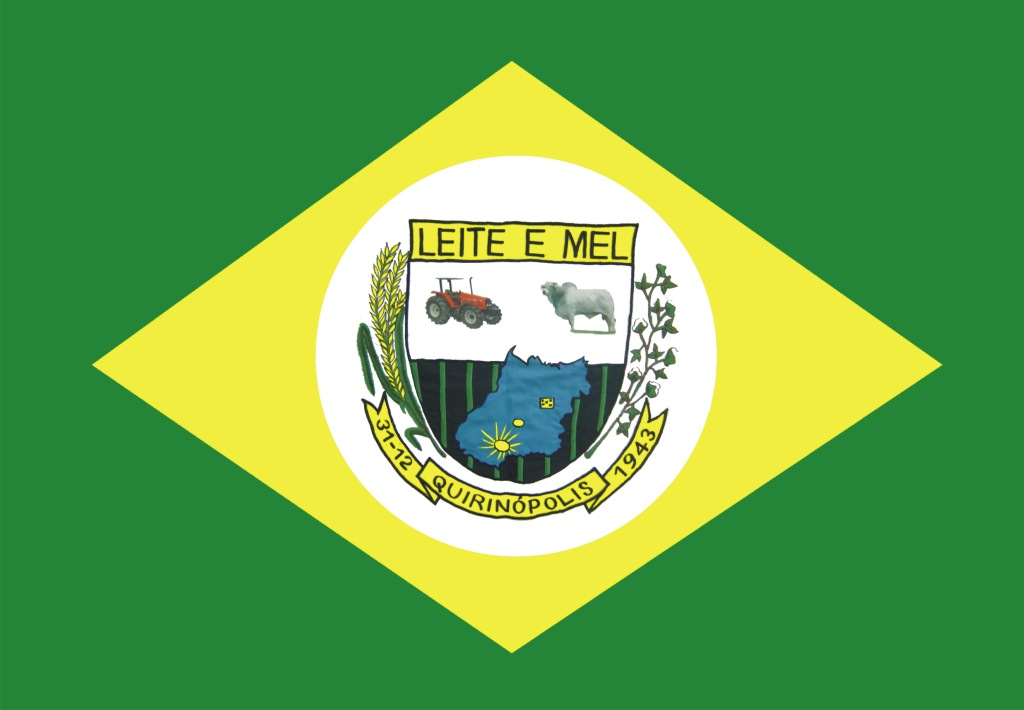
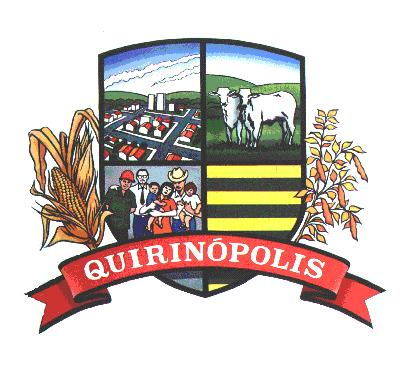
- Flag Coat of arms

- Location in Goiás state

- Location in Brazil
- Coordinates: 18°26′53″S 50°26′47″W
- Country: Brazil
- Region: Central-West
- State: Goiás
- Microregion: Quirinópolis Microregion

Area
  - Total: 3,780.22002 km^{2} (1,459.55111 sq mi)
- Elevation: 541 m (1,775 ft)

Population (2020)
  - Total: 50,701
  - Density: 13.412/km^{2} (34.737/sq mi)
- Time zone: UTC−3 (BRT)
- Postal code: 75860-000
- Website: www.quirinopolis.go.gov.br

Quirinópolis is a municipality in southern Goiás state, Brazil. It is a large producer of cattle and agricultural products.

== Location ==
Quirinópolis is the seat of the Quirinópolis Microregion. It forms boundaries with Gouvelândia (west), Cachoeira Alta (east) and Paranaiguara (south). It is connected to the main regions of the country by GO-164, which connects to BR-452 and GO-206, which in turn connects to BR-384. It is 290 kilometers from the state capital, Goiânia, to which it is connected by BR-060 via Abadia de Goiás, Guapó, Indiara, Acreúna, GO-164, and Santa Helena de Goiás. See Sepin

The Rio Preto, a tributary of the Paranaíba, flows through the city. The important São Simão Dam is located a short distance to the south. The reservoir forms the boundary between the states of Goiás and Minas Gerais.

== Demographics ==
- Population density in 2007: 10.07 inhabitants/km^{2}
- Population growth rate 1996–2007: 0.65.%
- Total population in 2007: 38,064
- Total population in 1980: 36,236
- Urban population in 2007: 33,746
- Rural population in 2007: 4,318
- Population change: the population has increased by about 1,800 inhabitants since 1980.

== Economy ==
The economy is based on agriculture, cattle raising, services, public administration, and small transformation industries. Natural and artificial pastures make up most of the land, on which there is large-scale cattle raising for beef and milk. Quirinópolis is the third largest producer of beef in the state. There are also small industries in metallurgy, coffee processing, milk products, and soft drinks. There were 356,000 head of cattle in 2006, one of the largest in the state. Milk production is 130,000 liters a day, again one of the largest in the state. See Prefeitura de Quirinópolis

- Industrial establishments: 75
- Retail commercial establishments: 413
- Bank agencies: Banco do Brasil S.A. - BRADESCO S.A. - Banco Itaú S.A. - CEF - HSBC Bank Brasil S.A.-Banco Multiplo (August 2007)
- Dairies: - - Coop. Mista de Produtos Rurais do Vale do Paranaíba Ltda. - Coop. dos Prod. Rurais de Quirinópolis e Região (22/05/2006)
- Meat packing plant: Frigosuper Comércio de Carnes Ltda (22/05/2006)
- Alcohol distillery: Usina São João

Main agricultural products in ha.(2006)

- rice: 200
- sugarcane: 9,000
- manioc: 60
- corn: 6,000
- soybeans: 10,000
- sorghum: 3,000

Farm Data (2006)in ha.

- Number of farms: 1,274
- Total area: 302,917
- Area of permanent crops: n/a
- Area of perennial crops: 31,052
- Area of natural pasture: 205,075
- Persons dependent on farming: 5,100
- Farms with tractors: 397
- Number of tractors: 620 IBGE

== Education and Health ==
There were 29 schools including a campus of the State University of Goiás (1,369 students in 2003). The adult literacy rate was 87.1% (2000) (national average was 86.4%). There were 04 hospitals with 126 beds (2007). The infant mortality rate was 16.8 (2000) (national average was 33.0).

- Municipal Human Development Index: 0.780 See Frigoletto

== Tourism ==
The streets are lined with trees and there are many squares with flowers, lawns, and ornamental plants. The town has a small airfield, which is being expanded to make a regional airport. The historical space has been well preserved and there is a cultural center, the second largest in the state. Lago do Sol Poente is a lake that attracts many visitors who can practice jet ski and motocross. Cachoeira Sete Ilhas, in the Rio São Francisco, is a waterfall with seven islands that contain exuberant tropical vegetation. There are many other small waterfalls, lakes, small beaches and natural swimming pools that make the region a sought-after tourist destination in the state.

== History ==
The written European history of Quirinópolis begins in 1832 with the arrival of João Cristóstomo de Oliveira, who was from Minas Gerais. He took over a vast area of land and tried to keep anyone else from settling down. Nevertheless, some years later in 1860 a village was established with the name Abadia do Parnaíba. In 1879 the name was changed to Nossa Senhora da Abadia, later Rio Verde, and finally Quirinópolis, honoring the builder of the first chapel, José Quirino Cardoso. In 1943 it became a municipality.

== See also ==
- List of municipalities in Goiás
- Microregions of Goiás
