= Caçu =

- Municipality
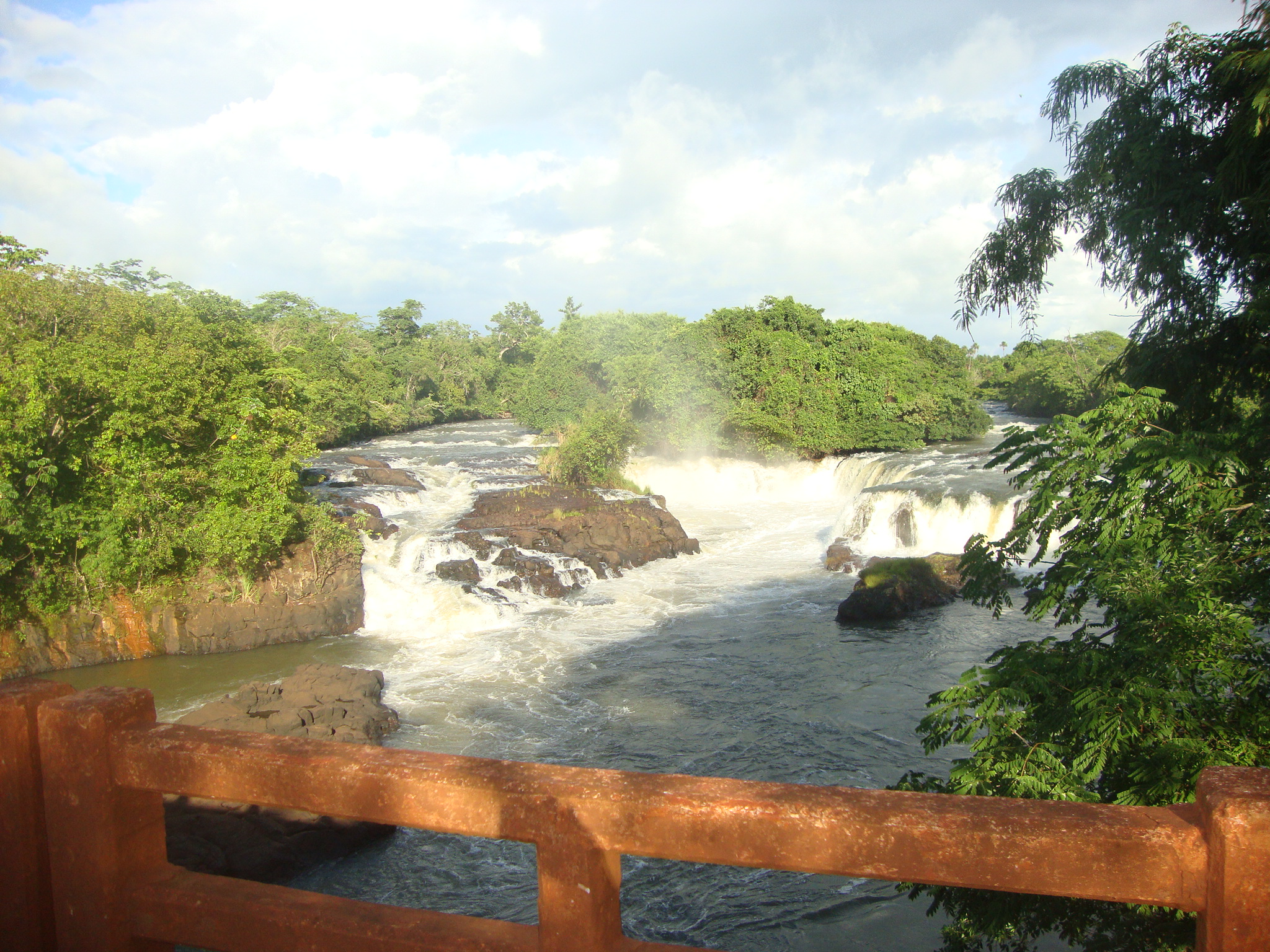

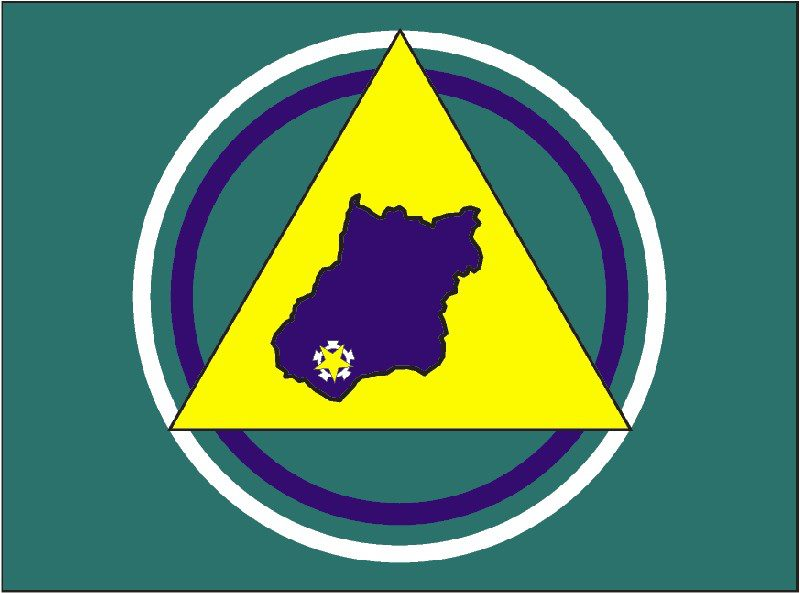
- Flag

- Location in Goiás state

- Location in Brazil
- Coordinates: 18°33′47″S 51°07′29″W
- Country: Brazil
- Region: Central-West
- State: Goiás
- Microregion: Quirinópolis Microregion

Area
  - Total: 2,257.8 km^{2} (871.7 sq mi)
- Elevation: 469 m (1,539 ft)

Population (2020)
  - Total: 16,270
  - Density: 7.206/km^{2} (18.66/sq mi)
- Time zone: UTC−3 (BRT)
- Postal code: 75813-000

Caçu is a municipality in southwest Goiás state, Brazil.

== Location ==
Caçu is part of the Quirinópolis Microregion. It is located 330 kilometers from the state capital of Goiânia and is crossed by highway GO-206, which links the city with Quirinópolis. It is almost directly south of Rio Verde, 99 km away.

Highway connections from Goiânia are by BR-060 / Guapó / Indiara / Acreúna / Rio Verde / GO-174/GO-422 / Aparecida do Rio Doce / BR-364/GO-206. See Sepin

== Geography ==
The relief of the municipality is made up of a plateau and several hills. Belonging to the Paranaíba River system, it is crossed by the Claro, Verdinho, and the Paranaíba itself. The climate is tropical with two well-defined seasons—the dry season, from May to the end of September, and the rainy season, from September to April.

The temperature varies between 18 °C and 35 °C, with an average of 25 °C; in the months of June and July the minimum temperature can fall to 0 °C, although this is rare.

== Demographics ==
- Population density in 2007: 4.84 inhabitants/km^{2}
- Population growth rate 1996/2007: 0.41.%
- Total population in 2007: 10,892
- Total population in 1980: 10,739
- Urban population in 2007: 6,543
- Rural population in 2007: 2,349
- Urban population in 2022: 13,774
- Population change: the population has increased by about 150 inhabitants since 1980.

== The economy ==
The economy is based on cattle raising and soybean growing. The region had 211,000 head of cattle including 15,900 milking cows (2006). The extensive cattle raising and mechanized agriculture provide few jobs for the local population and the population density is sparse.

- Industrial units: 15
- Retail commercial units: 161
- Dairies: Laticínios Itarumã e Comércio Ltda., Coop. Agrop. dos Prod. Rurais de Iturama. (22/05/2006)
- Financial institutions: Banco do Brasil S.A., BRADESCO S.A. (August/2007)

Farm Data (2006)in ha.

- Number of farms: 736
- Total area: 159,640
- Area of permanent crops: 132
- Area of perennial crops: 1,457
- Area of natural pasture: 123,220
- Persons dependent on farming: 2,100
- Farms with tractors: 171 IBGE
- Corn: 300 ha.
- Rice: 250 ha.
- Soybeans: 700 ha.

== Health and education ==
- Infant mortality rate in 2000: 16.89
- Hospitals (2007): 01 with 29 beds
- Literacy rate in 2000: 86.8
- Schools: 13
- Enrollment: 2,771
- Higher education: none in 2006

Ranking on the Municipal Human Development Index: 0.783

- State ranking: 25 (out of 242 municipalities)
- National ranking: 972 (out of 5,507 municipalities) Frigoletto

== History ==
The region was first settled by Europeans in 1858 when two brothers, Pedro and Paulo de Sequeira, coming from Minas Gerais established themselves on the right bank of the Rio Claro. Twenty-six years later Manuel José de Castro, with other families, started the first cattle ranch called Caçu, because of the great quantity of liquorice (alcaçuz), a medicinal plant, growing in the region. The cattle ranch became a village in 1915 with the construction of a chapel. The first name was Água Fria, being built on the banks of the stream with that name. In 1924 it became a district of Jataí with the name of Caçu, achieving its municipal independence in 1953.

== See also ==
- List of municipalities in Goiás
