= Indiara =

- Municipality
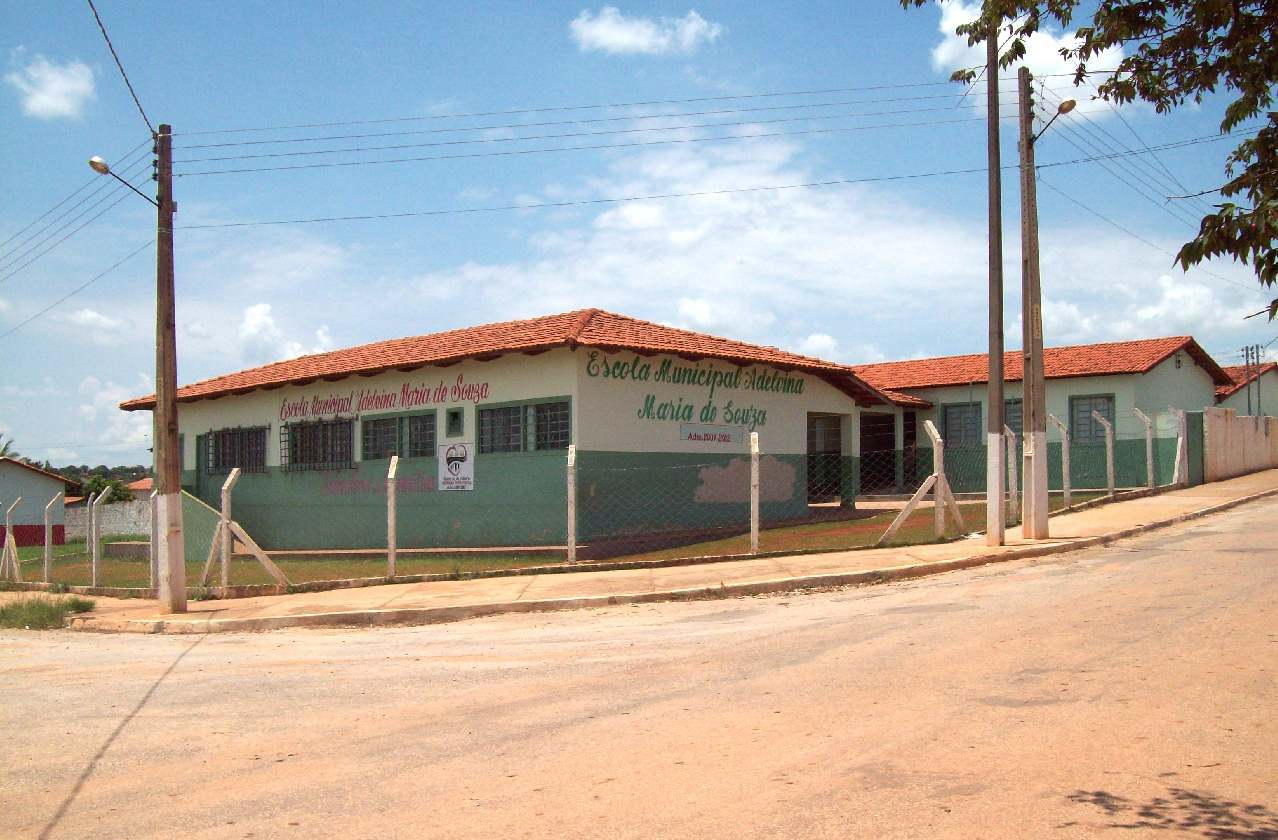

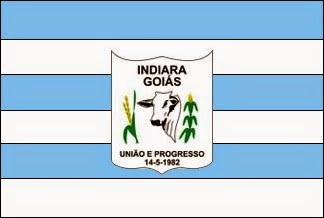
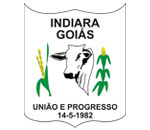
- Flag Coat of arms

- Location in Goiás state

- Location in Brazil
- Coordinates: 17°08′30″S 49°59′41″W
- Country: Brazil
- Region: Central-West
- State: Goiás
- Microregion: Vale do Rio dos Bois

Area
  - Total: 956.4 km^{2} (369.3 sq mi)
- Elevation: 550 m (1,800 ft)

Population (2020)
  - Total: 15,787
  - Density: 16.51/km^{2} (42.75/sq mi)
- Time zone: UTC−3 (BRT)
- Postal code: 75955-000

Indiara is a city and municipality in central-south Goiás state, Brazil. Indiara is a large producer of soybeans and cotton.

== Location ==
Indiara is in the Vale do Rio dos Bois and has municipal boundaries with:

- north: Palmeiras de Goiás
- south: Edéia
- east: Cezarina
- west: Jandaia and Acreúna

Indiara is 102 kilometers (southwest) from the state capital, Goiânia and is on the edge of highway BR-060 (passing through Guapó and Cezarina).

== Political data ==
- Eligible voters: 9,310 (12/2007)
- Mayor: José Vilmar da Fonseca (January 2005)
- Vice-mayor: Antônio Telesforo de Almeida
- Councilmembers: 9

== Demographic data ==
- Population density: 13.28 inhabitants/km^{2} (2007)
- Population growth rate 2000/2007: 1.04%
- Urban population in 2007: 10,408
- Rural population in 2007: 2,295

=== Ranking on the municipal Human Development Index, 2000 ===
- Municipal Human Development Index MHDI: 0.731
- State ranking: 143 (out of 242 municipalities)
- National ranking: 2,414 (out of 5,507 municipalities)

== Economy ==
The economy is based on cattle raising and agriculture. There are plantations of corn, rice, and soybeans. There are several small industries producing furniture, lumber, and clothes.

=== Economic data for 2007 ===
- Industrial units: 20
- Retail commercial units: 123
- Banking institutions: Banco do Brasil S.A.
- Dairies: Cooperativa Mista dos Prod. de Leite de Morrinhos Ltda.
- Automobiles: 1,114 in 2007

=== Main agricultural activities ===
- Cattle raising: 75,140 head (2006)
- Agriculture: cotton, rice, sugarcane (1,125 hectares), oranges, corn (4,000 hectares), soybeans (7,000 hectares), and tomatoes.
- Number of farms: 562
- Agricultural area: 83,013
- Planted area: 19,300
- Area in natural pasture: 45,292
- Workers in agriculture: 1,800

== Education and health ==
- Literacy rate: 85.5% (2000)
- Infant mortality rate: 25.29 in 1,000 live births (2000)
- Schools: 13 (2006)
- Students: 3,428
- Hospitals: 3 (02/2007)
- Walk-in clinics: 1

== History ==
The town began with the construction of the highway between Goiânia and Cuiabá, Mato Grosso in 1958. First came a restaurant, a "churrascaria" (steakhouse), and then other people began to arrive. There was no donation of lands; the landowners created the lots themselves. The town name comes from a coconut tree, the indaiá, which grows nearby. Indiara belonged to three municipalities: Edéia, Jandaia, and Palmeira de Goiás and was dismembered to create a district and a municipality in 1983.

== See also ==
- List of municipalities in Goiás
- Microregions of Goiás
