= Portelândia =

- Municipality
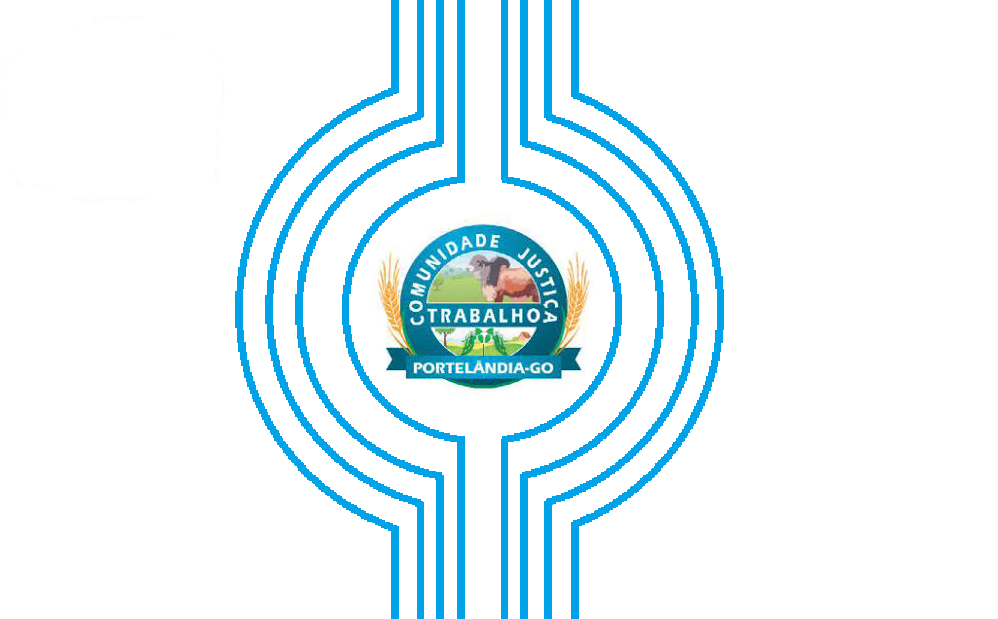
- Flag

- Location in Goiás state

- Location in Brazil
- Coordinates: 17°21′56″S 52°40′19″W
- Country: Brazil
- Region: Central-West
- State: Goiás
- Microregion: Sudoeste de Goiás

Area
  - Total: 552.4 km^{2} (213.3 sq mi)
- Elevation: 858 m (2,815 ft)

Population (2020)
  - Total: 4,022
  - Density: 7.281/km^{2} (18.86/sq mi)
- Time zone: UTC−3 (BRT)
- Postal code: 75835-000

Portelândia is a municipality enclave in southwestern Goiás state, Brazil. It is a prosperous community with a large production of soybeans.

== Geographical information ==
Portelândia is located in the extreme west of the state, 65,5 kilometers east of the Araguaia River and the boundary with the state of Mato Grosso. The region is south of the Serra do Caiapó.

The distance to the state capital, Goiânia, is 454 km. Highway connections are made by BR-060 / Abadia de Goiás / Guapó / Indiara / Acreúna / Rio Verde / BR-364 / Jataí / Mineiros / GO-194. Sepin

Municipal boundaries are with Mineiros, which surrounds it on all sides.

== History ==
Before 1933 the area where Portelândia now lies was almost inhabited with a few cattle ranches. It belonged to the municipality of Jataí. In 1933 Ludugerio Martins de Souza arrived with his wife and 8 children and built a residence on the banks of the Córrego da Porteira in lands belonging to the Fazenda Flores. Here Ludugerio set up a brick kiln to sell bricks to the local ranchers. Soon Walfredo Ivo de Oliveira saw the possibilities of starting a settlement in the area and he built the first solid building as a general store to sell to the passing muleteers. He began to buy land and the settlement began to grow. It was called Córrego da Porteira, after the stream. In 1938 it became part of Mineiros. In 1948 the first school was built, followed by a church in 1954. In 1956 a highway BR-31 reached the town and lots were sold to new settlers. In 1963 Portelândia became a municipality, the name having its origin int Porteira, the name of the stream passing nearby.

== Political and Demographic information ==
- Mayor: Valdineis Carrijo Rodrigues (January 2005)
- Eligible voters: 2,884 (2007)
- City council: 9 members
- Population density: 6.0 inhabitants/km^{2} (2007)
- Urban population: 2,715(2007)
- Rural population: 595 (2007)
- Geometric population increase: -1.56%

== Economic information ==
The economy is based on agriculture, cattle raising, services, public administration, and small transformation industries.

- Industrial units: 4 (2007), employing 35 people in 2005
- Commercial units: 39 (2007), employing 147 people in 2005
- Bank agencies: Banco do Brasil S.A (June 2007)
- Dairies: - Portelat Ind. e Com. de Laticínios Ltda. - Marques Dourado Indústria e Comércio Ltda (22/05/2006)
- Motor vehicles: 219 automobiles (2007)
- Cattle herd: 21,500 head (2006)
- Dairy cows: 4,500 (2006)
- Main crops (2006): cotton, rice, sunflowers, soybeans (24,300 hectares), sorghum (2,000 hectares), and corn (3,800 hectares).

== Education (2006) ==
- Schools: 4 with 1,326 students
- Middle school enrollment: 170 students
- Higher education: none
- Adult literacy rate: 86.3% (2000) (national average was 86.4%)

== Health (2007) ==
- Hospitals: 1
- Hospital beds: 22
- Ambulatory clinics: 2
- Doctors, nurses, dentists: 7, 2, 1 (2002)
- Infant mortality rate: 12.1 (2000) (national average was 33.0).

Municipal Human Development Index

- MHDI: 0.790
- Ranking in the state: 29 out of 242 municipalities
- National ranking: 1044 out of 5507 municipalities

Data are from 2000

For the complete list see Frigoletto.com

== See also ==
- List of municipalities in Goiás
- Microregions of Goiás
