= Chapadão do Céu =

- Municipality
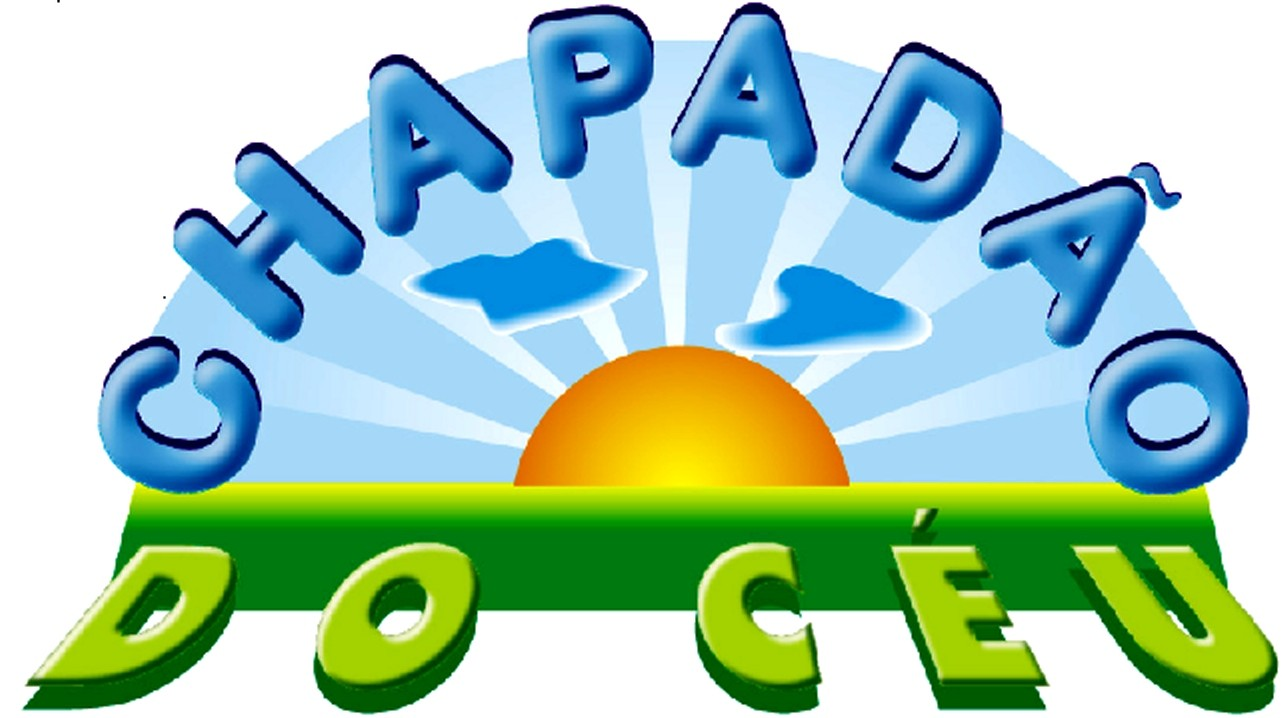
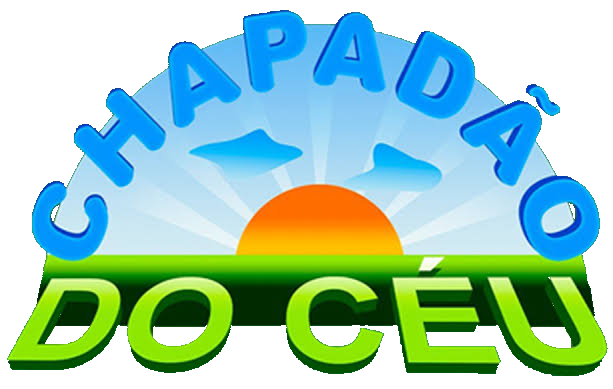
- Flag Seal

- Location in Goiás state

- Location in Brazil
- Coordinates: 18°23′06″S 52°37′32″W
- Country: Brazil
- Region: Central-West
- State: Goiás
- Microregion: Sudoeste de Goiás Microregion

Area
  - Total: 2,354.8 km^{2} (909.2 sq mi)
- Elevation: 840 m (2,760 ft)

Population (2020)
  - Total: 10,486
  - Density: 4.4530/km^{2} (11.533/sq mi)
- Time zone: UTC−3 (BRT)
- Postal code: 75828-000
- Website: www.chapadaodoceu.go.gov.br

Chapadão do Céu is a municipality in southwestern Goiás state, Brazil. It is a large producer of grains (soybeans and corn) and has a high standard of living.

== Geographical Information ==
It is located on the dividing line between the states of Mato Grosso do Sul and Goiás. The distance to the state capital, Goiânia, is 467 km. Connecting highways are BR-060 / Guapó / Cezarina / Indiara / Acreúna / Rio Verde / Jataí / GO-050 (40 km unpaved road). Distances to other towns are: 50 km. to Chapadão do Sul; 109 km. to Mineiros; 106 km. to Jataí; 255 km. to Rio Verde; and 451 km. to Itumbiara.

Municipal boundaries are with:

- North: Serranópolis and Mineiros;
- West: Mineiros and Costa Rica (MS);
- South: Chapadão do Sul (MS);
- East: Aporé.

For a map see Chapadaodoceu

== Demographic and Political Data ==
- Population growth rate 1996/2000: 9.48%
- Population growth rate 2000/2007: 4.92%
- Mayor (Prefeito)--Eduardo Pagnocelli Peixoto
- Vice-mayor (Vice-Prefeito)--Paulo Rodrigues da Cunha
- City council (Vereadores): 09

== Economy ==
Despite the low fertility of the soil, the region has agricultural potential because of the flat land and abundance of water. There are plantations of soybeans, corn, and rice, which show good averages of productivity after soil correction, modern techniques, and the use of advanced machines and equipment are applied. In 2006 there were 126 agricultural installations with 56,140 hectares of planted area. Only 36 of these farms had cattle. Forty five of the farms had tractors.

Economic Activity

- Industrial units: 08 (2007)
- Retail units: 113
- Financial institutions: Banco do Brasil S.A.

Agricultural Production (2006)

- cattle: 19,000 head
- cotton: 6,945 hectares
- corn: 33,911 hectares
- soybeans: 101,946 hectares
- sorghum: 20,000 hectares

Data are from 2006 and can be found at IBGE

== Best quality of life in Goiás ==
Chapadão is becoming one of the state's biggest producers of soybeans and corn. It was also singled out in 2003 as having the highest ranking in the state of Goiás on the United Nations Human Development Index.chapadaodoceu The index was 0.834, ranking Chapadão 1 out of 242 municipalities in Goiás and 100 out of 5,507 municipalities in the country. All the water in the town is treated, all the children go to public school, and there is almost zero infant mortality. See Human Development Index

== Education and Health ==
- Literacy rate in 2000: 95.1% (the highest in the state)
- Schools: 07 (2006) with 1,987 students
- Infant mortality rate in 2000: 11.36 in 1,000 live births
- Hospitals: 01 with 14 beds (2007)
- Public health clinics: 04

== Climate and Tourism ==
Chapadão do Céu has about 32% of its total area in reserves, including the Parque Nacional das Emas, legal reserves (20% of rural properties) and permanent reserves (river banks, streams, and springs).

The climate is moist tropical with an average annual temperature between 19 °C and 37 °C. The relative air humidity is around 55%. The region is watered by the following rivers: Água Amarela, Aporé, Corrente, Formoso, Jacuba, Prata, Pratinha and Sucuriú. The municipality is the gateway to the largest preserved area of the cerrado bioma in the world: the Parque Nacional das Emas, with its rich variety of flowers, plants, animals, birds, and beautiful landscapes.

== See also ==
- List of municipalities in Goiás
- Microregions of Goiás
