= Santa Rita do Araguaia =

- Municipality
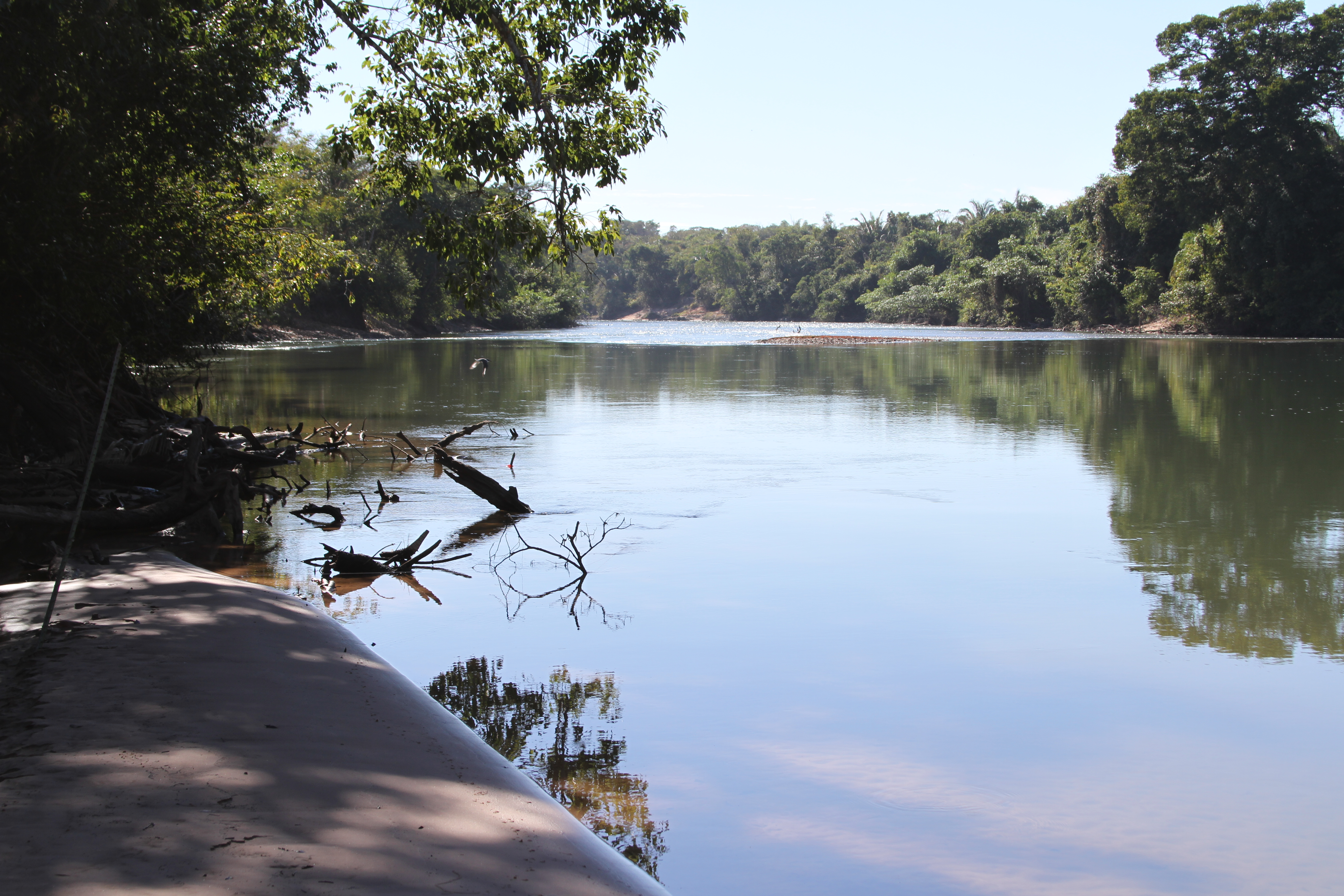

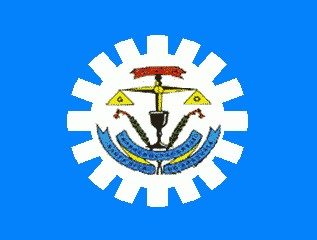
- Flag

- Location in Goiás state

- Location in Brazil
- Coordinates: 17°18′52″S 53°11′57″W
- Country: Brazil
- Region: Central-West
- State: Goiás
- Microregion: Sudoeste de Goiás

Area
  - Total: 1,361.7 km^{2} (525.8 sq mi)
- Elevation: 691 m (2,267 ft)

Population (2020)
  - Total: 8,935
  - Density: 6.562/km^{2} (16.99/sq mi)
- Time zone: UTC−3 (BRT)
- Postal code: 75840-000

Santa Rita do Araguaia is a municipality in southwestern Goiás state, Brazil.

== Location ==
Santa Rita is located on the Araguaia River and is connected to the state capital, Goiânia by highway BR-364. It is 91 kilometers west of regional center, Mineiros. The distance to state capital, Goiânia is 516 km. Highway connections are made from Goiânia by BR-060 / Abadia de Goiás / Guapó / Indiara / Acreúna / Rio Verde / Jataí / GO-050 / BR-364 / Mineiros / BR-384. Sepin

Municipal boundaries are with:

- north and west: Mato Grosso
- south and west: Mineiros

== History ==
The origin of Santa Rita do Araguaia, located on the right bank of the Rio Araguaia, opposite the city of Alto Araguaia in Mato Grosso, was the Araguaia ranch, bought in 1854 by José Manoel Vilela. He reserved a large area for a settlement called Santa Rita dos Impossíveis. Later the name was changed to Santa Rita do Araguaia. In 1911 it became a district in the municipality of Mineiros. In 1943 the name was changed to "Ivapé", an Indigenous word meaning "road of fruit". In 1953 the town became a municipality with its present name.

== Political and Demographic Information ==
- Mayor: Luzia Ferreira Costa e Santos (January 2005)
- City council: 09
- Eligible voters: 3,674 (2007)
- Population density: 4.31 inhabitants/km^{2} (2005)
- Urban population: 5,146 (2007)
- Rural population: 727 (2007)
- Geometric Growth Rate: 2.07% for 2000/2007

== Economic Information ==
The economy is based on subsistence agriculture, cattle raising, services, public administration, and small transformation industries.

- Industrial units: 2 (2007)
- Commercial units: 64 (2007)
- Financial institutions: 01 branch of Bradesco S.A. (May/2006)
- Automobiles: 653 (2007)
- Cattle herd: 53,500 head (4,900 milk cows)
- Main crops: rice, sugarcane, bananas, corn (3,550 hectares), and soybeans (5,000).

== Education (2006) and Health (2007) ==
- Schools: 5 with 1,737 students
- Higher education: none
- Adult literacy rate: 85.9% (2000) (national average was 86.4%)
- Hospitals: 0
- Hospital beds: 0
- Ambulatory clinics: 1
- Infant mortality rate: 20.02 (2000) (national average was 33.0)

Municipal Human Development Index

- MHDI: 0.756
- Ranking in the state: 65 out of 242 municipalities
- National ranking: 1706 out of 5507 municipalities

Data are from 2000

For the complete list see Frigoletto.com

== See also ==
- List of municipalities in Goiás
- Microregions of Goiás
