= Perolândia =

- Municipality
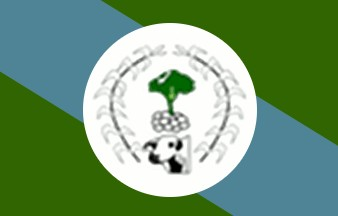
- Flag

- Location in Goiás state

- Location in Brazil
- Coordinates: 17°31′19″S 52°02′48″W
- Country: Brazil
- Region: Central-West
- State: Goiás
- Microregion: Sudoeste de Goiás

Area
  - Total: 1,029.6 km^{2} (397.5 sq mi)
- Elevation: 889 m (2,917 ft)

Population (2020)
  - Total: 3,143
  - Density: 3.053/km^{2} (7.906/sq mi)
- Time zone: UTC−3 (BRT)
- Postal code: 75823-000

Perolândia is a municipality in southwestern Goiás state, Brazil. It is a large producer of soybeans.

== Location and distances ==
Perolândia is located in the Sudoeste de Goiás Microregion north of the Rio Claro. There are paved road connections with Jataí, which lies to the southeast.

The distance to the state capital, Goiânia is 413 km. Highway connections are made by BR-060 / Abadia de Goiás / Guapó / Indiara / Rio Verde / Jataí / GO-050 / BR-364 / GO-516. Sepin

Municipal boundaries are with:

- north and west: Mineiros and Caiapônia
- south and east: Jataí

== Political information ==
- Mayor: Grete Elisa Balz Rocha - Cidadania (2021–2024)
- City council: 9
- Eligible voters: 3,027 (March 2022)

== Demographic information ==
- Population density: 2.87 inhabitants/km^{2} (2016)
- Urban population: 2,019 (2016)
- Rural population: 1,086 (2016)
- Population growth: +5.25% for 2010/2016

== Economic information ==
The economy is based on agriculture, cattle raising, services, public administration, and small transformation industries.

- Industrial units: 3 (2007)
- Commercial units: 40 (2007)
- Bank agencies: none
- Cattle herd: 27,000 head (2006)
- Dairy cows: 3,500 (2006)
- Main crops (2006): cotton (2,496 hectares), rice (900 hectares), bananas, coffee, beans, manioc, corn (5,800 hectares), sorghum (6,000 hectares), and soybeans (38,500 hectares). In 2006 there were 254 agricultural units with an area of 52,000 hectares, of which 12,000 hectares were farmland, 27,000 hectares were pasture, and 12,000 hectares were woodland. Around 800 workers were considered farm labor.

== Education (2006) ==
- Schools: 4
- Students: 997
- Middle school enrollment: 117 students
- Higher education: none
- Adult literacy rate: 85.4% (2000) (national average was 86.4%)

== Health (2007) ==
- Hospitals: 0
- Hospital beds: 0
- Ambulatory clinics: 1
- Infant mortality rate: 28.66 (2000) (national average was 33.0)

Ranking on the Municipal Human Development Index

- Life Expectancy: 67.2
- Adult Literacy Rate: .83
- School Attendance Rate: .78
- Monthly Per Capita Income: 211.00 Reais
- MHDI: 0.730
- Ranking in the state: 145 out of 242 municipalities
- National ranking: 2423 out of 5,507 municipalities

Data are from 2000

For the complete list see Frigoletto.com

== See also ==
- List of municipalities in Goiás
- Microregions of Goiás
