= Serranópolis =

- Municipality
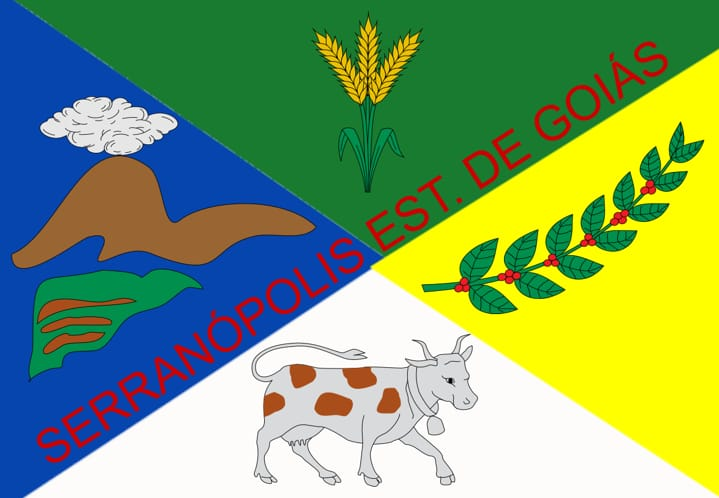
- Flag Coat of arms

- Location in Goiás state

- Location in Brazil
- Coordinates: 18°18′11″S 51°56′49″W
- Country: Brazil
- Region: Central-West
- State: Goiás
- Microregion: Sudoeste de Goiás

Area
  - Total: 5,526.5 km^{2} (2,133.8 sq mi)
- Elevation: 750 m (2,460 ft)

Population (2020)
  - Total: 8,642
  - Density: 1.564/km^{2} (4.050/sq mi)
- Time zone: UTC−3 (BRT)
- Postal code: 75820-000

Serranópolis is a municipality in southeast Goiás state, Brazil. It is one of the largest municipalities in the state in area and one of the most sparsely inhabited. It is a large producer of cattle and soybeans.

== Location ==
Serranópolis is located 50 km. south of Jataí and about 80 km north of the border with Mato Grosso do Sul. It is in the Sudoeste de Goiás Microregion and has the following boundaries:

- north: Jataí
- south: Aporé
- west: Mineiros
- east: Itajá

It is crossed by the Verde and Corrente rivers, which are tributaries of the Paranaíba.

Highway connections

Highway connections are made by paved road north to the important BR-060 highway near Jataí, which is 46 kilometers away. The distance from state capital, Goiânia, is 381 km. Main highway connections are made by BR-060 / Abadia de Goiás / Guapó / Indiara / Acreúna / Rio Verde / Jataí / GO-184 / BR-060 / Estreito.

== History ==
The region around Serranópolis has been home to humans for millennia. The remains of an adult man and child were found locally by Altair Sales Barbosa of the Catholic University of Goias and are tentatively dated to 11,000 years ago. They were accompanied by necklaces of human teeth and mother of pearl, some of the oldest known jewelry in the Americas.

The history of European occupation is relatively recent. The first settlers arrived in the decade of the 1880s and grew rice, tobacco, coffee, corn, and beans. In 1953 the settlement called Serra do Cafezal had its name changed to Nuputira, which later was changed to Serranópolis, becoming independent from Jataí in 1959.

== Political and Demographic Information ==
- Mayor: Adenir Domingos Facco (01 / 04 / 2006)
- City council: 09 members
- Eligible voters: 4,939 (2007)
- Population density: 1.33 inhabitants/km^{2} (2007)
- Urban population: 5,155 (2007)
- Rural population: 2,178 (2007)
- Population growth: 1.86% from 2000 to 2007 (the first positive growth since 1991).

== The economy ==
The economy is based on agriculture, cattle raising, services, public administration, and small transformation industries. The economy is predominantly agricultural with 604 farms and 407,000 hectares. Only 25,000 hectares were planted, the rest being pasture and woodlands. Agriculture occupied 1,500 workers, including family members, in 2006. Public service occupied 385 persons in 2006.

- Industrial units: 3 (2007)
- Commercial units: 91 (2007)
- Destillery: Energética Serranópolis Ltda. (May/2006)
- Financial institutions: -BRADESCO S.A. -Banco do Brasil S.A (01/06/2005)
- Automobiles: 525 (2007)
- Cattle herd: 229,000 head (2006)
- Main crops: rice, bananas, sugarcane, beans, manioc, sunflowers, corn, sorghum and soybeans (24,000 hectares).

== Education (2006) ==
- Schools: 09 with 1,711
- Higher education: none
- Adult literacy rate: 84.1% (2000) (national average was 86.4%)

== Health (2007) ==
- Hospitals: 1
- Hospital beds: 18
- Ambulatory clinics: 3
- Infant mortality rate: 13.70 (2000) (national average was 33.0)

Municipal Human Development Index

- MHDI: 0.742
- State ranking: 102 (out of 242 municipalities)
- National ranking: 2,115 (out of 5,507 municipalities) For a complete list see Frigoletto.com

== Tourism ==
There are at least forty caves with paintings left by earlier inhabitants. These show figures of lizards, emas, and parrots and also geometric designs.

The Emas National Park lies to the west.

== See also ==
- List of municipalities in Goiás
- Microregions of Goiás
