= Turvelândia =

- Municipality
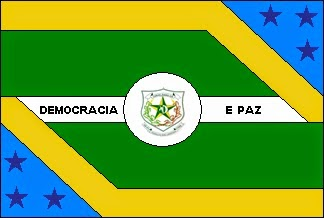
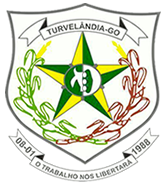
- Flag Coat of arms

- Location in Goiás state

- Location in Brazil
- Coordinates: 17°51′33″S 50°17′22″W
- Country: Brazil
- Region: Central-West
- State: Goiás
- Microregion: Vale do Rio dos Bois

Area
  - Total: 934.2 km^{2} (360.7 sq mi)
- Elevation: 459 m (1,506 ft)

Population (2020)
  - Total: 5,365
  - Density: 5.743/km^{2} (14.87/sq mi)
- Time zone: UTC−3 (BRT)
- Postal code: 75970-000

Turvelândia is a municipality in eastern Goiás state, Brazil.

== Location ==
Turvelândia is located 65 km. east of Rio Verde

- Highway connections from Goiânia are made by state highway BR-060 west from Goiânia, through / Abadia de Goiás / Guapó / Indiara / Acreúna/ GO-164 / Santa Helena de Goiás / BR-452 / GO-409 / Maurilândia.

Neighboring municipalities: Acreúna, Edéia, Santa Helena de Goiás, Maurilândia

== Political Information ==
- Mayor: Eduardo Mendonça (January 2005)
- City council: 09 members
- Eligible voters: 3,348 (December/2007)

== Demographic Information ==
- Population density: 4.1 inhabitants/km^{2} (2007)
- Urban population: 2,865 (2007)
- Rural population: 987 (2007)
- Population growth: a loss of about 1,800 people since 1991

== Economic Information ==
The economy is based on subsistence agriculture, cattle raising, services, public administration, and small transformation industries.

Public administration provided jobs for 238 workers in 2003.

- Industrial units: 3 (2007)
- Commercial units: 32 (2007)
- Destillary: Vale do Verdão S/A (2007)
- Motor vehicles: 233 (2007), which gave a ratio of 16 inhabitants for each motor vehicle
- Cattle herd: 45,000 head (3,600 milk cows) (2006)
- Main crops: cotton, rice, sugarcane (11,200 hectares), manioc, corn (3,000 hectares), sorghum, and soybeans (14,000 hectares).

== Education (2006) ==
- Schools: 4 with 1,075 students
- Higher education: none
- Adult literacy rate: 79.6% (2000) (national average was 86.4%)

== Health (2007) ==
- Hospitals: 1
- Hospital beds: 13
- Ambulatory clinics: 3
- Infant mortality rate: 38.71 (2000) (national average was 33.0)

== Municipal Human Development Index ==
- MHDI: 0.685
- State ranking: 220 (out of 242 municipalities in 2000)
- National ranking: 3,223 (out of 5,507 municipalities in 2000)

Data are from 2000

For the complete list see Frigoletto.com

== See also ==
- List of municipalities in Goiás
- Microregions of Goiás
