= Aporé =

Coordinates: 18°57′40″S 51°55′18″W

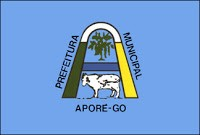
- Flag

- Country: Brazil
- State: Goiás
- Municipality: Aporé
- Incorporated: 1958

Government
  - Mayor: Alceu Barreto Cardoso Filho
  - Vice Mayor: Marlene Sant´ana Vasques Novaes

Area
  - Total: 2,909 km^{2} (1,123 sq mi)
- Elevation: 538 m (1,765 ft)

Population (2020)
  - Total: 4,232
  - Density: 1.23/km^{2} (3.2/sq mi)
- estimated
- Time zone: UTC−3 (BRT)
- Postal code: 75825-000

Aporé is a municipality in southwest Goiás state, Brazil. The municipality is a large producer of cattle. Aporé belongs to the Southwest Goiás Microregion.

== Geography ==
Aporé is 445 quilômetros from the state capital, Goiânia, near the boundary with the state of Mato Grosso do Sul. It is linked by highways BR-060 / Guapó / Indiara / Rio Verde / GO-174 / GO-422 / GO-206 / Caçu / GO-178 / Itajá / GO-302. (Source: Sepin) It is part of the Sudoeste de Goiás Microregion. Municipal boundaries are with Serranópolis, State of Mato Grosso do Sul, Itajá, and Chapadão do Céu.

The climate is tropical humid, with average temperatures between 20 °C and 30 °C. The average elevation is 500 meters above sea level. Important rivers are the Aporé, which forms the boundary between the states of Goiás and Mato Grosso do Sul, the Corrente, the Peixe and the Prata.

Districts, Villages, and Hamlets

- Villages: Itumirim

== Demographics ==
- Population density in 2007: 1.23 inhabitants/km^{2}
- Population growth rate 1996/2007: 0.41.%
- Total population in 2007: 3,554
- Total population in 1980: 2,764
- Urban population in 2007: 2,291
- Rural population in 2007: 1,263

== The economy ==
The main economic activity is cattle raising (210,000 head) and agriculture. The main crops in 2006 were corn and soybeans.

- Industrial units: 5
- Retail units: 43
- Financial institutions: Banco do Brasil S.A. (August/2007)
- Dairies: Laticínios Aporé Indústria e Comércio Ltda. (22/05/2006)
- GDP in 2005 (R$1,000.00): 43,314
- GDP per capita in 2005 (R$1.00): 12,376

Motor vehicles

- Automobiles: 281
- Pickup trucks: 77
- Number of inhabitants per motor vehicle: 10

Main agricultural products in ha.(2006)

- corn: 400
- soybeans: 2,000

Farm Data (2006)in ha.

- Number of farms: 311
- Total area: 322,905
- Area of permanent crops: 322
- Area of perennial crops: 17,835
- Area of natural pasture: 214,147
- Persons dependent on farming: 713

== Health and education ==
The infant mortality rate was (for every 1,000 born alive): 2000—23.82 (IBGE 2002) while the literacy rate was 2000—85.4% (IBGE 2002) In 2006 there were 4 schools with 949 students. There was 1 hospital with 23 beds.

The Municipal Human Development Index was 0.752, ranking Aporé 72 out of 242 municipalities in the state and 1,827 out of 5,507 municipalities in the country.

== History ==
The history of Aporé begins in the twentieth century near a site where a village, Arraial do Corrente, already existed. With the decadence of this settlement rancher João Nunes founded a settlement nearby on the banks of the Aporé River. Lands were donated to erect a chapel to the Divino Espírito Santo and a bridge was built over the river, allowing communications with Mato Grosso. In 1938 the first houses appeared and the village was named Aporé after the river, a name which means "river of fish". In 1958 Aporé became a municipality.

== See also ==
- List of municipalities in Goiás
- Microregions of Goiás
