= Montividiu =

- Municipality
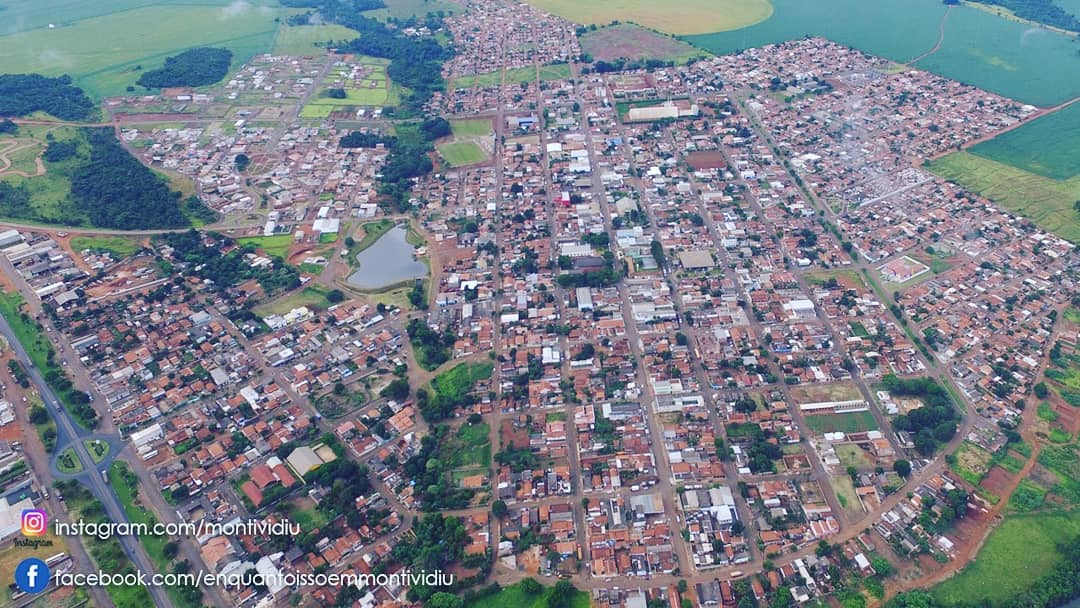

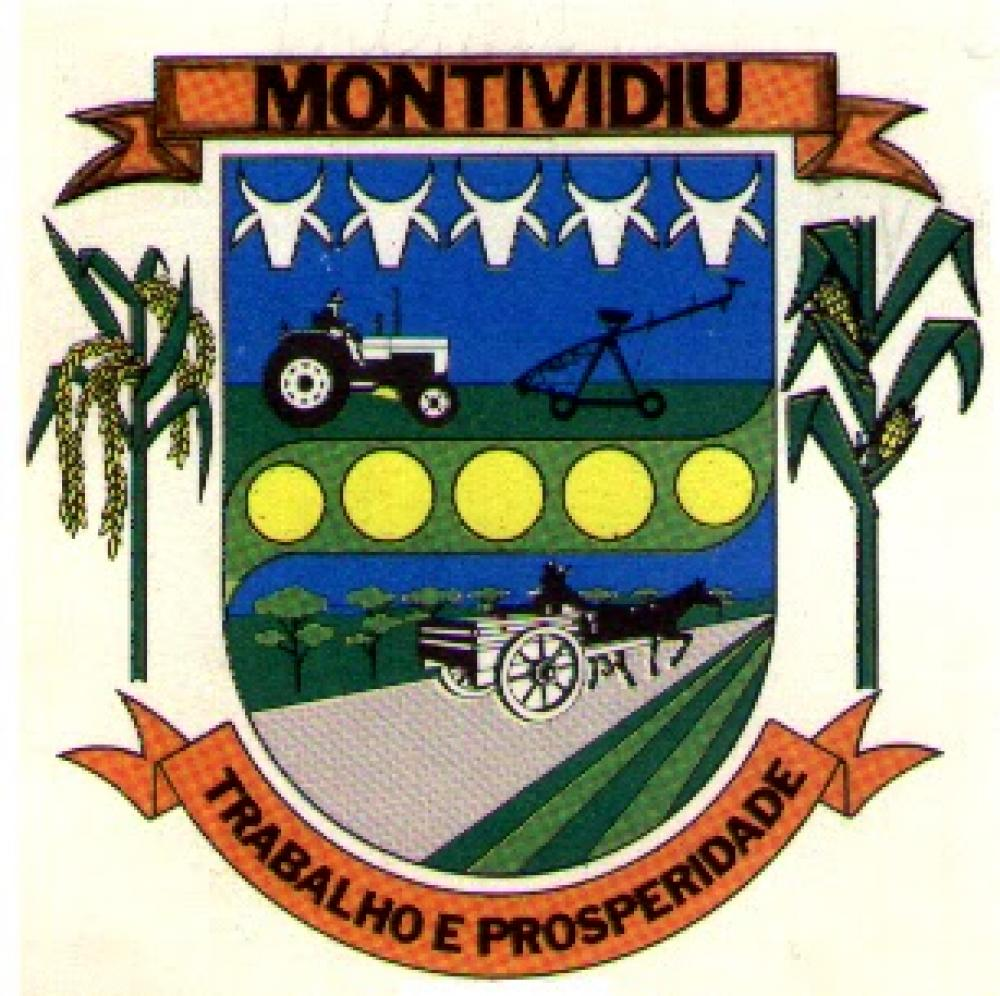
- Flag Coat of arms

- Location in Goiás state

- Location in Brazil
- Coordinates: 17°26′17″S 51°07′39″W
- Country: Brazil
- Region: Central-West
- State: Goiás
- Microregion: Sudoeste de Goiás

Area
  - Total: 1,874.6 km^{2} (723.8 sq mi)
- Elevation: 821 m (2,694 ft)

Population (2020)
  - Total: 13,672
  - Density: 7.2933/km^{2} (18.890/sq mi)
- Time zone: UTC−3 (BRT)
- Postal code: 75915-000

Montividiu is a municipality in eastern Goiás state, Brazil. Montividiu is a large producer of soybeans and corn.

== Geography ==
Montividiu is located in the Sudoeste de Goiás Microregion between the Rio Verdão and the Rio Monte Alegre. There are paved road connections with Rio Verde, 49 kilometers to the south. The distance to the state capital, Goiânia, is 280 km. Highway connections are made by BR-060 / Abadia de Goiás / Guapó / Indiara / Acreúna / Rio Verde / GO-174.

Neighboring municipalities are: Caiapônia, Paraúna and Rio Verde.

== Politics ==
In 2007 the Mayor was Edson Bueno Coutinho and the Vice-mayor was Xisto Gonçalves de Oliveira. There were nine council-members on the city council and there were 7,224 eligible voters in 2007. Montividiu was first created as a district called Chapadão in the municipality of Rio Verde in 1907. In 1938 the name was changed to Montividiu remaining a district until 1987 when it was emancipated.

== Demographics ==
The population density was 4.94 inhabitants/km^{2} in 2007. The population has increased by about 4,500 since the census of 1991. Between 1991 and 2000 the population grew by 3.67.%, with growth continuing at 2.59% from 2000 to 2007. In 2007 the urban population was 7,342 while the rural population was 1,913.

== Economy ==
The economy is based on services, small transformation industries, public administration, agriculture, and cattle raising. In 2007 there were 19 industrial units and 102 retail units. There were 2 financial institutions: Banco do Brasil S.A and Banco Itaú S.A.

In 2006 there were 45,000 head of cattle, 62,700 head of poultry, and 40,000 head of swine.

Montividiu is a large producer of agricultural products. In 2006 the main crops in planted area were cotton (3,200 hectares), rice (500 hectares), beans (2,000 hectares), corn (21,500 hectares), soybeans (105,000 hectares) and sorghum (15,000 hectares). In 2006 there were 281 agricultural units with 115,000 hectares, of which 66,000 were planted, 30,000 natural pasture, and 16,000 woodland. Farms employed about 1,200 workers. There were 410 tractors.

== Health and education ==
In 2003 there was 1 hospital with 14 beds and 3 walk-in health clinics. There were 4 doctors, 0 nurses, and 1 dentist. The infant mortality rate was 17.77 in 1,000 live births in 2000, well below the national and state average.

In 2005 the school system had 14 schools, 98 classrooms, 166 teachers, and 3,271 students. There were no institutions of higher education. The adult literacy rate was 87.2% in 2000.

Ranking on the Municipal Human Development Index (2010)

- Per Capita Monthly Income: 383 Reais
- MHDI: .794
- Ranking in state municipalities: 14 out of 242
- Ranking in national municipalities: 710 out of 5,507

For the complete list see Frigoletto.com

== See also ==
- List of municipalities in Goiás
- Microregions of Goiás
