= Santa Helena de Goiás =

Santa Helena de Goias
- Municipality
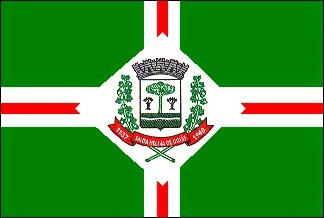
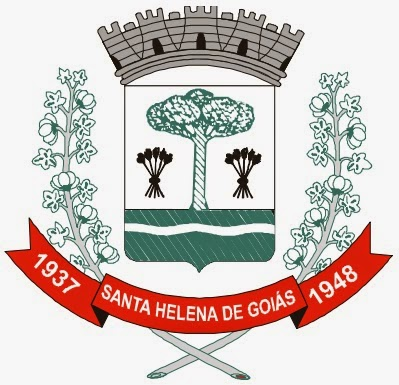
- Flag Coat of arms

- Location in Goiás state

- Location in Brazil
- Coordinates: 17°43′17″S 50°36′13″W
- Country: Brazil
- Region: Central-West
- State: Goiás
- Microregion: Sudoeste de Goiás

Area
  - Total: 1,127.8 km^{2} (435.4 sq mi)
- Elevation: 562 m (1,844 ft)

Population (2020)
  - Total: 38,808
  - Density: 34.410/km^{2} (89.122/sq mi)
- Time zone: UTC−3 (BRT)
- Postal code: 75920-000
- Website: www.santahelena.go.gov.br

Santa Helena de Goiás is a municipality in southwestern Goiás state, Brazil. It is a large producer of corn, sugarcane, soybeans, and poultry.

== Location ==
Santa Helena is located in the Sudoeste de Goiás Microregion, 31 kilometers east of the important city of Rio Verde. It is 32 kilometers south of the BR-060 highway, which links Rio Verde to Goiânia. The distance to the state capital, Goiânia, is 195 km.

Municipal boundaries are with:

- north: Santo Antônio da Barra
- south: Rio Verde and Maurilândia
- east: Turvelândia
- west: Rio Verde

== History ==
In 1934 Custódio P. Vêncio, from Minas Gerais, arrived in the region and bought a large area of land in the region of Buriti Alegre. He attracted other ranchers to the area and soon there was a settlement called Santa Helena. In 1941 the town began to be built with lots demarcated on land donated by Vêncio. In 1943 the name was changed to Ipeguari, meaning "happy field", in homage to the stream called Campo Alegre that flowed through the region. In 1948, when the city became a municipality, the name reverted to Santa Helena de Goiás by popular acclaim.

== Political and Demographic Information ==
- Mayor: João Alberto Rodrigues (2020-2024)
- City council: 09
- Eligible voters: 28,560 (2007)
- Population density: 31.06 inhabitants/km^{2} (2007)
- Urban population: 38,492 (2022)
- Rural population: Unknown (2022)
- Population growth rate: 0.20% 2000/2007 (Santa Helena has been growing much more slowly than neighbors Jataí and Rio Verde).

== Economic information ==
The economy is based on mechanized agriculture, cattle raising, services, public administration, and small transformation industries.

- Industrial units: 48 (2007), employing 970 workers in 2005.
- Commercial units: 412 (2007), employing 1,577 workers in 2005.
- Dairy: Parmalat Brasil S/A - Indústria de Alimentos (22/05/2006)
- Destillery: Usina Santa Helena de Açúcar e de Álcool S/A
- Financial institutions: 5 bank branches (01/06/2005)
- Automobiles: 4,636 (2007)
- Cattle herd: 50,000 head (7,000 milk cows)
- Main crops: cotton, peanuts, rice, sugarcane (25,000 hectares), bananas, sesame seeds, corn (5,000 hectares), and soybeans (44,000 hectares). In 2006 there were 434 farming units with a total area of 98,968 hectares, of which 70,973 were cultivated. The farming sector employed 1,390 persons in 2006.

== Education (2006) and Health (2007) ==
- Schools: 25 with 9,733 students
- Higher education: UEG - Falculdade de Educação, Ciências e Letras de Santa Helena de Goiás. This is a campus of the Universidade do Estado de Goiás, which was inaugurated in 1999. It offers courses in Agrobusiness Administration, Mathematics, and Information Systems.UEG
- Adult literacy rate: 84.0% (2000) (national average was 86.4%)
- Hospitals: 5
- Hospital beds: 131
- Ambulatory clinics: 8
- Infant mortality rate: 25.03 (2000) (national average was 33.0)

Ranking on the Municipal Human Development Index

- Life expectancy: 68.55
- Adult literacy rate: 0.822
- School attendance rate: 0.878
- MHDI: 0.747
- State ranking: 84 (out of 242 municipalities)
- National ranking: 1,973 (out of 5,507 municipalities)

All data are from 2000

For the complete list see Frigoletto.com

== See also ==
- List of municipalities in Goiás
- Microregions of Goiás
