= Aparecida do Rio Doce =

- Municipality
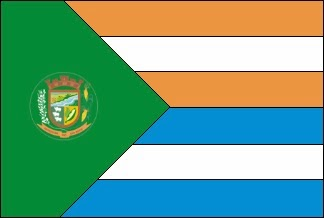
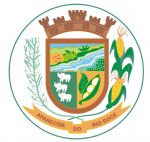
- Flag Coat of arms

- Location in Goiás state

- Location in Brazil
- Coordinates: 18°17′41″S 51°08′18″W
- Country: Brazil
- Region: Central-West
- State: Goiás
- Microregion: Sudoeste de Goiás

Area
  - Total: 290.0 km^{2} (112.0 sq mi)
- Elevation: 549 m (1,801 ft)

Population (2010)
  - Total: 2,427
  - Density: 8.369/km^{2} (21.68/sq mi)
- Time zone: UTC−3 (BRT)
- Postal code: 75827-000

Aparecida do Rio Doce is a municipality in southwest Goiás state, Brazil.

== Geography ==
The municipality of Aparecida do Rio Doce belongs to the Sudoeste de Goiás Microregion and is 208 km. from the state capital, Goiânia. Connections are made by BR-060 / Guapó / Indiara / Rio Verde / GO-174/ GO-422 / BR-364. The town lies at the junction of BR364 and GO174.

Belonging to the Paraná River basin, the river system is varied, with the most important rivers being the Rio Claro and its tributary, the Rio Doce. Along these rivers there are several small waterfalls, the most important being Salto do Rio Claro. The two rivers are used for recreational fishing and swimming by locals and tourists. Municipal boundaries are with Jataí, Rio Verde, and Caçu.

== Demographics ==
- Population density: 4.49 inhabitants/km^{2} (2007)
- Population in 1980: n/a
- Population in 2007: 2,702
- Urban population: 2,088 (2007)
- Rural population: 614. (2007)
- Population growth rate: 1.80% 1996/2007

== The economy ==
The main economic activity is cattle raising for meat (59,000 head in 2006). Farming is secondary and is mainly subsistence, with farmers growing rice, corn, and soybeans. Another economic activity is production of poultry and pigs, due to the proximity of the important Perdigão Foods factory in Rio Verde, one of the largest agroindustrial complexes in the world.

- Industrial units: 4
- Retail units: 52
- Dairies: AGROLUCAS Laticínios Ltda. (22/05/2006)
- GDP in 2005 (R$1,000.00): 25,312
- GDP per capita in 2005 (R$1.00): 9,282

Motor vehicles:

- Automobiles: 213
- Pickup trucks: 26
- Number of inhabitants per motor vehicle: 11

Main agricultural products in ha.(2006)

- rice: 300
- corn: 300
- soybeans: 600

Farm Data (2006)in ha.

- Number of farms: 146
- Total area: 63,807
- Area of permanent crops: 286
- Area of perennial crops: 968
- Area of natural pasture: 48,244
- Persons working in agriculture: 516 IBGE

== Health and education ==
- Infant mortality rate: 1990–39.53; 2000–17.77

(IBGE 2002)

- Literacy rate: 1991–67.5%; 2000–84.2%

(IBGE 2004)

- MHDI: 0.754
- State ranking: 68 (out of 242 municipalities)
- National ranking: 1753 (out of 5507 municipalities)

== History ==
The history of Aparecida do Rio Doce as a municipality is recent as it was elevated to city status in 1993. The name derives from the patron saint of Brazil, Our Lady Aparecida, and the most important river of the region, the Rio Doce, which limits the urban area on the south and flows north to south to eventually join the Rio Claro.

== See also ==
- List of municipalities in Goiás
- Microregions of Goiás
