= Maurilândia =

- Municipality
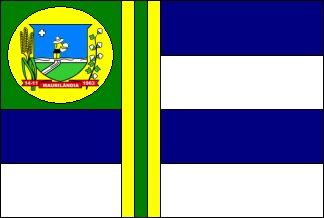
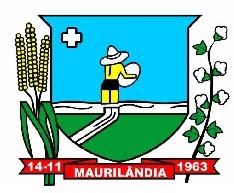
- Flag Coat of arms

- Location in Goiás state

- Location in Brazil
- Coordinates: 17°58′17″S 50°19′58″W
- Country: Brazil
- Region: Central-West
- State: Goiás
- Microregion: Sudoeste de Goiás Microregion

Area
  - Total: 393.7 km^{2} (152.0 sq mi)
- Elevation: 450 m (1,480 ft)

Population (2020)
  - Total: 14,327
  - Density: 36.39/km^{2} (94.25/sq mi)
- Time zone: UTC−3 (BRT)
- Postal code: 75930-000

Maurilândia is a municipality in southwest Goiás state, Brazil. It is a large producer of sugarcane.

== Location ==
Maurilândia is located in the Southwest Goiás Microregion on the Rio São Tomé near the Rio Turvo and the Rio dos Bois, an important tributary of the Paranaíba. It is 13 kilometers south of Turvelândia and 71 kilometers east of the regional center, Rio Verde. The region exhibits high soil fertility and has become one of the most important economic areas of the state of Goiás producing cattle, soybeans, rice and corn. Neighboring municipalities are:

- north: Turvelândia and Porteirão
- south: Castelândia
- east: São Domingos
- west: Rio Verde

Maurilândia is 251 kilometers from the state capital, Goiânia. Highway connections are made by BR-060 / Abadia de Goiás / Indiara / Acreúna / GO-164 / BR-452 / GO-409.

== History ==
Maurilândia began in 1946 when gold and diamond seekers arrived in the region, which belonged to the municipality of Rio Verde. A mining site (garimpo) was established at the meeting of the Ribeirão Cabeleira and the Rio Verdão. Soon many families arrived building straw huts. In 1954 Josias Lula, from Bahia, began to divide and sell lots with the help of local ranch owners. In 1955 the settlement took the name "Garimpo do Rio Verdão". In 1959 it became a district of Rio Verde. In 1963 it became a municipality with the name of Maurilândia. The origin of this name was not available on the Sepin site on 08/04/2008.

== Economy ==
The economy is based on agriculture, cattle raising, services, and modest transformation industries. There is significant production of poultry. In 2006 there were 08 industrial units and 114 retail units. There were 2 bank branches: Banco do Brasil S.A and Banco Itaú S.A. Public administration was the biggest employer in 2005 with 241 workers, followed by commerce with 225 workers, and by agriculture with 134 workers.

There were 18,200 head of cattle and 374,200 head of poultry registered in 2006. There was a significant production of sugarcane with 9,000 hectares planted and a production of 820,000 tons in 2006. Other important crops were corn and soybeans. Sepin. There were 120 agricultural units in 2006 with 15,000 hectares, of which 9,000 hectares were cultivated, and the rest natural pasture or woodlands.

== Health and education ==
In 2007 there was 1 hospital with 18 beds and 1 walk-in health clinic. The infant mortality rate was 23.82 in every 1,000 live births in 2000.

In 2005 the school system had 6 schools with 3,074 students. There were no institutions of higher learning. The adult literacy rate was 81.6% in 2000. Sepin

Ranking on the Municipal Human Development Index

- MHDI: 0.726
- State ranking: 159 (out of 242 municipalities in 2000)
- National ranking: 2.508 (out of 5,507 municipalities in 2000)

Data from 2000

For the complete list see Frigoletto.com

== See also ==
- List of municipalities in Goiás
