= Castelândia =

- Municipality
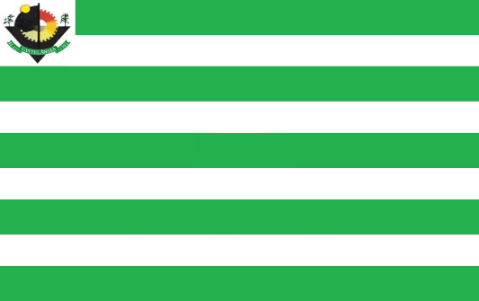
- Flag Coat of arms

- Location in Goiás state

- Location in Brazil
- Coordinates: 18°04′57″S 50°12′49″W
- Country: Brazil
- Region: Central-West
- State: Goiás
- Microregion: Sudoeste de Goiás

Area
  - Total: 298.4 km^{2} (115.2 sq mi)
- Elevation: 443 m (1,453 ft)

Population (2020)
  - Total: 3,407
  - Density: 11.42/km^{2} (29.57/sq mi)
- Time zone: UTC−3 (BRT)
- Postal code: 75925-000

Castelândia is a municipality in southwest Goiás state, Brazil. It is a large producer of sugar cane and soybeans.

== Location ==
Castelândia is located in the southwest of the state, west of the Rio dos Bois, a major tributary of the Paranaíba. It is 54 kilometers northeast of the regional center, Quirinópolis and 95 kilometers southwest of Rio Verde. The distance to the state capital, Goiânia, is 282 km. Highway connections are made by GO-040 / Aragoiânia / Cromínia / Pontalina / Bom Jesus de Goiás / BR-452 / GO-319 / Aloândia. Sepin. Neighboring municipalities are Rio Verde, Maurilândia, and Bom Jesus de Goiás.

== Demographics ==
- Population density in 2007: 11.87 inhabitants/km^{2}
- Population growth rate 1996/2007: -0.31.%
- Total population in 2007: 3,530
- Total population in 1996: 3,653
- Urban population in 2007: 3,205
- Rural population in 2007: 325

== The economy ==
The economy is based on cattle raising (22,000 head in 2006), poultry production, and growing of sugar cane, corn, and soybeans. There was 01 financial institution in 2007—BRADESCO S.A

Motor vehicles

- Automobiles: 187
- Pickup trucks: 38
- Number of inhabitants per motor vehicle: 15.6

Main agricultural products in ha.(2006)

- rice: 600
- sugarcane: 2,600
- corn: 3,000
- soybeans: 6,000

Farm Data (2006)in ha.

- Number of farms: 119
- Total area: 23,793
- Area of permanent crops: n/a
- Area of perennial crops: 18,246
- Area of natural pasture: 4,212
- Persons dependent on farming: 351

== Health and education ==
In 2006 there was 01 hospital with 15 beds. There were no institutions of higher education.

- The infant mortality rate was 20.02 in 2000.
- The literacy rate was 80.0 in 2000.
- MHDI: 0.732
- State ranking: 137 (out of 242 municipalities)
- National ranking: 2,379 (out of 5,507 municipalities)

== History ==
Castelândia was created as a district belonging to the municipality of Rio Verde in 1963. In 1993 it was dismembered from Rio Verde to become its own municipality.

== See also ==
- List of municipalities in Goiás
- Microregions of Goiás
