= Microregion of Sudoeste de Goiás =

Coordinates: 17°52′51″S 51°42′50″W

Sudoeste de Goiás
- Microregion
- Location in Goias state
- Country: Brazil
- State: Goiás
- Mesoregion: Sul Goiano
- Municipalities: 18

Area
  - Total: 56,293 km^{2} (21,735 sq mi)

Population (2007)
  - Total: 397,387
  - Density: 7.1/km^{2} (18/sq mi)

Sudoeste de Goiás Microregion is a region in southwest Goiás state, Brazil. It includes 18 municipalities with a population of 397,387 in a total area of 56,293.30 km^{2} (21,734.96 sq mi) (2007). The largest towns are Jataí, Santa Helena de Goiás, and Rio Verde. It is watered by several important rivers, which are tributaries of the Paranaíba.

This is possibly the richest region of the state of Goiás and is a large producer of soybeans, corn, and cotton. The relatively flat grassy plains are ideal for cattle grazing. Several of the state's most prosperous cities are located here.

The most populous municipality is Rio Verde with 149,3821 inhabitants (2007). The least populous is Aparecida do Rio Doce with 2,702 inhabitants (2007).

The largest municipality in area is Mineiros with 9,096.4 km^{2}. The smallest is Aparecida do Rio Doce with 290 km^{2}.

== Municipalities ==
The microregion consists of the following municipalities:

Name	Population (2007)
Aparecida do Rio Doce	2,702
Aporé	3,554
Caiapônia	15,747
Castelândia	3,530
Chapadão do Céu	5,289
Doverlândia	8,344
Jataí	81,972
Maurilândia	10,769
Mineiros	45,189
Montividiu	9,255
Palestina de Goiás	3,229
Perolândia	2,748
Portelândia	3,310
Rio Verde	149,382
Santa Helena de Goiás	35,027
Santa Rita do Araguaia	5,873
Santo Antônio da Barra	4,134
Serranópolis	7,333

== See also ==
- List of municipalities in Goiás
- Microregions of Goiás
