= Santo Antônio da Barra =

- Municipality
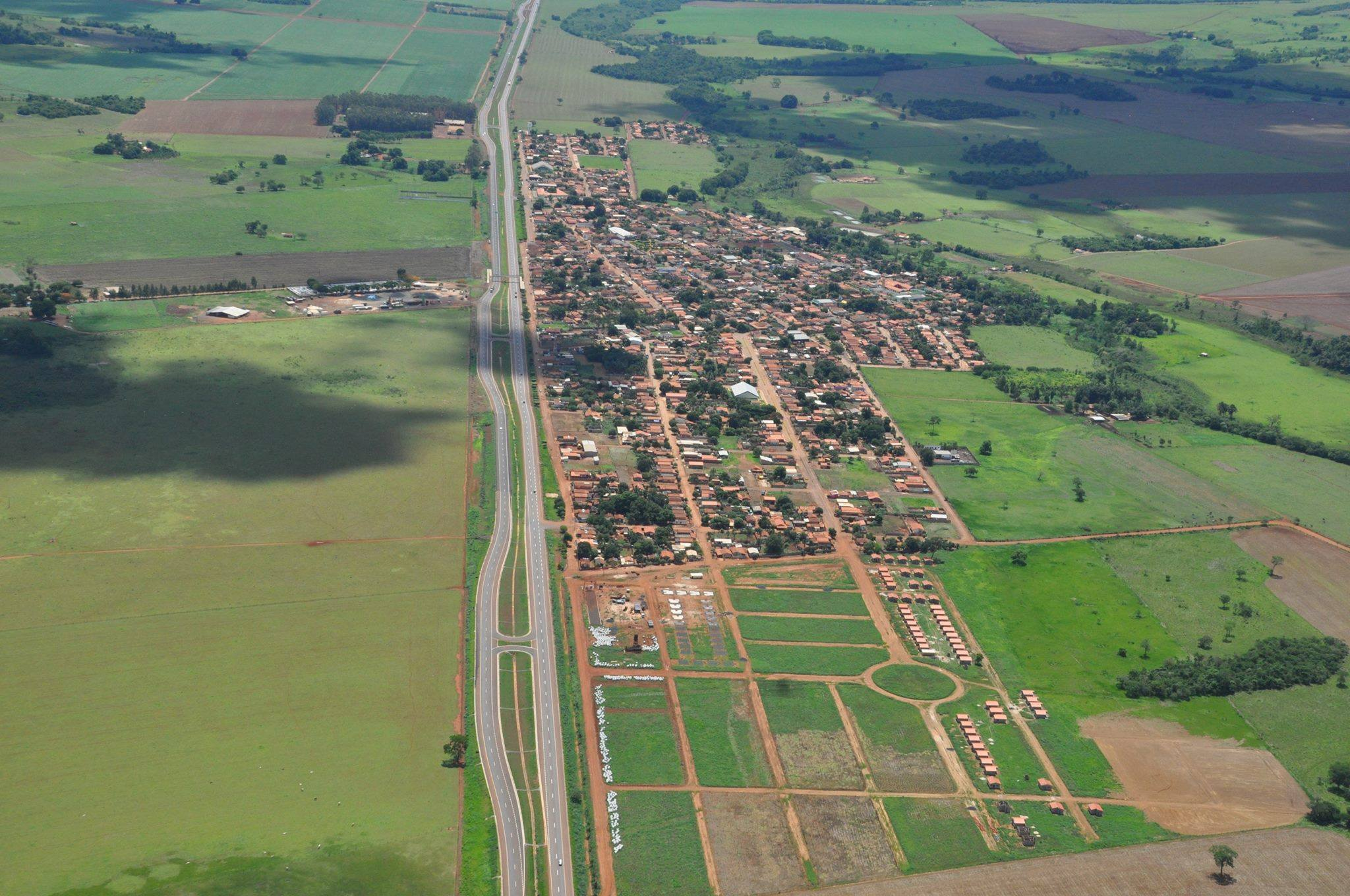
- View of Santo Antônio da Barra

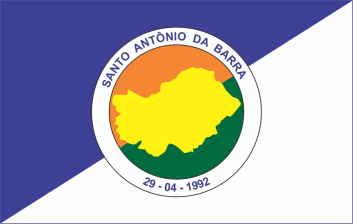
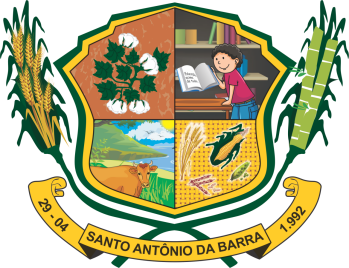
- Flag Coat of arms

- Location in Goiás state

- Location in Brazil
- Coordinates: 17°33′30″S 50°37′26″W
- Country: Brazil
- Region: Central-West
- State: Goiás
- Microregion: Sudoeste de Goiás

Area
  - Total: 451.5 km^{2} (174.3 sq mi)
- Elevation: 650 m (2,130 ft)

Population (2020)
  - Total: 4,854
  - Density: 10.75/km^{2} (27.84/sq mi)
- Time zone: UTC−3 (BRT)
- Postal code: 75935-000
- Website: www.santoantoniodabarra.go.gov.br

Santo Antônio da Barra is a municipality in southwest Goiás state, Brazil. The population was 4,854 (2020 estimate) in a total area of 451.6 km². The elevation of the municipal seat is 650 meters. Santo Antônio is a large producer of poultry.

== Location ==
Santo Antônio is 190 kilometers from the state capital, Goiânia and is part of the Sudoeste de Goiás Microregion. The highway connection from Goiânia is BR-060. It has boundaries with the following municipalities:

- north: Paraúna
- south: Santa Helena de Goiás
- east: Acreúna
- west: Rio Verde

== Geographical information ==
The climate is moist tropical with high night-time temperatures. The rainy season is from October to March and the dry season is from April to September. Because of the hot and dry climate, the main vegetation is sparse cerrado. In the valleys there are still forests with sucupira, aroeira, pindaíba and other species of trees.

Santo Antônio da Barra is bathed by a vast river network, formed by the Verdão, which separates the municipality from Acreúna and Paraúna; Verdinho, on the border with Rio Verde; and Ribeirão Lage, which forms the boundary with Santa Helena de Goiás.

Electric energy is furnished by the Hidrelétrica de Cachoeira Dourada, on the Paranaíba.

== History ==
Occupation of the region began in 1951 when Joaquim Domingos da Silva and his wife Alventina Borges da Silva fixed a cross in devotion to Santo Antônio. In 1963 the settlement was elevated to the status of district of Rio Verde The first municipal school, Escola Municipal Antônio Gouvêia de Morais, was built in 1976 with the secondary school, Irmãos Messias da Costa, being built in 1983. Finally, after a plebiscite, the district was emancipated and became a municipality in 1992.

== Political and Demographic Information ==
- Mayor: José Cândido do Nascimento (January 2013)
- City council: 09
- Eligible voters: 3,735 (2007)
- Population growth: 0.29% from 2000 to 2007

== Economic information ==
The economy is based on subsistence agriculture, cattle raising, services, public administration, and small transformation industries. IN 2006 there were 41 agricultural units with 9,219 hectares, of which 3,090 were planted in crops. About 150 persons were employed in agriculture. The largest employer in the town was public service with 385 persons in 2006.

- Industrial units: 3 (2007)
- Commercial units: 35 (2007)
- Automobiles: 228 (2007)
- Cattle herd: 22,000 head (2006)
- Main crops: cotton, rice, coconuts, beans, manioc, corn, tomatoes, and soybeans.

== Education (2006)and Health (2007) ==
- Schools: 5 with 1,367 students
- Higher education: none
- Adult literacy rate: 77.1% (2000) (national average was 86.4%)
- Hospitals: 0
- Hospital beds: 0
- Ambulatory clinics: 1
- Infant mortality rate: 9.92 (2000) (national average was 33.0.

Municipal Human Development Index

- MHDI: 0.746
- State ranking: 86 (out of 242 municipalities in 2000)
- National ranking: 1,984 (out of 5,507 municipalities in 2000)

Data are from 2000

For the complete list see Frigoletto.com

== See also ==
- List of municipalities in Goiás
- Microregions of Goiás
