= Mineiros =

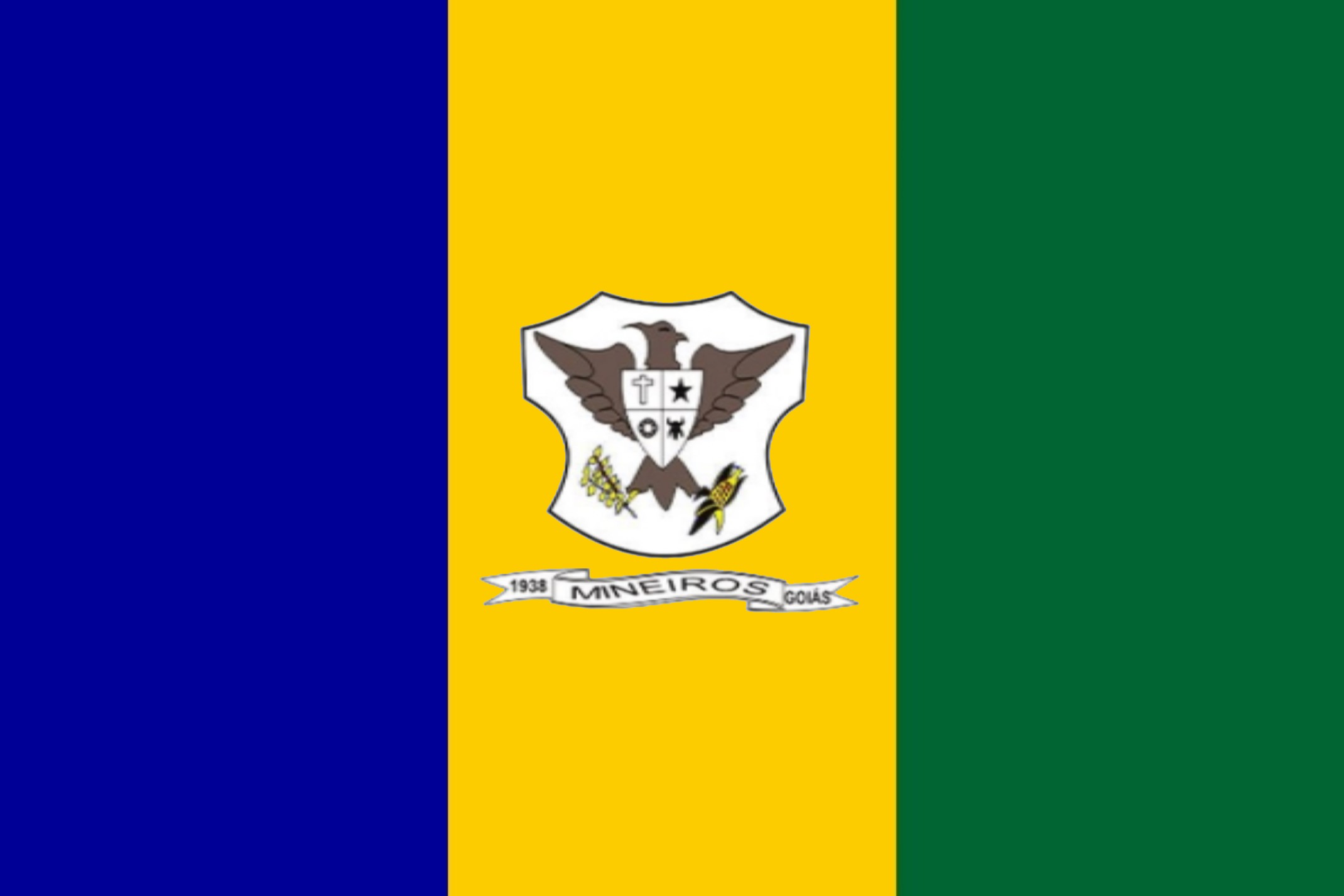
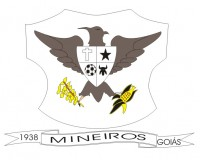
- Flag Coat of arms

- Location of Mineiros in Goiás

- Location within Brazil
- Coordinates: 17°34′13″S 52°33′19″W
- Country: Brazil
- Region: Central-West
- State: Goiás
- Founded: October 31, 1939

Government
  - Mayor: Aleomar Rezende (PMDB)

Area
  - Total: 8,896.304 km^{2} (3,434.882 sq mi)
- Elevation: 770 m (2,530 ft)

Population (2022)
  - Total: 70,081
  - Density: 7.75/km^{2} (20.1/sq mi)
- Time zone: UTC−3 (BRT)
- Website: www.mineiros.go.gov.br

Mineiros, population 70,081 as of 2022, is a municipality in the southwest of the state of Goiás, Brazil. Mineiros is the westernmost city in Goiás and a great producer of cattle, soybeans, and corn.

Mineiros is located 430 km from the state capital, Goiânia, and is connected to the large town of Jataí by BR-364. Highway connections from Goiânia are made by BR-060 / Abadia de Goiás / Guapó / Indiara / Acreúna / Rio Verde / Jataí / GO-050 / BR-364. See Sepin

== Geography ==
It is one of the largest municipalities in the state as well as one of the oldest. It is part of the IBGE statistical microregion of Sudoeste de Goiás.

== Origin of the name ==
The name "Mineiros" comes from the first explorers who were from Minas Gerais. They settled in the region around 1873, building huts, ranch houses, churches, and chapels for saints.

One of these settlers, who came to be known as "João Mineiro", because of his origin in Minas Gerais, was supposedly the first European to settle on the banks of a stream, a tributary of the Verdinho River, which soon was called the stream of the "Mineiro". This stream is the Mineiros stream today.

The first official name was "Mineiro", when the settlement became a "vila" (old name for municipality) in 1905. In 1933 the name was changed to Mineiros as it appears today.

== Demographics ==
The population density was 5.08 inhabitants/km^{2} in 2007. The population has more than doubled since 1980, when it was 21,690. While the urban area has increased dramatically, the rural area has lost little population in the last 25 years, having 4,506 inhabitants in 2007. The population increased by 2.12% between 2000 and 2007.

== Economy ==
Considered one of the most prosperous regions of Brazilian agribusiness, the municipality of Mineiros is a great producer of soybeans, corn, sorghum and cotton, as well as beef and dairy cattle. It is the third largest producer of grains in the state. In an axis of 100kilometers from the city there are fields producing more than 1 million tons a year of soybeans and sorghum. Because of this, the city has large grain storage facilities.

In 2007, the city had an industrial district—Distrito Agroindustrial - I e II - DAIM—and there were 66 industrial units registered. The retail sector was very strong with 671 units in 2007. There was a meat-packing house—FRIGOESTRELA - Frigorífico Estrela D'Oeste Ltda—and a dairy—Coop. M. Agrop. do Vale do Araguaia Ltda. The banking sector was represented by 6 institutions: Banco do Brasil, Bradesco, Banco Itaú, CEF, HSBC Bank Brasil, Banco Multiplo, Banco Mercantil do Brasil.

=== Agriculture ===
Like many cities in the state of Goiás the economy is based on cattle raising and agriculture. There were approximately 310,000 head of cattle in the municipality in 2006 of which 34,000 were milk cows. Agricultural production was based on cotton, corn, soybeans, and sorghum. Main crops in 2006 were:

- corn: 25,500 hectares
- soybeans: 133,000 hectares
- cotton: 2,492 hectares
- sorghum: 18,000 hectares

Wheat production has decreased in recent years.

==== Farm statistics 2006 ====
- Number of farms: 1,247
- Agricultural land area: 558,998
- Area of permanent crops: 1,490
- Area of perennial crops: 108,563
- Area of natural pasture: 315,574
- Persons working in agriculture: 3,364 (IBGE 2006)

== Quality of life ==
90% of the urban population is served by a sewage system and chlorinated water.

=== Health and education ===
In 2007, there were 4 hospitals with 217 beds. There were also 8 walk-in health clinics. The infant mortality rate was 16.58 for every 1,000 live births in 2000, having been 39.53 in 1990.

In 2006, the school system had 45 schools with 13,000 students. There were 2 institutions of higher learning: Fundação Integrada Municipal de Ensino Superior-FIMES, Pólo Unopar EAD and a campus of the State University of Goiás—Pólo Universitário da UEG. The adult literacy rate was 88% in 2000.

=== Municipal Human Development Index ===
- Life expectancy: 72.1
- Adult literacy rate: 86.6%
- School attendance rate: 77.9%
- MHDI: 0.780
- State ranking: 30 (out of 242 municipalities in 2000)
- National ranking: 1,046 (out of 5,507 municipalities in 2000)

== Tourism ==
The city of Mineiros preserves more than 1,000 km^{2} of native vegetation, in the Parque Nacional das Emas. Created in 1961, the park is 80 km distant from Mineiros and is under the jurisdiction of IBAMA. Its biodiversity is recognized as one of the richest in Latin America. At a distance of 63 km. lies Pedra Aparada, an important ecological site because of its arqueological characteristics. Mineiros also has such attractions as the sulphurous waters of Pilões, Água Emendada, Casa de Pedra, Corrente das Cachoeiras, Mata dos Coqueiros, Mata Típica, Cedro – Quilombo dos Negros, many colonial homes and the Center for Gaucho Traditions.

== See also ==
- List of municipalities in Goiás
