= Jataí =

Jataí, Goiás, Brazil
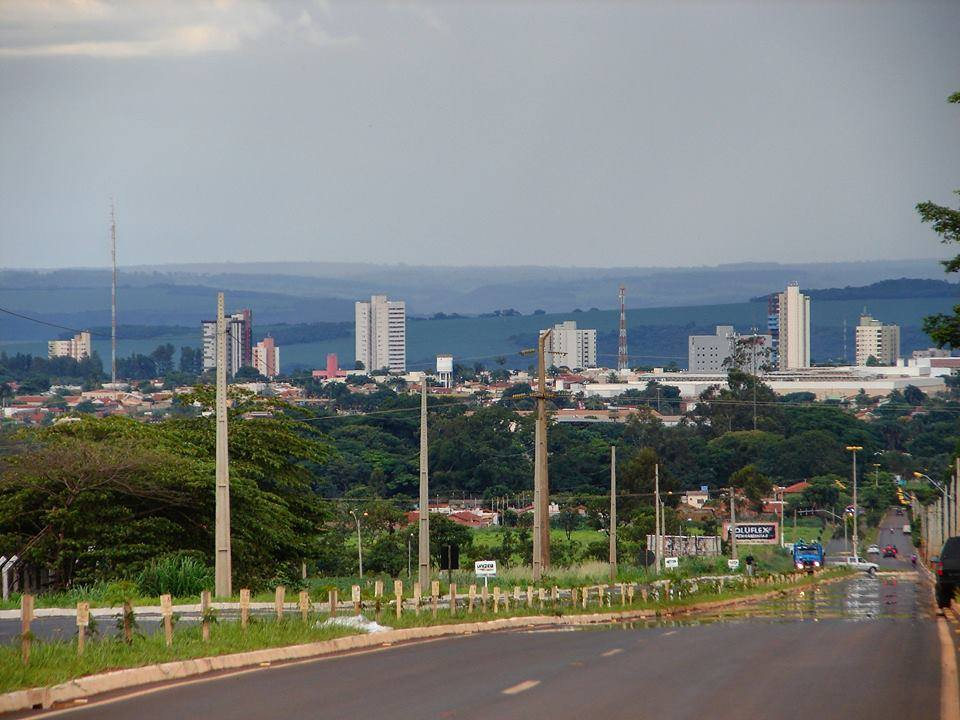

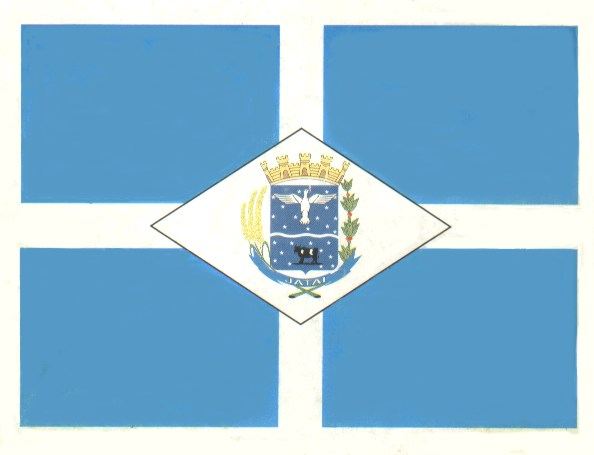
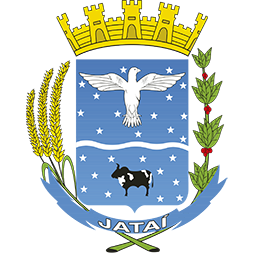
- Flag Coat of arms
- Nickname: Bee City
- Location in the state of Goiás.

- Location within Brazil
- Coordinates: 17°52′51″S 51°49′50″W
- Country: Brazil
- Region: Southwest Goiás Microregion
- State: Goiás

Government
  - Mayor: Humberto de Freitas Machado

Area
  - Total: 7.174 km^{2} (2.770 sq mi)
- Elevation: 708 m (2,323 ft)

Population (2022 Census)
  - Total: 105,729
  - Estimate (2025): 111,634
  - Density: 14.2/km^{2} (37/sq mi)
- Time zone: UTC−3 (BRT)
- HDI (2000): 0,793 – high
- Website: www.jatai.go.gov.br

Jataí is a municipality in southern Goiás state, Brazil. Its population was 105,729 (2022 Census) in a total area of 7,174.2 km^{2} (2,770.0 sq mi). Jataí is a major producer of agricultural products, including soybeans, rice, and corn. It has the largest herd of cattle in the state and is a large producer of poultry and swine. In 2000 it was the 6th largest municipality in area in the state.

== Geography ==
Jataí is located in the southwest part of the state at the confluence of the São Pedro and Claro rivers. The state capital of Goiânia is 316 km (196 mi). away. Highway connections are made by BR-060 / Abadia de Goiás / Guapó / Indiara / Acreúna / Santo Antônio da Barra / Rio Verde. See Sepin

Geographical limits: Caiapônia, Mineiros, Itarumã, Aparecida do Rio Doce, Caçu, Cachoeira Alta, Rio Verde, Mineiros and Serranópolis.

Jataí is part of the Southwest Goiás Microregion, which has a population of 330,490 inhabitants in 18 cities and a total area of 56,293.30 km^{2} (21,734.96 sq mi).

=== Climate ===
Climate: Tropical mesothermic, with two seasons well defined by the seasonal regime of rain. Period of rain: October to April. Period of drought: May to September. Temperature: average minimum and maximum in June (coldest month) is: 11–27 °C (52–81 °F). In September (hottest month): 18–35 °C (64–95 °F). Temperatures can reach as high as 38 °C (100 °F) and as low as 2 °C (36 °F) during the year. A surprising 0 °C (32 °F) was recorded on July 18, 2000. Precipitation: rainfall of approximately 1,800 mm (71 in), but unevenly distributed throughout the year.

Climate data for Jataí (1991–2020)
Month	Jan	Feb	Mar	Apr	May	Jun	Jul	Aug	Sep	Oct	Nov	Dec	Year
Mean daily maximum °C (°F)	30.7 (87.3)	30.9 (87.6)	30.9 (87.6)	30.6 (87.1)	29.0 (84.2)	29.2 (84.6)	29.9 (85.8)	32.1 (89.8)	33.4 (92.1)	32.6 (90.7)	31.2 (88.2)	30.8 (87.4)	30.9 (87.6)
Daily mean °C (°F)	24.3 (75.7)	24.1 (75.4)	24.0 (75.2)	23.0 (73.4)	20.2 (68.4)	19.3 (66.7)	19.3 (66.7)	21.5 (70.7)	24.1 (75.4)	24.7 (76.5)	24.4 (75.9)	24.4 (75.9)	22.8 (73.0)
Mean daily minimum °C (°F)	20.3 (68.5)	20.1 (68.2)	19.9 (67.8)	18.1 (64.6)	14.4 (57.9)	12.6 (54.7)	11.6 (52.9)	13.1 (55.6)	16.8 (62.2)	19.1 (66.4)	19.8 (67.6)	20.3 (68.5)	17.2 (63.0)
Average precipitation mm (inches)	226.6 (8.92)	236.1 (9.30)	275.4 (10.84)	110.5 (4.35)	47.9 (1.89)	18.9 (0.74)	7.4 (0.29)	10.3 (0.41)	59.2 (2.33)	136.6 (5.38)	200.0 (7.87)	264.4 (10.41)	1,593.3 (62.73)
Average precipitation days (≥ 1.0 mm)	17.0	16.5	16.9	8.9	3.6	1.7	1.0	1.6	5.6	10.5	14.2	17.1	114.6
Average relative humidity (%)	77.4	78.4	78.4	76.1	73.3	68.4	59.5	49.7	54.1	65.4	73.0	77.1	69.2
Average dew point °C (°F)	20.4 (68.7)	20.4 (68.7)	20.4 (68.7)	19.3 (66.7)	16.4 (61.5)	14.5 (58.1)	12.5 (54.5)	11.8 (53.2)	14.4 (57.9)	18.1 (64.6)	19.6 (67.3)	20.4 (68.7)	17.4 (63.3)
Mean monthly sunshine hours	151.2	145.2	167.9	206.5	230.0	232.5	252.3	253.3	196.1	181.7	165.2	157.5	2,339.4
Source: NOAA

=== Hydrography ===
The municipality is located in the Serra do Caiapó, which divides the basins of the Araguaia and the Parnaíba rivers. Its hydro graphic network belongs to the basin of the Paraná, being composed of tributaries on the right bank of the Parnaíba.

Rivers: Claro, São Pedro, Doce, Ariranha e Paraíso. The water is supplied by the Claro river and distributed to the population after treatment.

== History ==
The history of Jataí, like that of all the southwest of Goiás, makes up the last phase of the expansion of cattle. In 1836 José Manoel Vilela, from Minas Gerais, came from the east, crossing the Rio Verde. He set up a cattle ranch on the banks of the Rio Claro. Soon a settlement was formed with the name "Paraíso". In 1864 a district was formed with the name Paraíso de Jataí. The first church was built in 1867. In 1882 the municipality of Paraíso was created. Later, in 1885, the name was changed to Jataí.

== Politics ==
Position	Name
Mayor	Geneilton Assis
Vice-mayor	Flaviane Scopel
Number of councilmembers	10
Total number of eligible voters	52,983 (2024)

== Demography ==
- Population density: 11.07 inhabitants per square kilometre (28.7/sq mi) (2003)
- Population in 1980: 53,394 (42,840 urban and 10,554 rural)
- Population in 1991: 65,957 (55,593 urban and 10,364 rural)
- Population in 2003: 79,398 (73,202 urban and 6,196 rural) (1)
- Population in 2007: 81,972
- Population in 2022: 105,729
- Population in 2024: 110.400

(1) Estimated by logistic method

- Population growth rate 1991/1996: 0.96%
- Population growth rate 1991/2000: 1.51%
- Population growth rate 1996/2000: 2.19%
- Population growth rate 2000/2007: 1.19%
- Population growth rate 2007/2022: 28.982%
- Population growth rate 2022/2024: 4.418%

== Economy ==
Jataí has a number of small-sized commercial establishments and service-providing enterprises. Its economy is mostly based on agriculture (soy, rice, corn, beans, and bananas), cattle, pig, and chicken raising, although commerce and transformation industries—especially the clothing industry—play an important role, they are highly dependent on the town's agribusiness. In 2005 the biggest employer was commerce with 3,811 workers, followed by public administration with 2,969 workers, and industry with 2,828 workers. (IBGE)

=== Economic data ===
- Number of Industrial Establishments: 139 (2007)
- Industrial District: Distrito Agroindustrial - DAIJA (Sept/2007)
- Meat-packing Plants/Egg collection: Gale Agroindustrial S/A (07/06/2005)
- Dairies: - Laticínios Dallas Ind. e Com. Ltda.; - Agromilk Indústria e Comércio de Laticínios Ltda.; - Dairy Partners Americas Manufacturing Brasil (07/06/2005)
- Banking Establishments: - -Banco ABN AMRO Real S.A. -Banco do Brasil S.A.(2) - BRADESCO S.A (2) - CEF - Banco Itaú S.A.(2) - HSBC Bank Brasil S.A –Banco Múltiplo (August 2007)
- Number of Retail Commercial Establishments: 1,124 (2007)
- Motor vehicles: 13,671 automobiles, 1,535 trucks, 3,248 pickup trucks, and 7,742 motorcycles. (2007)

=== Multinational enterprises in Jataí ===
- ADM - food processing company, headquartered in United States.
- Foods Brasil SA - food processing company in Brazil.
- Cosan - national leader in the sugar-alcohol sector, the largest producer of sugar and ethanol in the world.
- Louis Dreyfus Commodities - improved processing of food in Europe with headquarters in France.
- Nestle - Processing of foods, headquartered in Switzerland.

=== Animal raising (2006) ===
- Poultry: (head) 2,479,000
- Cattle (head) 323,000
- Swine: (head) 30,000
- Milk cows (head): 42,300

=== Agricultural data (2006) ===
- Farms: 1,590
- Planted area: 218,670 ha (540,300 acres)
- Natural Pasture: 200,445 ha (495,310 acres)
- Woodland and Forest: 96,712 ha (238,980 acres)
- Persons occupied related to the farm owner: 3,013
- Persons occupied not related to the farm owner: 3,060
- Main crops: soybeans (20,000 ha [49,000 acres]), corn (108,000 ha [270,000 acres]), soybeans (230,000 ha [570,000 acres]), sorghum (26,000 ha [64,000 acres]), sunflowers, and wheat.

== Infrastructure ==
There are three institutes of higher education, including a campus of the Federal University of Goiás. This campus features 9 courses distributed in three academic units: the Center of Human Sciences, Letters, and Exact Sciences, the Center of Physical Education and the Center of Agricultural and Biological Sciences.

In the health sector there were four hospitals, 11 clinics, and one maternity.

In communications there were 5 radio stations and two local television stations. In addition there were 2 newspapers.

=== Education (2006) ===
- Schools in activity: 64 with 24,600 students
- Higher education: - Centro de Ensino Superior de Jataí (CESUT) - Federal University of Jatai (UFJ) - Pólo Universitário da UEG - Instituto Federal de Goiás (IFG)
- Literacy Rate: 89.8%

=== Health (2007) ===
- Hospitals: 5
- Beds: 198
- Walk-in health clinics: 27
- Infant mortality rate: 17.77 (in 1,000 live births)

=== The Human Development Index ===
- Municipal Human Development Index MHDI: 0.793
- State ranking: 15 (out of 242 municipalities)
- National ranking: 740 (out of 5,507 municipalities)

Data are from 2000

== See also ==
- List of municipalities in Goiás
