= Acreúna =

- Municipality
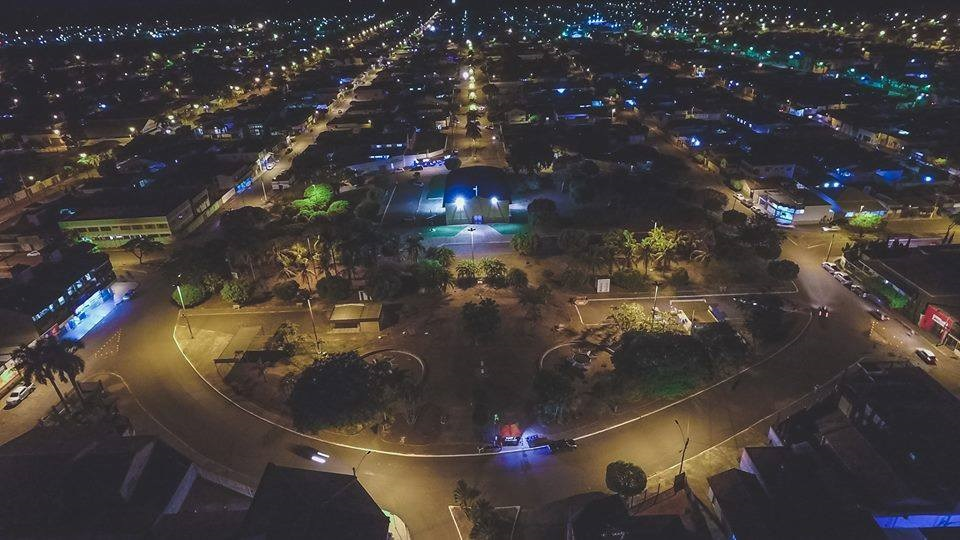
- View of Acreúna

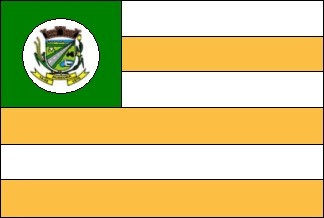
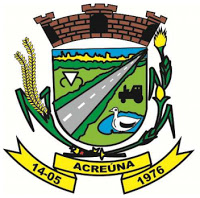
- Flag Coat of arms

- Location in Goiás state

- Location in Brazil
- Coordinates: 17°23′44″S 50°22′06″W
- Country: Brazil
- Region: Central-West
- State: Goiás

Area
  - Total: 1,571.1 km^{2} (606.6 sq mi)
- Elevation: 542 m (1,778 ft)

Population (2025)
  - Total: 22,079
  - Density: 14.053/km^{2} (36.398/sq mi)
  - Town/Settlement: 20,830
- Time zone: UTC−3 (BRT)
- Postal code: 75960-000

Acreúna is a city and municipality in western Goiás state, Brazil.

== Location ==
Acreúna is located in the statistical micro-region of Vale do Rio dos Bois, southwest of the state capital, Goiânia, on BR-060, (Brasília-Acre) which links Goiânia with Rio Verde. The distance to Goiânia is 153 kilometers via BR-060 / Guapó / Indiara. Municipal boundaries:

- North: Paraúna and Jandaia
- South: Turvelândia
- East: Edéia and Indiara
- West: Montividiu and Santo Antônio da Barra

== History ==
The town appeared in 1964 in the territory of the municipality of Paraúna. It was created through the initiative of Benedicto Arystogogo de Mello, who had already founded the settlements of Riverlândia, in Rio Verde, and Vila Brasil, in Santa Helena de Goiás.

Mello negotiated with a large landowner of the region to begin selling the lots. The lands were on the banks of the Rio Verdão and near the Brasília – Acre highway, which was under construction at the time.

Origin of the name

The name of the town, Acreúna, comes from a combination of Acre, final destination of the highway which crosses the town, and Una, a tribute to Paraúna, the municipality where it had been located before becoming a separate municipality.

It became a district in 1968 and, thanks to its rapid population growth and economic development, it separated from Paraúna in 1976 to become an independent municipality.

== Demographic and Political Data ==
- Population density: 11.85 inhabitants/km^{2} (2007)
- Population density: 12.95 inhabitants/km^{2} (2010)
- Growth rate 2000/2007: 0.20.%
- Urban population: 16,424 (2007)
- Urban population: 20,279 (2010)
- Rural population: 2,129 (2007)
- Eligible voters: 14,790
- City government in 2005: mayor (João Batista Pereira), vice-mayor (Paulo Rogério Pereira), and 09 councilmembers

== The economy ==
The economy is based on agriculture, with a great production of sugarcane, cotton, corn, and soybeans (see below). The cattle herd had 99,000 head in 2003.

- Industrial units: 36
- Retail commercial units: 213
- Banking units: Banco do Brasil S.A.- BRADESCO S.A.- Banco Itaú S.A. (August/2007)
- GDP (PIB) (R$1,000.00): 229,685 (2005)
- GDP per capita (R$1.00): 10,959 (2005)

Vehicles (2007)

- automobiles: 1,862
- trucks: 317
- pickups: 413
- motorcycles: 1,001

Source: IBGE

The main agricultural products (2007)

- cotton: 2,000 ha. / 5,200 tons (Acreuna produced 55,000 tons in 2001)
- sugarcane: 5,700 hectares / 501,600 tons
- corn: 10,000 hectares / 60,000 tons
- soybeans: 22,000 hectares / 61,600 tons

Source: Sepin

Farm information

- Number of farms: 434
- Total farm area: 141,236
- Planted area: 51,300 ha.
- Area of natural pasture: 65,990 ha.
- Workers in agriculture: 1,042

== Health ==
- Infant mortality rate in 2014: 23.97
- Infant mortality rate in 2000: 21.13
- Infant mortality rate in 1990: 35.64
- Hospitals: 03 with 75 beds (2007)

== Education ==
- Literacy rate in 2015: 97.1
- Literacy rate in 2000: 83.2
- Literacy rate in 1991: 77.1
- Schools: 13 with 3,840 students (2015)
- Schools: 12 with 6,309 students (2006)
- Higher education: none reporting in 2006

Source: IBGE

- Municipal Human Development Index: 0.686 (2010)
- Municipal Human Development Index: 0.763
- State ranking: 50 (out of 242 municipalities)
- National ranking: 1,498 (out of 5,507 municipalities)

For the complete list see Frigoletto.com

== See also ==
- List of municipalities in Goiás
- Microregions of Goiás
