= Rio Verde, Goiás =

Rio Verde
- Municipality
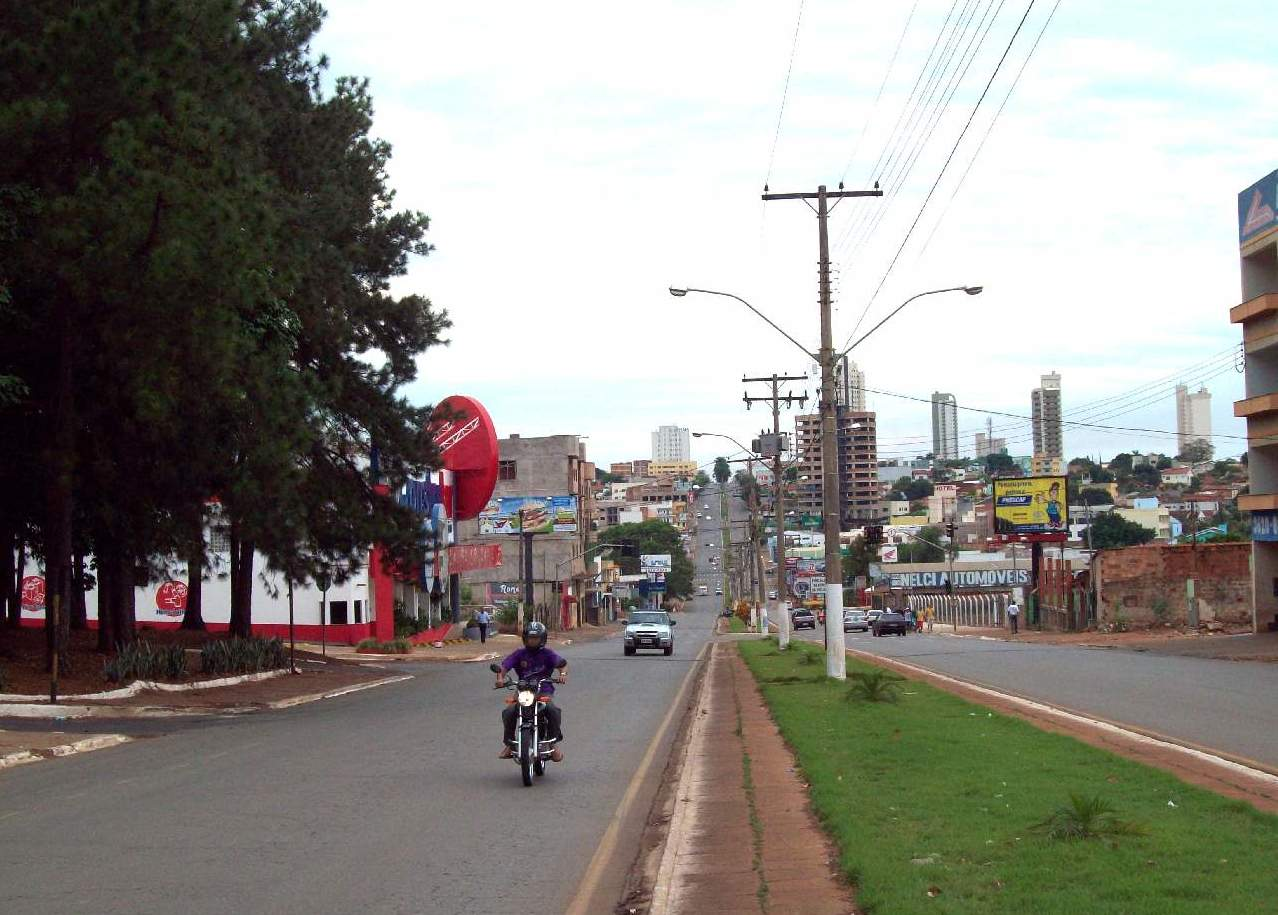
- View of Rio Verde

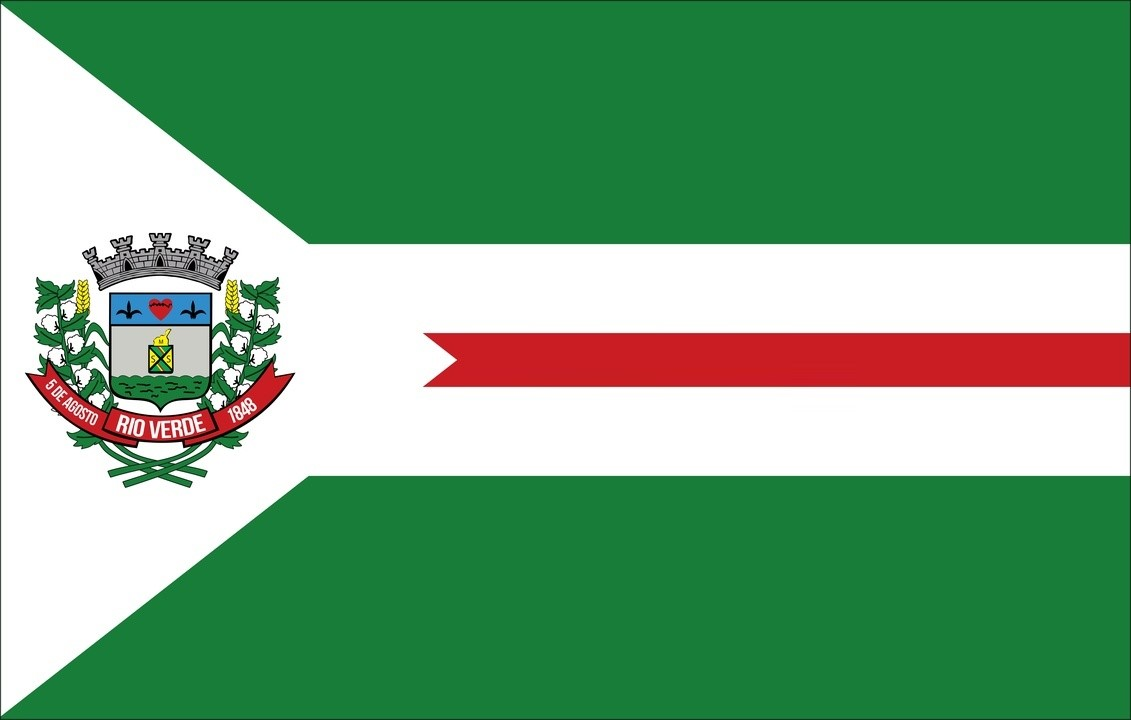
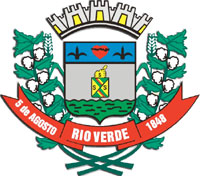
- Flag Coat of arms

- Location in Goiás state

- Location in Brazil
- Coordinates: 17°44′42″S 50°55′00″W
- Country: Brazil
- Region: Central-West
- State: Goiás
- Microregion: Sudoeste de Goiás

Area
  - Total: 8,388.2 km^{2} (3,238.7 sq mi)
- Elevation: 748 m (2,454 ft)

Population (2022 Brazilian census)
  - Total: 225,696
  - Estimate (2025): 241,494
  - Density: 26.906/km^{2} (69.687/sq mi)
- Time zone: UTC−3 (BRT)
- Postal code: 75900-000

Rio Verde is a municipality in the Brazilian state of Goiás. It is a fast-growing center and is the largest producer of grains in the state.

== Geography ==
=== Location ===
It is the center of the Sudoeste de Goiás Microregion, situated at a distance of 229 km (142 mi) from Goiânia, the capital of the state and 420 km (261 mi) from Brasília, the capital of Brazil.

Highway connections from Goiânia and the following other cities; Abadia de Goiás, Guapó, Indiara, Acreúna, and Santo Antônio da Barra are made by BR-060.

The annual average temperature is between 20 °C and 35 °C. Vegetation is mainly cerrado, with some residual forests.

The bordering cities are Aparecida do Rio Doce, Cachoeira Alta, Caiapônia, Castelândia, Jataí, Maurilândia, Montividiu, Paraúna, Quirinópolis, Santa Helena de Goiás, and Santo Antonio da Barra.

Two major federal highways cross the municipality: BR-060, which links Brasília to the state of Acre, and BR-452, which links Rio Verde to Itumbiara, Goiás on the way to São Paulo, SP.

Gal. Leite de Castro Airport is a regional with a paved 1,500-meter runway, with night lighting and a passenger terminal.

=== Climate ===
Climate data for Rio Verde (1981–2010)
Month	Jan	Feb	Mar	Apr	May	Jun	Jul	Aug	Sep	Oct	Nov	Dec	Year
Mean daily maximum °C (°F)	29.2 (84.6)	30.0 (86.0)	29.9 (85.8)	29.7 (85.5)	28.3 (82.9)	28.2 (82.8)	28.6 (83.5)	30.9 (87.6)	32.0 (89.6)	31.8 (89.2)	30.1 (86.2)	29.4 (84.9)	29.8 (85.6)
Daily mean °C (°F)	23.6 (74.5)	23.8 (74.8)	23.7 (74.7)	23.2 (73.8)	21.3 (70.3)	20.7 (69.3)	20.7 (69.3)	22.6 (72.7)	24.2 (75.6)	24.6 (76.3)	23.9 (75.0)	23.5 (74.3)	23.0 (73.4)
Mean daily minimum °C (°F)	19.5 (67.1)	19.4 (66.9)	19.2 (66.6)	18.2 (64.8)	15.7 (60.3)	14.5 (58.1)	14.2 (57.6)	15.4 (59.7)	17.6 (63.7)	19.0 (66.2)	19.1 (66.4)	19.4 (66.9)	17.6 (63.7)
Average precipitation mm (inches)	258.6 (10.18)	211.4 (8.32)	267.1 (10.52)	102.3 (4.03)	37.7 (1.48)	14.7 (0.58)	9.9 (0.39)	13.9 (0.55)	49.5 (1.95)	136.2 (5.36)	239.0 (9.41)	272.6 (10.73)	1,612.9 (63.50)
Average precipitation days (≥ 1.0 mm)	18	15	16	8	3	1	1	2	5	11	15	19	114
Average relative humidity (%)	80.2	78.1	79.0	72.0	66.8	59.9	52.5	45.9	52.9	64.5	73.9	78.8	67.0
Mean monthly sunshine hours	132.5	159.3	171.9	214.2	226.9	224.3	239.9	229.9	175.7	165.3	148.1	78.8	2,166.8
Source: Instituto Nacional de Meteorologia

== History ==
The development of Rio Verde began in 1838 when the government offered a tax exemption for ten years to anyone who would settle in the area. In 1846 lands were donated for the building of the first chapel, Nossa Senhora das Dores. In 1848 it was made a freguesia (parish) with the name Dores de Rio Verde. In 1882 it was elevated to a city.

Mayors of Rio Verde:

- Felipe Santa Cruz: 1st elected mayor of Rio Verder
- Nêgo Portilho: 2nd elected mayor of Rio Verde
- Paulo Campos: Mayor of Rio Verde between 1961 and 1966

== Economy ==
Rio Verde is the largest producer of grains in the state, reaching up to 790 thousand metric tons per year of rice, cotton, soy, maize, sorghum, millet, beans and sunflowers. There is also a considerable production of sugarcane for the extraction of sugar and ethanol. The arable land exceeds 2,300 square kilometres. With 320,000 head (2007), the city has one of the largest cattle herds and is the largest producer of milk in the state, producing 61 million liters per month. It also is a large producer of poultry (11,600,000) and pigs (335,000). Approximately 20 thousand head of cattle are slaughtered per month, supplying both the domestic and international markets (10% of the production is exported).

Agricultural production (2006) in hectares:

- cotton: 2,800
- rice: 2,500
- sugarcane: 5,900
- beans: 5,600
- corn: 59,000
- soybeans: 250,000
- sorghum: 20,000
- wheat: 500

In the agricultural sector there were 2,166 farms in 2006 with a total area of 513,233 hectares, of which 281,871 hectares were planted, 141,289 hectares were in pasture, and 74,187 hectares were in woodland. Farms employed 3,928 workers.

== Education ==
The city is a regional educational center, in all educational levels. There are 32,000 students enrolled in primary and secondary education, in 11 elementary schools, 52 municipal junior and high schools, 19 state junior and high schools and 20 private schools. Vocational education at the secondary level is offered by the Rio Verde campus of IFGoiano, with courses in many knowledge areas; SENAI, with courses in automobile maintenance, electronics, heavy mechanics, computer science, security and administrative support; SENAC, with business management, computer science, fashion and beauty, health care, tourism, social communication and arts. Rio Verde has one university, the Fundação do Ensino Superior do Rio Verde (FESURV), with 13 undergraduate courses in several areas, as well as other colleges, such as Faculdades Objetivo, Faculdade Almeida Rodrigues and IFGoiano - Federal Institute of Education, Science and Technology Goiano.

== Health care ==
Rio Verde is a regional health care center, with 110 physicians and 150 dentists, in all specialties, 26 clinics, two mobile and one airborne intensive care units, and three ambulances. It has also 9 hospitals, 1 hemocenter and 1 municipal emergency care center, 11 ambulatory public health centers, which dispense about 25,000 consultations a month. It has also a Family Medicine Program (PSF), with eight teams.

== Commerce and industry ==
Rio Verde had 242 industries, 1,768 commercial establishments and 1,996 service establishments (statistics of 2007). It has also 5 industrial districts. The largest employer is the Mixed Cooperative of Agricultural Producers of Southwestern Goiás, the first to be founded in the entire Center-West region, ranking among the three largest of the country, with more than 4 thousand employees and generating 1.3 thousand jobs. Rio Verde attracts 62% of the private investments of the state, 60% of the agricultural loans by Banco do Brasil and 15% of the state's agricultural operational funding. The agricultural vocation is expressed by the strong development of agricultural tourism and events, with emphasis on technologies that bring entrepreneurs and researchers from all over of the world.

The city has four radio stations (three FM and one AM), two TV stations, Digital cable TV and two newspapers.

== Quality of Life ==
The municipality is one of the most prosperous in the state. In 2000, Rio Verde earned a score of 0.807 on the UN Human Development Index, ranking it number 1 out of 242 municipalities in the state, and number 44 out of 5,507 municipalities in the country.

== Sister Cities ==
Rio Verde has established partnerships with these cities:

- Adelaide (Australia)
- Haarlem (Netherlands)
- Porto Alegre (Brazil)
- Sacramento (United States)

== See also ==
- List of municipalities in Goiás
- Microregions of Goiás
