= Abadia de Goiás =

- Municipality
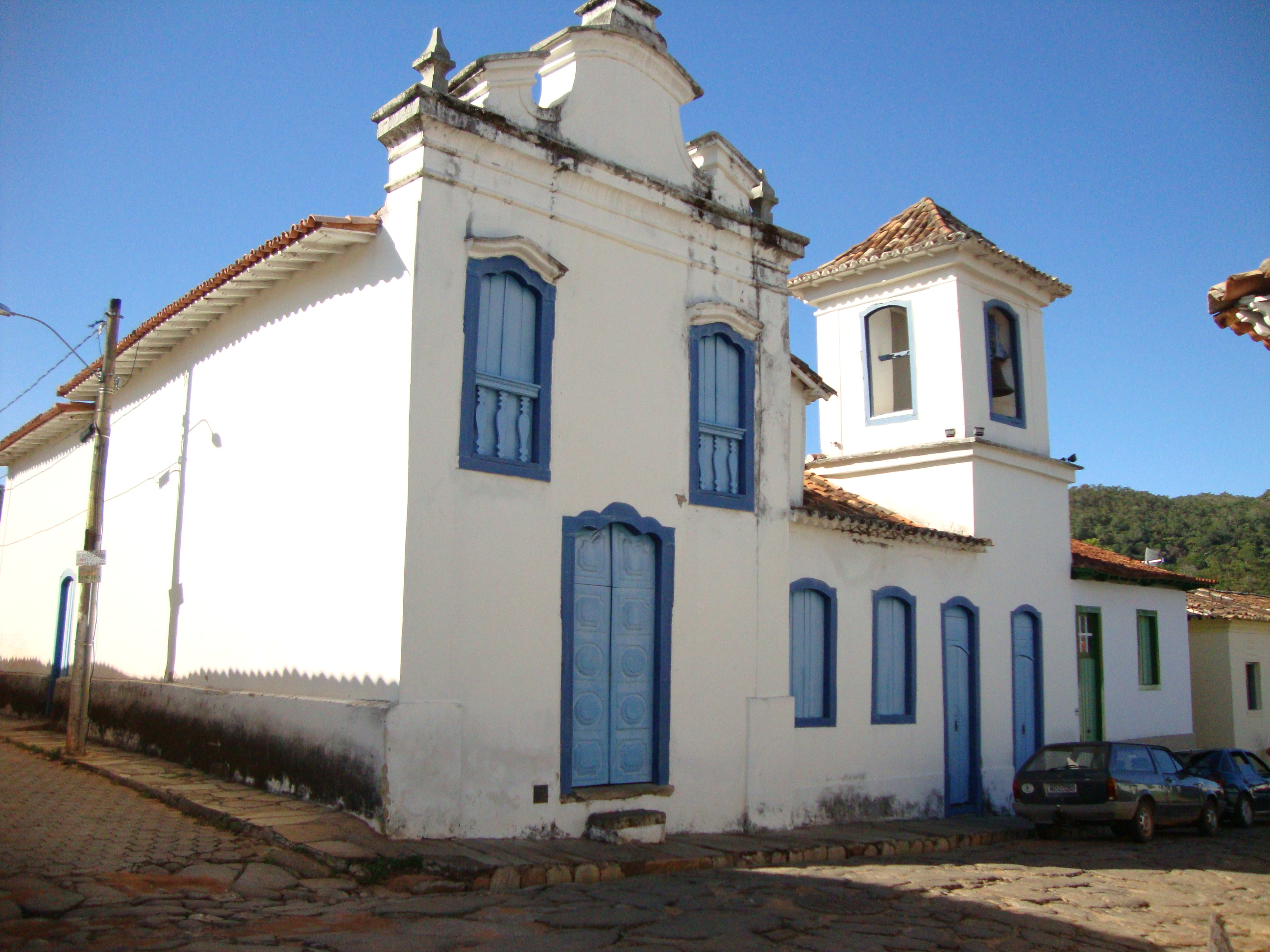
- Church in Abadia de Goias

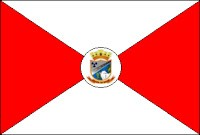
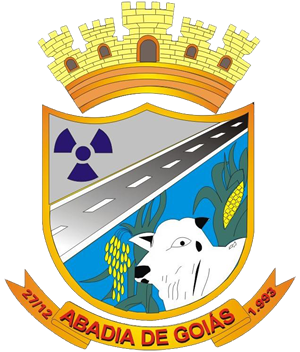
- Flag Coat of arms

- Location in Goiás state

- Location in Brazil
- Coordinates: 16°45′52″S 49°26′13″W
- Country: Brazil
- Region: Central-West
- State: Goiás
- Microregion: Goiânia Microregion

Area
  - Total: 136.9 km^{2} (52.9 sq mi)
- Elevation: 898 m (2,946 ft)

Population (2020)
  - Total: 8,958
  - Density: 65.43/km^{2} (169.5/sq mi)
- Time zone: UTC−3 (BRT)
- Postal code: 75345-000

Abadia de Goiás is a municipality in central Goiás state, Brazil, located on the western edge of the Goiânia metropolitan area. The residues from the Goiânia incident are stored within its territory and, according to the National Nuclear Energy Commission, do not present any level of radioactivity.

== Geographical Data ==
The distance to Goiânia is 27 km. and highway connections are made by BR-060.

Neighboring municipalities are:

- north and east: Trindade
- northwest: Goiânia
- east: Guapó
- south: Aragoiânia

== Demographic and Political Data ==
- Population density: 40.07 inhabitants/km^{2} (2007)
- Urban population: 3,963 (2007)
- Rural population: 1,905 (2007)
- Eligible voters in 2007: 4683
- City government in 2005: mayor (Antomar Moreira dos Santos), vice-mayor (Maria Lúcia das Graças Matias), and 09 councilpersons
- Households: 1,398 (2000)
- Households earning less than 01 minimum salary: 872 (2000)

== Economy ==
The economy is based on services, government jobs, small industries, cattle raising, poultry, and agriculture.

=== Main Enterprises ===
- agriculture: 4 units employing 42 workers
- transformation industry: 13 units employing 53 workers
- construction: 7 units employing 21 workers
- commerce: 57 units employing 142 workers
- real estate: 31 units employing 62 workers
- education: 3 units employing 12 workers
- health: 4 units employing 07 workers
- public administration: 3 units employing 168 workers

(IBGE 2003)

The cattle herd consisted of 17,460 head, of which 1,930 were milking cows (2006). The main agricultural products were rice, manioc, and corn.

== Health and education ==
- Infant mortality rate in 2000: 27.70 (28.50 in 1990)
- Literacy rate in 2000: 89.2

There were no hospitals in 2007. There were 06 schools with an enrollment of 1,810.

Human Development Index: 0.742

- State ranking: 101 (out of 242 municipalities)
- National ranking: 2,112 (out of 5,507 municipalities)

== See also ==
- List of municipalities in Goiás
