= Guapó =

- Municipality
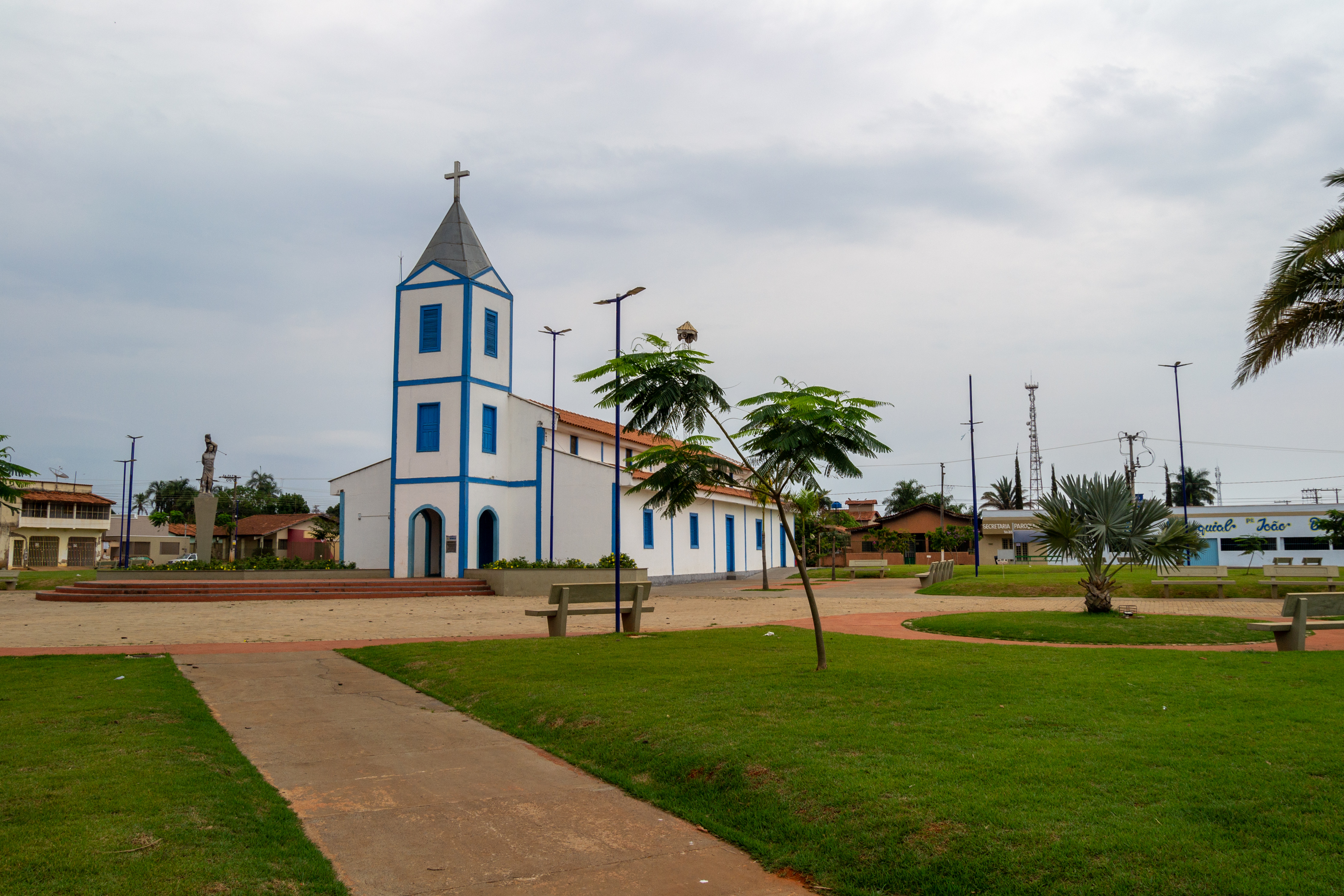

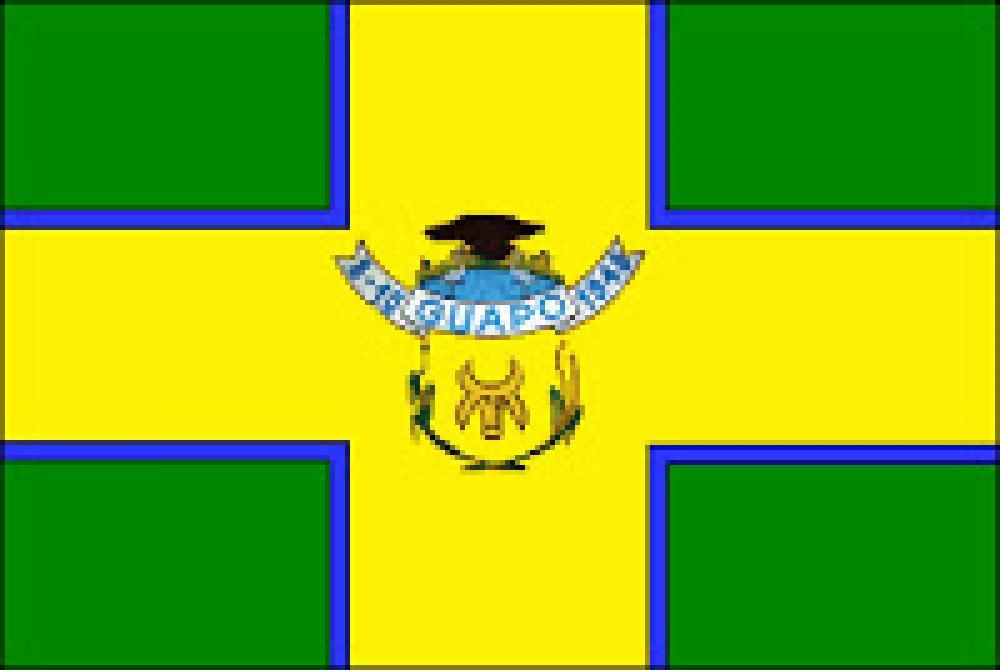
- Flag

- Location in Goiás state

- Location in Brazil
- Coordinates: 16°49′47″S 49°32′07″W
- Country: Brazil
- Region: Central-West
- State: Goiás
- Microregion: Goiânia Microregion

Area
  - Total: 517.0 km^{2} (199.6 sq mi)
- Elevation: 757 m (2,484 ft)

Population (2020)
  - Total: 14,207
  - Density: 27.48/km^{2} (71.17/sq mi)
- Time zone: UTC−3 (BRT)
- Postal code: 75350-000

Guapó (Portuguese: [ɡwaˈpɔ]) is a municipality in central Goiás state, Brazil. The population was 14,207 (2020) and the total area of the municipality was 517.0 km^{2} (10/10/2002).

Guapó is part of the Goiânia Microregion. Neighboring municipalities are:

- north: Trindade
- west: Campestre de Goiás and Varjão
- south: Aragoiânia and Varjão
- east: Aragoiânia and Abadia de Goiás

Guapó is approximately 37 kilometers southwest of Goiânia and is on the BR-060 highway (Goiânia to Rio Verde).

== History ==
The lands where Guapó is located today once belonged to Trindade. Like many towns in Brazil it began with the building of a chapel, in 1905. In 1914 it was elevated to a district with the name São Sebastião do Ribeirão. With the transfer of the new capital in 1935 it was dismembered from Trindade and made part of Goiânia. In 1938 the name was changed to Ribeirão. In 1943 the name was changed again to Guapó and it became a municipality. "Guapó" is of Tupi origin and means "eater of roots".

== Political data ==
- Eligible voters: 9,689 (12/2007)
- Mayor: Colemar Cardoso de Queiroz (January 2005)
- Vice-mayor: Joana Antônia Vieira da Silva (January 2005)
- Councilmembers: 09 (January 2005)

== Demographic data ==
- Population growth rate 2000/2007: -0.29.%
- Population in 1980: 10,028
- Population in 1991: 11,785
- Urban population in 2007: 10,196
- Rural population in 2007: 3,390

== The economy ==
The economy is based on cattle raising and agriculture. In 2006 there were 57.500 cattle of which 6,900 were dairy cows. The main agricultural products in 2006 were bananas, rice, sugarcane, manioc, corn, soybeans, and tomatoes. There was one dairy and one banking establishment. Source: IBGE

== Health and education ==
There were no hospitals in 2007. There were 10 schools with 3,682 students in 2006. The infant mortality rate in 2000 was 25.9, while the literacy rate was 86.6%.

Human Development Index: 0.729

- State ranking: 122 (out of 242 municipalities)
- National ranking: 2,158 (out of 5,507 municipalities)

For the complete list see Frigoletto

== See also ==
- List of municipalities in Goiás
