= Microregions in Goiás =

The state of Goiás showing Mesoregions and Microregions

The state of Goiás is divided into 18 statistical microregions by the Instituto Brasileiro de Geografia e Estatístic (IBGE). These have no administrative function but are used only for statistics. The total area of the state is 341,289 km2 and the population is 5,450,303 as of 2007. Thirty seven percent of the population—2,032,305—lives in the Goiânia Microregion and 17.6%--960,141—of the population lives in the Entorno do Distrito Federal Microregion. The GDP of the state of Goiás was R$50,536 billion in 2005, the last year data was gathered.

== Microregions of Goiás ==
Microregion	Area (km²)	% of the state area (km²)	Inhabitants in 1980	Inhabitants in 2007	% of the state population	GDP (R$1,000.00) in 2005	% of state GDP (R$1,000.00) in 2005
Anápolis	8,387	2.4	350,317	517,221	9.4	3,851,580	7.6
Anicuns	5,483	1.6	101,813	100,759	1.8	694,825	1.3
Aragarças	11,092	3.2	48,346	53,541	0.9	322,068	0.6
Catalão	15,239	4.4	90,159	133,156	2,4	3,352,117	6.6
Ceres	13,224	3.8	190,414	215,820	3.9	1,432,288	2.8
Chapada dos Veadeiros	21,476	6.3	39,814	60,267	1,1	408,374	0.8
Entorno do Distrito Federal	38,212	11.2	259,804	960,141	17,6	4,764,348	9.4
Goiânia	6,848	2.0	863,065	2,032,305	37.2	18,510,977	36.6
Iporá	7,097	2.0	66,349	58,845	1.0	351,519	0.6
Meia Ponte	21,229	6.2	232,807	338,147	6.2	4,033,284	7.9
Pires do Rio	9,450	2.7	69,081	90,327	1.6	788,161	1.5
Porangatu	35,287	10.3	198,609	220,794	4.0	1,874,454	3,7
Quirinópolis	16,118	4.7	86,242	95,094	1.7	1,520,155	3.0
Rio Vermelho	20,277	5.9	87,039	86,362	1,5	663,131	1.3
São Miguel do Araguaia	24,472	7.2	61,463	76,625	1.4	696,474	1.3
Sudoeste de Goiás	56,293	16.5	224,540	397,387	7.3	5,497,824	10.8
Vale do Rio dos Bois	13,654	4.0	82,414	107,317	1.9	1,336,258	2.6
Vão do Paranã	17,453	5.1	68,849	102,927	1.8	438,245	0.8
