= Petrolina de Goiás =

- Municipality
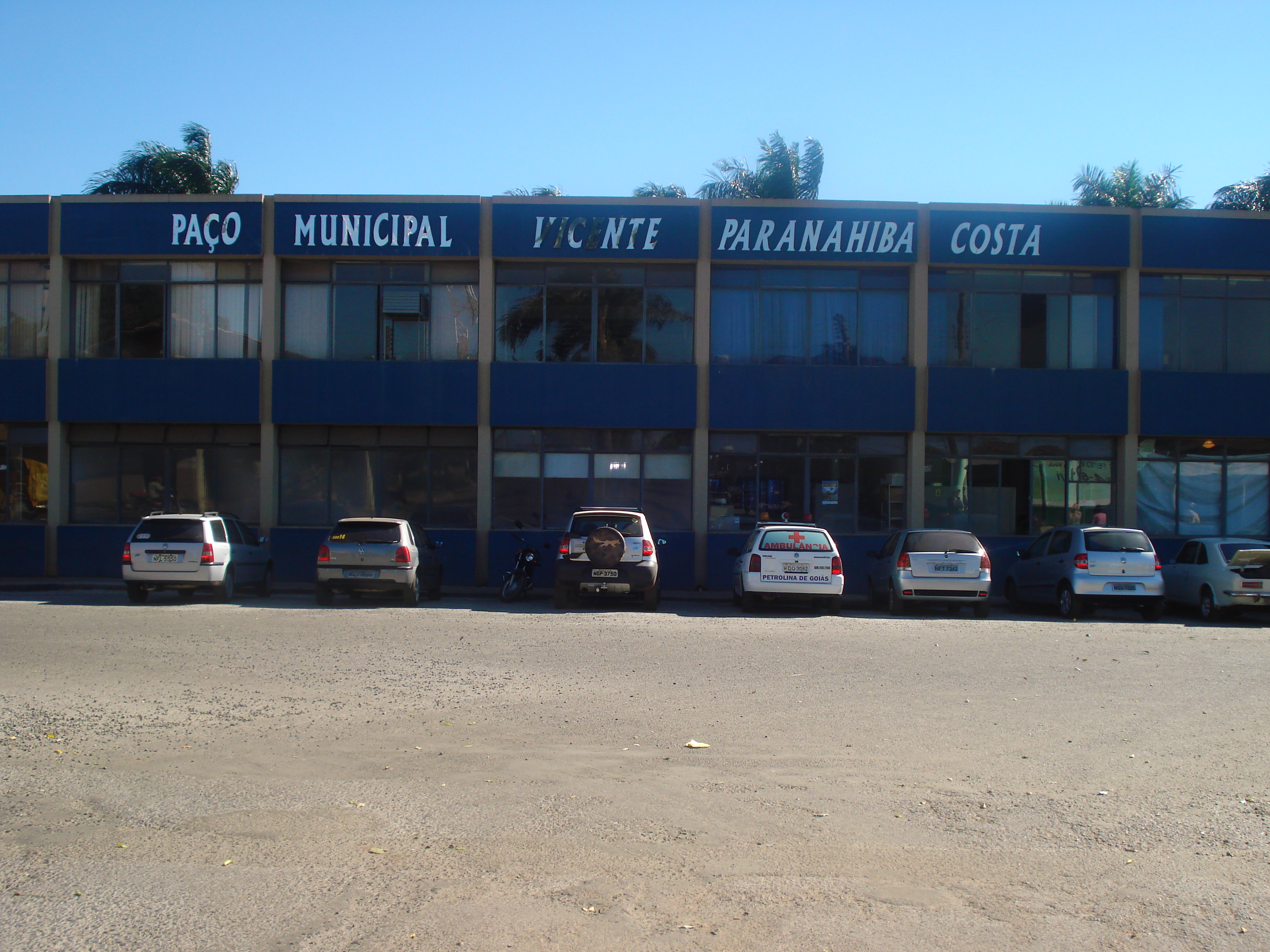

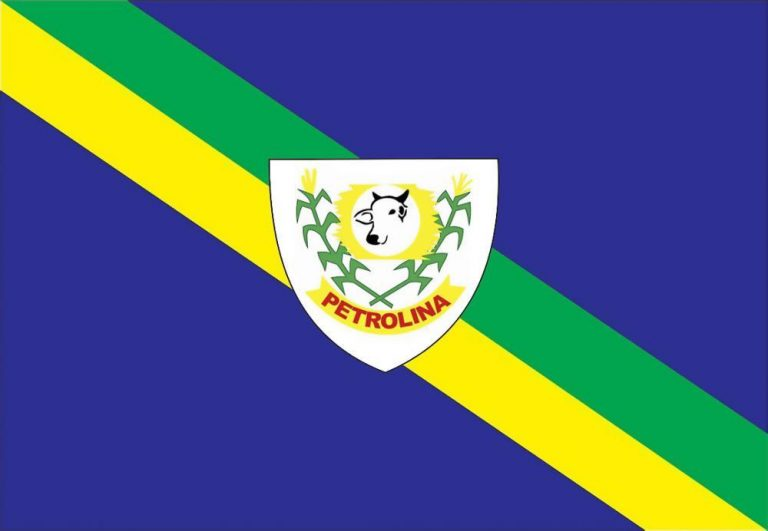
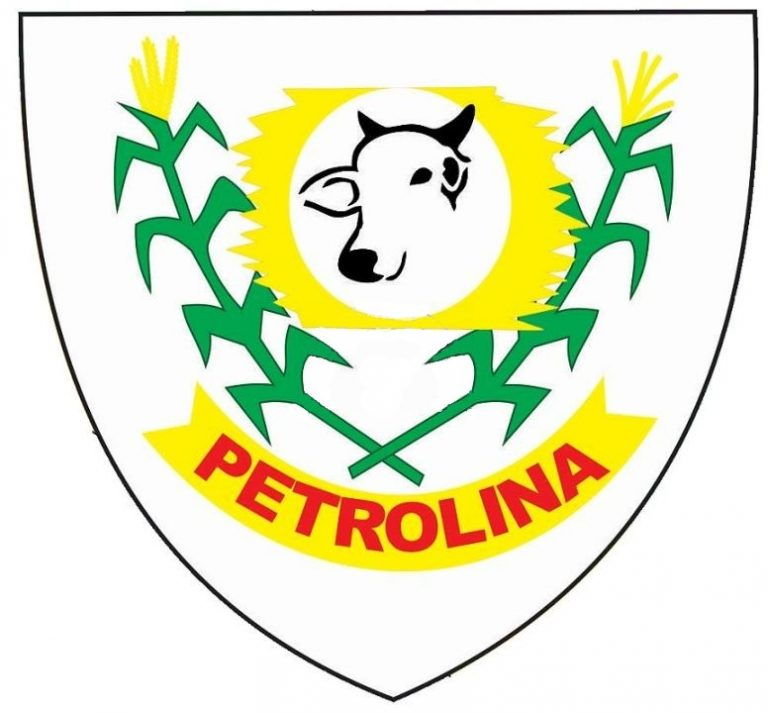
- Flag Coat of arms

- Location in Goiás state

- Location in Brazil
- Coordinates: 16°05′43″S 49°20′12″W
- Country: Brazil
- Region: Central-West
- State: Goiás
- Microregion: Anápolis Microregion

Area
  - Total: 540.4 km^{2} (208.6 sq mi)
- Elevation: 720 m (2,360 ft)

Population (2020)
  - Total: 10,261
  - Density: 18.99/km^{2} (49.18/sq mi)
- Time zone: UTC−3 (BRT)
- Postal code: 75480-000

Petrolina de Goiás is a municipality in central Goiás state, Brazil.

== Location ==
Petrolina de Goiás is located 81 km. almost due north of Goiânia, the state capital. It is 23 km. southwest of São Francisco de Goiás, 23 km. northwest of Ouro Verde de Goiás, 21 km. north of Damolândia, and 23 km. east of Santa Rosa de Goiás.

- Distance to regional center (Anápolis): 54 km.
- Highway connections from Goiânia: state highway GO-80 north from Goiânia, through Nova Veneza and Ouro Verde de Goiás, and then 23 kilometers northeast. Distancias Rodoviarias

Neighboring municipalities: Santa Rosa de Goiás, Jesúpolis, São Francisco de Goiás, and Ouro Verde de Goiás, Pirenópolis, Inhumas and Itauçu.

== History ==
Petrolina de Goiás owes its origin to the fertility of the soils of the basin of the Córrego Descoberto. Joaquim Pedro and his family donated lands in 1919 to create the settlement and build a chapel to honour Santa Maria Eterna. The first name was "Descoberto" but this was changed to "Petrolina" in honour of the founder, Pedro. In 1932 it became a district in the municipality of Jaraguá. In 1943 the name was changed to "Goialina", only to be changed again in 1948 to Petrolina de Goiás.

== Demographics ==
- Population density: 18.25 inhabitants/km^{2} (2007)
- Total population in 2007: 9,864
- Total population in 1980: 12,153
- Population growth rate: -0.37% for 1996/2007
- Urban population: 6,506
- Rural population: 3,358

== The economy ==
The economy is based on agriculture, cattle raising, services, public administration, and small transformation industries.

- Number of industrial establishments: 16
- Number of retail establishments: 69
- Dairies: Coop. Agropecuária Regional Rio das Almas Ltda. (22/05/2006)
- Banking establishments: Banco do Brasil S.A., Banco Itaú S.A.
- Automobiles: 991

The cattle herd had 61,800 head in 2007. The main crops cultivated were pineapples, garlic, rice, bananas, manioc, corn, and tomatoes.

Agricultural data 2006

- Number of Farms: 1,015
- Total area: 38,443 ha.
- Area of permanent crops: 1,402 ha. (coconuts, bananas, citrus fruits)
- Area of perennial crops: 4,635 ha. (corn, beans, and rice)
- Area of natural pasture: 27,146 ha.
- Area of woodland and forests: 5,443 ha.
- Persons dependent on farming: 1,400
- Farms with tractors: 123
- Number of tractors: 132 IBGE

== Education and Health ==
There were 9 schools and 2,560 students in 2006. The adult literacy rate was 82.0% (2000) (the national average was 86.4%). There was one hospital with 23 beds in 2007. The infant mortality rate was 18.74 (2000) (the national average was 33.0).

Ranking on the Municipal Human Development Index

- MHDI: 0.733
- State ranking: 133 (out of 242 municipalities)
- National ranking: 2.356 (out of 5,507 municipalities)

All data are from 2000

== See also ==
- List of municipalities in Goiás
- Microregions of Goiás
