= Uruana =

- Municipality
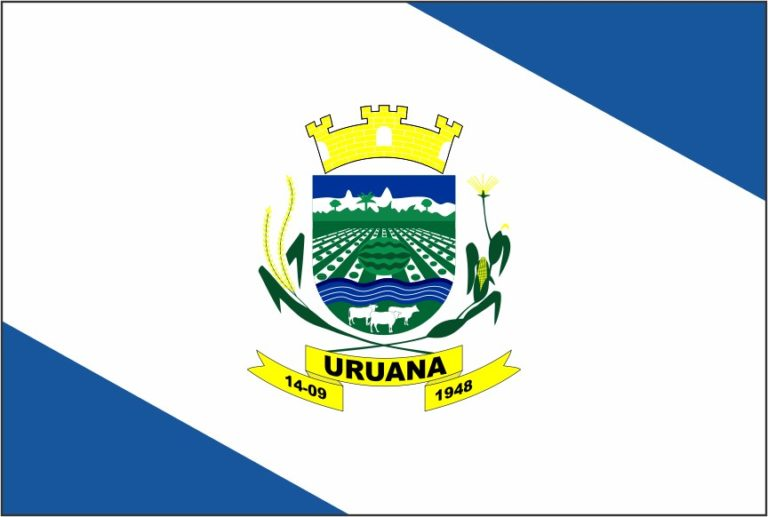
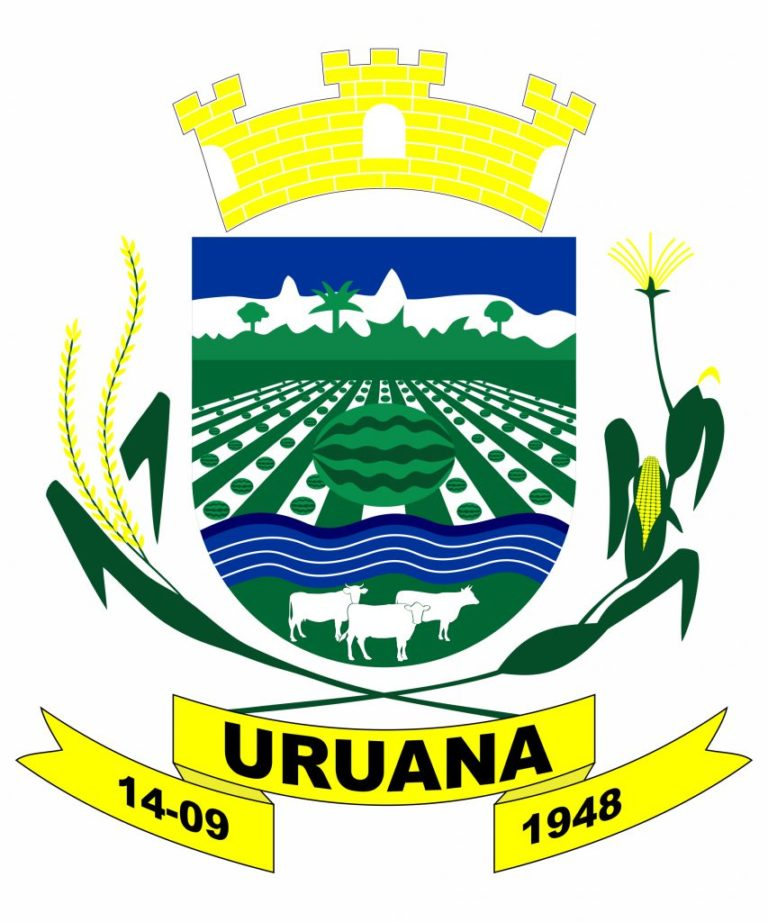
- Flag Coat of arms

- Location in Goiás state

- Location in Brazil
- Coordinates: 15°29′54″S 49°41′27″W
- Country: Brazil
- Region: Central-West
- State: Goiás
- Microregion: Ceres Microregion

Area
  - Total: 522.1 km^{2} (201.6 sq mi)
- Elevation: 586 m (1,923 ft)

Population (2020)
  - Total: 13,818
  - Density: 26.47/km^{2} (68.55/sq mi)
- Time zone: UTC−3 (BRT)
- Postal code: 76335-000

Uruana is a municipality in central Goiás state, Brazil. It is known statewide as the watermelon capital of the state.

== Location ==
Uruana is located 36 km. southwest of Ceres. It is 25 km. west of the highway junction with BR-153 at Rianápolis.

- Highway access from Goiânia: GO-070 / Goianira / Inhumas / Itauçu / GO-154 / Itaguaru / Uruíta. Uruana is 25 km west of BR-153. See Seplan

Uruana has boundaries with:

- North: Carmo do Rio Verde
- South: Itaberaí and Itaguaru
- East: Rianápolis and Jaraguá
- West: Heitoraí and Itapuranga

Uruana is located on the east bank of the Rio Uru. The most important rivers are the Uru, das Almas, and the Sucuri. The Uru provides water for the town and forms the dividing line between Uruana and Itapuranga and Carmo do Rio Verde

== Demographics ==
- Population density: 4.35 inhabitants/km^{2} (2007)
- Population growth rate: -0.46%
- Population in 1980: 7,138
- Population in 2007: 13,712
- Urban population in 2007: 11,822
- Rural population in 2007: 1,890
- Population in 2008: 12,827
- Urban population in 2008: 10,979
- Rural population in 2008: 1,848

== Economic information ==
The economy is based on subsistence agriculture, cattle raising, services, public administration, and small transformation industries. There were 23 industrial units (2006), 124 retail units (2007), and 02 banking establishments (2007). In 2006 there were 549 farms. Out of the 37,000 hectares of total land 26,000 hectares was pasture land. The cattle herd had 60,000 head in 2006 and the main crops were pineapple, rice (2,000 hectares), bananas, coconuts, sugarcane (1,300 hectares), watermelon (3,000 hectares), beans, manioc, corn (3,000 hectares), soybeans, and tomatoes.

== Education and Health ==
There were 18 schools with 3,682 students in 2006. The adult literacy rate was 86.7% (2000) (national average was 86.4%). In the health sector there was 01 hospital with 27 beds in 2007.

- Infant mortality rate: 17.56 (2000) (national average was 33.0).
- MHDI: 0.758
- State ranking: 63 (out of 242 municipalities in 2000)
- National ranking: 1,656 (out of 5,507 municipalities in 2000)

For the complete list see frigoletto.com.br

== Tourism ==
Uruana is a large producer of watermelon and puts on a festival called the Festa da Melancia (Watermelon Festival), with a parade of schools, producers, and floats, together with dances. A girl is chosen to be Queen of the Watermelon and samples of the fruit are handed out to the visitors.

== Climate ==
Uruana has a tropical semi moist, and dry and warm in winter (cold night and warm days) and hot and humid in summer.

→ Winter temperatures: low: 11 °C/high: 31 °C;

→ Spring temperatures: low: 19 °C/high: 35 °C;

→ Summer temperatures: low: 21 °C/high: 29 °C;

→ Autumn temperatures: low: 15 °C/high: 28 °C.

== See also ==
- List of municipalities in Goiás
- Microregions of Goiás
