= Itaguari =

- Municipality
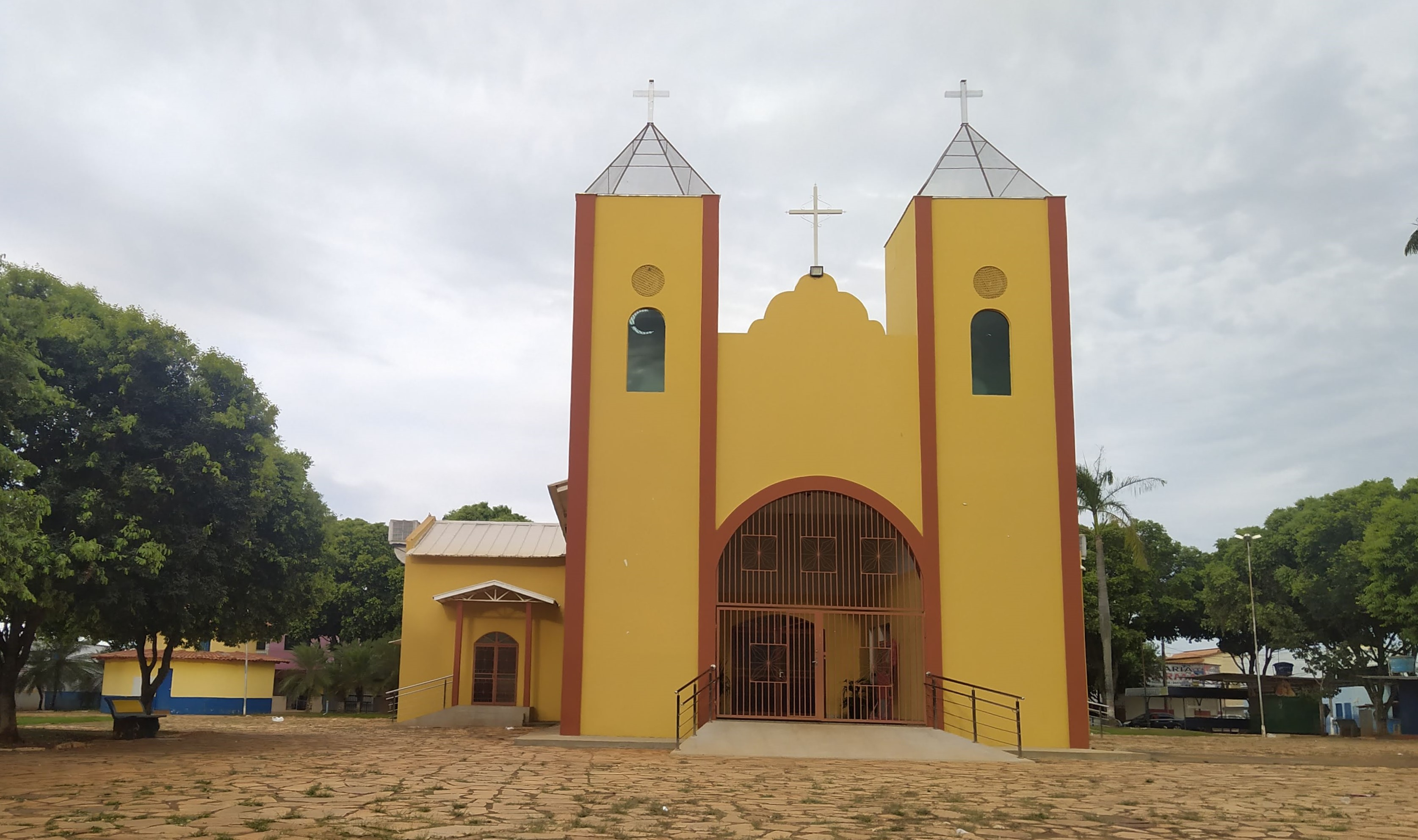

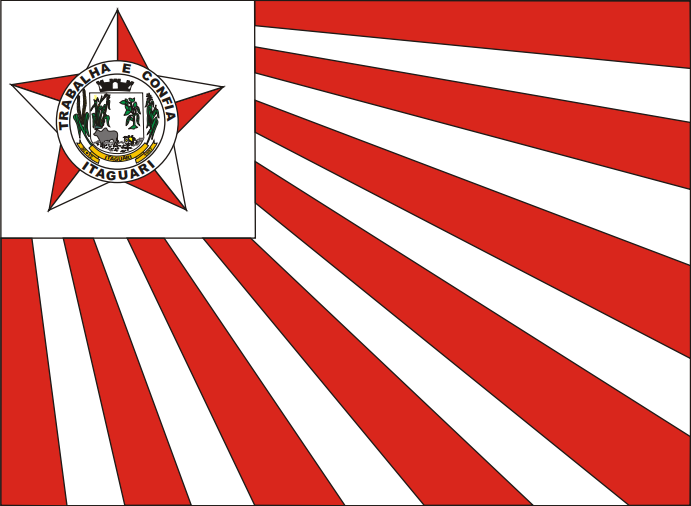
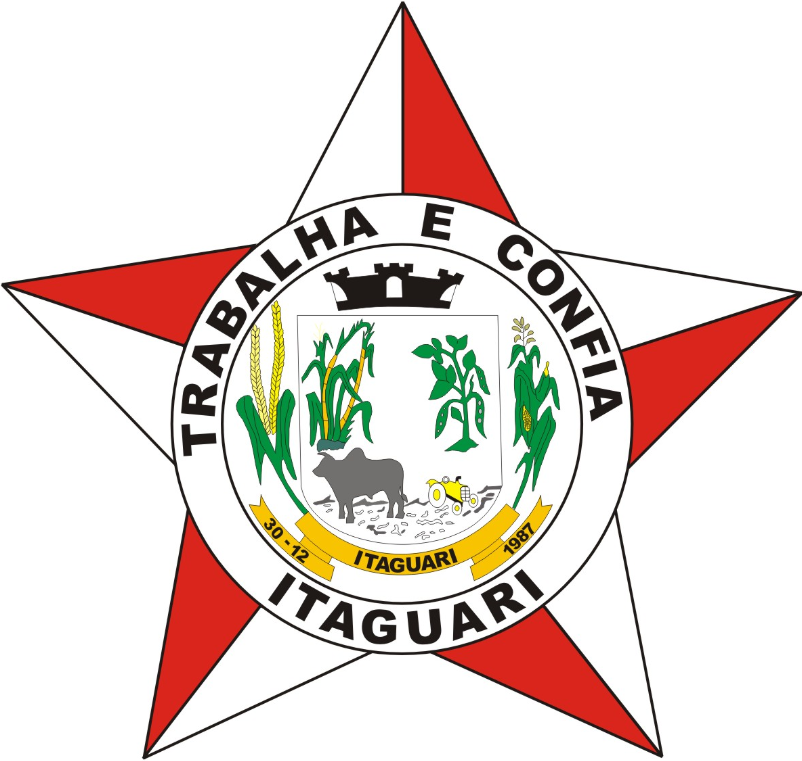
- Flag Coat of arms

- Location in Goiás state

- Location in Brazil
- Coordinates: 15°54′57″S 49°36′01″W
- Country: Brazil
- Region: Central-West
- State: Goiás
- Microregion: Anápolis Microregion

Area
  - Total: 135.5 km^{2} (52.3 sq mi)
- Elevation: 687 m (2,254 ft)

Population (2020)
  - Total: 4,685
  - Density: 34.58/km^{2} (89.55/sq mi)
- Time zone: UTC−3 (BRT)
- Postal code: 76650-000

Itaguari is a municipality in central Goiás state, Brazil.

== Location and Connections ==
The distance to the state capital is 109 km (68 mi)., while the distance to the regional center (Anápolis) is 116 km (72 mi). Highway connections are made by state highway GO-070 from Goiânia to Goianira / Inhumas / Itauçu / GO-154 / Taquaral de Goiás. For a list of all the distances in the state of Goiás see Seplan

Neighboring municipalities are Itaberaí, Itaguaru, Jaraguá, and Taquaral de Goiás

== Demographics ==
- Population density: 31.39 inhabitants/km^{2} (2007)
- Number of voters: 3,556 (December/2007)
- Population growth rate: -0.15% 1996/2007
- Urban population: 3,653 (2007)
- Rural population: 601

== The economy ==
The main economic activities are cattle raising (24,600 head in 2006) and agriculture (rice, sugarcane, corn, and tomatoes).

- Number of industrial establishments: 7
- Number of retail establishments: 35
- Banking establishments: none
- Dairies: Laticínios Ramos Ltda., LAI - Laticínios e Agropecuária Itaguari Ltda. (22/05/2006)
- Automobiles: 461

Agricultural data 2006

- Farms: 315
- Total area: 11,282 ha.
- Area of permanent crops: 336 ha. (bananas)
- Area of perennial crops: 431 ha. (rice, tomatoes, corn, sugarcane, and manioc)
- Area of natural pasture: 9,304 ha.
- Area of woodland and forests: 1,134 ha.
- Persons dependent on farming: 650
- Farms with tractors: 14
- Number of tractors: 20
- Cattle herd: 24,600 head IBGE

== Health and education ==
- Hospitals: none
- Hospital beds: n/a
- Health establishments (Sistema Único de Saúde-SUS): 3
- Schools: 3
- Classrooms: 30
- Teachers: 51
- Number of students: 1,159
- Infant mortality rate: 82.1
- Literacy rate: 28.8

Human Development Index

Itaguai scored 0.720 on the Municipal Human Development Index, giving it a state ranking of 175 (out of 242 municipalities in 2000) and a national ranking of 2,627 (out of 5,507 municipalities in 2000). For the complete list see Frigoletto

== See also ==
- List of municipalities in Goiás
- Microregions of Goiás
