= Itaguaru =

- Municipality
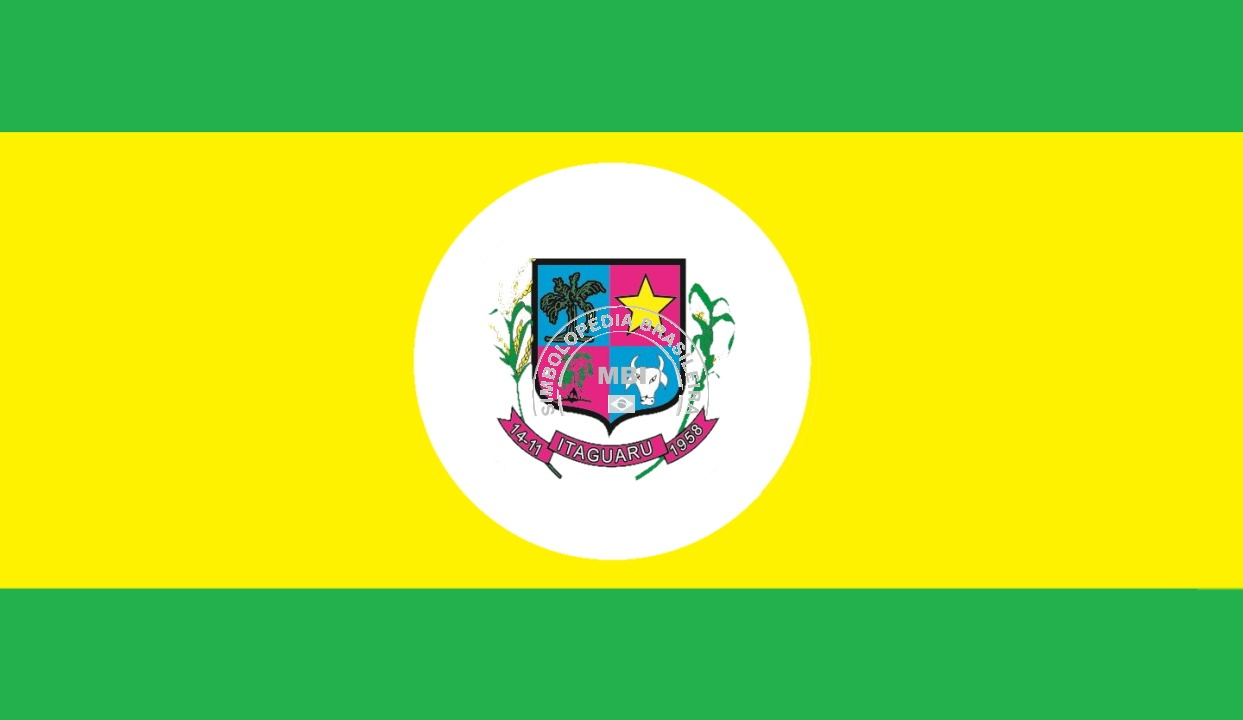
- Flag

- Location in Goiás state

- Location in Brazil
- Coordinates: 15°45′39″S 49°37′55″W
- Country: Brazil
- Region: Central-West
- State: Goiás
- Microregion: Anápolis Microregion

Area
  - Total: 239.9 km^{2} (92.6 sq mi)
- Elevation: 770 m (2,530 ft)

Population (2020)
  - Total: 5,206
  - Density: 21.70/km^{2} (56.20/sq mi)
- Time zone: UTC−3 (BRT)
- Postal code: 76660-000

Itaguaru is a municipality in central Goiás state, Brazil.

== Location ==
The distance to the regional center of (Anápolis) is 127 km. Highway connections are made by GO-070 / Goianira / Inhumas / Itauçu / GO-154 / Taquaral de Goiás / Itaguari. For a complete list of distances in the state of Goiás see Seplan

Neighboring municipalities are Jaraguá, Itaguari, Itaberaí and Uruana

== Demographics ==
- Demographic Density: 22.79 inhabitants/km^{2} (2007)
- Number of voters: 4,924 (December/2007)
- Population growth rate: 0.12% 1996/2007
- Total population (2007): 5,467
- Total population (1980): 7,130
- Urban population (2007): 4,288
- Rural population (2007): 1,179

== The economy ==
The economy is based on services, small industries, cattle raising (32,000 head in 2004), and modest agriculture.

- Number of industrial establishments: 15
- Number of retail establishments: 50
- Banking establishments: Banco do Brasil S.A. (August/2007)
- Dairies: Divino Cézar Ribeiro e Cia Ltda. (22/05/2006)
- Number of automobiles: 582

Agricultural data 2006

- Farms: 489
- Total area: 12,133 ha.
- Area of permanent crops: 3,530 ha. (bananas with 1,100 ha. hearts of palm, and coffee)
- Area of perennial crops: 431 ha.
- Area of natural pasture: 7,323 ha.
- Area of woodland and forests: 652 ha.
- Persons dependent on farming: 1,200
- Farms with tractors: 25
- Number of tractors: 34
- Cattle herd: 32,000 head IBGE

== Health and education ==
- Hospitals: 2 (2007)
- Hospital beds: 40
- Health clinics (Sistema Único de Saúde): 1
- Schools: 5 (2006)
- Classrooms: 34
- Teachers: 80
- Number of students: 1,540
- Infant mortality rate: 26.30
- Literacy rate: 86.0

Itaguaru had a ranking of 0.746 (2000) on the Municipal Human Development Index, giving it a state ranking of 90 (out of 242 municipalities) and a national ranking of 1,997 (out of 5,505 municipalities). For the complete list see frigoletto.com.br

== See also ==
- List of municipalities in Goiás
- Microregions of Goiás
