= Novabrasil Fortaleza =

Novabrasil Fortaleza (ZYC 421)
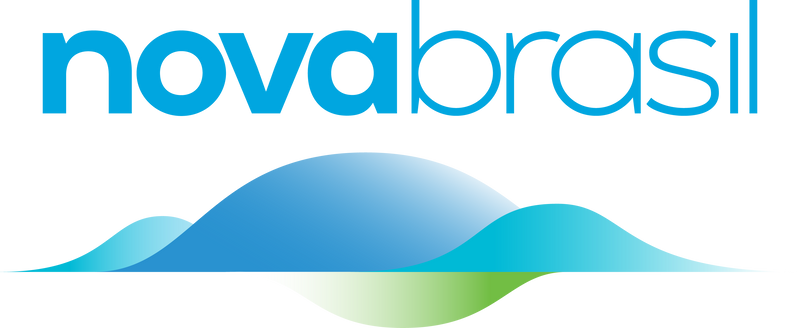

Fortaleza, Ceará; Brazil
- Frequency: 106.5 MHz

Programming
- Language: Portuguese
- Format: Music; Adult contemporary; MPB
- Affiliations: Novabrasil

Ownership
- Owner: Calypso FM Ltda.
- Operator: Grupo de Comunicação O Povo
- Sister stations: Rádio O Povo CBN; Clube FM Fortaleza; Canal FDR

History
- First air date: 1990
- Former names: Calypso FM; Mucuripe FM
- Former frequencies: 106.7 MHz

Technical information
- Licensing authority: ANATEL
- Class: A3
- ERP: 26.3 kW

Links
- Public license information: Profile
- Webcast: Listen live

Novabrasil Fortaleza (ZYC 421) is a Brazilian radio station licensed to Fortaleza, Ceará, serving the respective metropolitan area. It is part of a pool of companies called Grupo de Comunicação O Povo and was founded in 1990 as Calypso FM, renamed Mucuripe FM in 2015 (with a change of frequency and technical adjustments). The station has operated in the Adult contemporary format since its inauguration, adopting MPB as its only genre since its affiliation with the Novabrasil radio network in 2018.

== History ==
The last visual identity of Calypso FM, which remained on the air until 2015.

Radio Calypso FM was inaugurated in 1990 by the group that runs Colégio Christus, with a shareholding by politician Lúcio Alcântara, and its musical programming consisted of adult-contemporary and MPB genres. Grupo de Comunicação O Povo, through the Sistema O Povo de Rádios, became responsible for the artistic side. Its initial frequency was 106.7 MHz.

In July 2015, after a technical adjustment defined in conjunction with ANATEL, the station announced a change in its frequency. In a statement released at the end of the month, the radio station's management said that the change would take place on August 10 and that it would be renamed Mucuripe FM, keeping the programming and its announcers, considering it to be an "evolution of Calypso". In order to choose the new name, an audience survey was carried out and it was found that "Mucuripe", which comes from the cove of the same name, stood out in relation to the name used by the station. Its last broadcast took place on August 9, 2015. At midnight on August 10, 2015, the 106.7 MHz frequency went off the air and, minutes later, the new programming went on the air on 106.5 MHz. With the shift, the radio had its technical size changed, leaving class B1 to start work as A3, increasing its power in the metropolitan area. The official debut took place at 10am on the same day.

In August 2018, the debut of the Novabrasil FM radio network in Fortaleza was confirmed, replacing Mucuripe FM and scheduled for September 13. At the end of the month, the station stopped using the name Mucuripe FM and switched to music. The official premiere took place on the scheduled date, at midnight, with the start of the broadcast in conjunction with the network. From the launch, the station began to focus on MPB as its central musical program.
