= Novabrasil =

Brazilian radio network

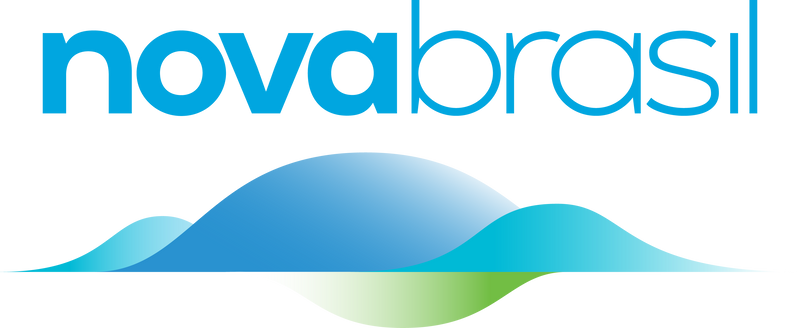
- Type: Broadcast radio network
- Country: Brazil
- Headquarters: São Paulo, São Paulo

Programming
- Language(s): Portuguese
- Format: Music; Adult contemporary; MPB

Ownership
- Owner: Rede Central de Comunicação Ltda.
- Operator: Grupo Thathi de Comunicação
- Key people: Chaim Zaher

History
- Founded: June 1, 2000 by Orestes Quércia
- Former names: Novabrasil FM

Links
- Website: novabrasilfm.com.br

Novabrasil is a Brazilian radio network based in the city of São Paulo, with affiliates in the Southeast, Northeast and Midwest regions of Brazil. The network belongs to Grupo Thathi de Comunicação, launched on June 1, 2000, following the acquisition of the former Manchete FM network stations by businessman Orestes Quércia (incorporated into Organizações Sol Panamby). The station was created as a music format network exclusively for MPB, focused on the latest in the genre and new artists, emphasized in its initial slogan "Moderna e brasileira" ("Modern and Brazilian"). With its acquisition by the Grupo Thathi in 2020, the network became a multimedia platform for Brazilian culture and journalism.

== History ==
The embryo of the project for a network of stations run by Organizações Sol Panamby on FM emerged in 1996, when Nova FM in Campinas began repeating the programming of Nova FM in São Paulo. Both had adult contemporary programming, and the Campinas station was the group's first acquisition, having already been working in this format since 1985. In September 1999, an article in Folha de S.Paulo revealed that businessman Orestes Quércia had bought the five stations that made up the Manchete FM network (São Paulo, Rio de Janeiro, Brasília, Salvador and Recife) for 8 million dollars. At the time, they were leased to the Reborn in Christ Church, which was already arranging a new frequency to operate its network, Manchete Gospel FM.

Initially, they considered launching a network with popular programming, but declined due to the competition that already existed. The idea of launching a Brazilian music radio station (focused on contemporary MPB) arose when Musical FM in São Paulo became a rental radio station, renting out its schedules to various evangelical congregations. With the gap left, the decision was made to launch a network for the MPB market. The name chosen for this network was NovaBrasil FM and its official inauguration took place at midnight on June 1, 2000, initially for São Paulo and Campinas (replacing the two stations that already belonged to Organizações Sol Panamby). Gradually, the network took over the stations that belonged to the Grupo Bloch, debuting its Rio de Janeiro branch on November 1, 2000. The Brasília branch went on the air next, and in March 2002, the Salvador and Recife stations went on the air.

With the debut of the new programming in São Paulo, the audience grew by 54%, with an average of 24,200 listeners in the first three months. In the other cities, there was an increase in the audience among classes A and B. However, the network ceased broadcasting in Rio de Janeiro in October 2002, after leasing it to the then recently launched Nossa Rádio, a station owned by the missionary R. R. Soares. It is currently the second largest radio network in Brazil in the adult contemporary segment in all three indices (affiliates, audience and revenue, except for the audience in SP, which by a small margin surpasses Antena 1), and it is the largest if the "Brazilian music" factor is taken into account, since its competitors are generally local and/or educational stations. On June 4, 2016, NovaBrasil FM in Campinas left the network's project and renamed itself Nova FM, this time taking on an adult contemporary project mixing traditional MPB with international hits.

On September 11, 2017, NovaBrasil FM began a national expansion project and opened its first affiliate in the city of Birigui, in the interior of São Paulo state. At the end of the first half of 2018, the expansion progressed with the opening of an affiliate in Goiânia, Goiás, the first capital city in this phase. Subsequently, it resumed work in Rio de Janeiro and inaugurated its international affiliate in Lisbon, Portugal. And on September 13, in partnership with Grupo de Comunicação O Povo, NovaBrasil FM debuted in Fortaleza, Ceará, operating on the 106.5 MHz frequency, taking the place of Mucuripe FM. On January 2, 2019, NovaBrasil FM debuts another affiliate, now in Aracaju, Sergipe, belonging to the Atalaia Communication System, on the 93.5 MHz frequency. In April, the network launches an affiliate in Teresina, Piauí, but it only lasts two months on air. That same year, in August, an affiliate was announced in Maceió, Alagoas, through the migration of Rádio Palmares AM 800, which has been off the air since 2018.

In October 2020, the sale of the NovaBrasil FM network and the other media companies of the Grupo Solpanamby to the Grupo Thathi de Comunicação, owned by businessman Chaim Zaher, based in Ribeirão Preto, was confirmed. The new management took over the following month. On December 1, 2020, radio stations Cultura FM, Nova FM and Thathi FM, from Araçatuba, Campinas and Ribeirão Preto, respectively, were incorporated into the NovaBrasil FM network, becoming its own stations, while the affiliate based in Birigui left the network and began to broadcast Play FM. In 2022, the former Birigui affiliate was acquired by the Grupo Thathi, returning to broadcasting as NovaBrasil FM, aimed at the city of Araçatuba, causing Cultura FM to return to the other station controlled by the conglomerate.

As the Grupo Thathi began to invest in the station, NovaBrasil FM became an audiovisual platform, expanding its operations to video platforms and investing in spoken programs aimed at its segmentation (Brazilian culture) and also in journalistic products. With this, the network adopted the name "Novabrasil". In November 2024, the radio network consolidated these changes by inaugurating a new headquarters in São Paulo, located in the Brooklin area. The address houses all areas of the radio operation, including two floors planned for studios, one dedicated to live broadcasts, while the other is dedicated to recording podcasts, videocasts, musical performances and special projects.

== Stations ==
Call sign	Frequency	Trade name	Headquarters / City of license	First air date
ZYD 801	89.7 MHz	Novabrasil São Paulo	São Paulo	June 1, 2000
ZYD 472	89.5 MHz	Novabrasil Rio	Rio de Janeiro	2000; 2018
ZYC 476	97.5 MHz	Novabrasil Brasília	Brasília	2001
ZYC 308	104.7 MHz	Novabrasil Salvador	Salvador	March 2000
ZYD 241	94.3 MHz	Novabrasil Recife	Recife	March 2000
ZYD 810	103.7 MHz	Novabrasil Campinas	Campinas	June 1, 2000; December 1, 2020
ZYD 852	90.1 MHz	Novabrasil Araçatuba	Araçatuba / Birigui	September 11, 2017; 2022
ZYD 988	91.3 MHz	Novabrasil Ribeirão Preto	Ribeirão Preto / Cravinhos	December 1, 2020
ZYD 780	93.5 MHz	Novabrasil Aracaju	Aracaju	January 2, 2019
ZYC 421	106.5 MHz	Novabrasil Fortaleza	Fortaleza	September 13, 2018
ZYS 320	106.5 MHz	Novabrasil Maceió	Maceió	2019
ZYN 118	100.5 MHz	Novabrasil Mantiqueira	Andradas	2024

=== Former stations ===
Call sign	Frequency	Trade name	Headquarters / City of license	Current status/affiliation	Transmission period
ZYD 852	95.5 MHz	Novabrasil FM Araçatuba	Araçatuba	Replaced by Cultura FM.	2020–2022
ZYR 262	92.1 MHz	NovaBrasil FM Goiânia	Goiânia / Nova Veneza	Radio Maria Brasil, broadcasting on 99.9 MHz.	2019–2020
ZYL 229	97.5 MHz	NovaBrasil FM Teresina	Teresina	Rádio CV Mais	2019
ZYC 571	102.9 MHz	NovaBrasil FM Goiânia	Goiânia / Trindade	Replaced by 89 FM A Rádio Rock Goiânia.	2018–2019
CSB 654	95.3 MHz	NovaBrasil FM Lisboa	Lisbon, Portugal	Replaced by Tropical FM.	2018–2019
