= Santa Rosa de Goiás =

- Municipality
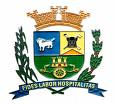
- Coat of arms

- Location in Goiás state

- Location in Brazil
- Coordinates: 16°05′12″S 49°29′38″W
- Country: Brazil
- Region: Central-West
- State: Goiás

Area
  - Total: 170.9 km^{2} (66.0 sq mi)
- Elevation: 1,040 m (3,410 ft)

Population (2020)
  - Total: 2,252
  - Density: 13.18/km^{2} (34.13/sq mi)
- Time zone: UTC−3 (BRT)
- Postal code: 75455-000

Santa Rosa de Goiás is a municipality in central Goiás state, Brazil.

== Location ==
Santa Rosa is located 78 km. northwest of the regional center, Anápolis. It is approximately half the distance between Taquaral de Goiás and Petrolina de Goiás. Highway connections are made from Goiânia by taking GO-070 / Goianira / Inhumas / GO-426. Distancias Rodoviarias

Neighboring municipalities are Taquaral de Goiás, Jaraguá, Jesúpolis, Petrolina de Goiás, and Itauçu.

== Demographics ==
- Population density: 16.68 inhabitants/km^{2} (2007)
- Population growth rate 1996/2007: -2.37%
- Population in 2007: 2,851
- Population in 1980: 4,326
- Urban population in 2007: 2,111
- Rural population in 2007: 740

== Economy ==
The economy is based on subsistence agriculture, cattle raising, services, public administration, and small transformation industries. The economic sector consisted of 1 small industry and 23 retail units in 2007. There were no bank branches and there were 254 automobiles. The cattle herd had 21,000 head in 2006 while the main crops cultivated were pineapple, garlic, rice (180 ha.), bananas, beans, manioc, corn (350 ha.), tomatoes, and soybeans.

=== Agricultural data (2006) ===
- Number of Farms: 253
- Total area: 16,757 ha.
- Area of permanent crops: 12 ha.
- Area of perennial crops: 2,693 ha.
- Area of natural pasture: 9,808 ha.
- Area of woodland and forests: 4,106 ha.
- Persons dependent on farming: 725
- Farms with tractors: 30
- Number of tractors: 49

== Health and education ==
There were 2 schools in 2006 with 810 students. The adult literacy rate was 82.7% (2000) (the national average was 86.4%). There was one hospital with 16 beds. The infant mortality rate was 26.83 (2000) (the national average was 33).

Santa Rosa de Goiás scored 0.715 (2000) on the Municipal Human Development Index, giving it a state ranking of 187 (out of 242 municipalities) and a national ranking of 2,728 (out of 5,507 municipalities).

== See also ==
- List of municipalities in Goiás
- Microregions of Goiás
- Anápolis Microregion
