= Damolândia =

- Municipality
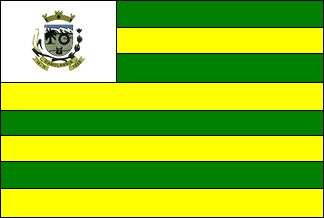
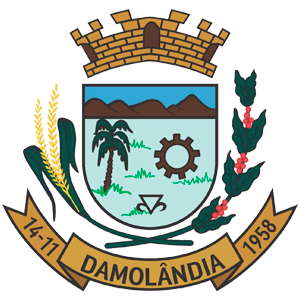
- Flag Coat of arms

- Location in Goiás state

- Location in Brazil
- Coordinates: 16°14′38″S 49°21′10″W
- Country: Brazil
- Region: Central-West
- State: Goiás
- Microregion: Anápolis Microregion

Area
  - Total: 84.9 km^{2} (32.8 sq mi)
- Elevation: 819 m (2,687 ft)

Population (2020)
  - Total: 2,953
  - Density: 34.8/km^{2} (90.1/sq mi)
- Time zone: UTC−3 (BRT)
- Postal code: 75420-000

Damolândia (Portuguese: [dɐmoˈlɐ̃dʒɐ]) is a municipality in central Goiás state, Brazil.

== Highway connections ==
The distance to Goiânia is 79 km. while the distance to Anápolis is 62 km. Highway connections from Goiânia: GO-462 / Santo Antônio de Goiás / GO-222 / Nova Veneza / GO-416. Neighboring municipalities: Petrolina de Goiás, Ouro Verde de Goiás, Nova Veneza, Brazabrantes, and Inhumas

== Demographics ==
- Population density: 31.76 inhabitants/km^{2} (2007)
- Population growth rate: 0.21% 1996/2007
- Population in 2007: 2,688 (2,366 in 1980)
- Urban population in 2007: 1,136 (1,292 in 1980)
- Rural population in 2007: 552 (1,074 in 1980)

== The economy ==
The main economic activities were livestock raising and agriculture. Although Damolândia is one of the smallest municipalities in the state of Goiás, it still has space for a substantial cattle herd of 13,100 cows (2006). The main agricultural products in planted area (2006) were bananas, rice, beans, corn, and coffee.

- Industrial establishments: 10
- Commercial retail establishments: 24
- Financial institutions: Banco Itaú S.A. (August/2007)
- Creamery: Cooperativa Agropecuária Regional do Rio das Almas Ltda. (22/05/2006)
- Motor vehicles: 366 automobiles and pickup trucks (2007)

Farm Data for 2006 in Hectares

- Number of farms: 176
- Total area: 2,372 ha
- Planted area: 310 ha.
- Area of natural pasture: 1,881 ha.
- Workers employed: 490

== Health and education ==
The literacy rate in 2000 was 84.9% while the infant mortality rate in 2000 was 20.59 in 1,000 live births. There were 03 schools (2006) with 715 students and 01 small hospital (2007) with 10 beds. On the Municipal Human Development Index Damolândia had a score of 0.739, which ranked it 111 (out of 242 municipalities in 2000) in the state and 2,176 (out of 5,507 municipalities in 2000) in the country. (All data are from 2000). For the complete list see frigoletto.com.br

== History ==
The history of Damolândia began in 1918 when Antônio Dâmaso da Sila and his family, from Patrocínio, Minas Gerais settled on the banks of the Ribeirão Capoeirão. There he set up a saw mill and began to divide the land that he had acquired from João Pires, hoping to start a new town. In 1925 the settlement was elevated to the category of district of Anápolis and in 1928 a road was opened connecting it to Anápolis and Inhumas. In 1958 it became a municipality on its own taking the name of Damolândia honoring its founder.

== See also ==
- List of municipalities in Goiás
- Microregions of Goiás
