= Jesúpolis =

- Municipality
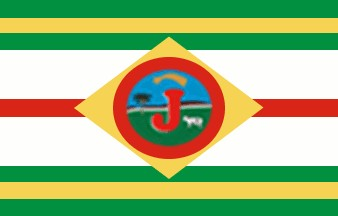
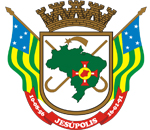
- Flag Coat of arms

- Location in Goiás state

- Location in Brazil
- Coordinates: 15°57′14″S 49°22′24″W
- Country: Brazil
- Region: Central-West
- State: Goiás
- Microregion: Anápolis Microregion

Area
  - Total: 120.9 km^{2} (46.7 sq mi)
- Elevation: 666 m (2,185 ft)

Population (2020)
  - Total: 2,506
  - Density: 20.73/km^{2} (53.68/sq mi)
- Time zone: UTC−3 (BRT)
- Postal code: 75495-000

Jesúpolis is a municipality in central Goiás state, Brazil. The name literally means "City of Jesus".

== Distances and location ==
- Distance to Anápolis: 150 km.
- Highway connections from Goiânia: GO-080 / Nerópolis / São Francisco de Goiás / GO-529. For all distances see Seplan

Neighboring municipalities: Jaraguá, São Francisco de Goiás, Petrolina de Goiás, and Santa Rosa de Goiás.

== Demographics ==
- Population density: 18.20 inhabitants/km^{2} (2007)
- Population growth rate 1996/2007: 0.48%
- Population in 2007: 2,201
- Urban population in 2007: 1,688
- Rural population in 2007: 513

== Economy ==
The economy is based on modest commerce, public employment, cattle raising, and agriculture. The cattle herd had 12,000 head in 2006 while the main agricultural products were rice, corn, manioc, and a modest production of bananas.

- Number of industrial establishments: 0 (2007)
- Number of retail establishments: 13
- Banking establishments: none
- Automobiles: 104 (2007)

Agricultural data 2006

- Number of Farms: 141
- Total area: 10,235 ha.
- Area of permanent crops: 10 (bananas)
- Area of perennial crops: 643 (rice, corn, manioc)
- Area of natural pasture: 7,622 ha.
- Area of woodland and forests: 1,545 ha.
- Persons dependent on farming: 256
- Farms with tractors: 18
- Number of tractors: 28
- Cattle herd: 12,000 head IBGE

== Education, health, and quality of life ==
There were 2 schools in activity with 645 students. The literacy rate was 82.6% in 2000. In the health sector there were no hospitals and 1 walk-in health clinic (2005). The infant mortality rate was 27.68 (in 1,000 live births)

Jesúpolis ranked 0.721 on the Municipal Human Development Index, placing it 170 (out of 242 municipalities in 2000)in the state and 2,606 (out of 5,507 municipalities in 2000) in the country. All data are from 2000. For the complete list see Frigoletto
