= Jaraguá, Goiás =

Jaraguá
- Municipality
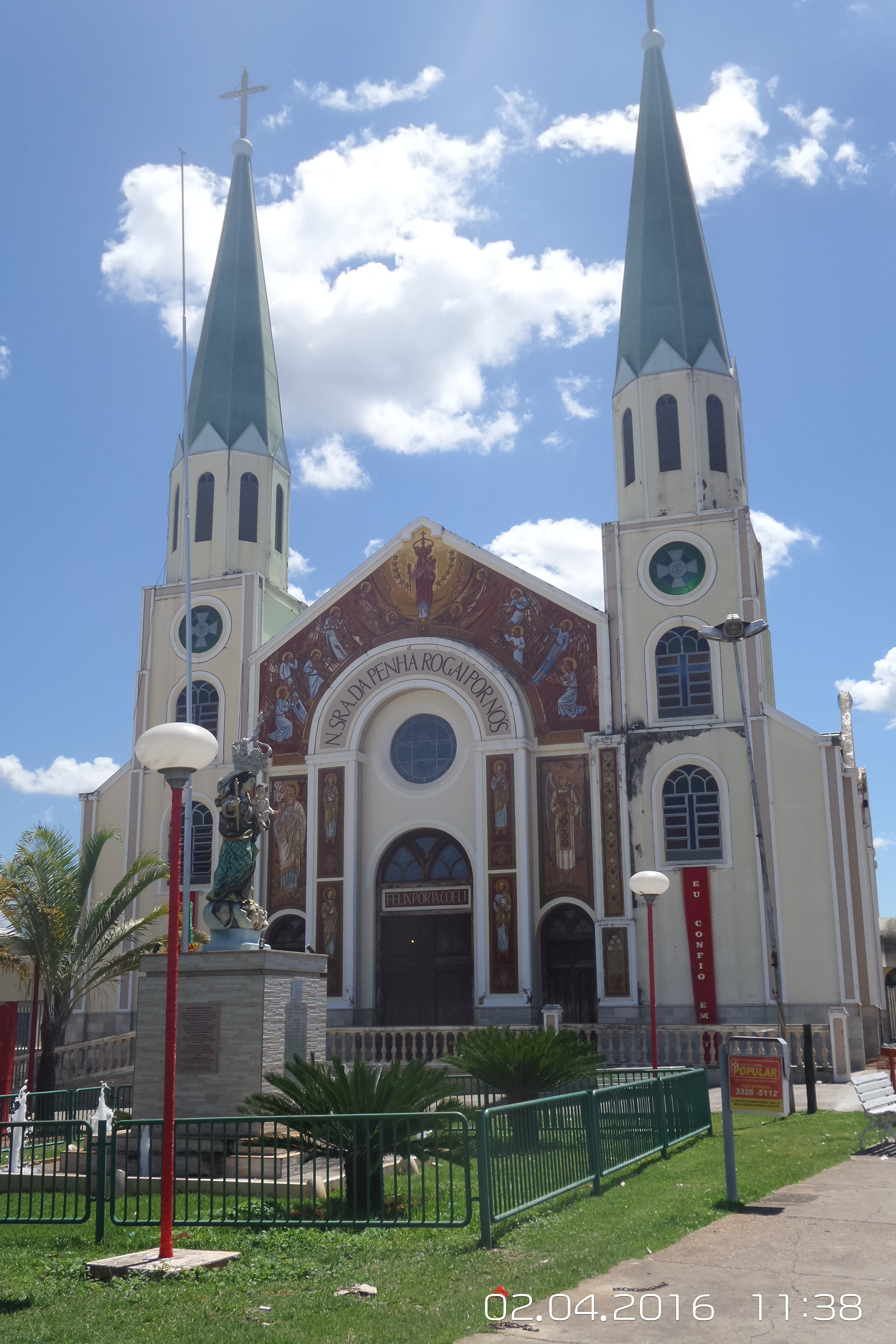

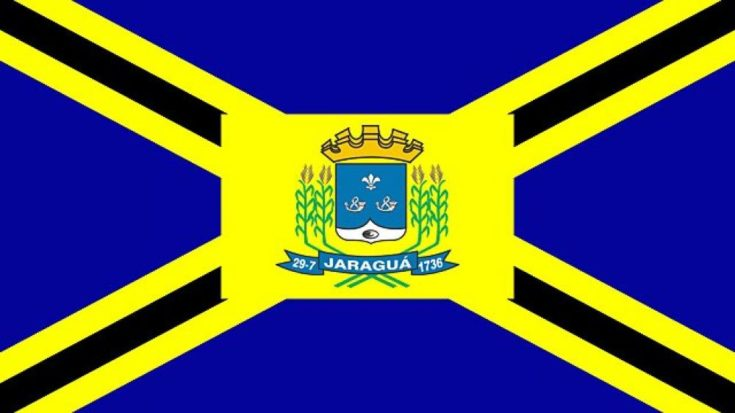
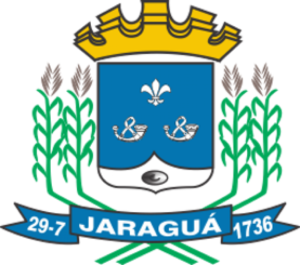
- Flag Coat of arms

- Location in Goiás state

- Location in Brazil
- Coordinates: 15°44′23″S 49°20′05″W
- Country: Brazil
- Region: Central-West
- State: Goiás
- Microregion: Anápolis Microregion

Area
  - Total: 1,888.9 km^{2} (729.3 sq mi)
- Elevation: 666 m (2,185 ft)

Population (2020)
  - Total: 51,338
  - Density: 27.179/km^{2} (70.393/sq mi)
- Time zone: UTC−3 (BRT)
- Postal code: 76330-000

Jaraguá is a municipality in central Goiás state, Brazil. It is a regional center and a producer of agricultural products, clothing, and cattle.

== Location and connections ==
Considered to be the national capital of the clothing industry, Jaraguá is in the Vale do São Patrício on the important Belém-Brasília highway (BR-153). It is 124 km from the state capital of Goiânia and 230 km from the federal capital of Brasília. Anápolis, the second largest city in the state of Goiás, lies 90 km to the south.

Highway connections from Goiânia are made by GO-080 / Nerópolis / São Francisco de Goiás / BR-153 /. For a complete list of distances and highway connections in the state of Goiás see Seplan

=== Municipal boundaries ===
Goianésia, Itaguari, Itaguaru, Jesúpolis, Pirenópolis, Rianápolis, Santa Isabel, Santa Rosa de Goiás, São Francisco de Goiás, Taquaral de Goiás and Uruana.

=== Demographics ===
- Population density: 20.63 inhabitants/km^{2} (2007)
- Population growth rate 1996/2007: 2.57%
- Population in 2007: 38,968
- Population in 1980: 36,559
- Urban population in 2007: 32,116
- Rural population in 2007: 6,852

== Economy ==
Today Jaraguá has a solid economy based on agriculture, cattle raising and the clothing industry. In agriculture Jaraguá produces pineapple, watermelon, corn, rice, and beans. In cattle raising it has one of the largest herds of cattle in the state (176,000 in 2007) and is a leader in milk and dairy product production with 32,000 milking cows. Jaraguá is the largest producer of pineapple in the state of Goiás, with most of the product being exported to São Paulo.

The clothing industry is responsible for the presence of over 400 small factories. Everything began in the 1970s with the arrival of the Pereira da Silva family, who were modest tailors. Today the clothes manufactured here are known all over the country with salespersons arriving to buy up stock and resell it in the large urban centers of the south.

- Number of industrial establishments: 442
- Number of retail establishments: 339
- Dairies: Conceição Fleury de Bastos., Fleury e Pinto Ltda. (22/05/2006)
- Banking establishments: Banco do Brasil S.A., BRADESCO S.A., Banco Itaú S.A., CEF, HSBC Bank Brasil S.A., Banco Multiplo.
- Automobiles: 3,856

Agricultural data 2006

- Number of Farms: 1,534
- Total area: 129,864 ha.
- Area of permanent crops: 1,302 ha. (pineapple, coconuts, citrus fruits)
- Area of perennial crops: 8,854 ha. (corn, beans, and rice)
- Area of natural pasture: 93,995 ha.
- Area of woodland and forests: 25,656 ha.
- Persons dependent on farming: 5,100
- Farms with tractors: 231
- Number of tractors: 293
- Cattle herd: 176,000 head IBGE

== Education (2006) ==
There were 33 schools in activity with 10,514 teachers. There was a campus of UEG - Faculdade Estadual de Ciências Humanas e Exatas de Jaraguá The literacy Rate was 86.6%.

== Health (2007) ==
- There were 2 hospitals with 94 beds and 11 walk-in clinics . The infant mortality rate was 24.81 (in 1,000 live births)

Municipal Human Development Index

- MHDI: 0.728
- State ranking: 154 (out of 242 municipalities in 2000)
- National ranking: 2,478 (out of 5,507 municipalities in 2000)

All data are from 2000

For the complete list see frigoletto.com.br

== History ==
The settlement of the region where Jaraguá is now located began in the first decades of the eighteenth century. The first settlers were prospectors looking for gold who established a settlement called Córrego de Jaraguá on the banks of the Rio Pari. Unhealthy conditions and flooding of the river convinced the inhabitants to move the town to higher ground where they built a church called Nossa Senhora da Penha on a wide and straight street called Rua Direita, after the tradition in Portugal. By 1748 the church was ready with five altars of gold and silver. In 1776 a second church was built called Nossa Senhora do Rosario, and in 1828 a third church called Nossa Senhora da Conceição was completed. In 1833 Jaraguá was made a "vila" with the name of Nossa Senhora da Penha de Jaraguá. In 1882 the vila was dismembered from Pirenópolis to become a municipality. In the 1960s the government finished the BR-153 highway, or Belem-Brasília, which led to rapid development of the region. See Jaraguá for the history in Portuguese.

== See also ==
- List of municipalities in Goiás
