= Caturaí =

- Municipality
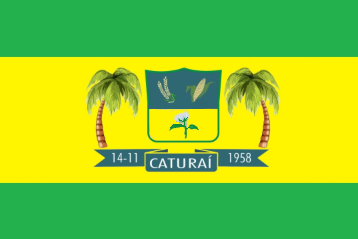
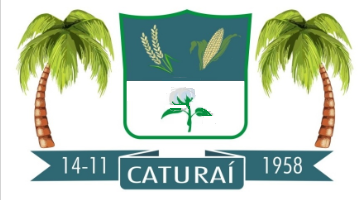
- Flag Coat of arms

- Location in Goiás state

- Location in Brazil
- Coordinates: 16°26′48″S 49°29′21″W
- Country: Brazil
- Region: Central-West
- State: Goiás
- Microregion: Anápolis Microregion

Area
  - Total: 206.0 km^{2} (79.5 sq mi)
- Elevation: 763 m (2,503 ft)

Population (2020)
  - Total: 5,101
  - Density: 24.76/km^{2} (64.13/sq mi)
- Time zone: UTC−3 (BRT)
- Postal code: 75430-000

Caturaí is a municipality in central Goiás state, Brazil.

Caturaí is 32 kilometers north of Goiânia and belongs to the Anápolis Microregion. It is connected to the state capital by highway GO-070. Neighboring municipalities are: Inhumas, Goiânia, Santa Bárbara de Goiás, Araçu, Avelinópolis, and Trindade.

== Geography ==
The climate is tropical with minimum temperatures of 17 °C and maximums of 27 °C. The terrain is flat and is bathed by the Rio Peixe, which has its source in the municipality of Inhumas, and the Rio Anicuns, which forms the boundary with Avelinópolis. The vegetation, characterised by cerrado is rich in forest and fertile lands.

== Demographics ==
- Population density: 21.61 inhabitants/km^{2} (2007)
- Population growth rate: 0.79% 1996/2007
- Population in 2007: 4,477 (3,899 in 1980)
- Urban population in 2007: 3,341 (1,553 in 1980)
- Rural population in 2007: 1,136 (2,346 in 1980)

== Economy ==
The main economic activity is cattle raising, but there are also plantations of beans, soybeans, corn, and peanuts.

- Industrial establishments: 12 (June 2007)
- Retail commerce establishments: 22 (August 2007)
- Banking establishments: none (August 2007)

Agricultural data 2006

- Farms: 325
- Total area: 14,359 ha.
- Area of permanent crops: 217 ha.
- Area of perennial crops: 1,848 ha.
- Area of natural pasture: 10,147 ha.
- Area of woodland and forests: 1,863 ha.
- Persons dependent on farming: 1,060
- Farms with tractors: 58
- Number of tractors: 75
- Cattle herd: 22,500 head IBGE

== Health and education ==
The infant mortality rate in 2000 was 21.15. There were 03 public health clinics (SUS) in 2003. The literacy rate in 2000 was 83.2. There were 03 primary schools in 2006, with 23 classrooms, 48 teachers, and 1,482 students. Caturaí had a score of 0.728 on the Municipal Human Development Index, ranking it 152 (out of 242 municipalities) in the state and 2,471 (out of 5,507 municipalities) in the country.

== History ==
The town of Caturaí was founded in 1940 by members of the Spiritualist religion near the river called Rio do Peixe in the municipality of Inhumas. A church, Centro Espírita Santo Antônia de Pádua, was built and it soon attracted more settlers who came seeking miraculous cures. The first name of the town was Santo Antônio de Pádua. Soon there were around 600 inhabitants. In 1958 it was elevated to municipal status.

== See also ==
- List of municipalities in Goiás
