= Ouro Verde de Goiás =

- Municipality
- Flag

- Location in Goiás state

- Location in Brazil
- Coordinates: 16°13′10″S 49°11′42″W
- Country: Brazil
- Region: Central-West
- State: Goiás
- Microregion: Anápolis Microregion

Area
  - Total: 209.6 km^{2} (80.9 sq mi)
- Elevation: 806 m (2,644 ft)

Population (2020)
  - Total: 3,723
  - Density: 17.76/km^{2} (46.00/sq mi)
- Time zone: UTC−3 (BRT)
- Postal code: 75165-000

Ouro Verde de Goiás (Portuguese: [ˈowɾu ˈveʁdʒi dʒi ɡoˈjas]) is a municipality in central Goiás state, Brazil.

== Location ==
Ouro Verde is 63 km. northeast of Goiânia and 31 km west of Anápolis.

- Highway connections: state highway GO-080 north from Goiânia to Nerópolis and then GO-433 for 22 km. north. Distancias Rodoviarias

Neighboring municipalities: Nova Veneza, Anápolis, Damolândia, and Petrolina de Goiás

== Demographics ==
- Population density: 21.13 inhabitants/km^{2} (2007)
- Population in 2007: 4,430 (3,844 in 1980)
- Urban population in 2007: 2,838 (1,686 in 1980)
- Rural population in 2007: 1,592 (2,158 in 1980)

== The economy ==
The economy is based on agriculture, cattle raising, services, and public administration. In 2007 there were 10 industrial units and 24 commercial units in the city. There were no banking institutions. In 2007, there were 471 automobiles.

In 2006, there were 28,340 head of cattle. The main agricultural products were rice, bananas (200 ha.), coffee, sugarcane, beans, oranges, lemons, manioc, corn (1,000 ha.), soybeans, and tomatoes. Production was very modest due to the limited area of the municipality.

Farm data in 2006

- Number of farms: 516
- Total area: 18,763
- Planted area: 2,200 ha.
- Area of natural pasture: 13,862
- Workers employed in agriculture: 1,900

== Health and education ==
In 2003, there was 1 hospital with 22 beds and 2 ambulatory health clinics. There were 6 doctors, 1 nurse, and 2 dentists in 2002. In 2000, the infant mortality rate was 30.58, below the national average of 33.0.

In 2006, the school system had 3 schools, 27 classrooms, 54 teachers, and 1,227 students. Included were 196 middle/secondary school students in 1 school. IN 2000 the adult literacy rate was 85.9%, below the national average of 86.4%.

Ouro Verde de Goiás had a ranking on the Municipal Human Development Index of 0.719, placing it 176 (out of 242 municipalities) in the state and 2,635 (out of 5,507 municipalities) in the country. All data are from 2000. For the complete list see Frigoletto.com.br

== See also ==
- List of municipalities in Goiás
- Microregions of Goiás
