= TH+ Record Campinas =

Television station in Campinas, Brazil

TH+ Record Campinas (ZYB 865)
Campinas, São Paulo; Brazil
- Channels: Digital: 28 (UHF); Virtual: 6

Programming
- Affiliations: Record

Ownership
- Owner: Grupo Thathi de Comunicação; (Televisão Princesa d'Oeste de Campinas Ltda.)

History
- First air date: February 1, 1985
- Former names: TV Princesa d'Oeste (1985-1986); TV Metrópole (1986-1990); TV Diário do Povo (1990-1994); TV Brasil Campinas (1994-2007); TVB Campinas (2007-2020); TV Thathi Campinas (2020-2025)
- Former channel numbers: Analog: 6 (VHF, 1985-2018)
- Former affiliations: TV Record (1985-1986); Rede Manchete (1986-1990); SBT (1990-2011)

Technical information
- Licensing authority: ANATEL
- ERP: 1.7 kW
- Transmitter coordinates: 22°56′34.4″S 47°1′54″W

Links
- Public license information: Profile
- Website: thmais.com.br/campinas/

TH+ Record Campinas (channel 6) is a Brazilian television station located in Campinas, São Paulo, Brazil serving as the Record affiliate for central-eastern São Paulo. Owned and operated by Ribeirão Preto-based Grupo Thathi de Comunicação, the station's studios are located at the Jardim Leonor neighborhood with its transmitter located at Jardim São Gabriel.

== History ==
TV Princesa d'Oeste was born out of a license granted on October 5, 1982 by the then-President of the Republic João Figueiredo. Its launch, however, was on the night of February 1, 1985, as announced by O Estado de S. Paulo. The first live broadcast was carried out from the field headquarters of the Clube Semanal de Cultura Artística under the command of journalist Blota Jr., one of the station's owners at the time. In addition to him, Natal Gale, owner of Rádio Jequitibá (today Jovem Pan News Campinas), and Raphael Pereira da Silva were also owners: at the time, Paulo Machado de Carvalho, co-owner of TV Record, was also one of the shareholders.

At the end of 2010, TVB opted not to renew its contract with SBT which was ending. After disaffiliating with Silvio Santos' network, on December 5, 2010, TVB signed an affiliation contract with Rede Record to begin broadcasting its programming from 00:15 on February 1, 2011. It maintains local programming and expands its journalistic programming to two hours a day with Balanço Geral, presented by Jair Duprá and the SP Record, with Carolina Cerqueira.

In October 2020, Grupo Solpanamby sold TVB Campinas and its other media assets to Grupo Thathi de Comunicação, based in Ribeirão Preto. After the purchase, on November 4, the station was renamed TV Thathi Campinas, the same name as the station that the group maintained in Campinas and the region during the 1990s, currently Rede Família.

On February 10, 2025, the station, as well as its sisters spread across the state of São Paulo, started using the TH+ brand, with the Campinas station adopting the name TH+ Record Campinas. The new nomenclature, according to the Thathi Group, reinforces the connection between open television stations, in addition to radio stations and the corporate portal of the Thathi Communication Group.

== Technical information ==
=== Subchannels ===
Channel	Video	Aspect	Short name	Programming
6.1	1080i	16:9	TH+ Record	Main TH+ Record Campinas programming / Record

As TVB Campinas, it officially started its digital broadcasts on May 24, 2010, on virtual channel 28. That day, there was a special participation of journalist Hermano Henning as the presenter of TVB Notícias 1.ª Edição.

The station shut down its analog signal on VHF channel 6 on January 17, 2018, following the official ANATEL roadmap, during Dancing Brasil.
