= Grupo Thathi de Comunicação =

Grupo Thathi de Comunicação (Thathi Communication Group) is a Brazilian media conglomerate headquartered in Ribeirão Preto, São Paulo.

== History ==
It was founded in 1991 by the Lebanese naturalized Brazilian businessman Chaim Zaher and received its current name in 1993, in honor to Thalita, Thamila, Thiciana and Thiara, Zaher's daughters.

In 2020, the group acquired TVB Campinas (affiliated with Record), TVB Litoral (affiliated with Band), the radio network Novabrasil FM and other communication companies of the Grupo Solpanamby, of the Quércia family.

On October 22, 2024, Grupo Thathi acquired the 60% of the shares of SBT Interior, affiliated with SBT, in Araçatuba, São Paulo, who until then were belonging to Grupo Destro, of the businessman João Destro. On November 24, 2025, the group firmed an society agree for the benefit of SBT Central, from Jaú, and SBT RP, from Ribeirão Preto, both in the inland of the state of São Paulo. The stations stopped to be operated and passed to be affiliated with SBT.

On August 1 of the same year, Grupo Thathi arrived to the Northeast region of Brazil, with the acquisitions of TV Tambaú and of the radio Clube FM João Pessoa, both from João Pessoa, Paraíba, belonging to Grupo Marquise, headquartered in Fortaleza, Ceará.

== Actives ==
=== Television ===
- TH+ TV
- TH+ Band Litoral
- TH+ Record Campinas
- TH+ SBT Interior
- TH+ SBT Tambaú
- TH+ SBT Vale
- SBT Central
- SBT RP

=== Radio ===
- Novabrasil
  - Novabrasil São Paulo
  - Novabrasil Brasília
  - Novabrasil Salvador
  - Novabrasil Campinas
  - Novabrasil João Pessoa
- Nova Paradiso FM
- Rádio Central
- Difusora FM

=== Internet ===
- TH+ Portal

=== Former actives ===
- TV Thathi Limeira
