= Heitoraí =

- Municipality
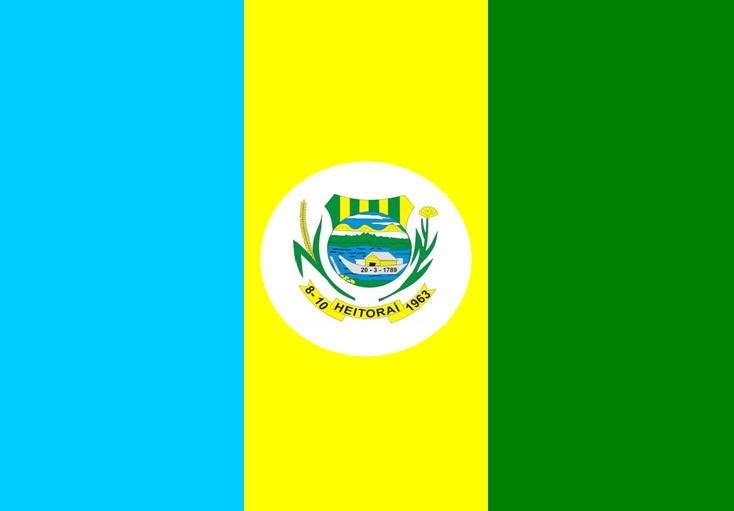
- Flag

- Location in Goiás state

- Location in Brazil
- Coordinates: 15°43′22″S 49°49′36″W
- Country: Brazil
- Region: Central-West
- State: Goiás
- Microregion: Anápolis Microregion

Area
  - Total: 229.6 km^{2} (88.6 sq mi)
- Elevation: 658 m (2,159 ft)

Population (2020)
  - Total: 3,733
  - Density: 16.26/km^{2} (42.11/sq mi)
- Time zone: UTC−3 (BRT)
- Postal code: 76670-000

Heitoraí is a municipality in central Goiás state, Brazil.

== Location ==
Heitoraí lies 142 km. from the regional center of Anápolis. Highway connections are made by federal highway BR-153 from Goiânia to Itaberaí then north on GO-156 for 38 kilometers.

Neighboring municipalities are Guaraíta, Itapuranga, Itaguaru and Itaberaí

== Demographics ==
- Population density: 15.48 inhabitants/km^{2} (2007)
- Population growth rate: 1.67% 1996/2007
- Population in 2007: 3,556 (3,283 in 1980)
- Urban population in 2007: 2,468 (1,088 in 1980)
- Rural population in 2007: 1,088 (1,450 in 1980)

== The economy ==
The main economic activities are cattle raising with 23,890 head (2005) and agriculture. The main crops cultivated are rice, beans, sugarcane, manioc, corn, and banana. In 2006 there were 376 farms with an area of 12,856 ha. of which 9,000 ha. were natural pasture. Approximately 1,000 workers were in the agricultural sector.

- Number of industrial establishments: 5
- Number of retail establishments: 29
- Number of motor vehicles: 249 automobiles and 43 pickup trucks
- Number of banking establishments: none

== Health and education ==
The literacy rate was 85.8% in 2000 while the infant mortality rate was 21.53 in 1,000 live births. There were 06 schools in 2006, with 1,129 students. Health care was provided by 1 hospital with 19 beds (2007).

Heitoraí ranked 0.744 on the Municipal Human Development Index, giving it a state ranking of 93 (out of 242 municipalities) and a national ranking of 2,055 (out of 5,507 municipalities). (2000) For the complete list see frigoletto.com.br

== See also ==
- List of municipalities in Goiás
- Anápolis Microregion
- Microregions of Goiás
