= Microregion of Anápolis =

Coordinates: 16°19′37″S 48°57′10″W

Anápolis
- Microregion
- Location in Goias state
- Country: Brazil
- State: Goiás
- Mesoregion: Centro Goiano
- Municipalities: 20

Area
  - Total: 8,386.80 km^{2} (3,238.16 sq mi)

Population (2007)
  - Total: 517,221
  - Density: 62/km^{2} (160/sq mi)

The Anápolis Microregion is a microregion of central Goiás state, Brazil. More than sixty percent of the population is concentrated in Anápolis, the regional center.

The land is fertile and well-watered. The towns are small and comparatively prosperous. The largest cities are Anápolis, Inhumas, Jaraguá, and Itaberaí. The most populous municipality is Anápolis with 325,544 inhabitants. The least populous is Jesúpolis with 2,201 inhabitants.

The largest municipality in land area is Jaraguá with 1,895.6 km^{2}. The smallest is Damolândia with 84.9 km^{2}.

The area is slightly smaller than Puerto Rico or slightly less than three times the size of the American state of Rhode Island.

== Municipalities in the Anápolis Microregion ==
The microregion consists of the following municipalities:

Name	Population (2007)
Anápolis	325,544
Araçu	3,880
Brazabrantes	3,142
Campo Limpo de Goiás	5,596
Caturaí	4,477
Damolândia	2,688
Heitoraí	3,556
Inhumas	44,983
Itaberaí	30,609
Itaguari	4,254
Itaguaru	5,467
Itauçu	8,710
Jaraguá	38,968
Jesúpolis	2,201
Nova Veneza	6,884
Ouro Verde de Goiás	4,430
Petrolina de Goiás	9,864
Santa Rosa de Goiás	2,851
São Francisco de Goiás	5,713
Taquaral de Goiás	3,404

== See also ==
- Microregions in Goiás
