= Itaberaí =

- Municipality
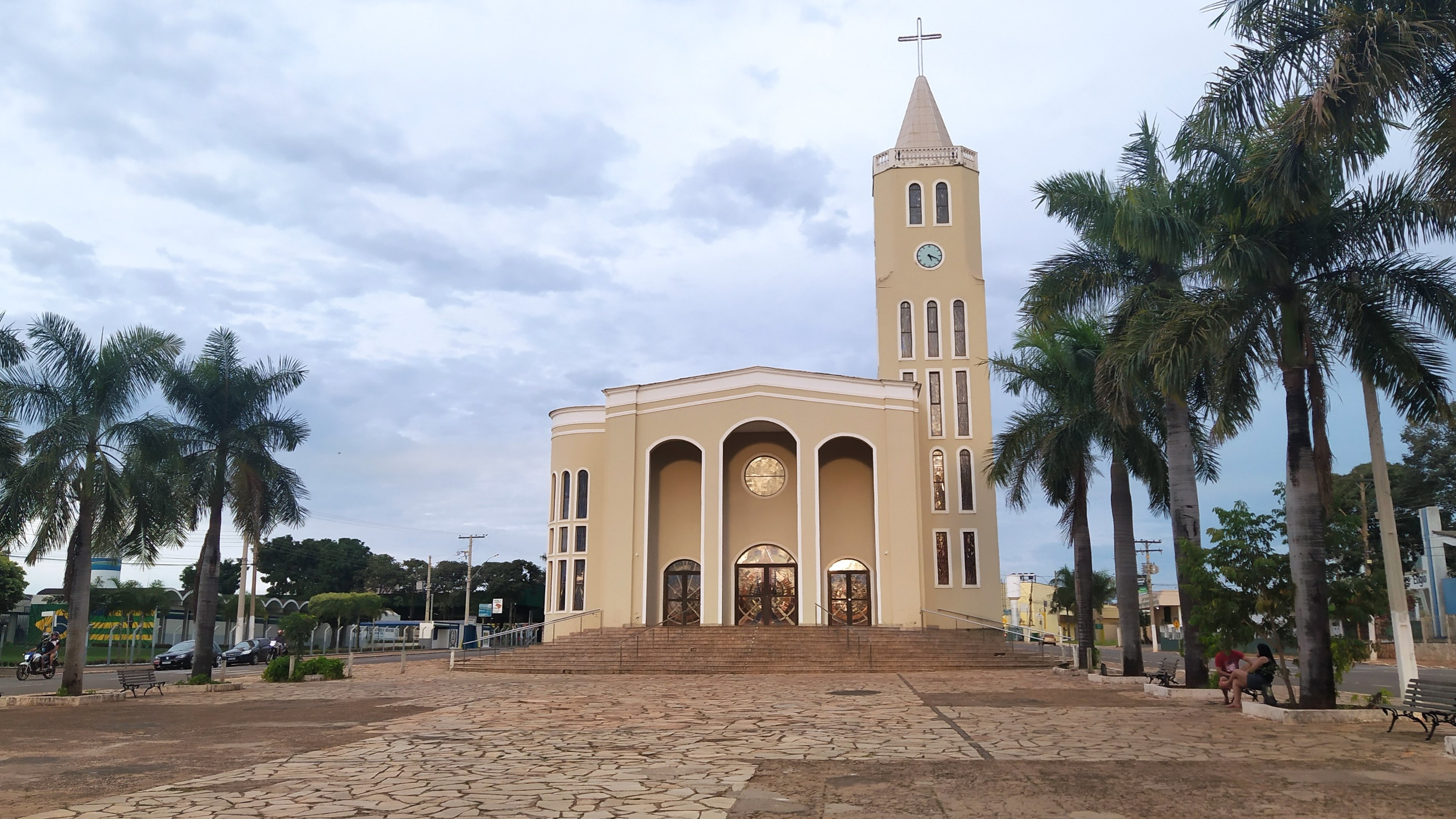

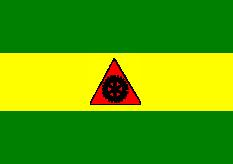
- Flag

- Location in Goiás state

- Location in Brazil
- Coordinates: 16°00′30″S 49°47′46″W
- Country: Brazil
- Region: Central-West
- State: Goiás
- Microregion: Anápolis Microregion

Area
  - Total: 1,471.1 km^{2} (568.0 sq mi)
- Elevation: 701 m (2,300 ft)

Population (2020)
  - Total: 43,622
  - Density: 29.653/km^{2} (76.800/sq mi)
- Time zone: UTC−3 (BRT)
- Postal code: 76630-000
- Website: www.maisitaberai.com.br

Itaberaí is a municipality in central Goiás state, Brazil. Itaberaí is a large producer of agricultural products including corn, rice, soybeans, tomatoes, and sugarcane.

== Location ==
Itaberaí is located 92 kilometers north-west of Goiânia on state highway GO-070 and 36 kilometers southeast of the former capital, Cidade de Goiás. Itaberaí is part of the Anápolis Microregion.

- Neighboring municipalities: Americano do Brasil, Anicuns, Araçu, Avelinópolis, Cidade de Goiás, Heitoraí, Itaguari, Itaguaru, Itauçu, Mossâmedes, Taquaral de Goiás and Uruana.
- Districts (distritos), villages (povoados), and hamlets (aglomerados): – Povoados: Congomé, Santa Rita and Santo Antônio. – Aglomerados: Lobeira, São Benedito and São José do Retiro.

== Climate ==
The climate is humid tropical with regular rains in the summer. The most important rivers are Rio das Pedras, Rio Uru, which has its source in the Serra Dourada and forms a boundary with the municipality of Goiás.

== Demographic data ==
- Population growth rate 1991/2000: 1.29.%
- Population in 1980: 25,822 (Urban: 11,779; Rural: 14,043)
- Population in 1991: 24,852
- Urban population in 2003: 29,775
- Rural population in 2003: 6,858

== The economy ==
Itaberaí is privileged to have fertile soil, ideal for the growing of sugarcane (4,912 hectares in 2006), corn (10,000 hectares in 2006) soybeans (9,000 hectares in 2006), rice and beans, besides the large number of dairy and beef cattle (125,000 head). The strongest part of the local economy is a chicken processing industry called Super Frango, which is one of the largest in the state. Super Frango is one of the largest poultry companies in the country of Brasil. The company employees many local residents. It annual sell volume it is estimated to be between 10 and 50 million dollars. There is also a feed factory and a storage facility for soybeans and corn. See Sepin for complete data.

== Education (2006) ==
There were 24 schools in activity in 2005 with 354 teachers.

- Higher education: UEG – Faculdade Estadual de Ciências Agrárias, Humanas e Letras de Itaberaí – Faculdade Est. Rio da Pedras
- Literacy Rate: 84.2%

== Health (2007) ==
There were 3 hospitals with 121 beds, 6 walk-in clinics, 24 doctors, 4 nurses, and 5 dentists. The infant mortality rate was 25.11 (in 1,000 live births).

Human Development Index

- MHDI: 0.739
- State ranking: 106 (out of 242 municipalities in 2000)
- National ranking: 2,161 (out of 5,507 municipalities in 2000)

All data are from 2000

For the complete list see frigoletto.com.br

== History ==
The city has its origins in the seventeenth century when gold seekers arrived in the region. By 1855 there were 52 houses and two streets. With the name Curralinho it became a vila in 1868 and finally a municipality in 1924 with the name Itaberaí, which means River of Bright Rocks in Tupi-Guarani. Fundador: Salvador Pedroso de Campos

== See also ==
- List of municipalities in Goiás
