= Araçu =

- Municipality
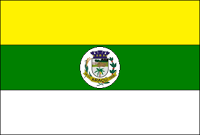
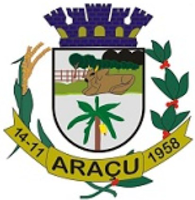
- Flag Coat of arms

- Location in Goiás state

- Location in Brazil
- Coordinates: 16°21′23″S 49°41′16″W
- Country: Brazil
- Region: Central-West
- State: Goiás
- Microregion: Anápolis Microregion

Area
  - Total: 154.02 km^{2} (59.47 sq mi)
- Elevation: 716 m (2,349 ft)

Population (2020)
  - Total: 3,486
  - Density: 22.63/km^{2} (58.62/sq mi)
- Time zone: UTC−3 (BRT)
- Postal code: 75410-000

Araçu is a municipality in central Goiás state, Brazil.

== Geography ==
Araçu is part of the Anápolis Microregion and is a short distance northwest of the state capital, Goiânia. It has boundaries with Itaberaí, Itauçu, and Caturaí. The distance to the state capital, Goiânia, is 75 km (47 mi) and highway connections are made by GO-070 / Goianira / GO-523 / Caturaí / GO-222.

== Demographics ==
The population density was 25.26 inhabitants/km^{2} (2007) with 3,343 people living in the urban areas and 537 living in the rural areas. The population growth rate was 0.49% for the period 1996/2007)

== Economy ==
The economy is based on cattle raising (19,500 head in 2006), services, public administration, and agriculture. The main agricultural products in 2006 were bananas, coffee, garlic, rice, sugarcane, beans, corn, and tomatoes. There were no financial institutions reported in 2007.

- Industrial establishments: 6
- Retail commerce establishments: 26
- Automobiles: 314

Agricultural data 2006

- Farms: 171
- Total area: 18,379 ha (45,420 acres)
- Area of permanent crops: 426 ha (1,050 acres)
- Area of perennial crops: 1,311 ha (3,240 acres)
- Area of natural pasture: 13,330 ha (32,900 acres)
- Area of woodland and forests: 2,735 ha (6,760 acres)
- Persons dependent on farming: 620
- Farms with tractors: 33
- Number of tractors: 47
- Cattle herd: 19,500 head IBGE

== Health and education ==
There was one small hospital with 16 beds in 2006. The infant mortality rate was 17.97 in 2000. In the educational sector there were 1,093 students attending primary and middle schools. The literacy rate was 81.5% in 2000. (IBGE 2004). The classification on the Human Development Index was 0.733. This ranked 130 (out of 242 municipalities) in the state and 2,337 out of 5,507 municipalities in the country.

== History ==
Araçu began on the ranch owned by José Jacinto da Silva, where there was a cemetery built in 1911. In 1912 Silva donated part of his land for the building of a chapel. From 1925 to 1930 with the arrival of the families of Antônio Camargo and João Faria, the settlement known as São Sebastião do Salobro, began to grow. In 1935 it belonged to the municipality of Itauçu and in 1941 it became a district with the name Araçu, a Tupi term that means "Terra Grande" (Large Land). In 1958 it was dismembered from Itauçu and became a municipality. Source: Sepin

== See also ==
- List of municipalities in Goiás
