= Taquaral de Goiás =

- Municipality
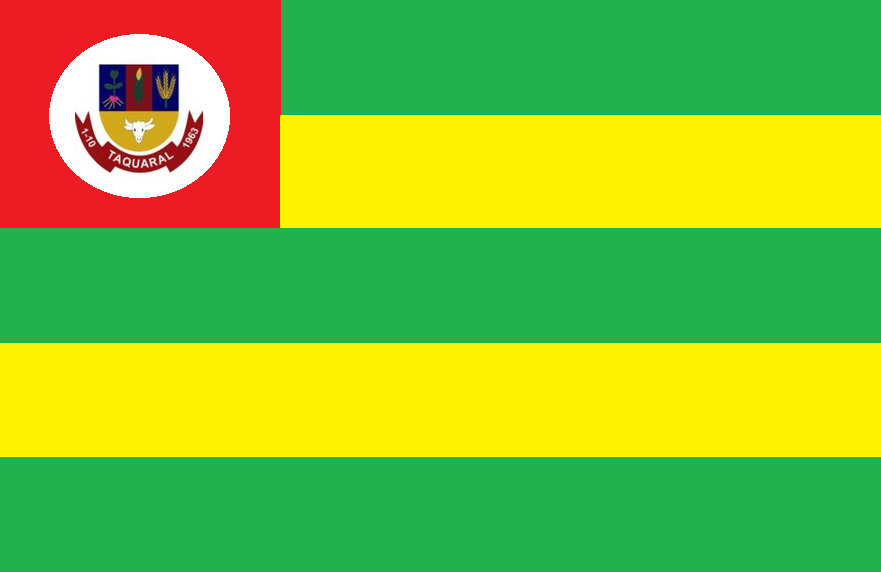
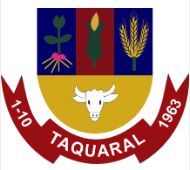
- Flag Coat of arms

- Location in Goiás state

- Location in Brazil
- Coordinates: 16°02′45″S 49°34′17″W
- Country: Brazil
- Region: Central-West
- State: Goiás
- Microregion: Anápolis Microregion

Area
  - Total: 201.3 km^{2} (77.7 sq mi)
- Elevation: 769 m (2,523 ft)

Population (2020)
  - Total: 3,521
  - Density: 17.49/km^{2} (45.30/sq mi)
- Time zone: UTC−3 (BRT)
- Postal code: 76640-000

Taquaral de Goiás (Portuguese: [takwaˈɾaw dʒi ɡoˈjas]) is a municipality in central Goiás state, Brazil.

== Location ==
Taquaral is located approximately 100 km northwest of regional center, Anápolis. It is 22 km west of Santa Rosa de Goiás and 25 km east of Itaberaí. Highway connections from Goiânia are made by state highway GO-070 from Goiânia north to Goianira, past Inhumas, and Itauçu and then GO-154 for 16 kilometers. Taquaral has become one of the most important clusters of lingerie in the State of Goiás. Every year thousands of people flock to the city to buy its production of fine lingerie in order to sell it within Goiás, in other states, and even abroad. See Sepin for all the state connections.

Neighboring municipalities are Itaberaí, Itaguari, Santa Rosa de Goiás, and Itauçu

== Demographics ==
- Population density: 16.90 inhabitants/km^{2} (2007)
- Total population in 2007: 3,404
- Total population in 1980: 9,154
- Population growth rate: -0.37% for 1996/2007
- Urban population: 2,698
- Rural population: 706 (4,431 in 1980)

== The economy ==
The economy is based on subsistence agriculture, cattle raising, services, public administration, and small transformation industries. Formerly there were nickel and manganese mines in the area but these have run out. There are several small clothing industries in the town. In the economic sector there were 33 industrial units in 2007 and 29 retail commerce units. There were 288 automobiles registered in 2007.

The cattle herd had 25,700 head (5,700 milk cows) in 2006, while the main crops cultivated were pineapple, rice, bananas, coffee, beans, manioc, corn, tomatoes, and soybeans.

Agricultural data 2006

- Number of Farms: 357
- Total area: 16,481 ha
- Area of permanent crops: 273 ha.
- Area of perennial crops: 807 ha.
- Area of natural pasture: 11,156 ha
- Area of woodland and forests: 3,117 ha.
- Persons dependent on farming: 800
- Farms with tractors: 20
- Number of tractors: 25 IBGE

== Health and education ==
In 2006 there were 2 schools with 968 students. The adult literacy rate was 84.6% (2000) (national average was 86.4%). In the health sector there were 2 small hospitals with 41 beds (2007). The infant mortality rate was 28.84 (2000) (national average was 33).

On the Municipal Human Development Index Taquaral de Goiás scored 0.726 (2000) giving it a state ranking of 158 (out of 242 municipalities) and a national ranking of 2,506 (out of 5,507 municipalities). For the complete list see frigoletto.com.br

== See also ==
- List of municipalities in Goiás
- Microregions of Goiás
