= Canal FDR =

Television station in Fortaleza, Brazil

Canal FDR, former TV O Povo (TV OP for short and TV People from Portuguese) is a television station in Fortaleza, Brazil. Station is a TV Cultura affiliate. The name O Povo refers a newspaper with the same name, owned by Grupo O Povo, owner of both.

== History ==
TV O Povo went on air in July 2007, only rebroadcasting TV Cultura programming from São Paulo. Now, TV O Povo has local programs.

Within the TV model of public interest, non-state, the station works with cultural support. Merchandising is not part of the proposed editorial of TV O Povo.

With TV O Povo launch, TV Ceará (formerly TV Cultura affiliate) began broadcasting TV Brasil, public station of Brazilian Federal Government.

Besides being tuned by the free channel 48 UHF, TV O Povo is tuned by the cable channel 11 on TV Show and channel 21 on the NET Fortaleza.
