= Nova Veneza, Goiás =

Municipality in Goiás, Brazil

Nova Veneza
- Municipality
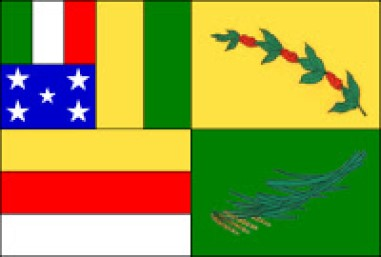
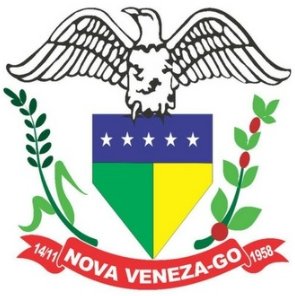
- Flag Coat of arms

- Location in Goiás state

- Location in Brazil
- Coordinates: 16°16′23″S 49°19′26″W
- Country: Brazil
- Region: Central-West
- State: Goiás
- Microregion: Anápolis Microregion

Area
  - Total: 123.3 km^{2} (47.6 sq mi)
- Elevation: 806 m (2,644 ft)

Population (2020)
  - Total: 10,018
  - Density: 81.25/km^{2} (210.4/sq mi)
- Time zone: UTC−3 (BRT)
- Postal code: 75470-000

Nova Veneza is a municipality in central Goiás state, Brazil.

== Location ==
Nova Veneza is located between Goiânia and Anápolis.

- Distance to Goiânia: 33 km.
- Distance to Anápolis: 49 km.
- Highway connections: GO-462 / Santo Antônio de Goiás.

Neighboring municipalities: Damolândia, Ouro Verde de Goiás, Brazabrantes, and Goiânia

== Demographic Information ==
In 2007 the population density was 55.80 inhabitants/km^{2}. In 2007 there were 5,875 inhabitants in the urban area and 1,009 in the rural area. The population has increased by about 2,100 since 1980.

== Economic Information ==
The main economic activities were agriculture, livestock raising, services, and government employment. The main crops were rice, sugarcane, corn, tomatoes, and citrus fruits. There was a fairly substantial poultry industry with more than 600,000 birds in 2006.

- Number of industrial establishments: 21
- Number of retail establishments: 57
- Banking establishments: Banco Itaú S.A.
- Automobiles: 597

=== Agricultural data 2006 ===
- Number of Farms: 244
- Total area: 7,362 ha.
- Area of permanent crops: 167 ha. (citrus fruits)
- Area of perennial crops: 796 ha. (corn, sugarcane, beans, and rice)
- Area of natural pasture: 7,635 ha.
- Area of woodland and forests: 1,039 ha.
- Persons dependent on farming: 480
- Farms with tractors: 21
- Number of tractors: 28
- Cattle herd: 16,900 head IBGE

== Health and Education ==
In 2007 there was 1 hospital with 18 beds and 4 walk-in health clinics. In 2000 the infant mortality rate was 25.56, well below the national average of 33.0.

In 2006 the school system had 6 schools, 47 classrooms, 81 teachers, and 1,942 students. There was 1 middle/secondary school with 375 students. In 2000 the literacy rate was 86.5%, slightly above the national average of 86.4%.

=== Income Distribution ===
Out of 1,811 households in 2000, 919 declared less than 1 minimum salary of income.

Nova Veneza scored 0.731 on the Municipal Human Development Index, placing it 141 (out of 242 municipalities) in the state. All data are from 2000. For the complete list see frigoletto.com.br

== See also ==
- List of municipalities in Goiás
