= Itauçu =

- Municipality
- Flag

- Location in Goiás state

- Location in Brazil
- Coordinates: 16°12′14″S 49°36′09″W
- Country: Brazil
- Region: Central-West
- State: Goiás
- Microregion: Anápolis Microregion

Area
  - Total: 383.7 km^{2} (148.1 sq mi)
- Elevation: 839 m (2,753 ft)

Population (2020)
  - Total: 8,960
  - Density: 23.4/km^{2} (60.5/sq mi)
- Time zone: UTC−3 (BRT)
- Postal code: 75450-000

Itauçu (Portuguese: [itauˈsu]) is a municipality in central Goiás state, Brazil.

== Location ==
Itauçu is located 64 km. northwest of the state capital, Goiânia and is part of the Anápolis Microregion. It is connected to the capital by highway BR-070, which links Goiânia with Aragarças. It has boundaries with the following municipalities:

- north: Taquaral de Goiás and Santa Rosa de Goiás
- west: Itaberaí
- east: Petrolina de Goiás
- south: Araçu and Inhumas

== Demographics ==
- Population growth rate 1991/2000: 0.24%
- Population in 2007: 8,710
- Population in 1980: 9,770
- Urban population in 2007: 6,404
- Rural population in 2007: 2,306

== The economy ==
The economy is based on cattle raising (49,000 head in 2004) and cultivation of soybeans, rice, corn, sugarcane, and beans.

- Number of industrial establishments: 24
- Number of retail establishments: 71
- Banking establishments: Banco Itaú S.A.
- Dairies: Laticínios Alvorada Ind. Com. Ltda. (22/05/2006)
- Automobiles: 757

Agricultural data 2006

- Farms: 446
- Total area: 41,650 ha.
- Area of permanent crops: 21,088 ha. (bananas, sugarcane, citrus fruits)
- Area of perennial crops: 3,555 ha.
- Area of natural pasture: 3,618 ha.
- Area of woodland and forests: 3,471 ha.
- Persons dependent on farming: 1,000
- Farms with tractors: 19
- Number of tractors: 24
- Cattle herd: 49,000 head IBGE

== Health and education ==
In the educational sector there were 9 schools in activity in 2006, with 2,128 students. The literacy rate was 85.1%. In the health sector there was 1 hospital with 22 beds. The infant mortality rate was 19.60 (in 1,000 live births)

Itauçu had a score of 0.742 (2000) on the Municipal Human Development Index giving a state ranking of 103 (out of 242 municipalities in 2000) and a national ranking of 2,118 (out of 5,507 municipalities in 2000). For the complete list see frigoletto.com.br

== Football ==
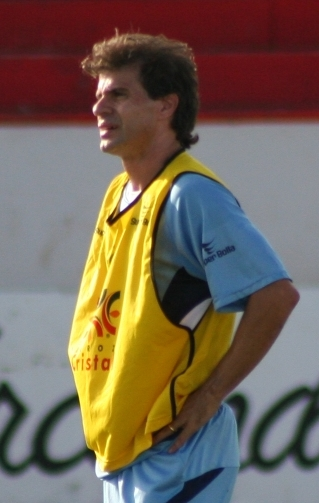
Túlio Maravilha

Founded on May 31, 1986, with the name of Associação Esportiva Itauçuense, in 2007 it was renamed Itauçu Esporte Clube is a football club that represents the city. In 2010, the weather changed from Ituaçu to Nerópolis and changed its name to Nerópolis Esporte Clube. But in 2014 he returned to his hometown, and played in the Campeonato Goiano (Third Division).

The team debuted professionally in 2006 at Campeonato Goiano (Third Division). The team, already in the debut season in professional football, reached the title by thrashing Tupy (de Jussara) in the final, 3x0. Altogether there were seven games with five wins, a draw and just one defeat. Highlight for Túlio Maravilha, top scorer of the competition with seven goals scored.

== See also ==
- List of municipalities in Goiás
