= Inhumas =

- Municipality
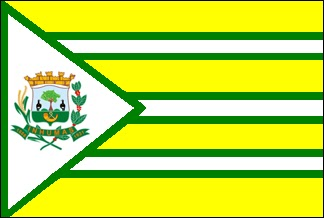
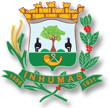
- Flag Coat of arms

- Location in Goiás state

- Location in Brazil
- Coordinates: 16°21′18″S 49°29′35″W
- Country: Brazil
- Region: Central-West
- State: Goiás
- Microregion: Anápolis Microregion

Area
  - Total: 613.3 km^{2} (236.8 sq mi)
- Elevation: 770 m (2,530 ft)

Population (2020)
  - Total: 53,259
  - Density: 86.84/km^{2} (224.9/sq mi)
- Time zone: UTC−3 (BRT)
- Postal code: 75400-000
- Website: www.inhumas.go.gov.br

Inhumas (Portuguese: [ĩˈɲũmɐs]) is a municipality in central Goiás state, Brazil. The population was 52 866 (2019 estimate) in a total area of 613.3 km^{2} (236.8 sq mi) (10/10/2002). Inhumas is a large producer of sugarcane, poultry, milk, and meat.

== Distances and Location ==
- Distance to the state capital: 54 km.
- Distance to regional center (Anápolis): 73 km.
- Highway connections: state highway GO-070 north from Goiânia, through Goianira and then 22 km. north.

Inhumas is on the Meia Ponte River. Neighboring municipalities are Itauçu, Petrolina, Damolândia, Brazabrantes, Caturaí, and Araçu.

== Demographics ==
- Population growth rate 1996/2006: 1.05%
- Population in 2007: 44,983
- Population in 1980: 31,430
- Urban population in 2007: 42,421
- Rural population in 2007: 2,562

== The economy ==
Main agricultural activities were cattle raising (72,800 head in 2005) and agriculture. Because of the fertility of the soil and abundance of water Inhumas has a large and varied agricultural production. The main crops are sugarcane (373,000 tons), coffee, rice, soybeans, citrus fruits and bananas.

- Number of industrial establishments: 132
- Number of retail establishments: 486
- Banking establishments: Banco do Brasil S.A., BRADESCO S.A., Banco Itaú S.A., CEF, HSBC Bank Brasil S.A., Banco Multiplo (August 2007)
- Dairies: Laticínios Guerreiro Ltda. (22/05/2006)
- Industrial parks: Distrito Agroindustrial de Inhumas - DAI (June/2006)
- Distilleries: Centroálcool S/A - CENASA. (July/2007)
- Meat-packing plants: Frigorífico Vale da Goiabeira Ltda., Hiperboi Indústria e Comércio Ltda. (22/05/2006)

=== Agricultural data 2006 ===
- Farms: 678
- Total area: 38,854 ha.
- Area of permanent crops: 1,377 ha.
- Area of perennial crops: 5,611 ha.
- Area of natural pasture: 25,142 ha.
- Area of woodland and forests: 5,688 ha.
- Persons dependent on farming: 2,100
- Farms with tractors: 56
- Number of tractors: 121
- Cattle herd: 72,800 head IBGE

== Education and health ==
The literacy rate was 87.8% and the infant mortality rate was 20.7 in 1,000 live births. There were 49 schools in the municipality and 5 small hospitals. There is a campus of the State University of Goiás (UEG) offering courses in zoo technology and nursing.

Municipal Human Development Index

- MHDI: 0.765
- State ranking: 46 (out of 242 municipalities)
- National ranking: 1,454 (out of 5,507 municipalities)

== History ==
Inhumas was important as a stopping point on the Estrada Real linking the south with Goiás Velho. The first settlement was called Goiabeiras, because of the extensive groves of guava trees. It had fertile soil and attracted many immigrants, especially Syrians and Lebanese (Asmar, Sahium, Raiza, Chalub, Mahmud, Gebrim, Charter, Sebba, Nacruht), Italians (Pessoni, Qualhato, Serravali, Balestra, Quintanilha, Jácomo) and Japanese (Watanabe, Momonuke). The Syrian-Lebanese were the first to open commercial establishments in the 1930s. The Italians cultivated coffee and the Japanese worked on small farms producing garden vegetables. At one time the region was a major producer of coffee.

In 1896 Goiabeiras was elevated to the status of district in the municipality of Itaberaí. In 1908 the name was changed to "Inhumas" in homage to a local bird also known as inhuma or anhuma (Anhima cornuta). In 1931 Inhumas was dismembered from Itaberaí to become a municipality. For the history see Tudoinhumas and Inhumas.go

== See also ==
- List of municipalities in Goiás
